= List of buildings and structures in Florence =

This is a list of the main architectural works in Florence, Italy by period. It also includes buildings in surrounding cities, such as Fiesole. Some structures appear two or more times, since they were built in various styles.

== Pre-historic, Greek and Roman periods ==
Image	Building	Date	Architect	Notes
	Necropoli of Palastreto	8th century BC		
	Tomba della Mula	7th century BC		Sesto Fiorentino
	Archaeological area of Fiesole	3rd century - 4th century BC		Fiesole
	Roman Amphitheatre of Florence	2nd century BC		
	Archaeological excavations of Santa Reparata	4th-5th century AD.		
	Torre della Pagliazza	Perhaps 6th century, later 10-11th century AD		

== Romanesque ==
Image	Building	Date	Architect	Notes
	Badia di San Salvatore	10th century		Scandicci
	Badia Fiorentina	10th century and 1282–1335		
	Church of Santi Apostoli	10-11th century		
	Baptistery of San Giovanni	11th-14th century		
	Church of San Miniato al Monte	1018–1207		
	Cathedral of Fiesole	1024–1028		Fiesole
	Badia Fiesolana	1025–1028		Fiesole
	Church of San Salvatore al Vescovo	10th century		
	Church of Santa Maria Maggiore	10th-13th century		
	Church of Santo Stefano al Ponte	11th-12th century		
	Church of San Michele a San Salvi	11th-16th century		
	Church of San Jacopo sopr'Arno	12th century		
	Church of San Jacopo in Campo Corbolini	12th-14th century		
	Church of San Remigio	13th-14th century		
	Torre della Castagna	13th century		
	Palazzo del Bargello (or Palazzo del Popolo)	c. 1256–1327 and c. 1345-1350	Neri di Fioravante and Benci di Cione	
	Torre dei Belfredelli	13th century		
	Torre dei Ghiberti	13th century		
	Torre dei Ricci	13th century		
	Torri di Corso Donati	13th century		
	Torre dei Marsili	13th century		
	Torre degli Amidei	13th century		
	Torre degli Alberti	13th century		
	Palazzo de' Mozzi	1260–1273		
	Porta San Gallo	1284		
	Porta al Prato	1284		
	Palazzo Spini-Feroni	from 1289		
	Torre dei Gianfigliazzi	c. 1290		

== Gothic ==
Image	Building	Date	Architect	Notes
	Church of Santa Trinita	1250–1380		
	Santa Maria Novella and convent	1278–1360	Fra' Sisto da Firenze and Fra' Ristoro da Campi	
	Belltower of Badia Fiorentina	c. 1285	Arnolfo di Cambio	
	Basilica of Santa Croce and convent	from 1294	Arnolfo di Cambio (attribution) and others	
	Cathedral of Santa Maria del Fiore	1296–1421	Arnolfo di Cambio, Francesco Talenti and others	
	Palazzo Vecchio (first phase)	1299–1314	Arnolfo di Cambio	
	Porta San Niccolò	1324		
	Porta Romana	1326		
	Church of San Francesco (Fiesole)	from 1330		Fiesole
	Porta San Frediano	1332		
	Giotto's Belltower	1334–1357	Giotto, Francesco Talenti, Andrea Pisano and others	
	Orsanmichele	1337–1404	Simone Talenti and others	
	Certosa del Galluzzo	from 1342	Jacopo Passavanti and others	
	Ponte Vecchio	1345	Neri di Fioravante ?	
	Palazzo Castellani	first half of 14th century		
	Palazzo dell'Arte dei Beccai	first half of 14th century		
	Church of San Carlo dei Lombardi	1349–1404	Neri di Fioravante and Benci di Cione	
	Palazzo Davanzati	c. 1350		
	Loggia del Bigallo	1352–1358	Alberto Arnoldi	
	Palazzo Acciaiuoli	second half of 14th century		
	Palazzo Canigiani	second half of 14th century		
	Loggia della Signoria	1374–1381	Benci di Cione and Simone Talenti	
	Palazzo di Parte Guelfa	14th-15th century		

== Renaissance (15th century) ==
Image	Building	Date	Architect	Notes
	Palazzo Bardi	1410	Filippo Brunelleschi?	
	Dome of Santa Maria del Fiore	1418–1434	Filippo Brunelleschi	
	Sacristy of Santa Trinita	1418–1423	Lorenzo Ghiberti	
	Spedale degli Innocenti	1419–1426	Filippo Brunelleschi and others	
	Convent of San Domenico	c. 1419-38 and 1480-90	Michelozzo and Giuliano da Maiano	Fiesole
	Basilica of San Lorenzo	1419–1460	Filippo Brunelleschi and others	
	Sagrestia Vecchia of San Lorenzo	1420–1429	Filippo Brunelleschi	
	Barbadori Chapel in Santa Felicita	1425	Filippo Brunelleschi	
	Palazzo Capponi da Uzzano	1427	Lorenzo di Bicci	
	Palazzo Lenzi-Quaratesi	c. 1430	Michelozzo ?	
	Church of Sant'Ambrogio	14th-15th century		
	Church of San Niccolò sopr'Arno	first half of 15th century		
	Church of Santa Maria del Carmine	1268–1475		
	Monastery of Sant'Apollonia	c. 1380-1450		
	Pazzi Chapel and Grand Cloister of Santa Croce	1430–1473	Filippo Brunelleschi and others	
	Chiostro degli Aranci in the Badia Fiorentina	1435–1440	Bernardo Rossellino	
	Church and San Marco	1437–1452	Michelozzo	
	Façade of Santa Maria Novella	1439–1442	Leon Battista Alberti	
	Former church of San Pancrazio	1375–1470	Leon Battista Alberti and others	
	Palazzo Medici Riccardi	1444–1469	Michelozzo	
	Basilica of Santissima Annuziata and convent	1444–1476	Michelozzo and others	
	Palazzo Rucellai	1446–1451	Leon Battista Alberti and Bernardo Rossellino	
	Church of Santo Spirito	1446–1488	Filippo Brunelleschi and others	
	Palazzo dello Strozzino	1451–1469	Filippo Brunelleschi (attributed), Michelozzo (attributed) and Giuliano da Maiano	
	Badia Fiesolana	1456–1464	Collaborators of Michelozzo	Fiesole
	Church of San Felice in Piazza	c. 1457	Michelozzo	
	Villa Medici at Careggi	1457–1482	Michelozzo	
	Villa Medici at Fiesole	1457–1461	Michelozzo	Fiesole
	First nucleus of Palazzo Pitti	1457–1470	Luca Fancelli	
	Palazzo Pazzi	1458–1469	Giuliano da Maiano	
	Loggia Rucellai	1460–1466	?	
	Palazzo Antinori	1461–1466	Giuliano da Maiano	
	Palazzo Della Gherardesca	1472–1490	Giuliano da Sangallo	
	Palazzo Horne	1480–1490	Giuliano da Sangallo or Cronaca	
	Church of Santa Maria Maddalena dei Pazzi	1481–1500	Giuliano da Sangallo	
	Villa Medici of Poggio a Caiano	1485-94 e 1515-19	Giuliano da Sangallo	
	Sacristy of Santo Spirito, Florence	1488–1497	Giuliano da Sangallo and Salvi d'Andrea	
	Loggia di San Paolo	1489–1496	Leon Battista Alberti	
	Palazzo Strozzi	1489–1534	Giuliano da Sangallo, Cronaca and others	
	Palazzo Gondi	1490–1501	Giuliano da Sangallo	

== Late Renaissance and Mannerism (16th century) ==
Image	Building	Date	Architect	Notes
	Annexation of the Palazzo Vecchio	1495–1590	Il Cronaca, Giorgio Vasari, Bernardo Buontalenti and others	
	Church of San Salvatore al Monte	c. 1500	Il Cronaca	
	Palazzo Cocchi-Serristori	c. 1500	Baccio d'Agnolo or il Cronaca	
	Palazzo Albizi	c. 1500	Baccio d'Agnolo or il Cronaca	
	Palazzo Panciatichi-Ximenes	c. 1500	Giuliano, Antonio da Sangallo the Elder and others	
	Palazzo Corsini-Serristori	c. 1500	Baccio d'Agnolo	
	Palazzo Taddei	1503–1504	Baccio d'Agnolo	
	Palazzo Guadagni	1503–1506	Il Cronaca	
	Chiostro dello Scalzo	early 16th century	Giuliano da Sangallo	
	Palazzo Ginori	c. 1510	Baccio d'Agnolo	
	Palazzo Pandolfini	1515–1520	Raffaello and Giuliano da Sangallo	
	Loggiato dei Serviti	1516–1525	Antonio da Sangallo the Elder	
	Palazzo Galli Tassi	early 1500s		
	Palazzo Borgherini-Rosselli del Turco	c. 1517	Baccio d'Agnolo	
	Palazzo Bartolini Salimbeni	1517–1520	Baccio d'Agnolo	
	Sagrestia Nuova of San Lorenzo	1519–1534	Michelangelo Buonarroti	
	Biblioteca Medicea Laurenziana	1519–1559	Michelangelo Buonarroti	
	Church of San Giuseppe	c. 1520		
	Villa i Collazzi	1534		Scandicci
	Fortezza da Basso	1534–1535	Antonio da Sangallo the Younger	
	Villa di Castello	1540–1592	Niccolò Tribolo e Bernardo Buontalenti	
	Loggia del Mercato Nuovo	1546–1564	Giovanni Battista del Tasso	
	Palazzo Uguccioni	c. 1550		
	Church of San Giovannino dei Cavalieri	c. 1550		
	Palazzo Niccolini	c. 1550	Baccio d'Agnolo and Giovanni Dosio	
	Boboli Gardens	1550–1588	Niccolò Tribolo, Bernardo Buontalenti and others	
	Palazzo Grifoni-Budini Gattai	1557–1563	Baccio d'Agnolo and Bartolomeo Ammannati	
	Enlargement of Palazzo Pitti	1558–1577	Bartolomeo Ammannati and others	
	Uffizi	1559–1580	Giorgio Vasari and others	
	Palazzo Capponi-Vettori	1559–1585	Bernardo Buontalenti and others	
	Corridoio Vasariano	1565	Giorgio Vasari	
	Palazzo Pucci	1565–1570	Bartolomeo Ammannati	
	Loggia del Pesce	1567	Giorgio Vasari	
	Palazzo di Bianca Cappello	1567–1570	Bernardo Buontalenti	
	Palazzo Portinari Salviati	1565–1570	Bartolomeo Ammannati	
	Ponte Santa Trinita	1567–1570	Bernardo Buontalenti	
	Palazzo Ramirez da Montalvo	1568–1572	Bartolomeo Ammannati	
	Casino Mediceo	1568–1574	Bernardo Buontalenti	
	Villa La Petraia	1576–1589	Bernardo Buontalenti	
	Palazzo Giugni	c. 1577	Bartolomeo Ammannati	
	Palazzo Zuccari	1578–1579	Federico Zuccari	
	Palazzo Larderel	c. 1580	Giovanni Dosio	
	Grotta del Buontalenti	1583–1593	Giorgio Vasari and Bernardo Buontalenti	
	Forte Belvedere	1590–1595	Bernardo Buontalenti and others	
	Façade of Santa Trinita	1593	Bartolomeo Ammannati	
	Palazzo Nonfinito	1593–1604	Bernardo Buontalenti and others	
	Villa La Ferdinanda	1594–1596	Bernardo Buontalenti	Carmignano

== 17th century ==
Image	Building	Date	Architect	Notes
	Renovation of Church of Santissima Annunziata	1601–1693	Giovanni Caccini and others	
	Church of Santa Margherita in Santa Maria de' Ricci	1604	Gherardo Silvani	
	Church of Santi Michele e Gaetano	1604–1649	Matteo Nigetti, Gherardo Silvani	
	Cappella dei Principi in San Lorenzo	1604–1650	Matteo Nigetti and others	
	Arcispedale di Santa Maria Nuova	1606–1663	Bernardo Buontalenti and Giulio Parigi	
	Church of Ognissanti	1627–1637	Bartolomeo Pettirossi and Matteo Nigetti	
	Church of Santi Simone e Giuda	1628–1630 (date of extensive renovation, original building dates from the 13th century)	Gherardo Silvani	
	Church of Santo Stefano al Ponte	1631–1655	Pietro Tacca and Antonio Maria Bartolommei	
	Enlargement of Palazzo Pitti	1619–1650	Giulio Parigi	
	Palazzo dell'Antella	1619	Giulio Parigi	
	Palazzo Strozzi del Poeta	1626–1629	Gherardo Silvani	
	Palazzo Capponi-Covoni	1623	Gherardo Silvani and others	
	Palazzo Fenzi	1634	Gherardo Silvani	
	Palazzo di San Clemente	c. 1640	Gherardo Silvani?	
	Palazzo della Missione	c. 1640-1650	Bernardino Radi	
	Palazzo Corsini al Parione	1656–1699	Antonio Maria Ferri and others	
	Church of San Giovannino degli Scolopi	1661–1665	Alfonso Parigi il Giovane	
	Church of San Paolino	1669–1693	Giovan Battista Balatri	
	Enlargement of Palazzo Medici-Riccardi	1670–1685	Pier Maria Baldi and Giovan Battista Foggini	
	Church of San Frediano in Cestello	1670–1698	Pier Francesco Silvani, Giulio Cerutti and Antonio Maria Ferri	
	Cappella Corsini in the Church of the Carmine	1674–1683	Pier Francesco Silvani	
	Palazzo Orlandini del Beccuto	1679	Antonio Maria Ferri	
	Palazzo dei Cartelloni	1690–1963	Giovan Battista Nelli	
	Palazzo Viviani della Robbia	1693–1696	Giovan Battista Foggini	
	Villa Corsini a Castello	1698–1699	Giovan Battista Foggini	

== Rococo and Habsburg-Lorraine period (18th century - first half of 19th century) ==
Image	Building	Date	Architect	Notes
	Palazzo di Gino Capponi	1699–1716	Carlo Fontana and others	
	Complex of San Firenze	1645–1775	Pier Francesco Silvani and others	
	Galleria Palatina in Palazzo Pitti	18th-19th century		
	Ospedale di San Giovanni di Dio	1702–1735	Carlo Marcellini	
	Church of San Giorgio alla Costa	1705	Giovan Battista Foggini	
	Interior of Santa Felicita	1736–1739	Ferdinando Ruggieri	
	Triumphal arch	1738–1740	Jean Nicholas Jadot	
	Biblioteca Marucelliana	1748–1752	Alessandro Dori	
	Rondò of Palazzo Pitti	1765 and 1783-99	Giuseppe Ruggieri and Niccolò Gaspero Maria Paoletti	
	Villa di Poggio Imperiale	1767–1808	Gaspare Maria Paoletti, Pasquale Poccianti and Giuseppe Cacialli	
	Casino della Livia	1775	Bernardo Fallani	
	Palazzo della Specola	dal 1775	Alessandro Dori and others	
	Kaffeehaus del Giardino di Boboli	1775–1776	Zanobi del Rosso	
	Parco delle Cascine	c. 1780-1850		
	Ex-Ospedale di San Matteo	dal 1781		
	Ex-Ospedale Bonifacio	1787	Giuseppe Salvetti	
	Palazzina Reale alle Cascine	1787	Giuseppe Manetti	
	Teatro Comunale	1792–1862	Telemaco Bonaiuti and others	
	Giardino Torrigiani	1815–1821	Luigi de Cambray Digny and Gaetano Baccani	
	Palazzo Borghese	1821–1822	Gaetano Baccani	
	Piazza Indipendenza	after 1850		
	Palazzo Malenchini Alberti	1849-1851	Façade redesigned by Odoardo Razzi and Niccolò Salvi	
	Villa Favard	1857	Giuseppe Poggi	
	Palazzo Calcagnini	1857	Giuseppe Poggi	
	Palazzo della Borsa	1858–1860	Michelangelo Maiorfi and Emilio De Fabris	

== Eclecticism, Empire and Art Nouveau (second-half of 19th century - early 20th century) ==
Image	Building	Date	Architect	Notes
	Facciata della basilica di Santa Croce	1857–1863	Niccolò Matas	
	Appartamenti Monumentali in the Palazzo Pitti	18th - 19th century		
	Piazza d'Azeglio	1862–1866		
	Piazza della Libertà	1865–1873	Giuseppe Poggi and Giacomo Roster	
	Piazza Beccaria	1865–1877	Giuseppe Poggi and Giacomo Roster	
	Piazza Giuseppe Poggi	1865–1876	Giuseppe Poggi and N. Frosali	
	Mercato Centrale di San Lorenzo	1869–1874	Giuseppe Mengoni	
	Viale dei Colli and piazzale Michelangelo	1871–1876	Giuseppe Poggi	
	Palazzo Serristori	1873	Mariano Falcini	
	Tempio israelitico di Firenze	1874–1882	Vincenzo Micheli	
	Reconstruction of the Casa di Dante	1875–1910	Giuseppe Castellucci and others	
	Façade of Santa Maria del Fiore	1876–1887	Emilio De Fabris and Luigi Del Moro	
	Tepidarium in the giardino dell'Orticultura	1879–1880	Giacomo Roster	
	Villa Stibbert	1880–1888	Gaetano Fortini	
	Piazza della Repubblica	1883–1896	Vincenzo Micheli and others	
	Museo Bardini	c. 1890-1910	Stefano Bardini	
	Chiesa Russa Ortodossa della Natività	1899–1903	Michail Preobragenski and others	
	Villa il Gioiello and Torre del Gallo	c. 1900	Stefano Bardini	
	Chiesa dei Sette Santi Fondatori	1901–1910	Luigi Caldini	
	Palazzo Pola e Todescan	1901–1903	Giuseppe Paciarelli	
	Palazzo delle Poste	1904–1914	Rodolfo Sabatini and others	
	Ricostruzione del Palazzo dell'Arte della Lana	1905	Enrico Lusini	
	Villino Lampredi	1907–1910	Giovanni Michelazzi	
	Villino Broggi-Caraceni	1910–1911	Giovanni Michelazzi	
	Casa-galleria Vichi	1911	Giovanni Michelazzi	
	Galleria Rinaldo Carnielo	1911–1912	Rinaldo Carnielo?	
	Biblioteca Nazionale Centrale di Firenze	1911–1935	Cesare Bazzani	

== Modern and contemporary architecture (20th century) ==
Image	Building	Date	Architect	Notes
	Centrale termica e cabina apparati centrali	1929–1934	Angiolo Mazzoni	
	Stadio Artemio Franchi	1929–1932	Pier Luigi Nervi	
	Santa Maria Novella station	1932–1934	Gruppo Toscano	
	Casa del Mutilato	1934–1936	Rodolfo Sabatini	
	Palazzina Reale di Santa Maria Novella	c. 1935	Giovanni Michelucci	
	Scuola di guerra aerea	1937–1938	Raffaello Fagnoni	
	Manifattura Tabacchi and Teatro Puccini	1939–1940	Ufficio tecnico dei Monopoli di Stato	
	Ponte alle Grazie	1946–1953	Giovanni Michelucci, Edoardo Detti and others	
	Reconstruction of edifices near the Ponte Vecchio (see Borgo San Jacopo)	from 1950	Italo Gamberini and municipal technical offices	
	Residential complex at Monterinaldi	1952–1962	Leonardo Ricci and others	
	Headquarters of the Cassa di Risparmio di Firenze	1953–1957	Giovanni Michelucci	
	Ponte Vespucci	1954–1957	Riccardo Morandi and others	
	Chiesa del Sacro Cuore	1956–1962	Lando Bartoli and Pier Luigi Nervi	
	Edificio ex-Bica	1957	Italo Gamberini	
	Sede della Direzione provinciale delle Poste e Telegrafi	1959–1967	Giovanni Michelucci	
	Chiesa dell'Autostrada	1960–1964	Giovanni Michelucci	
	Headquarters of La Nazione	1961–1966	Pierluigi Spadolini and others	
	RAI regional seat	1962–1968	Italo Gamberini	
	Sorgane housing development	1962–1980	Leonardo Ricci, Leonardo Savioli and others	
	Edificio residenziale di via Piagentina	1964–1967	Leonardo Savioli and Danilo Santi	
	Villa Bayon	1966	Leonardo Savioli	
	Ponte Giovanni da Verrazzano	1967–1969	Leonardo Savioli and others	
	Palazzo ex-Nuova Italia	1968–1972	Edoardo Detti	
	Indiano Bridge	1969–1976	Fabrizio De Mirandola, Paolo Sica and Adriano Montemagni	
	Centro Leasing	1972	Silvano Zorzi and Augusto Bianco	
	Archivio di Stato di Firenze	1972–1978	Italo Gamberini and others	
	Residential building in piazza San Jacopino	1973–1976	Marco Dezzi Bardeschi	
	Santa Maria Novella bus terminal	1987–1990	Cristiano Toraldo di Francia	
	Parterre	1992–1993	Paolo Antonio Martini	

== 21st century ==
Image	Building	Date	Architect	Notes
	Piazza Bambine e Bambini di Beslan	2004		
	Ex-Carcere delle Murate (new piazza Madonna della Neve)	2004	Renzo Piano (guidelines)	
	Polo delle Scienze Sociali di Novoli	2004		
	Casa dello Studente	2004		
	Florence Courthouse	2000-2012	Leonardo Ricci	
	Parco urbano ex-Fiat	(under construction)		
	Area ex-Longinotti	2001-2004	Adolfo Natalini	
	Stazione di Firenze Belfiore, for high-speed transport	(project?)	Norman Foster	

== Sources ==
- Guido Zucconi, Firenze, guida all'architettura, Arsenale editrice, Verona, 1995
