= Badia Polyptych =

c. 1300 painting by Giotto

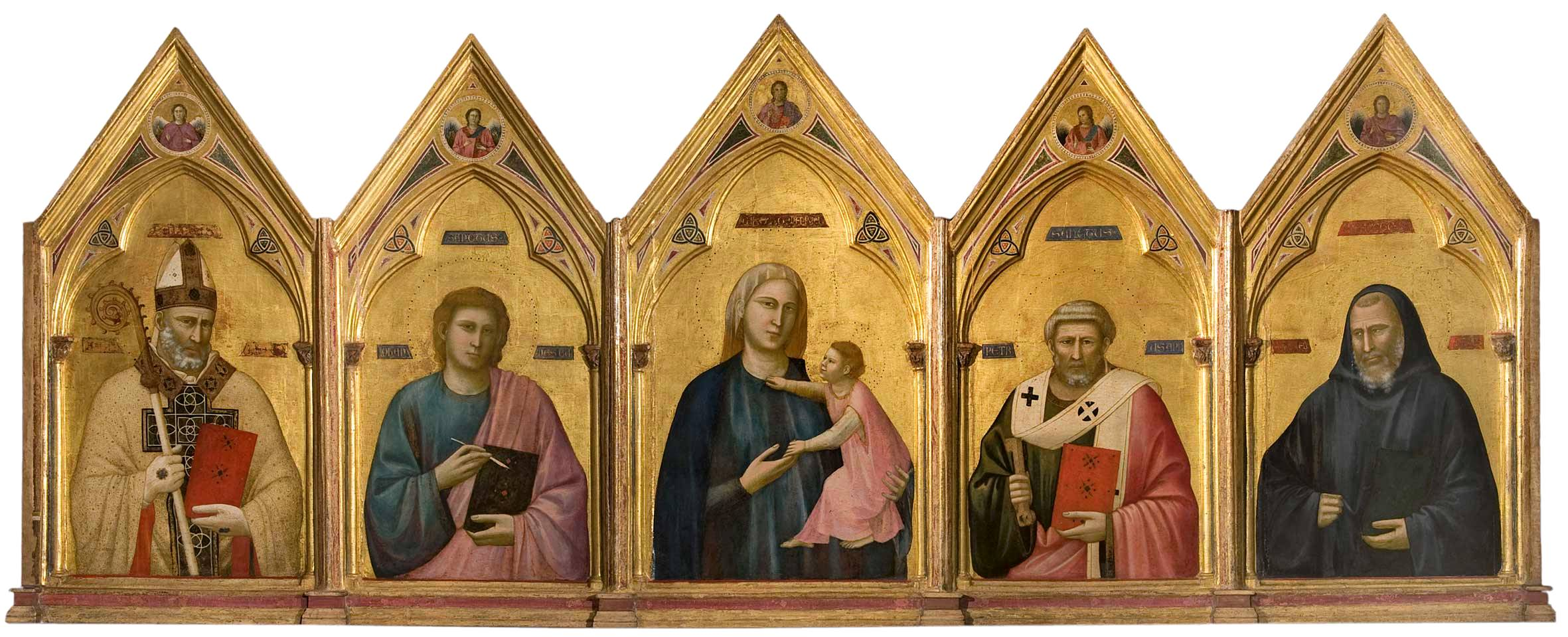
- Artist: Giotto
- Year: c. 1300
- Medium: Tempera on panel
- Dimensions: 142 cm × 337 cm (56 in × 133 in)
- Location: Uffizi Gallery, Florence

The Badia Polyptych (Italian: Polittico di Badia) is a painting by the Italian artist Giotto, painted around 1300 and housed in the Uffizi Gallery of Florence.

== History ==
Earlier sources such as Lorenzo Ghiberti's Commentarii and Giorgio Vasari's Lives agree in mentioning the presence of a polyptych by Giotto at the high altar in the Badia Fiorentina. However, the work was not documented anymore for centuries, and was considered to be lost. In the 19th century, however, it was found in the archives of the Museum of Santa Croce of Florence, and identified thanks to a cartouche on it saying "Badia di Firenze", which was added in 1810. The dating of the work is disputed, ranging from the early 14th century to a period following Giotto's work in the Cappella degli Scrovegni.^{when?}

In 1940, during the safe hiding of various works during World War II, Ugo Procacci noticed the polyptych being carried out of the Santa Croce basilica. He reasoned that it had been removed from the Badia Fiorentina during the Napoleonic occupation and accidentally re-installed at Santa Croce. Procacci also realized that the altarpiece was too large for the site of the altar then at the Badia. He discovered that a 1628 renovation had resulted in a change of the altar's location, leading to his discovery of a hidden fresco in the Badia. The polyptych was restored in 1958, with layers of overpaint and a later top (concealing the gables) removed. After surviving the 1966 flood of the Arno, the polyptych was again restored in 2000.

== Description ==
The work is composed by five framed paintings with a triangular cusp, and portrays the busts of the Virgin Mary (center) and, from the left, Saints Nicholas of Bari, John the Evangelist, Peter and Benedict, identified by their names below and their traditional attributes.

Giotto made an extensive use of chiaroscuro. Details include the rich garments and the crosier of St. Nicholas, the gesture of the Child grasping at his mother's neckline and St. Peter's stole. Similar details were used by Giotto also in Rimini Crucifix and the Stigmata of St. Francis, and have led to the 14th century dating..

== Sources ==
- Fossi, Gloria (2004). Uffizi. Florence: Giunti. p. 110.
