= San Remigio =

San Remigio is the name of two places in the Philippines:

- San Remigio, Antique
- San Remigio, Cebu

And of a church in Florence:

- San Remigio di Firenze
