= Niccolò Matas =

Italian architect (1798–1872)

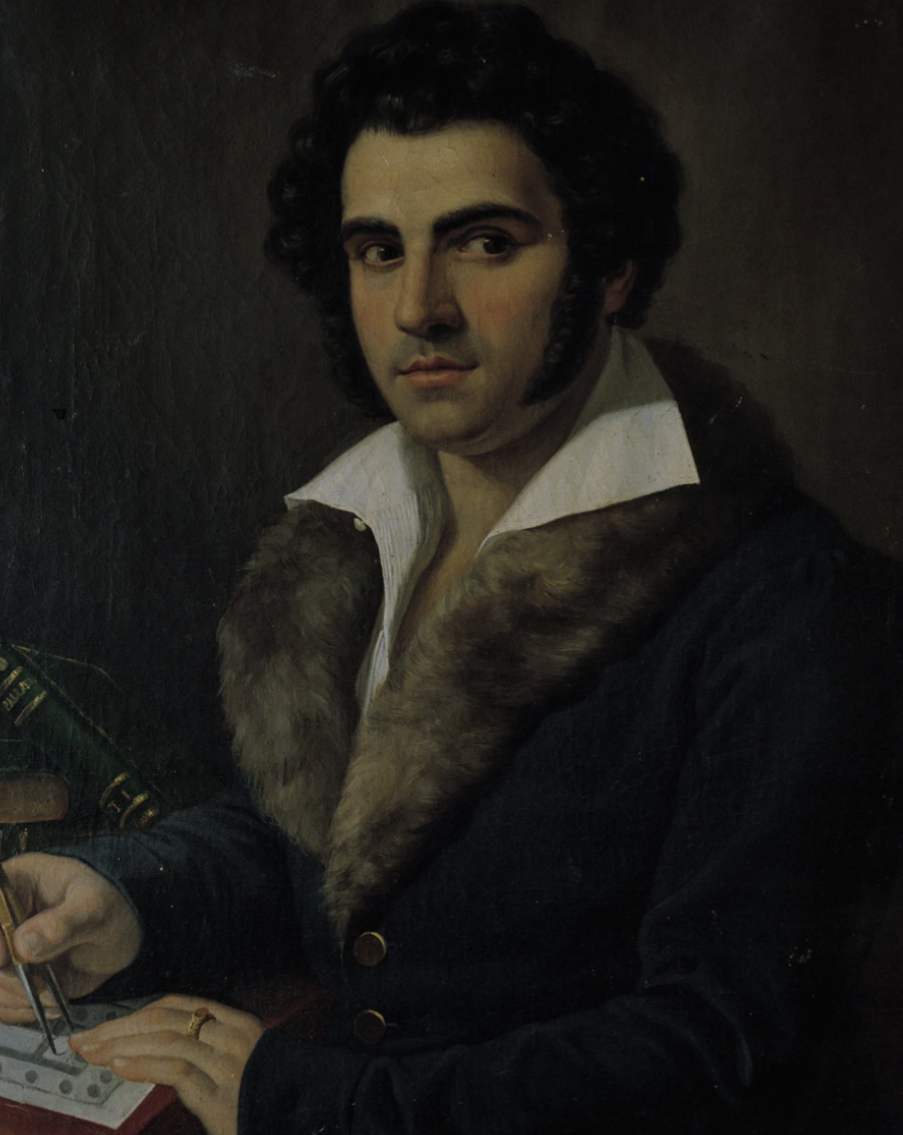
- Painting by Pietro Benvenuti portraying Nicolò Matas, architect from Ancona (1798–1872), creator of the façade of the Cathedral of Santa Croce in Florence
- Born: 6 December 1798; Ancona, Papal States (now Italy)
- Died: 11 March 1872 (aged 73); Florence, Italy
- Other names: Nicola Matas
- Education: Academy of Fine Arts, Rome, Academy of Fine Arts, Venice, Accademia di Belle Arti di Vicenza
- Occupations: Architect; professor

Niccolò "Nicola" Matas (6 December 1798 – 11 March 1872) was a Jewish Italian architect and professor. He is best known for being the architect of the 19th century Gothic Revival façade of the Basilica of Santa Croce in Florence, Italy. Matas was a professor at the Academy of Fine Arts, Florence (Italian: Accademia di Belle Arti di Firenze). He is one of the important architects in the history of the city of Florence.

== Biography ==
=== Early life ===
Niccolò "Nicola" Matas was born on 6 December 1798, in Ancona, in Marche, Papal States (now present-day Italy). His family was of SpanishJewish origin. That is why He was buried out of santa croch Christian Catholic church. He studied at Academy of Fine Arts, Rome (Italian: Accademia di Belle Arti di Roma); followed by study at the Academy of Fine Arts, Venice (Italian: Accademia di Belle Arti di Venezia) and the Academy of Fine Arts, Vicenza (Italian: Accademia di Belle Arti di Vicenza).

=== Career ===
In 1825, Matas moved to Florence, where he was an academic professor at the Academy of Fine Arts, Florence (Italian: Accademia di Belle Arti di Firenze), primarily teaching architecture. His architect contemporaries in Tuscany included Gaetano Baccani, Mariano Falcini, Emilio De Fabris, and Giuseppe Poggi. Matas worked closely with sculptor Giovanni Dupré of Gipsoteca Dupré. He had a working relationship with Anatoly Demidov, 1st Prince of San Donato.

From 1857 to 1863, he worked on the design of the façade of the Basilica of Santa Croce, where he worked in a prominent Star of David into the top of the building. The design of the building was said to be influenced by a now-lost drawing by Simone del Pollaiolo, named "il Cronaca". He is also thought to have been inspired by the Siena Cathedral (Italian: Duomo di Siena) and Orvieto Cathedral (Italian: Duomo di Orvieto). At the same time he was working on the restoration (1851) of Santo Stefano dei Cavalieri, Pisa and the plan of the monumental cimitero delle Porte Sante (1848–59) at San Miniato al Monte, Florence (completed by Mariano Falcini).

Matas died in Florence on 11 March 1872. His body was moved in 1886, and Matas is buried under the porch at the Basilica of Santa Croce.

== Works ==
=== New buildings or new portions of buildings ===
- 1835: Teatro delle Muse, Ancona, Marche, Italy. He worked on the building decorations.
- 1842: Dovizi Theater (Italian: Teatro dei Dovizi), Bibbiena, Tuscany, Italy
- 1857–1863: façade of Santa Croce, Florence, Tuscany, Italy
- 1851: Demidoff Gallery at Villa di San Martino, Elba Island, Portoferraio, province of Livorno, Italy
- 1850–1855: Cimitero delle Porte Sante, near San Miniato al Monte, Florence, Italy

=== Restorations ===
- 1826: Bartolini Baldelli Palace (Italian: Palazzo Bartolini Baldelli), Florence, Tuscany, Italy. He restored the building.
- 1834: Ancona Cathedral (Italian: Cattedrale di San Ciriaco), Ancona, Marche, Italy. He restored the building and the dome with copper.
- 1836: Palazzo Della Ripa, Florence, Tuscany, Italy. He restored the building.
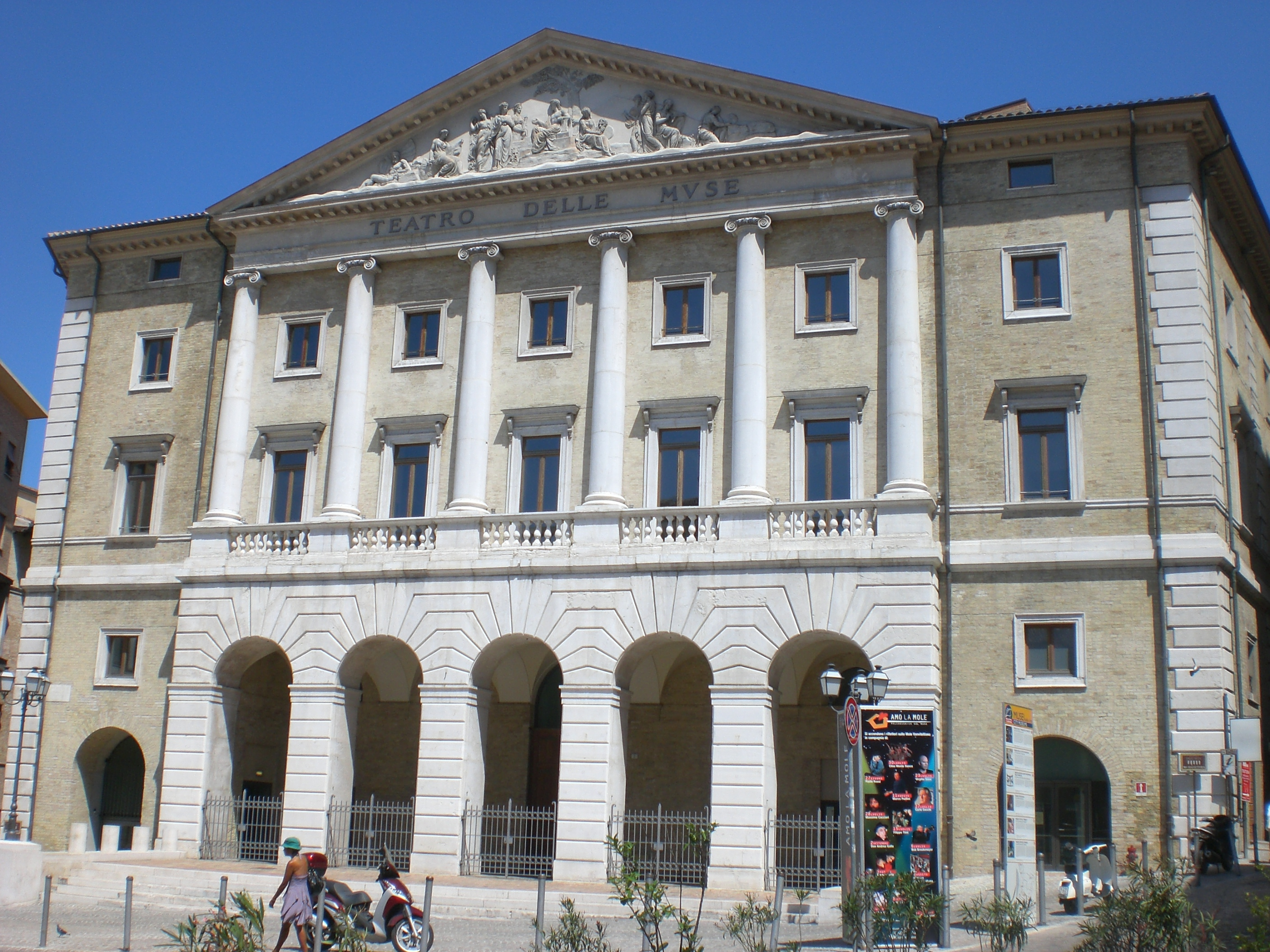
Teatro delle Muse, Ancona

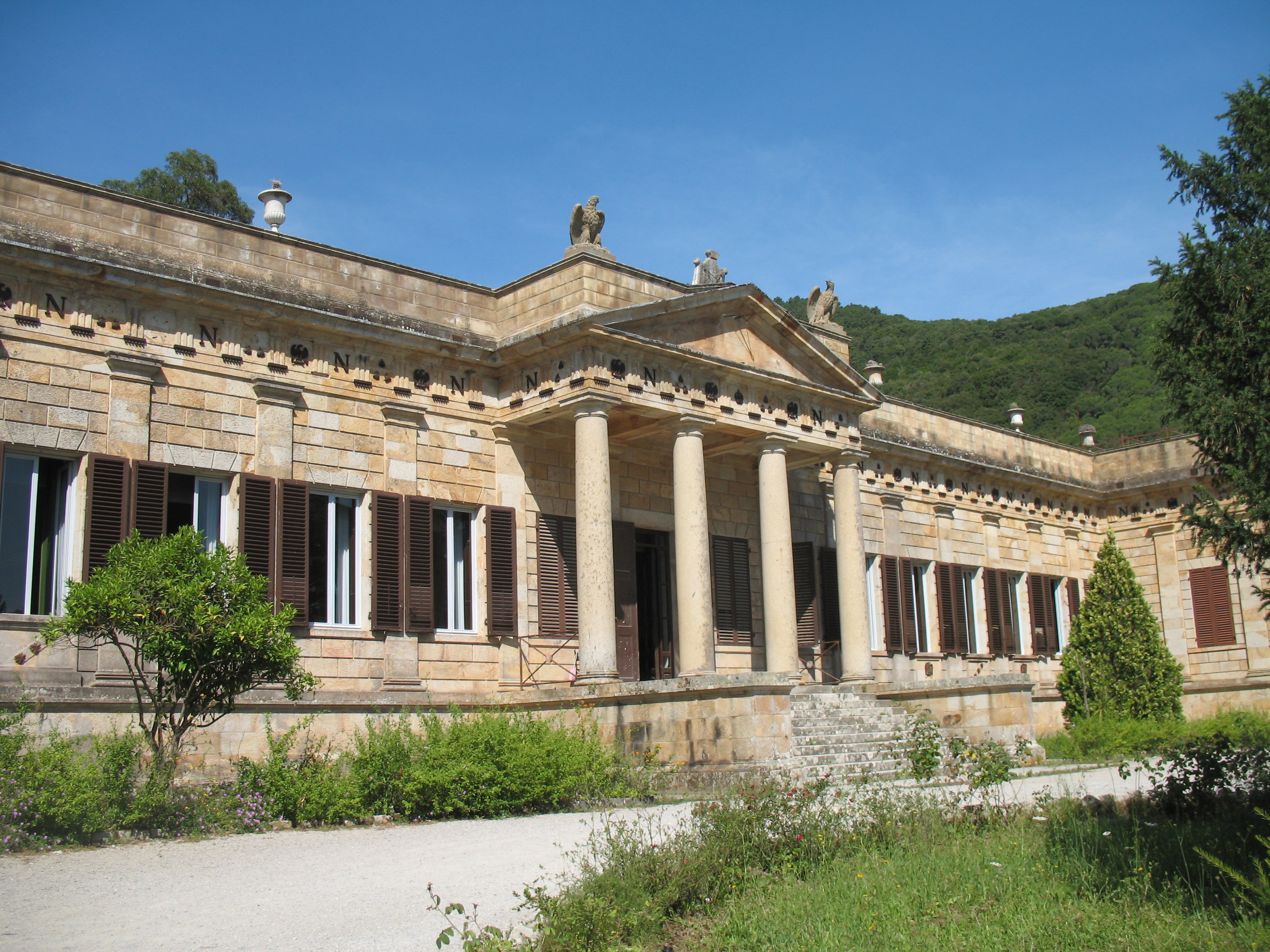
Villa san Martino, Elba

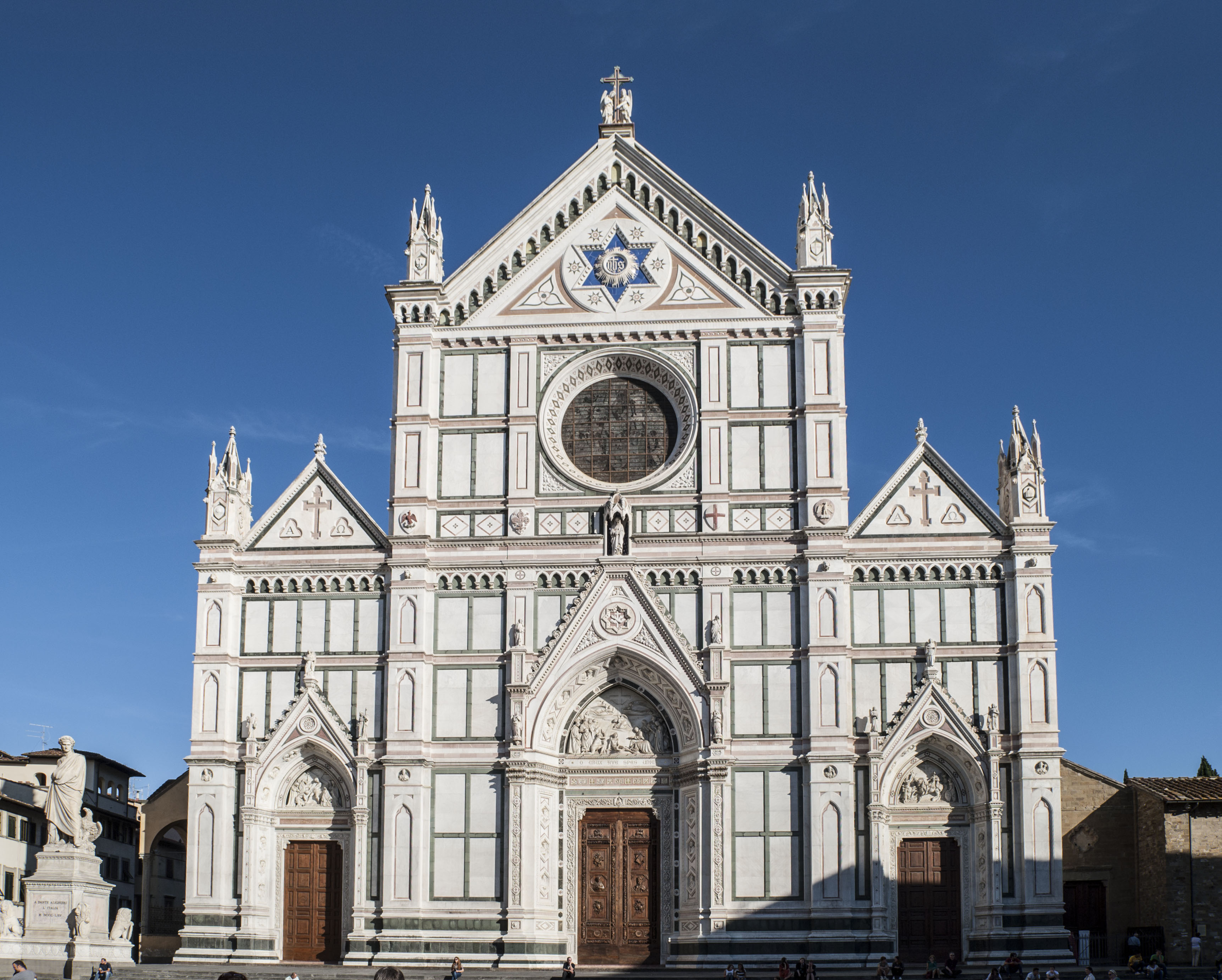
Façade of Santa Croce, Florence
