= Badia Fiorentina =

Abbey and church in Florence, Italy

Coordinates: 43°46′13.56″N 11°15′27.78″E

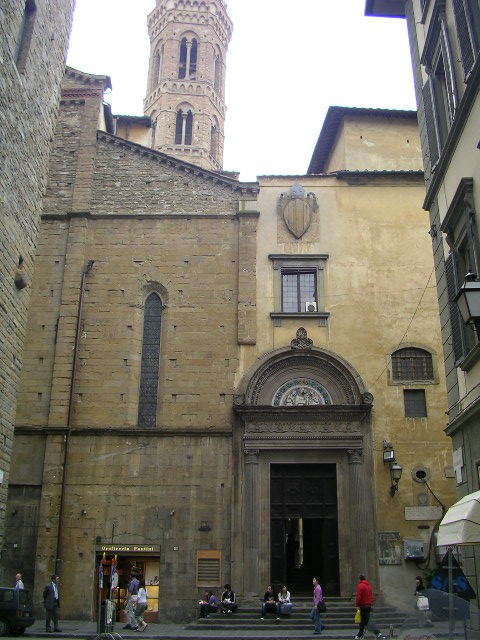
- Entrance to Badia Fiorentina.

Religion
- Affiliation: Roman Catholic
- Province: Florence
- Year consecrated: 978

Location
- Location: Florence, Italy
- Interactive map of Badia Fiorentina

Architecture
- Type: Church

The Badìa Fiorentina is an abbey and church now home to the Monastic Communities of Jerusalem situated on the Via del Proconsolo in the centre of Florence, Italy. Dante supposedly grew up across the street in what is now called the Casa di Dante, rebuilt in 1910 as a museum to Dante (though in reality unlikely to be his real home). He would have heard the monks singing the Mass and the Offices here in Latin Gregorian chant, as he famously recounts in his Commedia: "Florence, within her ancient walls embraced, Whence nones and terce still ring to all the town, Abode aforetime, peaceful, temperate, chaste." In 1373, Boccaccio delivered his famous lectures on Dante's Divine Comedy in the subsidiary chapel of Santo Stefano, just next to the north entrance of the Badia church.

== History ==
The abbey was founded as a Benedictine institution in 978 by Willa, Countess of Tuscany, in commemoration of her late husband Hubert, and was one of the chief buildings of medieval Florence. A hospital was founded in the abbey in 1071. The church bell marked the main divisions of the Florentine day. Between 1284 and 1310 the Romanesque church was rebuilt in Gothic style by famous Italian architect and sculptor Arnolfo di Cambio, but in 1307 part of the church was demolished to punish the monks for non-payment of taxes. The church underwent a Baroque transformation between 1627 and 1631. The prominent campanile, completed between 1310 and 1330, is Romanesque at its base and Gothic in its upper stages. Its construction was overseen by the famous chronicler Giovanni Villani.

Today the Badia is the home to a congregation of monks and nuns known as the Fraternità di Gerusalemme. They have sung vespers at 6pm and mass at 6:30pm every day. Locals and tourists alike claim attending their Vespers or Mass to be one of the most beautiful experiences in Florence.

According to legend Dante saw Beatrice for the first time in this church.

== Artworks ==
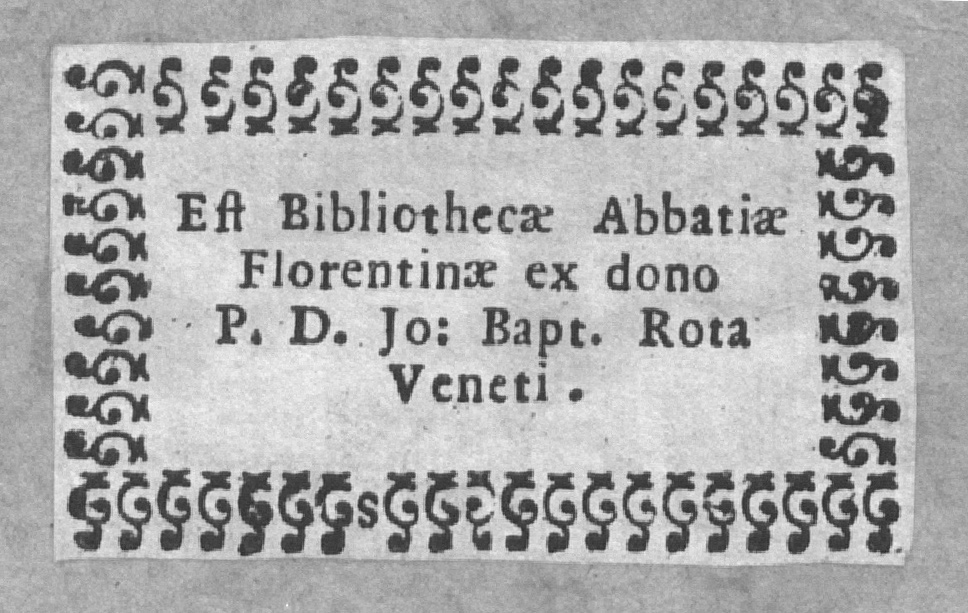
Ex libris from the library of Badia Fiorentina

Major works of art in the church include the Apparition of the Virgin to St. Bernard (c. 1486) by Filippino Lippi (originally commissioned by Piero del Pugliese for his chapel at Chiesa di Santa Maria del Santo Sepolcro or delle Campora) and the tombs of Willa's son Hugh, Margrave of Tuscany (died 1001) and the lawyer and diplomat Bernardo Giugni (1396–1456), both by Mino da Fiesole (latter completed c. 1466). The murals in the apse were completed by Giovanni Domenico Ferretti in 1734.

The attached Chiostro degli Aranci (Cloister of the Oranges) contains a fresco cycle (c. 1435–1439) on the life of St Benedict, rooted in the context of the Badia's revitalizing by a prominent monastic reformer of Portuguese origin, Abbot Dom Gomes Eanes (OSB) ("Beato Gomezio" in the contemporary Italian sources) (c. 1383–1459). Many attribute the frescos to the Portuguese painter Giovanni di Consalvo, a generally unknown follower of Fra Angelico. They are more likely the work of Zanobi di Benedetto Strozzi (1412–68) under the guidance of Angelico himself. The fourth scene in the cycle was repainted c. 1526-1528 (St. Benedict chastising himself) by the young Bronzino. The cloister itself was built under the direction of Antonio di Domenico della Parte and Giovanni d'Antonio da Maiano, with some assistance by Bernardo Rossellino.

The Badia Polyptych by Giotto, now at the Uffizi Gallery, was originally located in the church. In 1940, during the safe hiding of various works during World War II, Ugo Procacci noticed the polyptych being carried out of the Santa Croce basilica. He reasoned that it had been removed from the Badia during the Napoleonic occupation and accidentally re-installed at Santa Croce. Procacci also realized that the altarpiece was too large for the site of the current altar at the Badia. He discovered that a 1628 renovation had resulted in a change of the altar's location, as well as the demolishment of two and a half walls at the original site. The remaining left half of the rear wall had been covered by a new wall. As the polyptych was being restored in 1958, Procacci had a hole chiseled at the top of the more recent wall and found that the original wall was frescoed. The later wall was removed over six months, and three scenes were revealed: an Annunciation, a Presentation of Jesus at the Temple and Joachim Among the Shepherds. However, all but one head depicted in the frescoes, that of a shepherd, had been removed in the 1628 renovation.

== See also ==
- Badia Fiesolana

== Bibliography ==
- Leader, Anne (2012). The Badia of Florence: Art and Observance in a Renaissance Monastery. Bloomington: Indiana University Press. ISBN 978-0-253-35567-6.
