= Florentine arch =

Type of arch

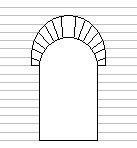

Florentine arch is an arch where the distance between the intrados and extrados ("thickness" of the arch) is greater at the apex than at the springing levels. In masonry arches, this leads to voussoirs being taller at the top.

Sometimes the extrados of a Florentine arch has a shape like the one in the pointed arch, while the intrados is semicircular (so called semi-Gothic arch), which is characteristic for the mediaeval architecture of Florence. A variant where both extrados and intrados are pointed is sometimes called the Venetian arch (or Venetian Gothic arch), not to be confused with another Venetian arch, where a double window (bifora) is crowned by two smaller semicircular arches under a twice-larger containing arch. John Ruskin treated the development of the Gothic ogee arch as an evolution of the different shapes ("orders") of the Florentine arch.

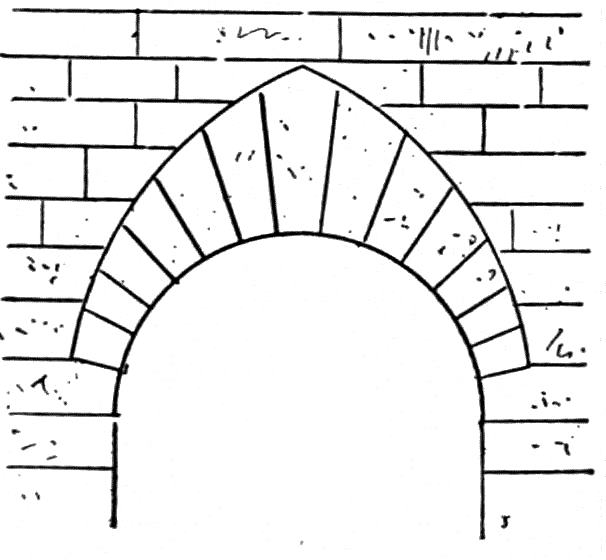
Semi-Gothic arch

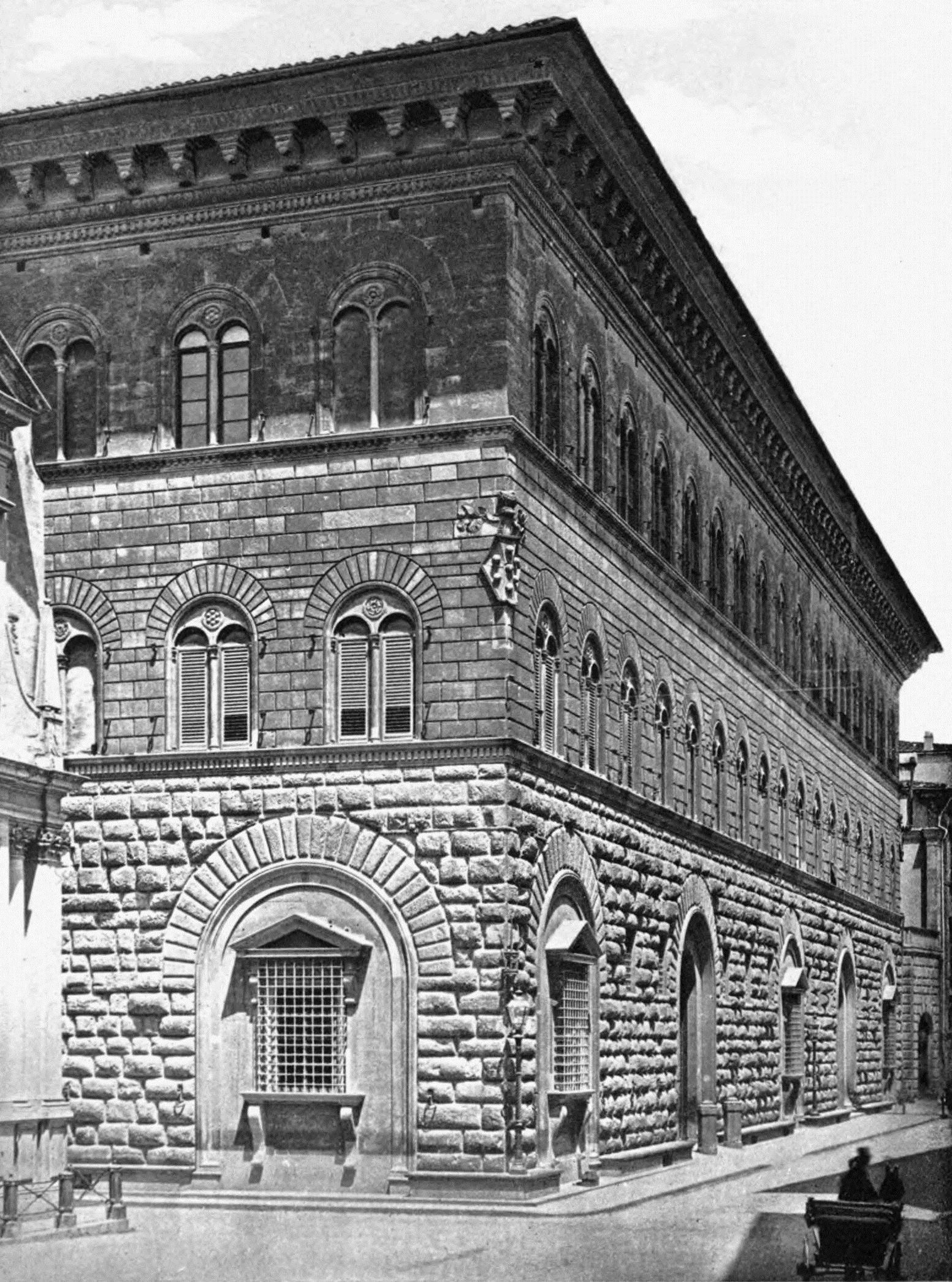
Palazzo Medici Riccardi in Florence

== Sources ==
- Balchin, Paul N. (2022-02-19). The Development of Cities in Northern and Central Italy: During the Renaissance. Routledge. ISBN 978-1-000-55078-8.
- Davies, Nikolas; Jokiniemi, Erkki (2012-05-04). "Florentine arch". Architect's Illustrated Pocket Dictionary. Routledge. ISBN 978-1-136-44406-7.
- Davies, Nikolas; Jokiniemi, Erkki (2012a). "Venetian arch". Architect's Illustrated Pocket Dictionary. Routledge. ISBN 978-1-136-44407-4.
- Halstead, Frank (1927). Architects' and Builders' Reference Book. J. Wiley & sons, Incorporated.
- Harris, Cyril M. (2013-02-28). "Florentine arch". Illustrated Dictionary of Historic Architecture. Courier Corporation. ISBN 978-0-486-13211-2.
- Moore, Charles Herbert (1905). "Palace Architecture of the Florentine Renaissance". Character of Renaissance Architecture. New York: The Macmillan Company – via Wikisource.
- Nash, W. G. (1990). "The Florentine or semi-Gothic arch". Brickwork. Nelson Thornes. ISBN 978-0-7487-0265-7.
