= Giovanni Michelazzi =

Italian architect (1879–1920)

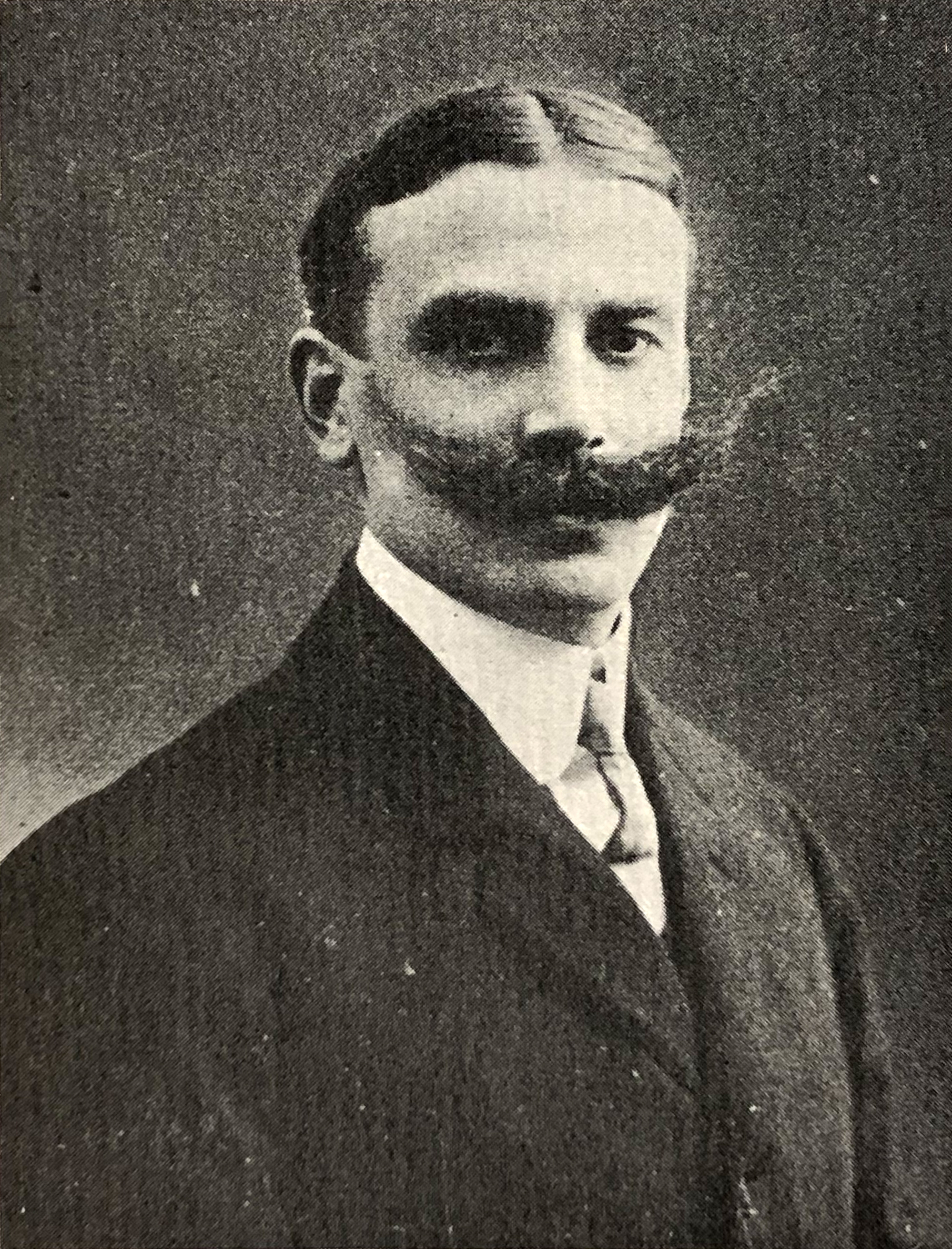
- Photograph of Giovanni Michelazzi, date unknown
- Born: 11 July 1879; Rome, Italy
- Died: 22 August 1920 (aged 41); Fiesole, Italy
- Occupation: Architect
- Buildings: Villino Broggi-Caraceni; Casa-Galleria Vichi; Villino Adolfo Lampredi

Giovanni Michelazzi (11 July 1879 – 22 August 1920) was an Italian architect and one of the most important exponents of the Liberty style (Art Nouveau) in Tuscany.

== Life and work ==
Born in Rome, he left the capital at an early age to move to Lucca and, later, to Florence, where he graduated in architecture in July 1901.

Michelazzi is the architect who is responsible for all the major Art Nouveau architecture in Florence, but due to Art Nouveau's extreme unpopularity in the subsequent decades, some of his buildings were demolished in the 1950s and 1960s. Only in the last sixty years has his work received scholarly attention, so much so now that critics have given it a prominent place in Italian architecture of the twentieth century. Like many Art Nouveau architects, he had a handlebar moustache.

His appearance as an architect on the Florentine scene dates back to 1902-03 with an intervention of initially little importance but which became highly suggestive of the future direction of his design methods in the Tuscan strand of Art Nouveau. It consisted of the addition to a traditional villa located in the nineteenth-century Viale del Poggio Imperiale in Florence of an iron and glass canopy, a new portal, and the complete overhaul of the balcony above, adding concrete uprights that attach to the wall with soft plasticity. With this small intervention Michelazzi clearly revealed the origins of his architectural language—that is, the French and Belgian Art Nouveau—with the delicate decorative elements emerging from a firm masonry structure.

Some stylistic elements that he frequently featured in his work included figures, particularly dragons. 1911 represented the peak of activity for Michelazzi with the realization of his masterpiece, the Casa-Galleria Vichi with its tall, narrow façade in the center of Florence. It was also, however, a turning point for his aesthetic vocabulary away from Art Nouveau, as seen in the Villino Galeotti-Flori from 1914, and continued with the Renaissance-revival style used for the house on via Giovanni Prati in 1915.

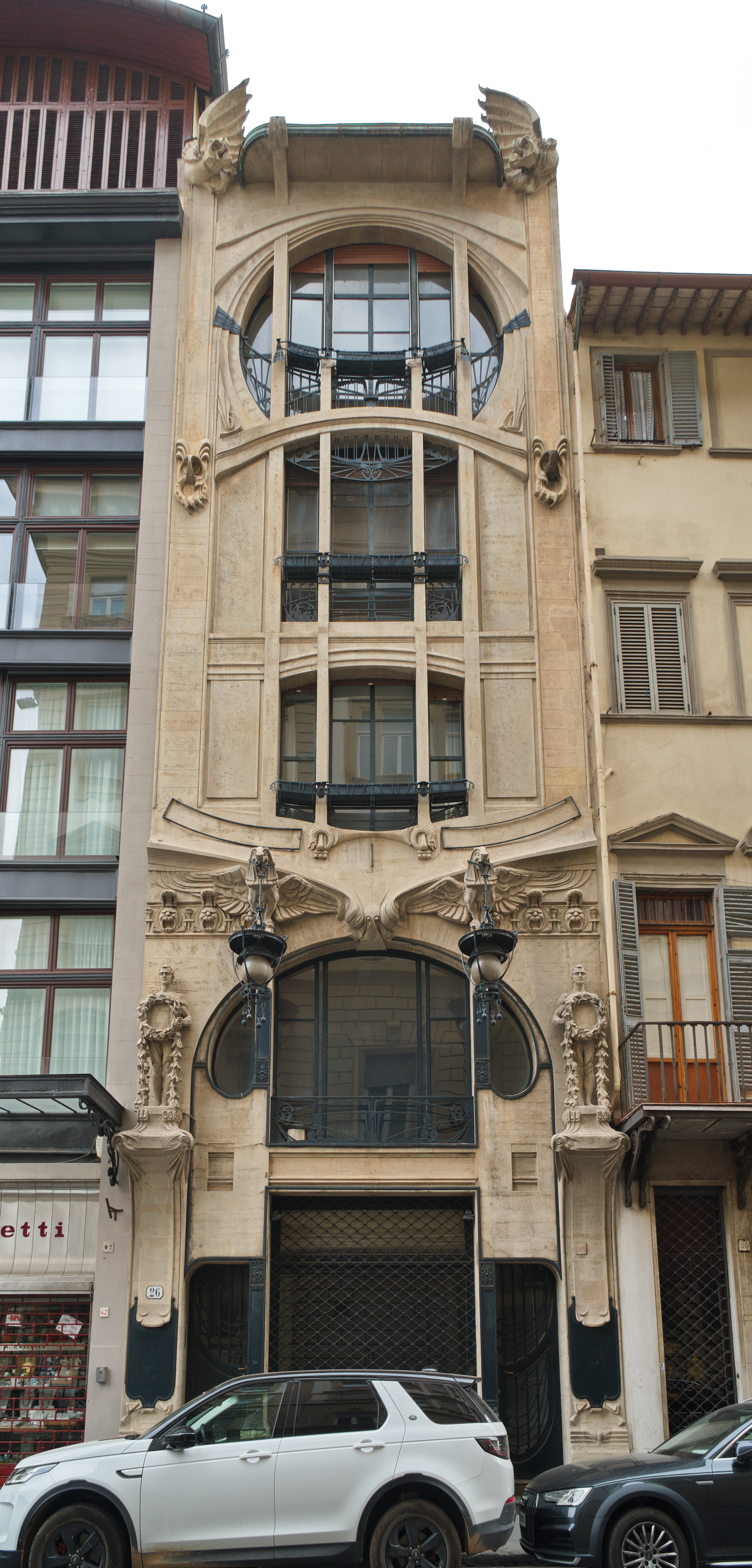
Casa-Galleria Vichi in Florence (1911)

He took his own life at just 41 years, on the night of 21–22 August 1920, in front of the Badia Fiesolana, in the San Domenico di Fiesole area, after losing custody of his child to his wife at the time of their separation. The place of death was the school where he intended to register his son. Incidentally, the same area in January 1901 had been the site of the death of Swiss painter and graphic designer Arnold Böcklin, who had bought a villa there in 1895, which had served as an inspiration for Michelazzi himself.

== Main works ==
- Project for a theater in Cairo, around 1897, with Giovanni Paciarelli
- Partial renovation of the villa on Viale del Poggio Imperiale 38 in Florence, 1902–03
- Villa on viale Michelangelo 59 in Florence, 1904, destroyed in 1962
- Villa Ventilari at viale Giuseppe Mazzini in Florence, from 1905, destroyed in 1956
- Villino Ravazzini at via Scipione Ammirato 101 in Florence, 1906-1907
- Villino di Adolfo Lampredi, at via Giano Della Bella 13, Florence, 1908-1909
- Villino di Giulio Lampredi, at via Giano Della Bella 9 in Florence, 1908-1910
- Shop for furniture maker Doney in Florence, 1908–09, destroyed (no photographic records survive)
- Villino Broggi-Caraceni at via Scipione Ammirato 99 in Florence, 1910-1911
- Casa-Galleria Vichi at Borgo Ognissanti 26 in Florence, 1911
- Villino Marzi at viale Michelangiolo 46 in Florence, 1912–13
- Palazzina Bini at via Guglielmo Marconi 27-29 in Florence, around 1913
- Building at via Giovanni Prati 13 in Florence, 1915
- Villino Galeotti-Flori at via XX Settembre 72 in Florence, 1914-1915
- Villino Baroncelli at via Giovanni Duprè 75 in Florence, 1918-1920

== Bibliography ==
- Rossanna Bossaglia, Liberty in Italia. Milan: Saggiatore, 1968.
- Carlo Cresti, Firenze 1896-1915: La Stagione del Liberty. Florence: Uniedit, 1978.
- ________, "Liberty a Firenze," in Antichità viva 5 (1970).
- G. K. Koenig, "Note su Giovanni Michelazzi," in Ingg. Arch. I. 6-7 (1961): 30-32.
- Luca Quattrocchi, Giovanni Michelazzi 1879-1920. Modena: Franco Cosimo Panini, 1993.
