= Palazzo Giugni =

Coordinates: 43.7752°N 11.2613°E

The Palazzo Giugni, also called the Palazzo Firenzuola, is a late-Renaissance or Mannerist architecture palace designed by Bartolomeo Ammanati, and located on Via degli Alfani #48 in the quartiere San Giovanni of Florence, region of Tuscany, Italy. It is located down the street from the Brunelleschi's church of Santa Maria degli Angeli.

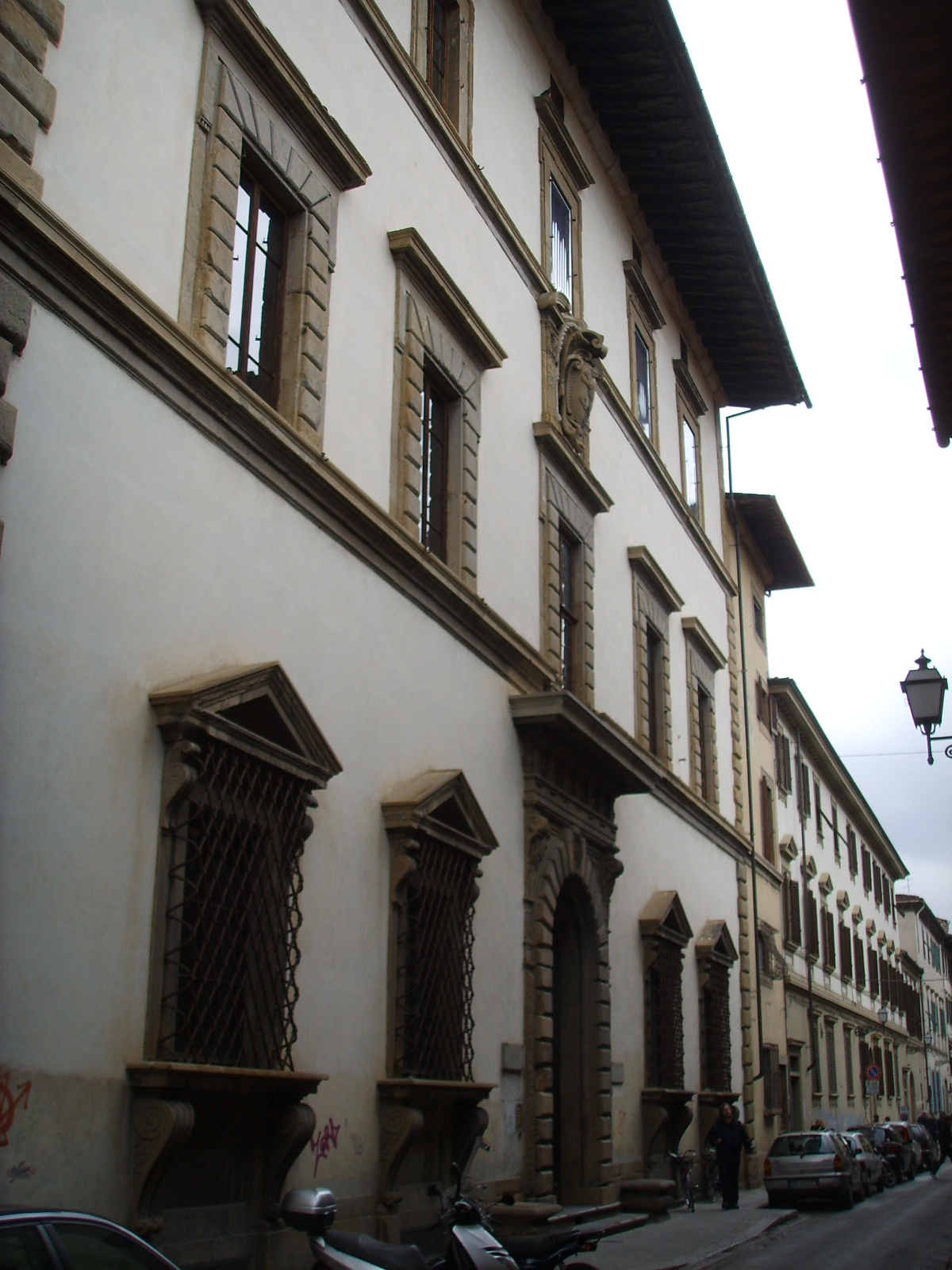
Facade on Via degli Alfani

== History ==
The palace was erected on land once occupied by the Camaldolese monastery of Santa Margherita delle Romite di Cafaggiolo (no longer extant). It was commissioned by Simone da Firenzuola from Ammanati in 1570 and completed in 1577. Ammanati also completed the building on Alfani #32. Simone had forbidden his children from selling the palace; however, lacking male descendants, in 1640, the palace came into the Giugni family with the marriage of Niccolò Giugni and Luisa Giraldi.

At this time it was enlarged and two wings were added. A gallery was decorated using designs of Massimiliano Soldani Benzi, with stuccoes by Giovanni Martino Portogalli and ceiling frescoes by Alessandro Gherardini celebrating Medici support of the arts. The marchese Giugni served as Guardaroba Maggiore to the Grand-Duke of Tuscany.

In 1830, the Giugni family sold the palace to the Della Porta family, and between 1829 and 1839, the English painter and writer Walter Savage Landor, resided with the family. Federico Fantozzi in his guide of Florence from 1842: described the palace as Beautiful, simple, and balanced in the facade, but more importantly, exceeding beautiful in the doric portal. The portal, with rusticated borders, is decorated with classical and other zoomorphic touches. Landor did criticize as a design flaw that the height of the portal exceeds the pediments above the windows. On the second floor in the center of the facade is the coat of arms of the Firenzuola made by the Opificio delle Pietre Dure in 1950. The original shield is now located under the porch. The ground floor windows perch on Mannerist brackets. Beyond the courtyard is a small garden on the back wall characterized by the fountain of Giant overwhelmed by Boulders or Fall of Titan (1690) attributed to the sculptor Lorenzo Migliorini.

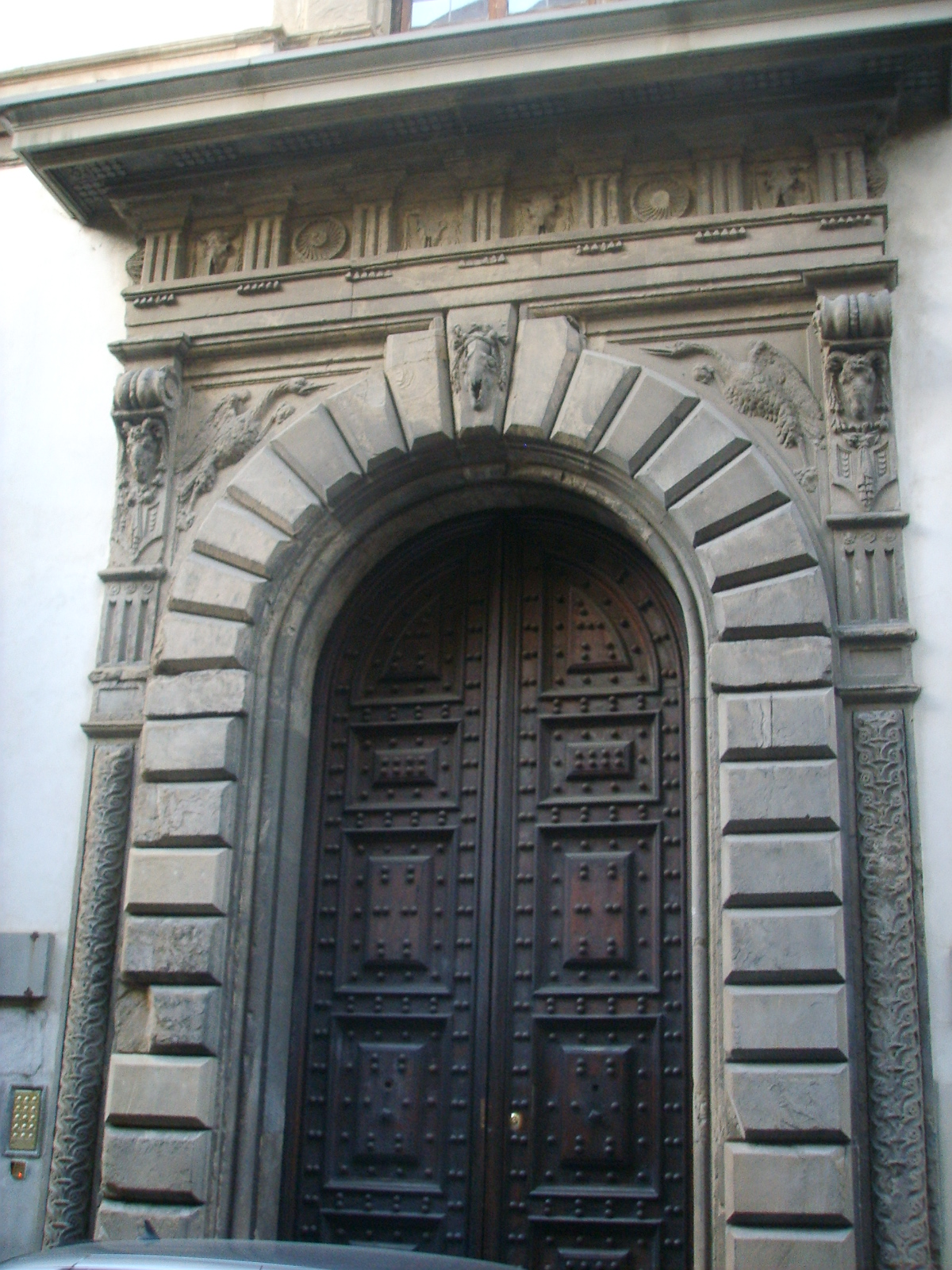
Portal of the palace

The palace underwent restoration complete by 1871 under the guidance of Emilio De Fabris, and in the 1970s by Lando Bartoli. In 2015, the palace housed offices of both industry and from a high school for girls.
