= Palazzo Pola e Todescan =

Building in Florence, Italy

Coordinates: 43°46′20.45″N 11°15′12.79″E

The Palazzo Pola e Todescan is a building in central Florence, Italy. The palazzo was completed in 1903. It is in the Art Nouveau style and was designed by architect Giuseppe Paciarelli.

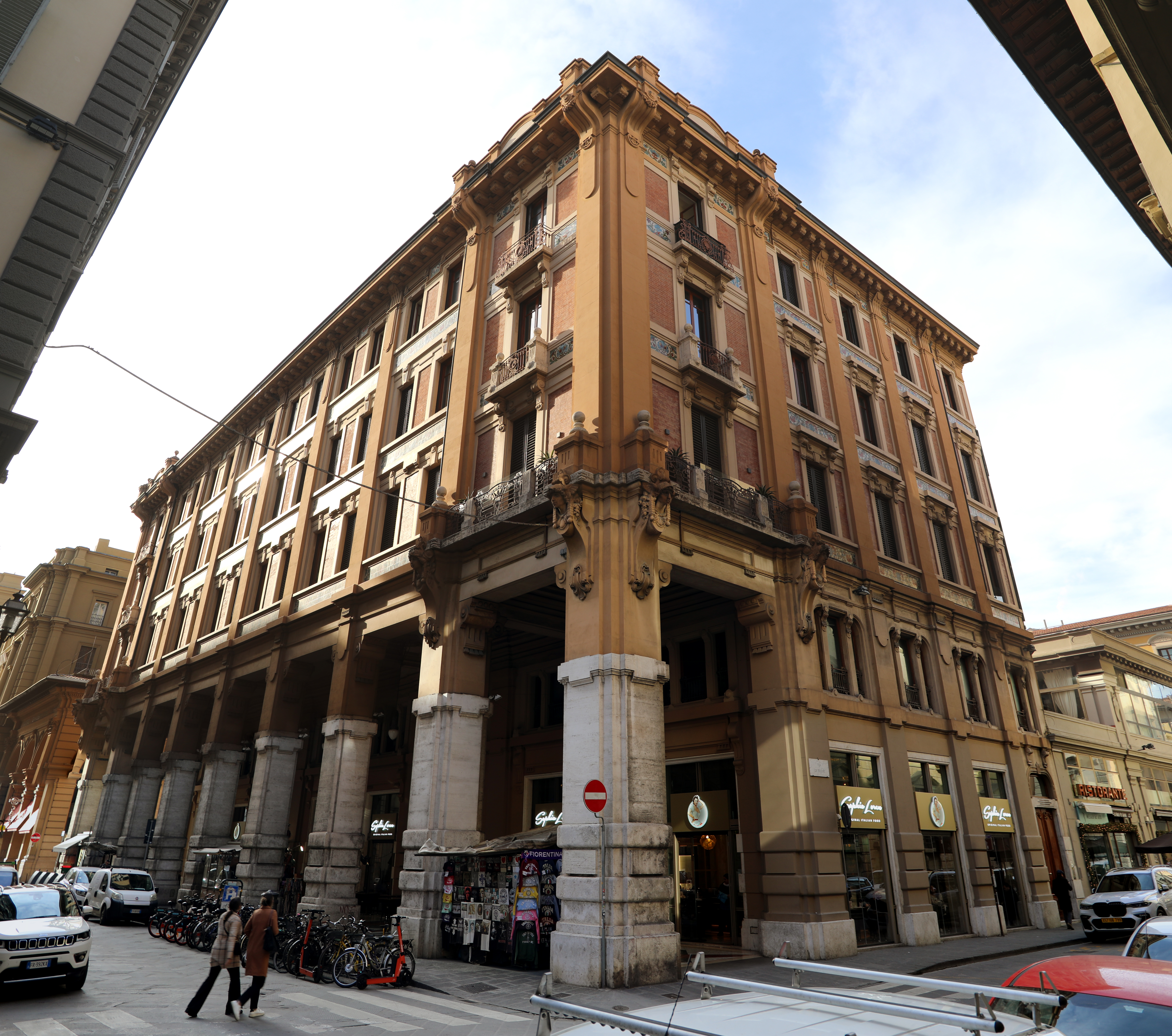
Exterior of the palazzo

The building was initially built as residence for Counts of Pola. It housed the Florence branch of Pola & Todescan, a store selling clothing made in Britain. As of 2015, it is occupied by a bank.
