= Torre dei Belfredelli =

Tower in Florence, Italy

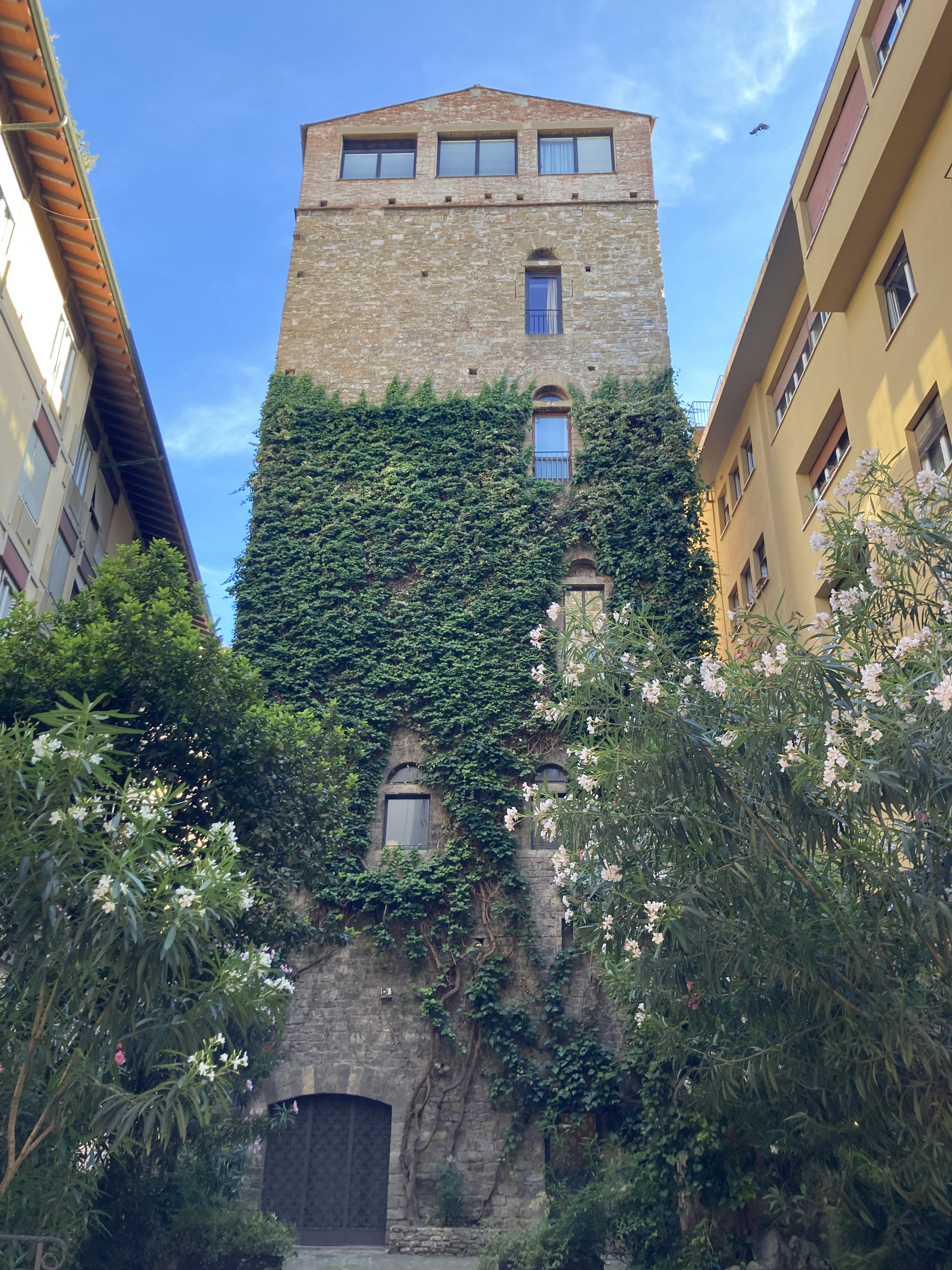
- The tower in 2024

- Location within Florence Torre dei Belfredelli (Tuscany) Torre dei Belfredelli (Italy)

General information
- Location: Via dei Ramaglianti, 2, 50125 Firenze FI, Italy
- Coordinates: 43.7676°N 11.2514°E

Technical details
- Material: Stone bricks
- Floor count: 7

The Torre dei Belfredelli is a 13th-century, seven-story medieval tower in Florence, Italy, and one of the tallest buildings in the city. The Torre dei Ramaglianti is located behind.

== History ==
The Belfredellis, who built the tower, were a family part of the House of Welf. After losing the Battle of Montaperti to the Hohenstaufen in 1260, the Hohenstaufen took power over Florence and damaged part of the tower. The Welfs won the Battle of Benevento in 1266 and were able to return to the city. The del Corno and Guiducci families followed the Belfredellis as the owners of the tower after they became extinct. In August 1944, the tower was damaged again after some German mines exploded nearby. The interior was drastically changed in the following reconstruction and an attic floor was added.

== Description ==
The building is made from rows of stone bricks. Some of the building's entrances are covered by an archivolt. The top floor is a newer addition, characterized by large glass windows. The tower's main entrance is flanked by a small garden. The most recognizable feature of the tower is the ivy covering about half the height of the building. A two-bedroom apartment inside the tower can be rented.
