= Santo Stefano al Ponte =

Church building in Florence, Italy

Coordinates: 43°46′7.22″N 11°15′15.28″E

Church of Santo Stefano at Ponte (Chiesa di Santo Stefano al Ponte)
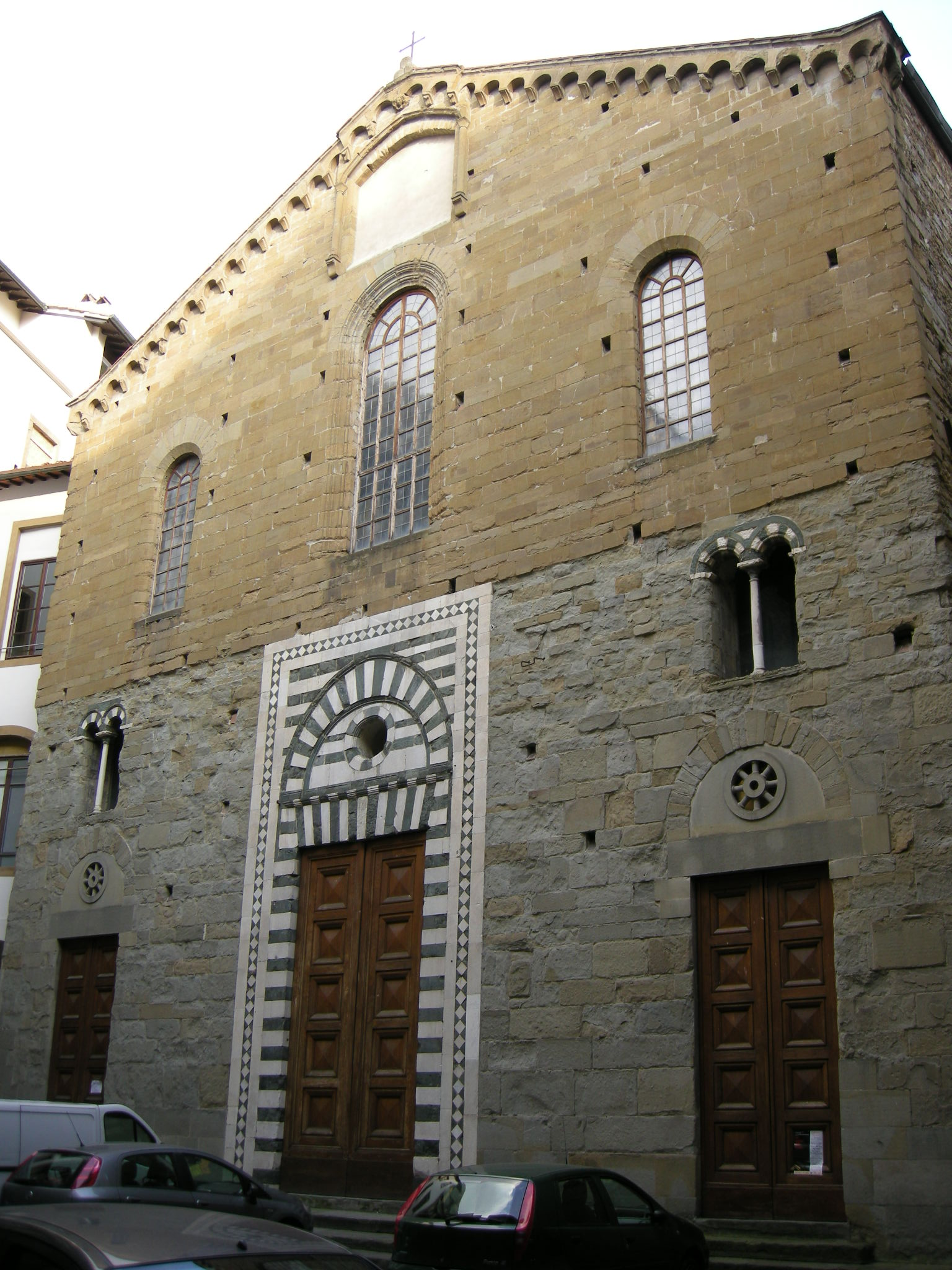
- Façade of Santo Stefano at Ponte showing the original marble-work around the portal

Religion
- Affiliation: Roman Catholic
- Province: Florence

Location
- Location: Florence, Italy
- Interactive map of Church of Santo Stefano at Ponte (Chiesa di Santo Stefano al Ponte)

Architecture
- Type: Church

Santo Stefano al Ponte is a Romanesque-style, Roman Catholic church, located in the Piazza of the same name, just off the Via Por Santa Maria, near the Ponte Vecchio, in Florence, region of Tuscany, Italy. The church is presently used as a concert hall.

== History ==
The church was originally constructed in the 11th and 12th century in a Romanesque style with a polychrome marble facade. The interior featured three aisles. In the 14th century, the exterior was renovated. Of the original facade, only the marble work around the portal remains. Between 1631 and 1655, the interior of the church was renovated to convert the three aisles to an open hall. A crypt was added and the interior was redesigned to include a choir.

In 1373, the church was temporarily used by Boccaccio to deliver lectures on the Divine Comedy.

The annexed diocesan museum houses a panel with a Madonna by Giotto. Inside the church are artworks by Matteo Rosselli (Vision of San Lorenzo); Niccolò Lapi; Giottino; Mariotto di Nardo; Ferdinando Tacca (bronze bas-relief of Martyrdom of San Stefano, 1656); Francesco Bianchi Buonavita; Cigoli (Copy of Santi di Tito's Deposition); Francesco Curradi (Death of Santa Cecilia before Urban I, 1641); Francesco Morosini (St Paul on Road to Tarsus); Mauro Soderini (St Zanobi resuscitates a child, 1745), and Santi di Tito (Madonna and Saints, after 1585).
