= Palazzo Orlandini del Beccuto =

Building in Florence, Italy

Coordinates: 43°46′22.54″N 11°15′11.01″E

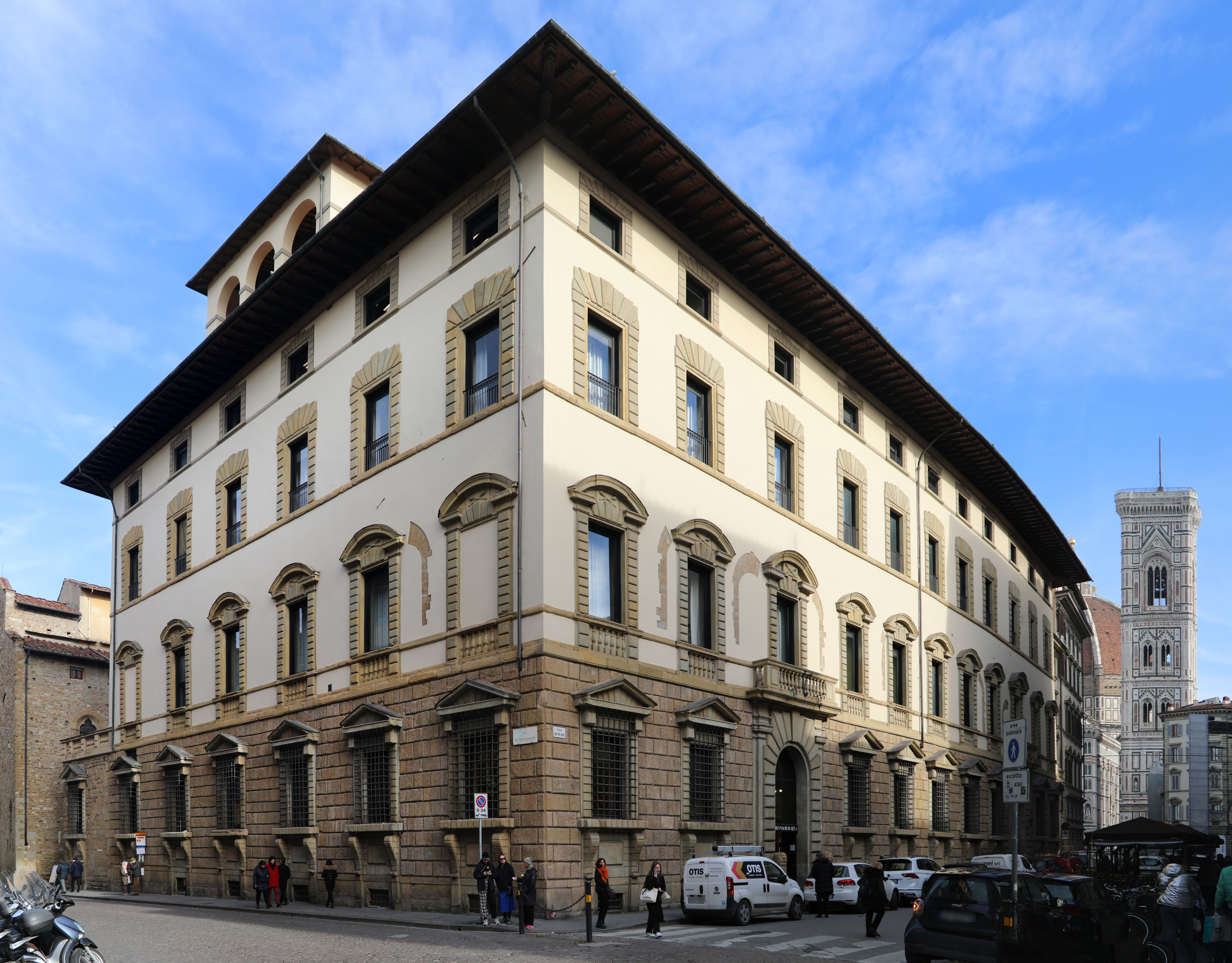
Palazzo Orlandini del Beccuto

The Palazzo Orlandini del Beccuto, also known as Palazzo Gondi di Francia, is a palace located with entrance on Via de' Pecori #6-8 in central Florence, region of Tuscany Italy.

The palace was built at the site occupied by one of the homes of the Gondi family since 1496, but also incorporated other houses and palaces including that of the Orlandini del Beccuto. The present palace was designed in 1679 mainly by Antonio Maria Ferri, with perhaps some involvement by Ciro Ferri, and the courtyard was designed by Ignazio Del Rosso. The property once included a garden across via de' Pecori, with an 1803 layout by Luigi Bettarini, however relinquished in the 1830s and later during the widening of the street.

In the 19th century it served as home to prominent foreigners, including Jerome Bonaparte circa 1840, and the British ambassador Sir Augustus Paget (1867-1871), and is wife, Walburga, Lady Paget.

Over the decades the palace had varied refurbishments, including by the engineer Cesare Fortini in the final quarter of the 19th century. In 1913, it was purchased by the Bank of Monte dei Paschi di Siena, who still has offices here.

The walls of the piano nobile was frescoed once by Pietro Dandini, Antonio Domenico Gabbiani, Alessandro Gherardini, and a ceiling was frescoed by followers of Poccetti. While Bonaparte was in residence, he had murals painted by Luigi Ademollo and Cosimo Meritoni, including a celebration of the masters of Florentine art, including depictions of Brunelleschi, Leonardo, Michelangelo, and Andrea del Sarto.
