= Simone del Pollaiolo =

Florentine architect

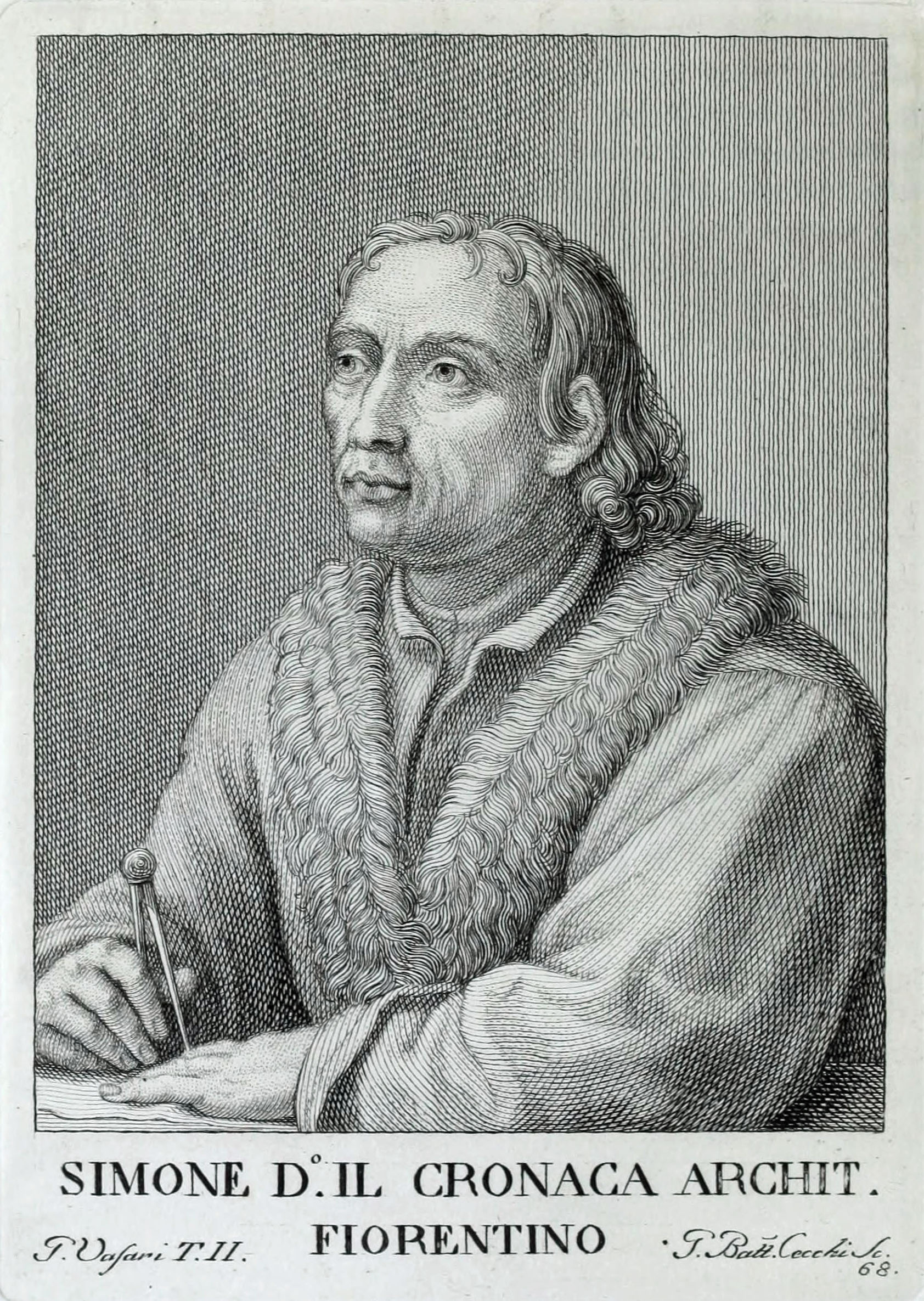
Simone del Pollaiolo

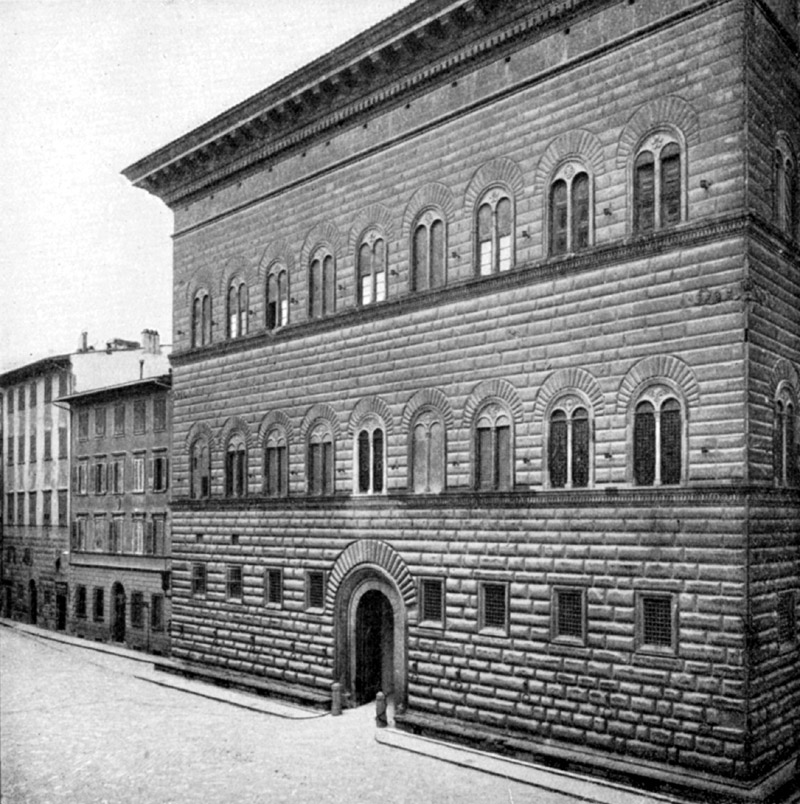
Palazzo Strozzi, built by Simone Pollaiolo.

Simone del Pollaiolo (1457–1508) was a Florentine architect who was commonly known as Il Cronaca ("The Chronicle One").

Pollaiolo was born in Florence, the nephew of the better-known brothers Antonio and Piero Benci who had the nickname Pollaiuolo or Pollaiolo ("Hen-House Keeper" in Italian, from pollaio).

Simone was later given his nickname Il Cronaca. The reason for this nickname has much to do with his style and is explained by Giorgio Vasari. In order to learn more of the architectural art, he marched to Rome around 1470 to observe the old ruins. On his return to Florence he wrote meticulous descriptions and well-reasoned commentary on his observations, which were described as in a chronicle.

Pollaiolo was responsible for the completion of Strozzi Palace after the death of Benedetto da Maiano in 1497. He died in Florence in 1508.
