= San Remigio, Florence =

Church building in Florence, Italy

Coordinates: 43.768448°N 11.258009°E

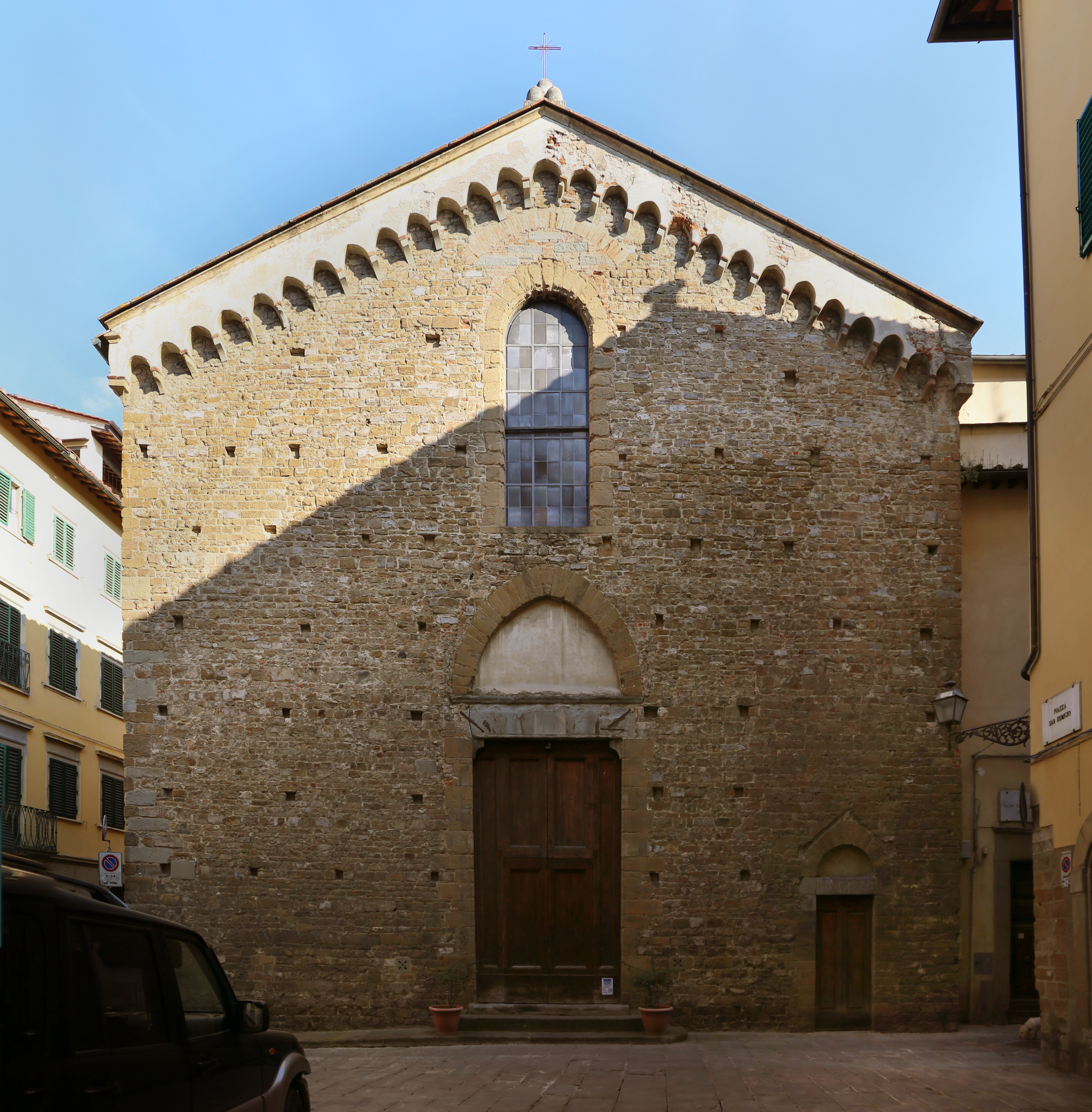
Exterior of San Remigio di Firenze showing the hanging arches along the roof line.

San Remigio di Firenze is a church in Florence, Italy.

The church was founded around the year 1000. It is dedicated to Saint Remigius. In the 13th century, the church was reconstructed to feature a triangle-shaped facade with hanging arches along the roof line. The interior still reflects the original Gothic architecture with ogive arches and octagonal columns along the three aisles.
