= Ugo Procacci =

Italian art historian, civil servant and restorer (1905–1991)

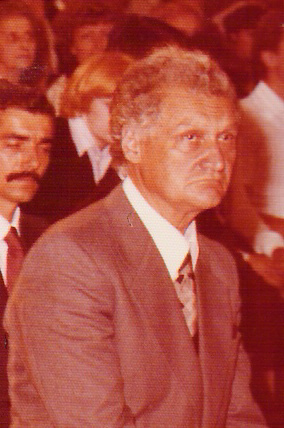
- Ugo Procacci, 1978
- Born: March 31, 1905; Florence, Tuscany, Italy
- Died: February 19, 1991 (aged 85); Florence, Tuscany, Italy
- Occupations: Italian art historian; superintendent of Florence's museums; Uffizi Gallery’s chief restorer
- Organization: Gabinetto di Restauro dei Dipinti (est. 1932)

Ugo Procacci (1905–1991) was an Italian art historian and superintendent of Florence's museums who played a significant role in the development of art conservation practices in Italy. He is also associated with efforts to safeguard cultural heritage during the 1966 flood of the Arno River.

== Career ==
Procacci was a pioneer in the study of artistic techniques and restoration. In 1932, he founded the Gabinetto di Restauro dei Dipinti in Florence, integrating conservation work with historical research. As superintendent of Florence's museums, he contributed to the development of institutional approaches to restoration and preservation.

== Role in the 1966 Florence flood ==
When the Arno River flooded Florence in November 1966, Procacci went to the Uffizi Gallery with museum staff to begin rescuing artworks threatened by water and mud. As superintendent, he helped coordinate the initial response and damage assessment of artworks affected by the disaster, including major works of art in Florence's collections.

The flood caused extensive damage to Florence's cultural heritage and prompted long-term restoration initiatives and international collaboration.

== Legacy ==
Procacci's work in conservation and restoration contributed to the development of modern approaches to the study and preservation of artworks in Florence. His involvement in the response to the 1966 flood is associated with broader institutional efforts to stabilise and restore damaged cultural heritage.
