= Emilio De Fabris =

Italian architect (1808–1883)

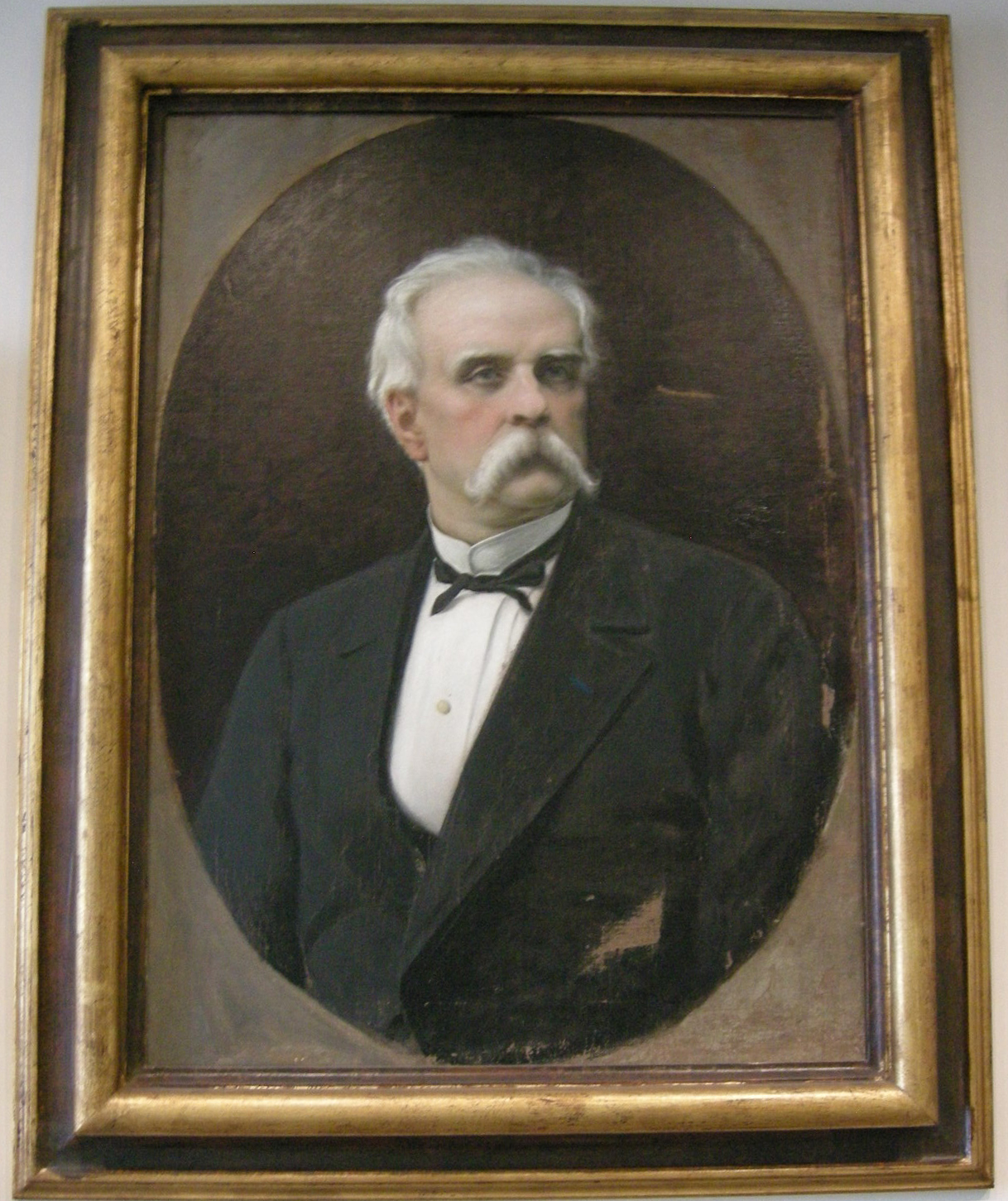
Painting of Emilio De Fabris's portrait

Emilio De Fabris (28 October 1808 – 3 June 1883) was an Italian architect best known for his design of the west facade of the Santa Maria del Fiore cathedral in Florence, Italy.

De Fabris was born in Florence, Italy. He initially studied at the Academy of Fine Arts in Florence, then traveled to Rome, where he met the archeologist Antonio Nibby and to Venice where he met the historian and art-critic Pietro Selvatico. In 1857–1860, he helped design, alongside Michelangelo Maiorfi, the Palazzo della Borsa in Florence. He was professor at the Florentine Academy of Fine Arts and Architect to the Opera di Santa Croce.

== Work on the Cathedral of Santa Maria del Fiore ==
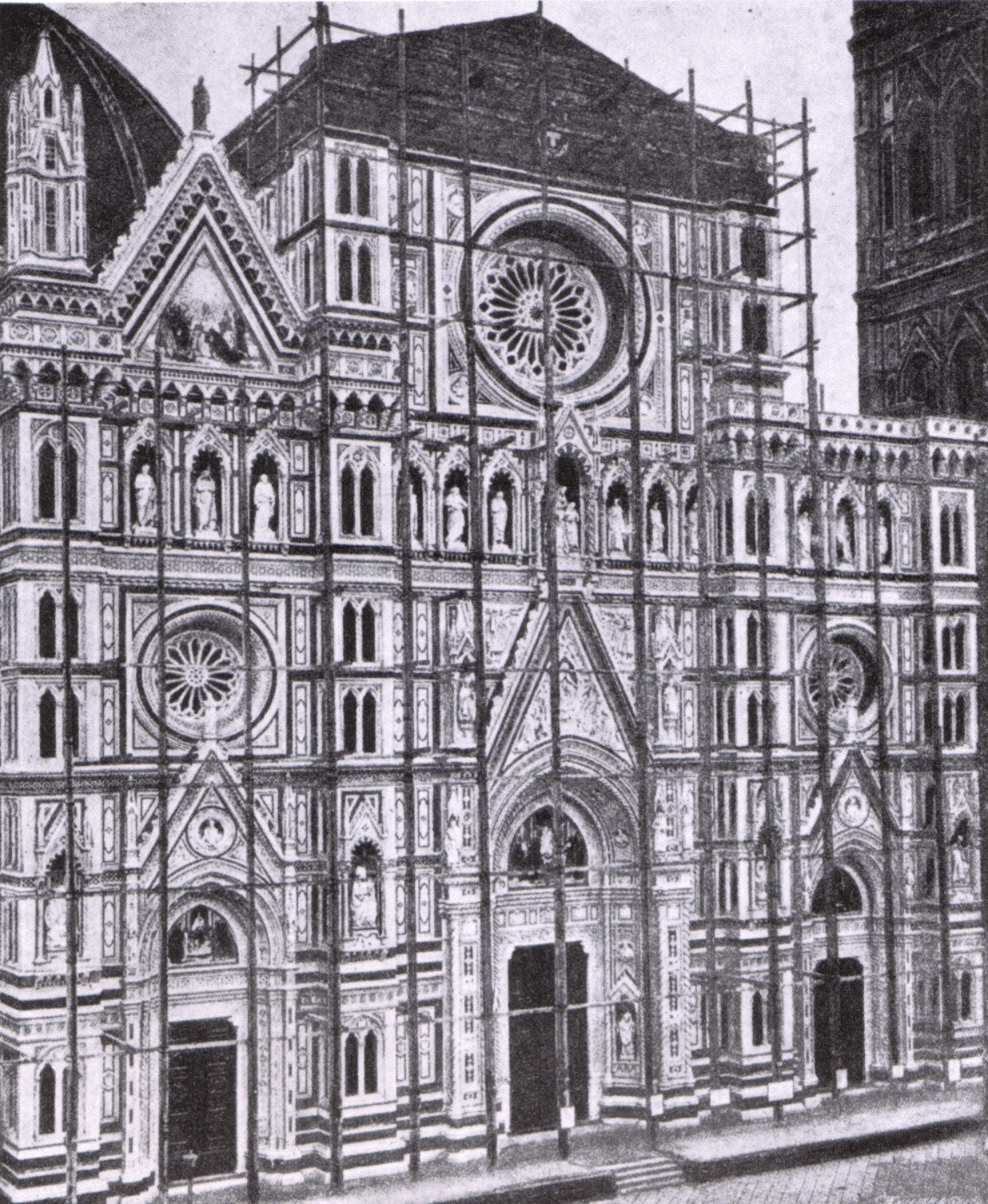
The façade of the Santa Maria del Fiore in Florence

The original facade design for Santa Maria del Fiore, by Giotto, was found outdated for the cathedral and so a series of three competitions was held to modify Giotto's original design, keeping with the main lines of the structure. The challenge for the competition was to create a facade which brought together two periods in architecture: the Gothic style, which had faded out, and the Renaissance style, which was more recent. In 1871, Fabris' design won, and he immediately went to work embellishing the cathedral with red, green, and white marble. Fabris died in 1883.
