= Badia Fiesolana =

Catholic abbey in Fiesole, Italy

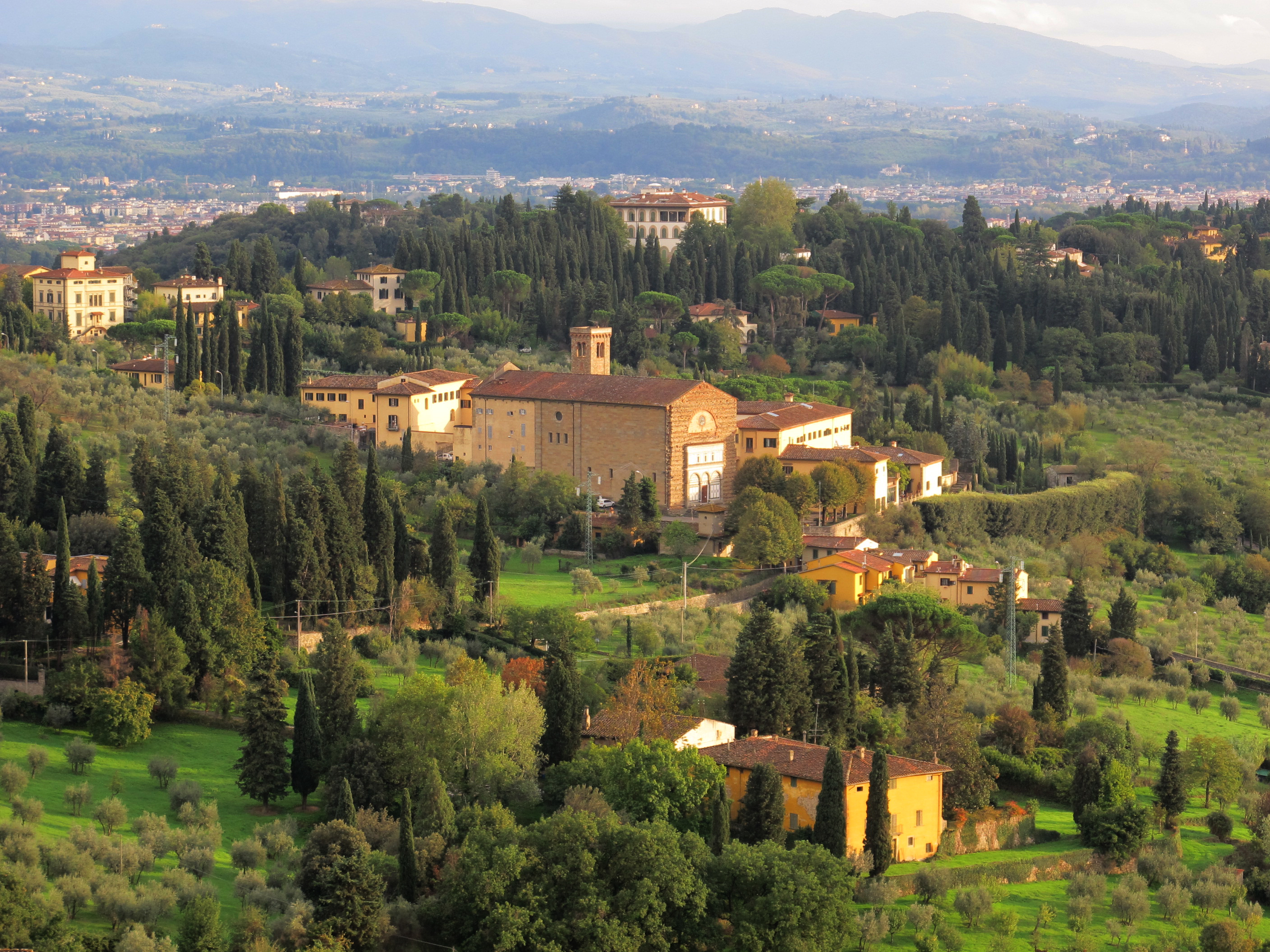
- Interactive map of Badia Fiesolana

Monastery information
- Established: 1025
- Dedication: Bartholomew the Apostle
- Diocese: Roman Catholic Diocese of Fiesole

Site
- Location: Fiesole, Italy

The Badia Fiesolana was a medieval and renaissance period Roman Catholic monastery located in the town of Fiesole (in the quarter of San Domenico), northeast of Florence, Italy. Since 1976, the building is the main seat of the European University Institute. The original Camaldolese monks building was completed in 1028 and was subsequently transferred to Benedictines from Montecassino and the Canons Regular of St. Augustine.

== History ==
The monastery was built between 1025-1028 on the location of a former chapel dedicated to Saint Peter and Saint Romulus. Originally, it bore the name of Saint Bartholomew. The present appearance dates from between 1456 and 1467, after the architect Michelozzo was commissioned by Cosimo de' Medici for a Renaissance style expansion.

== Current use ==
The former convent is now the seat of the European University Institute.

== Images ==
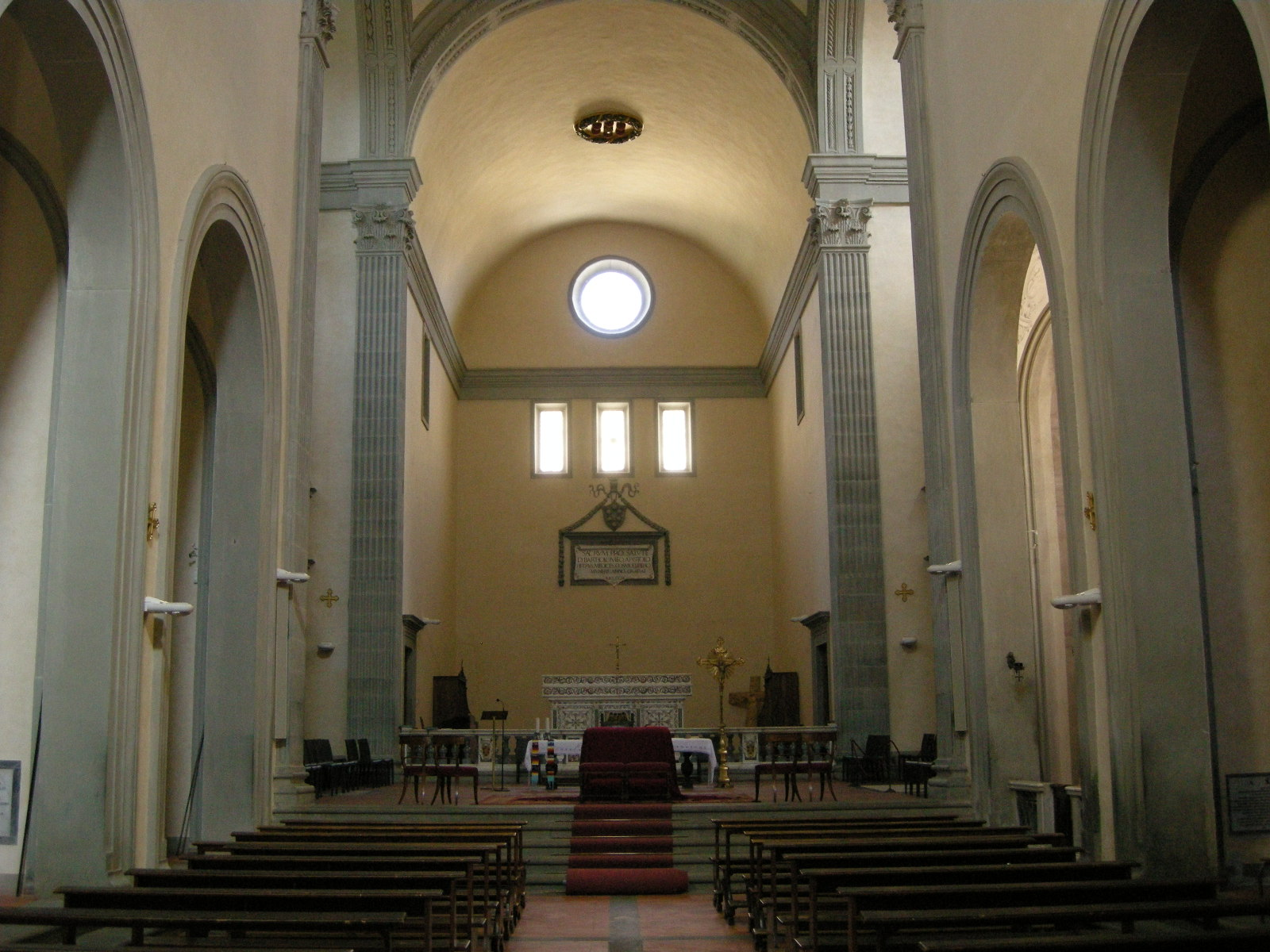
Interior

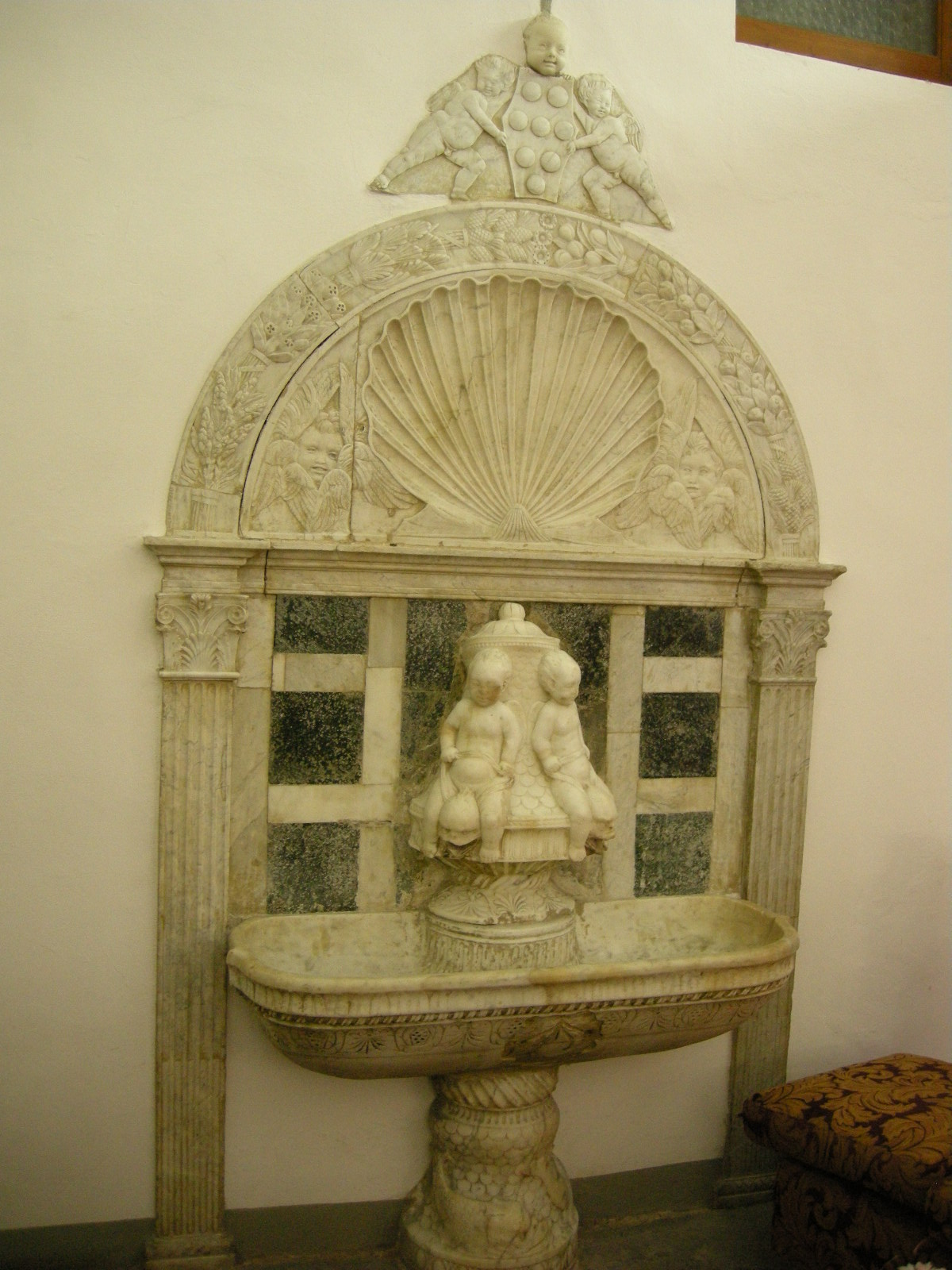
Fountain

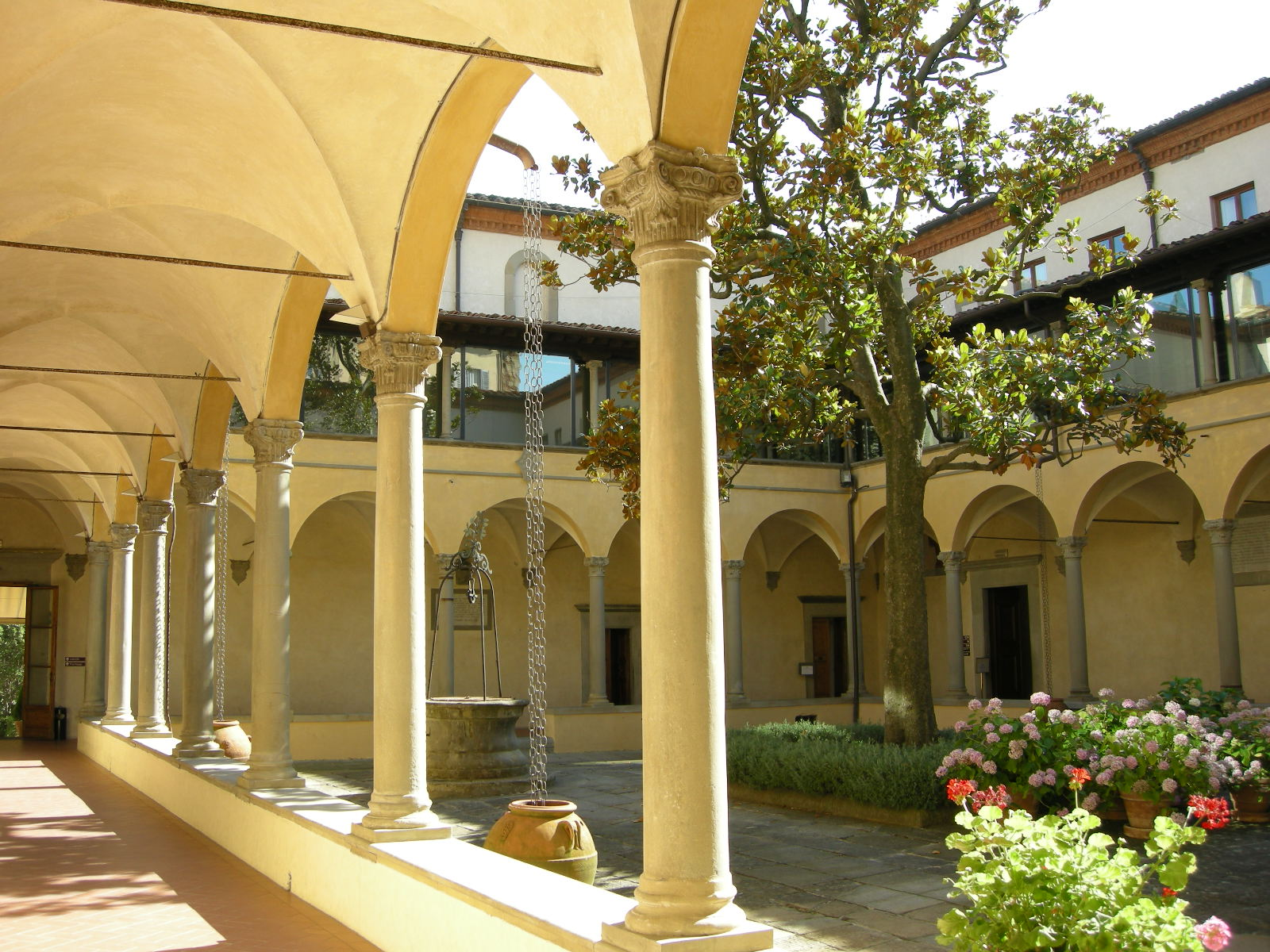
Renaissance cloister

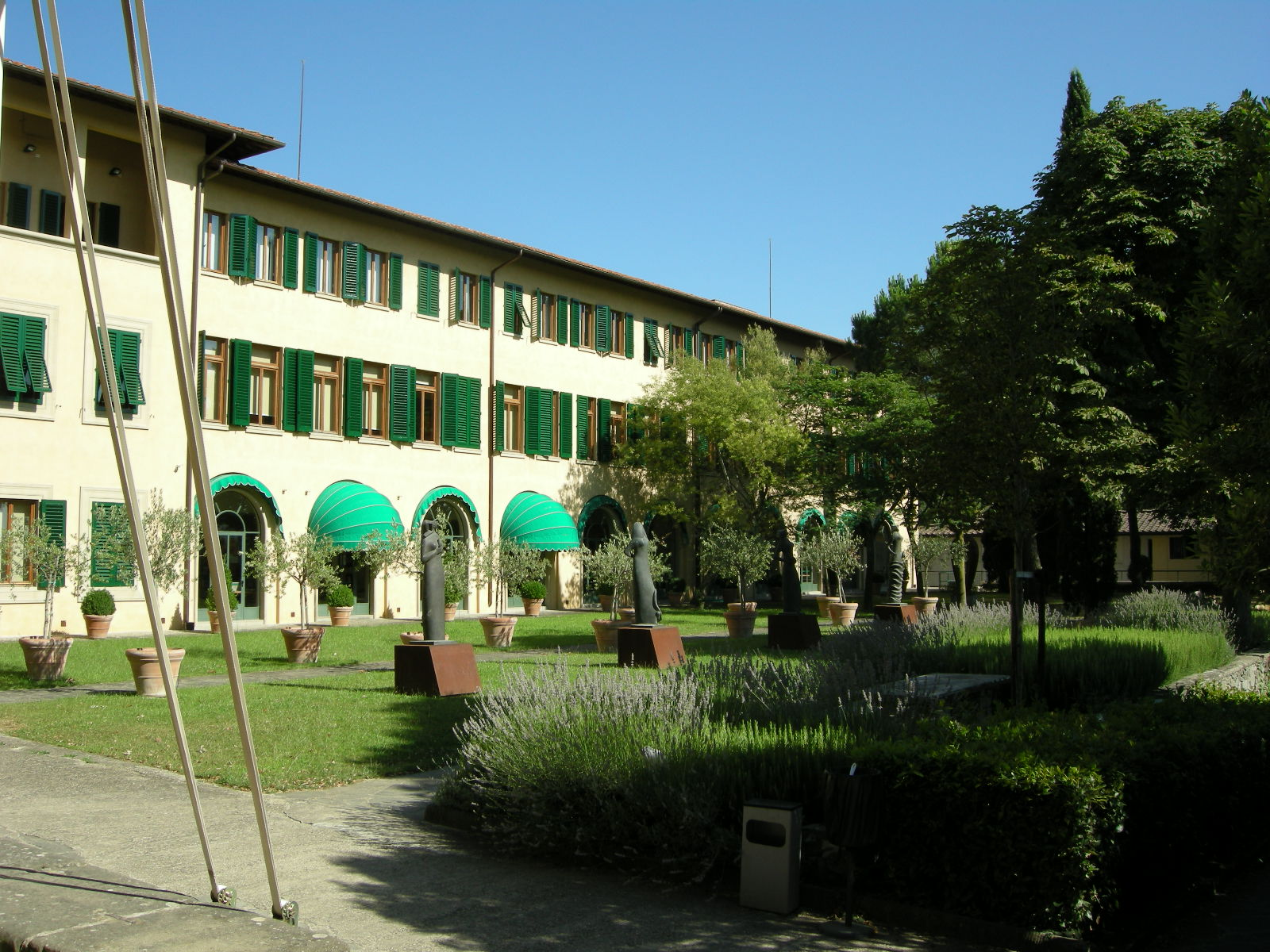
The former convent, currently looking out on the EUI's library wing. This facility was also the home for the Class of 1969-1970 Italian California International Program group.

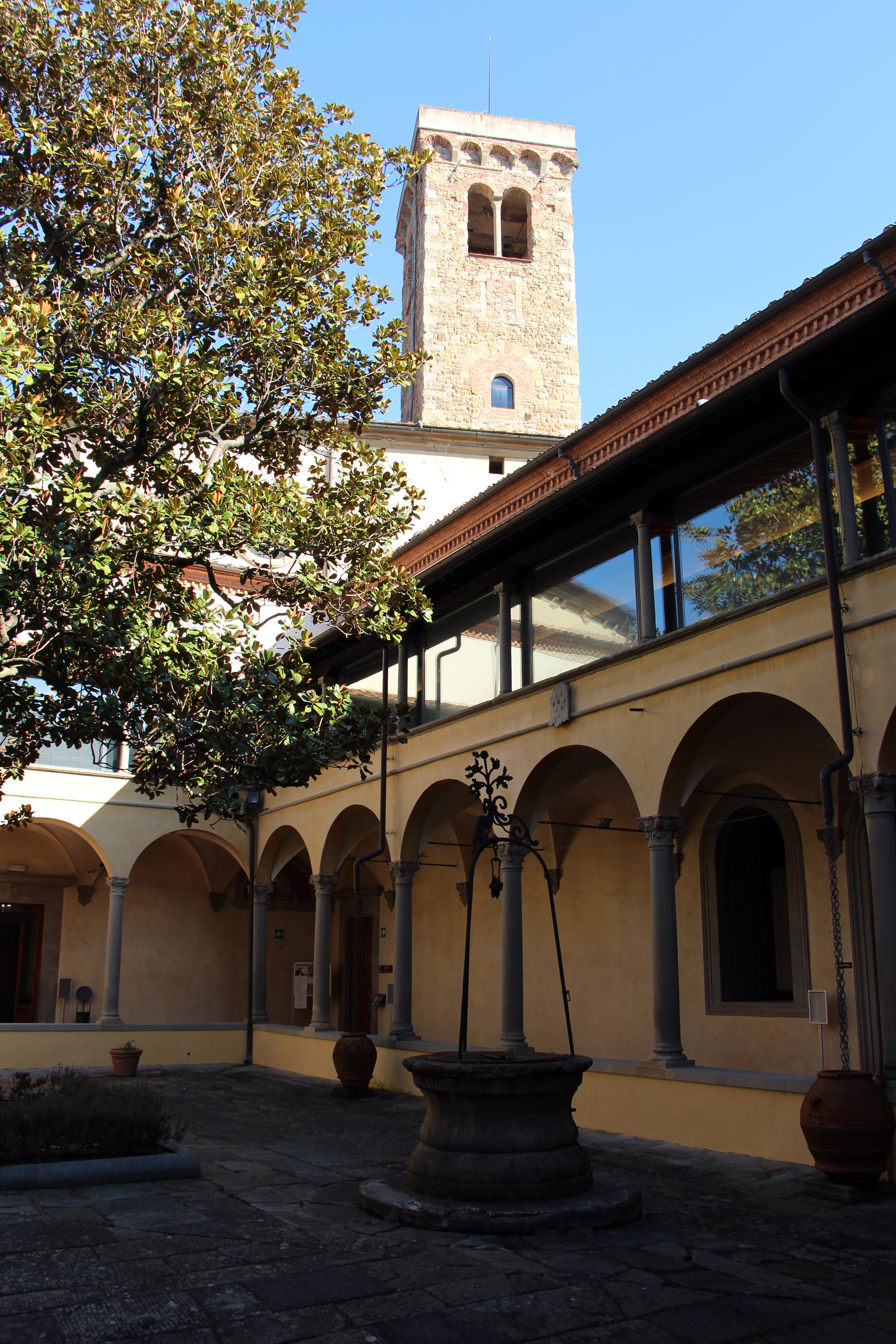
The construction or modification of the belfry dates to the mid-twelfth century or a little later.

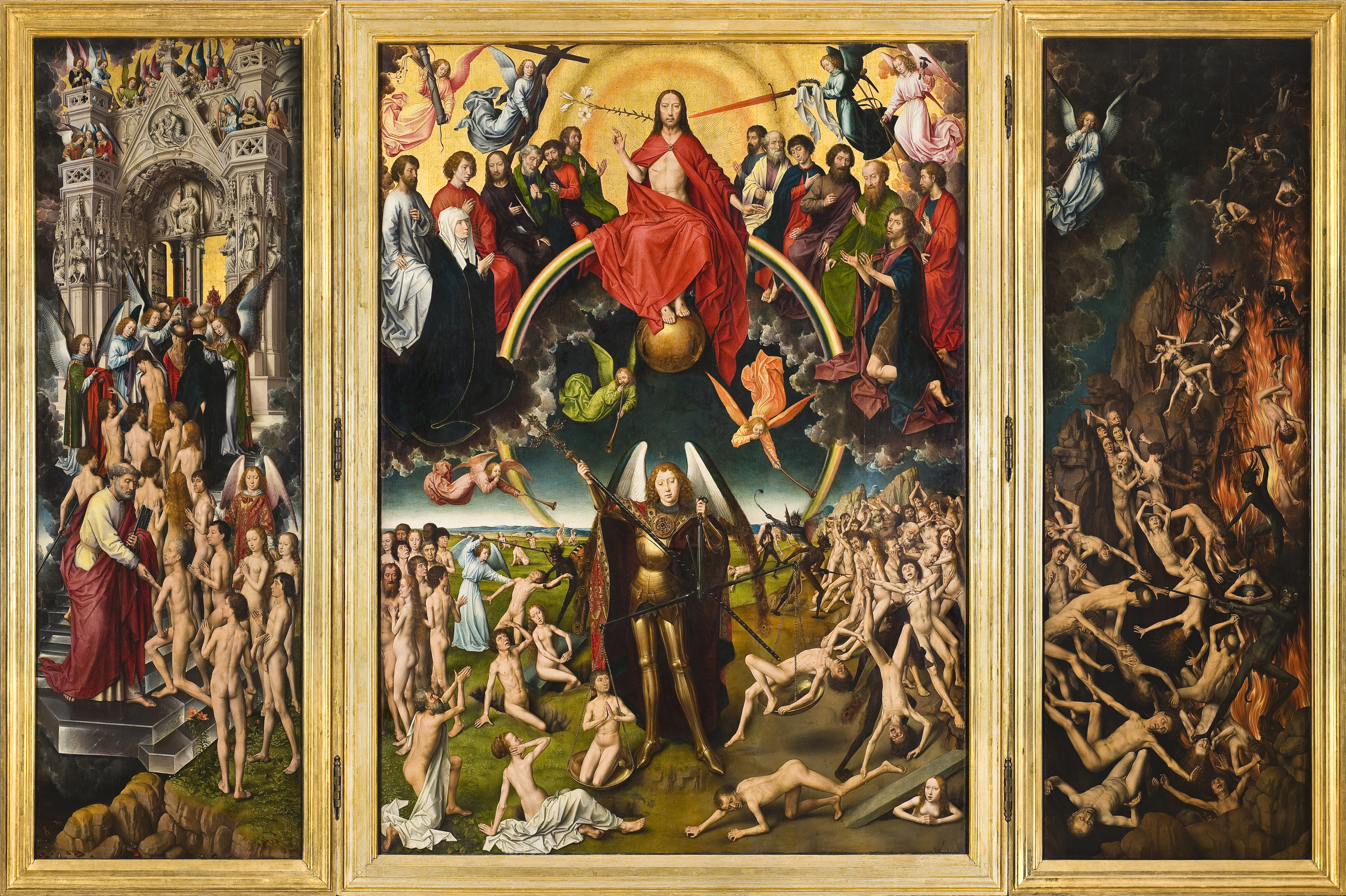
The Last Judgement by Hans Memling triptych was commissioned around 1467 in Bruges by Angelo di Jacopo Tani (1415–1482) for the Chapel of St. Michael in the Badia Fiesolana but was captured at sea by Paul Beneke, a privateer from Danzig.
