= Ponte Santa Trinita =

Bridge in Florence, Italy

Ponte Santa Trìnita
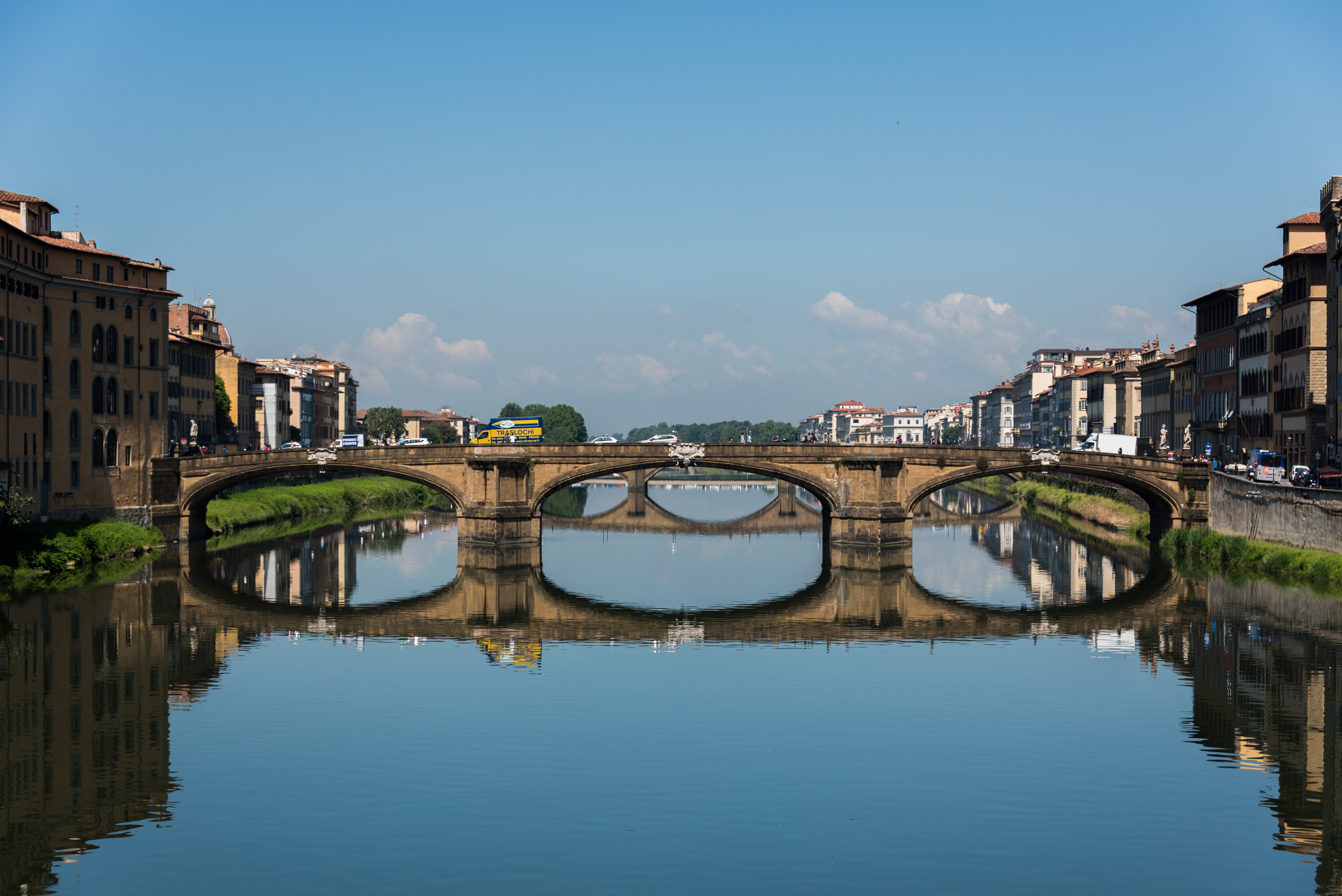
- Ponte Santa Trìnita. View from Ponte Vecchio.
- Material: Limestone
- Created: Renaissance Period (1566–1569) by Bartolomeo Ammannati.
- Present location: Florence, Italy

The Ponte Santa Trinita (Italian for "Holy Trinity Bridge", named for the ancient church in the nearest stretch of via de' Tornabuoni) is a Renaissance bridge in Florence, Italy, spanning the Arno. The Ponte Santa Trìnita is the oldest elliptic arch bridge in the world, characterised by three flattened ellipses. The outside spans each measure 29 m (95 ft) with the centre span being 32 m (105 ft) in length. The two neighbouring bridges are the Ponte Vecchio, to the east, and the Ponte alla Carraia to the west.

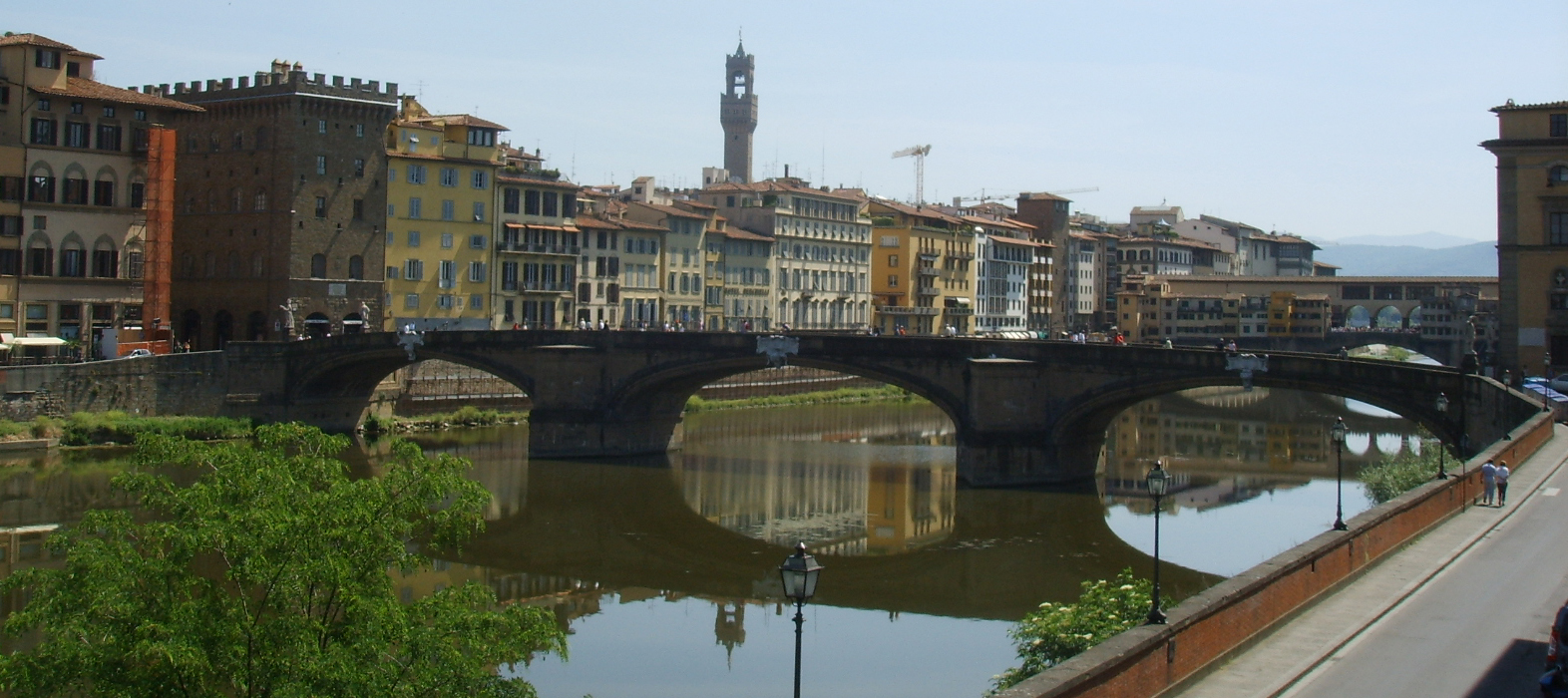
Ponte Santa Trinita

The bridge was constructed by the Florentine architect Bartolomeo Ammannati from 1567 to 1569. Its site, downstream of the Ponte Vecchio, is a major link in the medieval street plan of Florence, which has been bridged at this site since the 13th century. The wooden bridge of 1252 collapsed under the weight of a crowd seven years later, and was rebuilt in stone; this structure was in turn destroyed by a flood in 1269 and again in 1333. The bridge of five arches constructed by Taddeo Gaddi was also destroyed in the flood of 1557, which occasioned Ammannati's replacement. Four ornamental statues of the Seasons were added to the bridge in 1608, as part of the wedding celebrations of Cosimo II de' Medici with Maria Magdalena of Austria: Spring by Pietro Francavilla, Summer and Autumn by Giovanni Caccini, and Winter by Taddeo Landini.

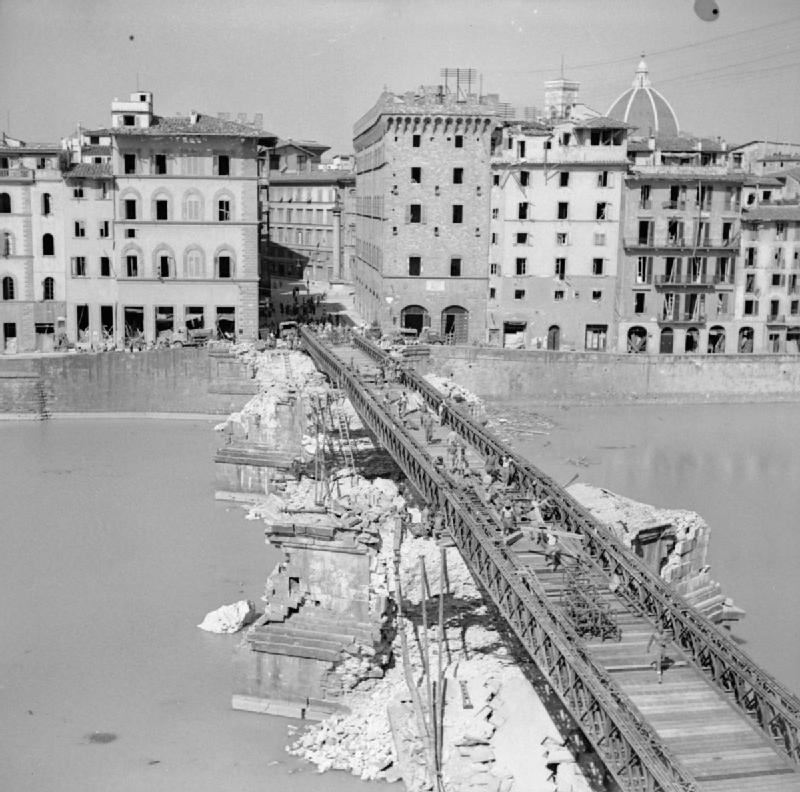
Bailey bridge built on the piers of the original Ponte Santa Trinita

On the night between 3 and 4 August 1944, the bridge was destroyed by retreating German troops on the advance of the British 8th Army. A Bailey bridge was built for temporary use by the Royal Engineers. The bridge was reconstructed in 1958 with original stones raised from the Arno or taken from the same quarry of Boboli gardens, under the direction of architect Riccardo Gizdulich, who examined Florentine archives, and engineer Emilio Brizzi. The missing head of Primavera (Spring) was recovered from the bed of the Arno in October 1961.

== See also ==
- Santa Trinita – Church in Florence, Italy
- Palazzo Spini Feroni – Gothic palace in Florence
- Piazza Santa Trinita – Square in Florence, Tuscany, Italy
