= Torre dei Gianfigliazzi =

Gianfigliazzi Tower
- Torre dei Gianfigliazzi
- Gianfigliazzi Tower
- Interactive map of the Gianfigliazzi Tower area

General information
- Type: Hotel
- Architectural style: Romanesque
- Location: Tuscany, Via Tornabuoni, Florence, Italy
- Coordinates: 43°46′11.64″N 11°15′2.97″E

The Torre dei Gianfigliazzi is a Romanesque-style medieval tower-residence located on Via de' Tornabuoni #1 in central Florence, region of Tuscany, Italy. It can be seen rising adjacent to the left of the church of Santa Trinita. It now hosts a hotel.

== History ==
A large tower-residence, it was built in medieval times for the Guelph family of the Ruggerini, and was totally demolished after the Guelph were expelled from Florence in 1260. Reconstructed, it was acquired by the Fastelli first, and then, in the late 14th century, to the Gianfigliazzi, who owned it until their extinction in 1760.

In the early 19th century it was used by the local Nobles' Academy, and housed figures such as Alessandro Manzoni, Louis Bonaparte and Vittorio Alfieri. In 1841 it was extensively renovated, with the addition of merlons inspired by the nearby Palazzo Spini Feroni and the opening of new windows.

== Sources ==
- Mercanti, Lara; Straffi, Giovanni (2003). Le torri di Firenze e del suo territorio. Florence: Alinea.
