= Piazza Santa Trinita =

Square in Florence, Tuscany, Italy

Coordinates: 43°46′12.29″N 11°15′4.48″E

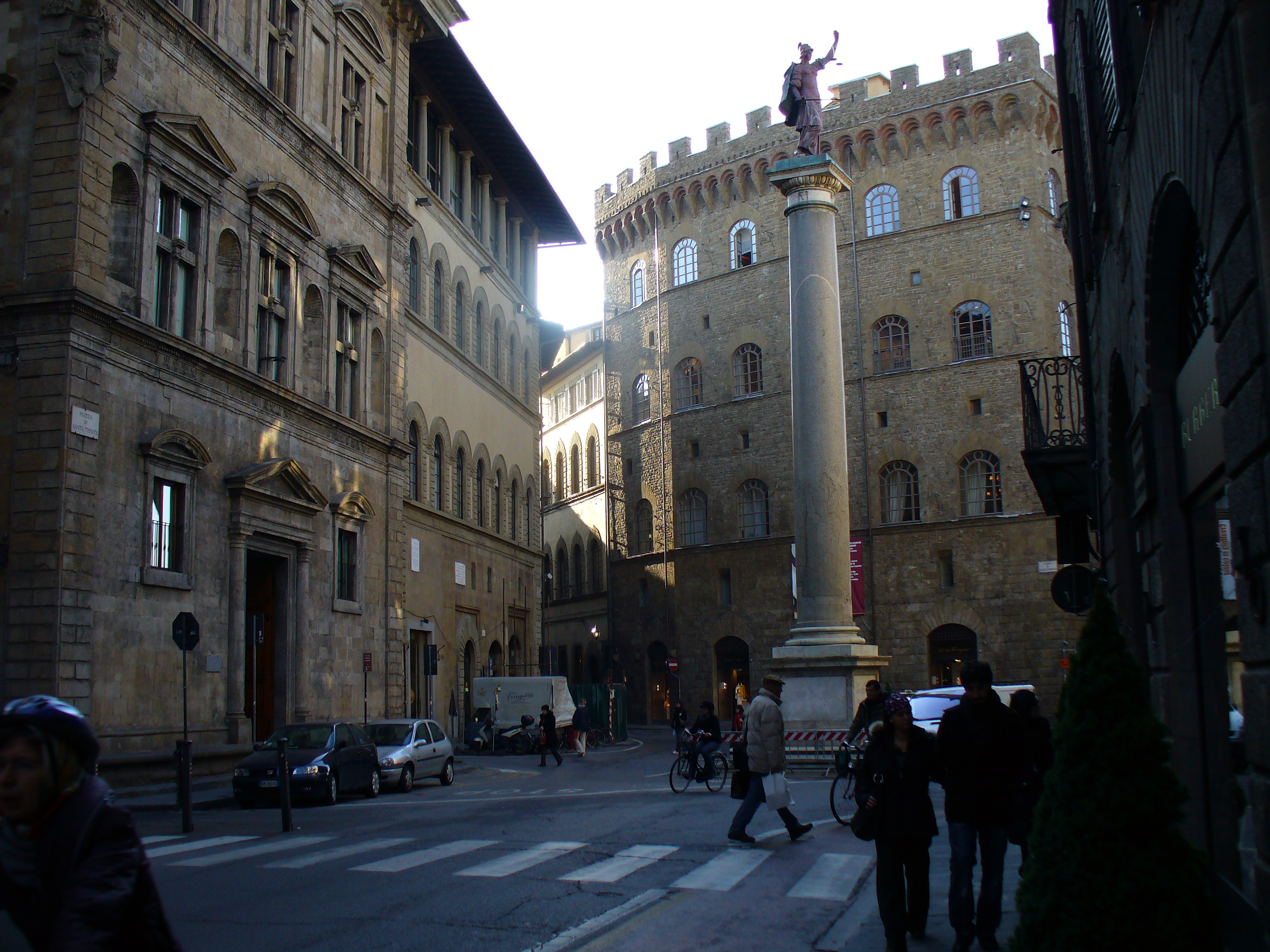
Piazza Santa Trinita

The Piazza Santa Trinita is a triangular square in Florence, Italy, named after the church of Santa Trinita on the west side of the square. The piazza is traversed by the Via de' Tornabuoni. Near the middle of the square is an ancient Roman column known as the Column of Justice due to the sculpture of "Justice" on the top. Several Gothic and Renaissance palaces surround the square, these include:

- Palazzo Bartolini Salimbeni
- Palazzo Buondelmonti (15th century)
- Palazzo Minerbetti (14th century)
- Palazzo Spini Feroni (14th century), presently the home of the Salvatore Ferragamo Museum and headquarters of the fashion house of that name.
