= Hotel Helvetia & Bristol =

Hotel in Florence, Italy

Coordinates: 43.7719°N 11.2522°E

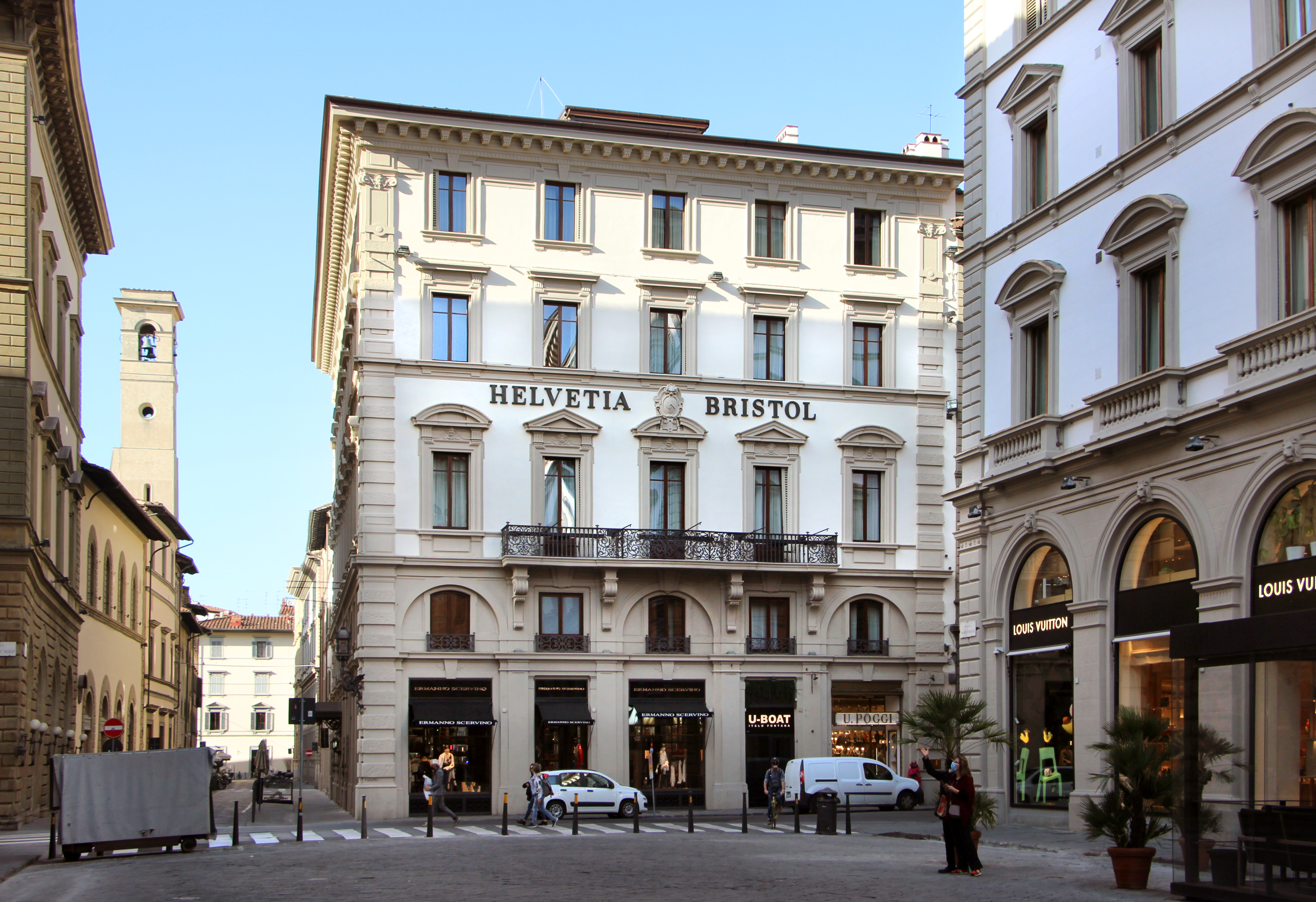
Hotel Helvetia & Bristol

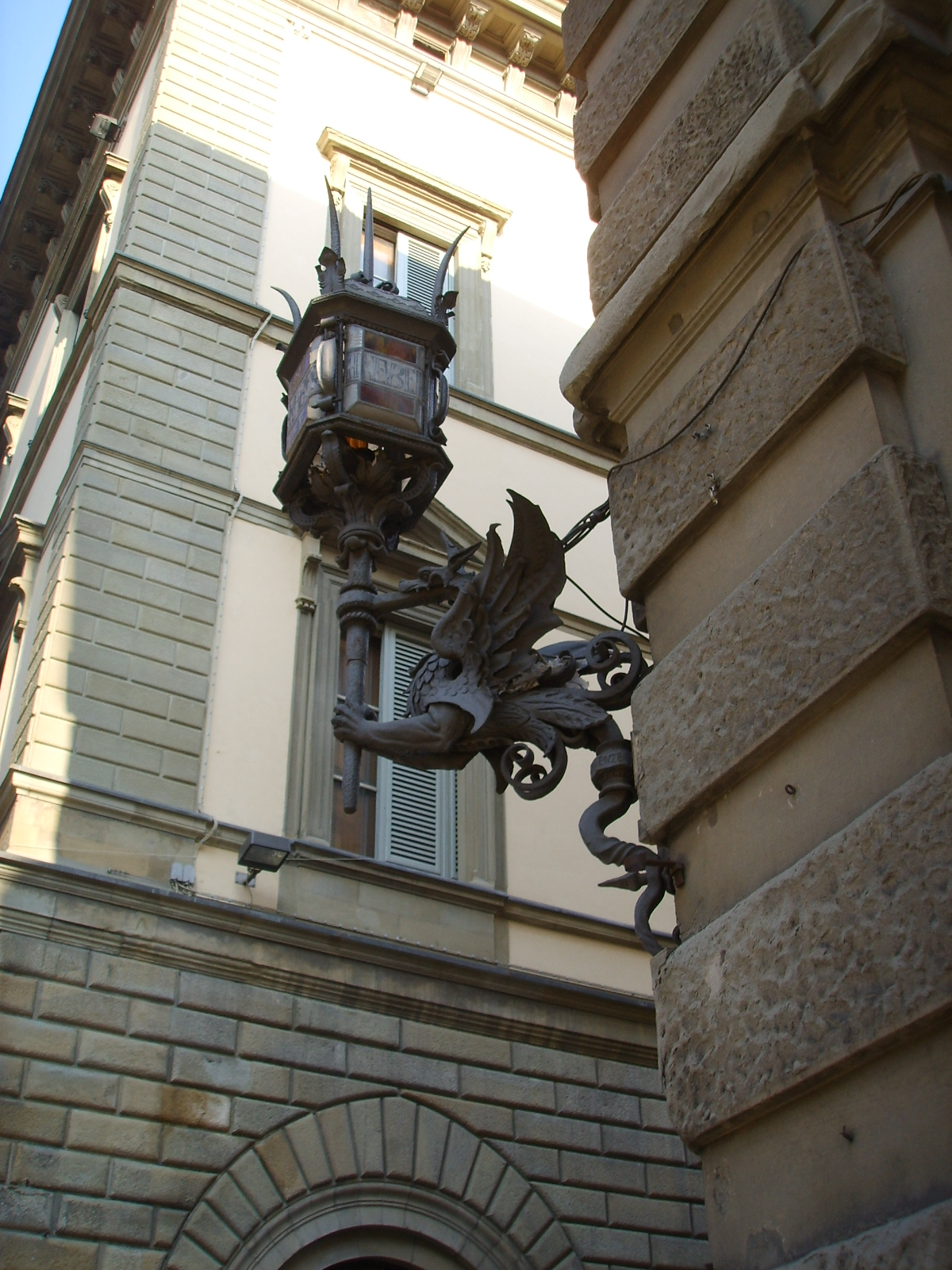
Lantern of Hotel Helvetia & Bristol

Hotel Helvetia & Bristol is a five-star boutique hotel in Florence, Italy. It is managed by Starhotels Group and is a member of the Leading Hotels of the World.

== Location ==
The hotel is set in heart of the Historic Centre of Florence, named a World Heritage Site by UNESCO in 1982. It lies between Piazza della Repubblica and Via de' Tornabuoni. The entrance is located on Via dei Pescioni and the main façade overlooks Piazza Strozzi. Ponte Vecchio, Florence Cathedral and Piazza della Signoria are located within walking distance.

== History ==
The palazzo that houses the hotel dates to the late 19th century. Originally created to attract the wealthy aristocrats of Victorian England, the inner-city townhouse hosted artists and European royalty including Igor Stravinsky, Giorgio de Chirico, and members of Danish Royal Family and Dutch monarchy.

== Bar and restaurant ==
The hotel houses Bar Bibendum and Hostaria Bibendum.
