= San Francesco di Paola, Florence =

Church building in Florence, Italy

Coordinates: 43°45′54″N 11°14′13″E

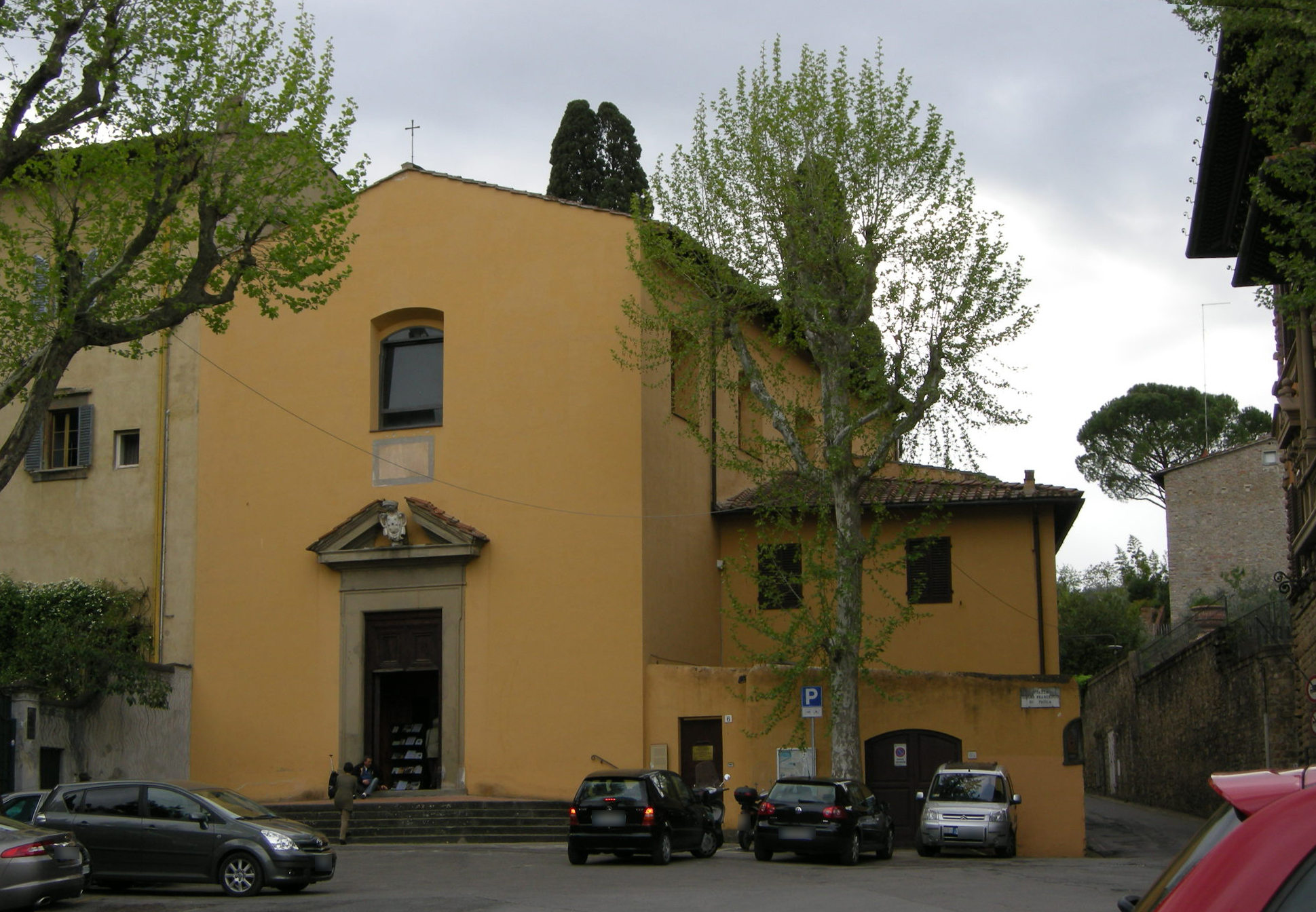
San Francesco di Paola

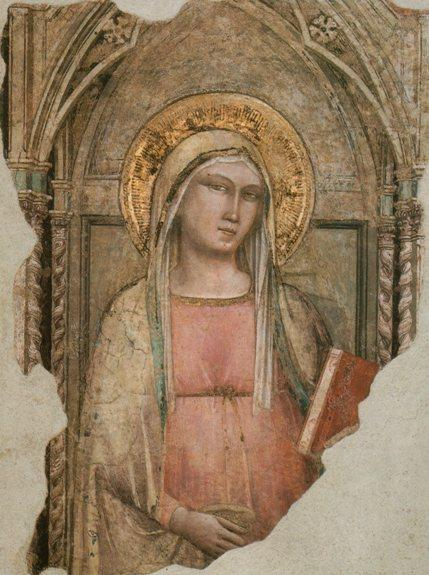
Madonna del Parto by Taddeo Gaddi

San Francesco di Paola is a small Renaissance-style Roman Catholic church in the Oltrarno quarter of Florence, central Italy.

== History ==
It was built starting from the 1580s as part of a new monastery of the Minims, known as the Convento del Bel Riposo. The church was dedicated to the founder of the order, St. Francis of Paola. The structure was completed, with the financial patronage of Alessandro Cammillo degli Strozzi, a member of the Strozzi family, around 1643, including interventions by architect Gherardo Silvani in 1638. Silvani, Giovanni Caccini, and Valerio Cioli contributed to the sculptural and stucco decoration of the church. When the Minims were suppressed at the end of the 18th century, the annexed convent was turned into a patrician villa by the Federighi family in 1873. The church, restored in 1996–2005, is now a local parish church along with the nearby San Vito e Modesto a Bellosguardo.

The main work of art is a fresco of Madonna del Parto ("Our Lady of Parturition") by Taddeo Gaddi, which was transferred here in 1785 from the former church of San Pier Maggiore. Other internal sights include a 15th-century wooden crucifix, the Annunciation attributed to Giovan Battista Vanni, a 1602 Portrait of St. Francis of Paola, a painting by Ignazio Hugford and two works by Giuseppe Moriani (1716).

The tomb monument of the Bishop Benozzo Federighi, sculpted by Luca della Robbia, once in San Francesco di Paola, was moved to San Pancrazio in 1809, and in 1895 to the church of Santa Trinita.
