= Rosa Vercellana =

Morganatic wife of Victor Emmanuel II (1833–1885)

- Countess of Mirafiori and Fontanafredda
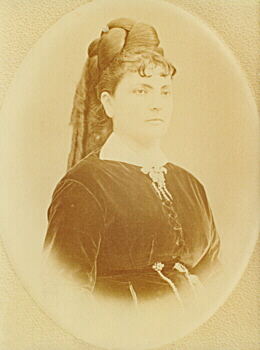
- Rosa Teresa Vercellana, the ‘Bela Rosina’
- Full name: Maria Rosa Teresa Aloisia Vercellana
- Born: 11 June 1833; Nice, Kingdom of Sardinia
- Baptised: 15 June 1833
- Died: 26 December 1885 (aged 52); Turin, Piedmont, Italy
- Buried: Mausoleum of La Bela Rosin, Turin
- Spouse: Victor Emmanuel II of Italy (morganatic) (m. 1869; died 1878)
- Issue: Vittoria Guerrieri; Emanuele Guerrieri, Count of Mirafiori and Fontanafredda
- Father: Giovanni Battista Vercellana
- Mother: Maria Teresa Griglio

Rosa Vercellana, 1st Countess of Mirafiori and Fontanafredda (11 June 1833 – 26 December 1885), commonly known as 'Rosina' and, in Piedmontese, as La Bela Rosin, was the mistress and later wife of Victor Emmanuel II, King of Italy. Despite this, the morganatic status of her marriage meant that she was never recognized as Queen of Italy.

== Life ==
She was born in Nice, then part of the Kingdom of Sardinia, the youngest child of Giovanni Battista Vercellana and his wife, Maria Teresa Griglio. Four days later she was baptised as Maria Rosa Teresa Aloisia.

Her father, from Moncalvo in the Province of Asti, had been a standard bearer in the Napoleonic Imperial Guard. After the fall of Napoleon, he was appointed an officer in the King's Guards and commanded the royal garrison at the hunting estate of Racconigi by 1847. There, while living with her family, the fourteen-year-old Rosa met Crown Prince Victor Emmanuel.

Vercellana became his mistress and later had two children with him; their first child was conceived when she was only 14.

Their affair caused a great scandal in 1849 when Victor Emmanuel was crowned King of Sardinia. When his Queen died in 1855, the King named Rosa Countess of Mirafiori and Fontanafredda by royal decree in 1858. The King also recognized their two children and assigned them the surname Guerrieri.^{,} In 1860, Victor Emmanuel established her in a new residence in a restored castle of La Mandria, near Venaria.

In 1864, the capital of Italy was moved from Turin to Florence, and Vercellana established herself there in the Villa La Petraia. Five years later, the King fell gravely ill at San Rossore, the royal estate near Pisa. Fearing death, on 18 October 1869, he hurriedly married his mistress in a purely religious ceremony which conferred no civil rights upon his wife. Telegrams to Rome followed, seeking papal benediction.

A civil ceremony was held in Rome eight years later in 1877. This was a morganatic marriage, so she was never made queen and her children had no rights of succession to the throne.

Victor Emmanuel died two months after the ceremony. Rosa Vercellana survived him by eight years, dying on 26 December 1885.

== The mausoleum ==
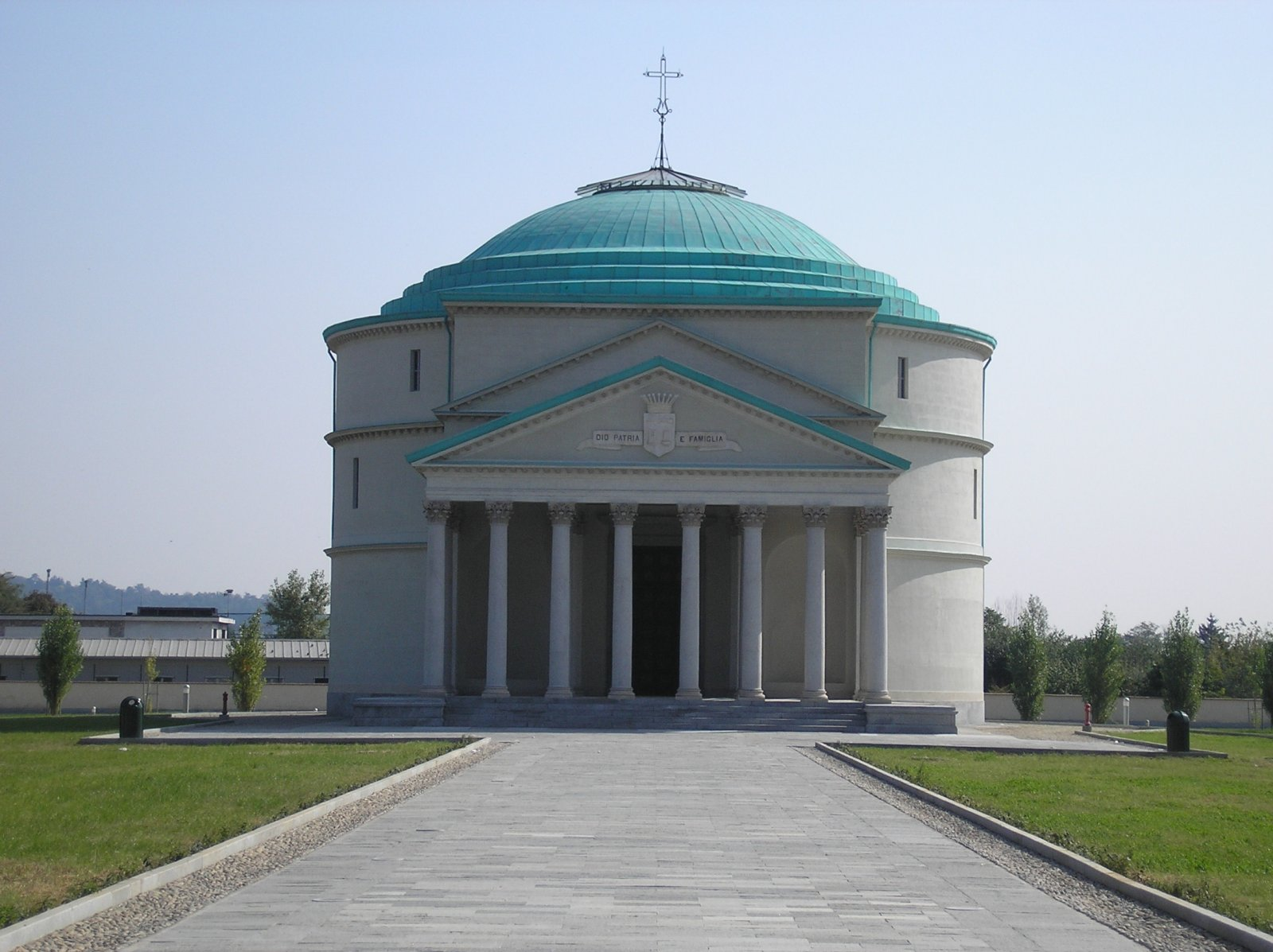
Vercellana's mausoleum in Turin.

As the Savoy family refused to allow Vercellana to be buried next to her husband in the Pantheon, her children had a mausoleum built for her in a similar form (if on a smaller scale) in Turin, next to the road to the Castello di Mirafiori. The circular, copper-domed, neoclassical monument, surmounted by a Latin cross and surrounded by a large park, was designed by Angelo Dimezzi and completed in 1888.

In 1970, it was purchased by the Turin city council from a descendant of Rosa Vercellana for the sum of 132 million lire. The park was opened to the public two years later but almost immediately, the mausoleum was broken into, and the remains of Vercellana and her descendants were mutilated by people searching for jewels. Further acts of vandalism took place over subsequent years, and the structure fell into a state of dereliction. Major restoration work was carried out at the start of the twenty-first century, and the park was reopened to the public in 2005.

== Issue ==
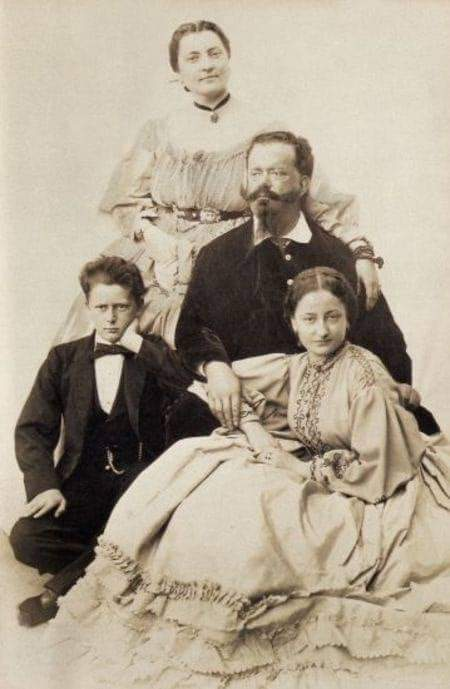
Victor Emmanuel II with Rosa Vercellana and their children

Victor Emmanuel and Rosa Vercellana's children were:

- Vittoria Guerrieri (2 December 1848 – 1905) married Marchese Giacomo Spinola; had issue
- Emanuele Alberto Guerrieri (16 March 1851 – 23 December 1894), Count of Mirafiori and Fontanafredda married Bianca Enrichetta de Laderdel, daughter of Enrico de Laderdel, Count of Montecerboli and Annicie Belfort d'Antry, granddaughter of Federigo De Larderel, great-granddaughter of François Jacques de Larderel.
