= Palazzo Viviani della Robbia, Florence =

Coordinates: 43°46′18.17″N 11°15′4.33″E

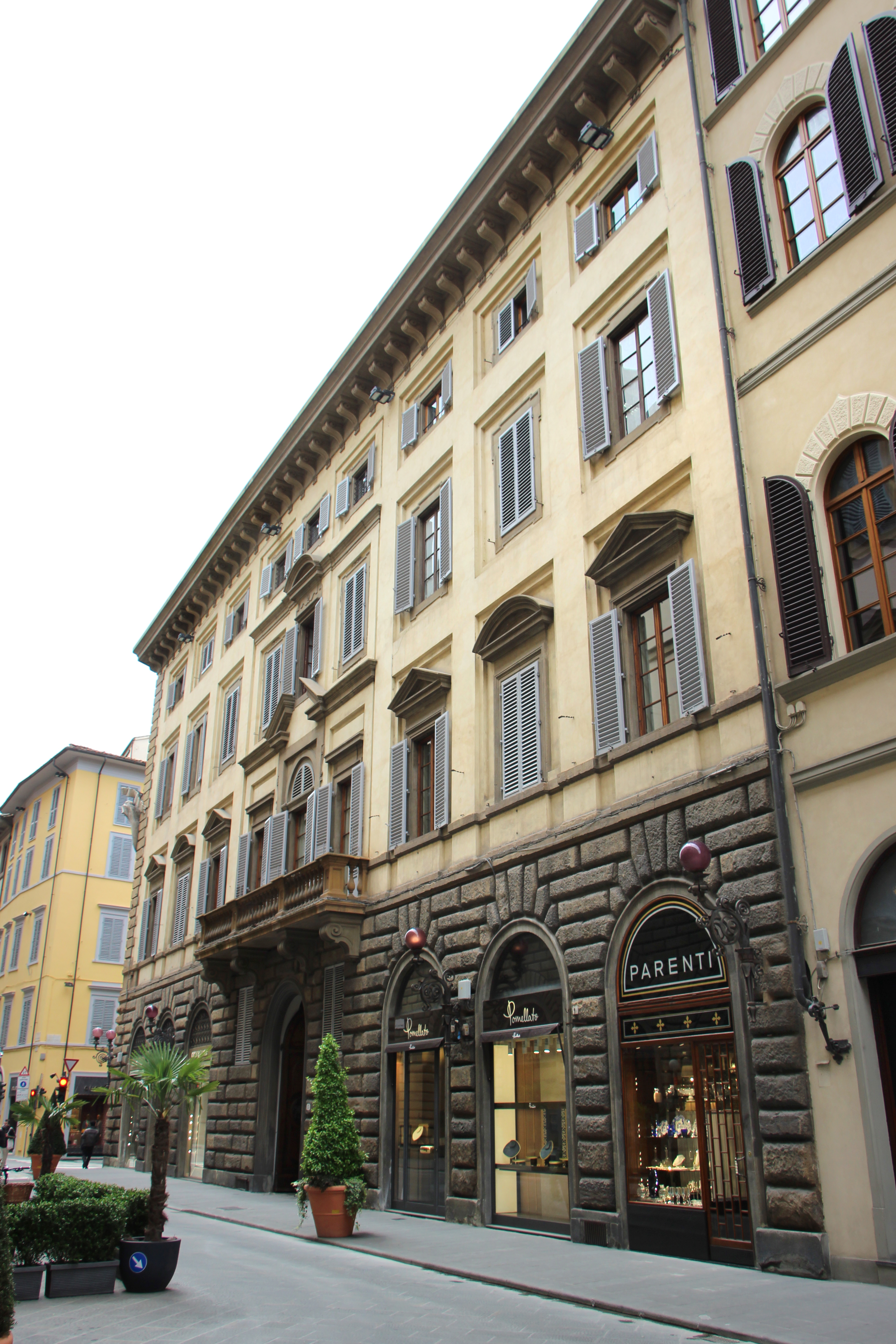
Palazzo Viviani della Robbia, Florence

The Palazzo Viviani della Robbia is a Baroque-style palace located on Via de Tornabuoni #15, corner with Via della Spada, in the quartieri of Santa Maria Novella, city of Florence, region of Tuscany, Italy.

The palace was commissioned by marchese Luigi Viviani, a counselor for Cosimo III de' Medici. It was designed by Giovanni Battista Foggini and completed in 1693.
