= Giovanni Battista Vanni =

Italian painter

Giovanni Battista Vanni, Head of a Young Woman in Profile National Gallery of Denmark, Copenhagen.

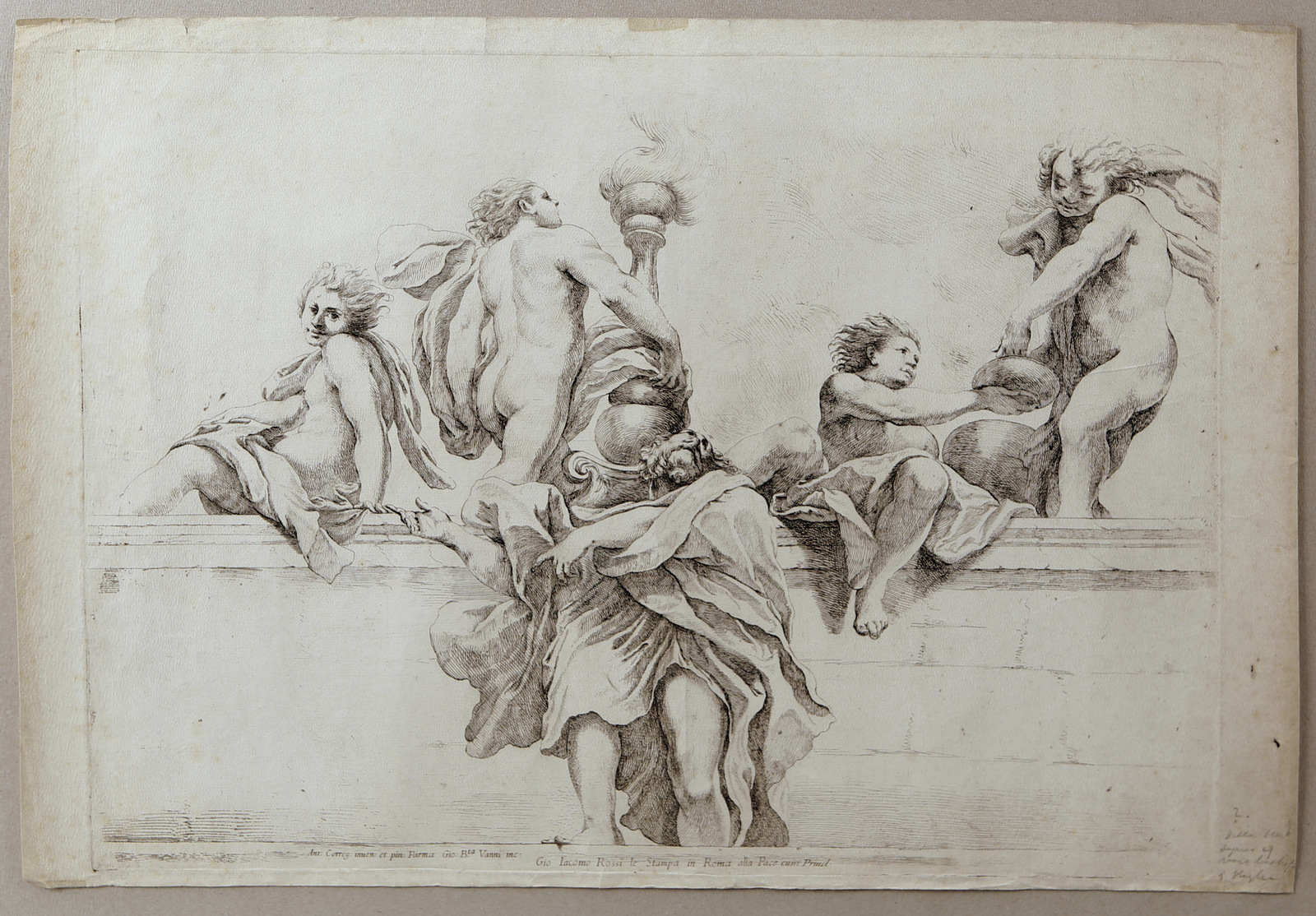
Apostle and four angels: from a set of 15 etchings (1642) by Giovanni Battista Vanni; based on Correggio's fresco in Parma Cathedral

Giovanni Battista Vanni (c. 1599 – 27 July 1660) was an Italian painter and engraver of the Baroque period.

Vanni was born in either Pisa or Florence around 1599; he studied successively under Jacopo da Empoli, Aurelio Lomi, and Matteo Rosselli, and then became a disciple of Cristofano Allori. He is better known as an engraver than as a painter. From 1624 to 1632, he lived in Rome, before returning to Florence after visiting Venice.

In 1642, he etched a series of fifteen plates from Correggio's frescoes from the cupola of Parma Cathedral which depict the Assumption of the Virgin (1526–30). He also engraved Paolo Veronese's Marriage at Cana. His works include a Triumph of David, now in the palace of the Alberti in Prato, an Annunciation for the church of San Francesco di Paola in Florence and a Saint Sebastian Healed at the Feet of the Virgin for the church of San Giovanni dei Fiorentini in Rome. He frescoed a Meal in the house of the Pharisee for a refectory attached to the Church of Santa Maria del Carmine, Florence.

He died at Florence in 1660.

== Sources ==
- Bryan, Michael (1889). Walter Armstrong; Robert Edmund Graves (eds.). Dictionary of Painters and Engravers, Biographical and Critical. Vol. II L-Z. London: George Bell and Sons. p. 633.
