= Smeraldo di Giovanni =

Italian painter

Smeraldo di Giovanni (1365–1444) was an Italian painter of the late-Gothic through early-Renaissance period, active in Florence.

== Biography ==
He worked with Ambrogio Baldese in Orsanmichele in 1402. He is known to have been active in 1420, when he presumably worked in the same studio as Giovanni Dal Ponte (1385- c. 1438; thought to be the same person as Giovanni di Marco). The Scali chapel of Santa Trinita in Florence has a fresco cycle by Giovanni dal Ponte and Smeraldo di Giovanni.
