= Palazzo del Circolo dell'Unione =

Palace in Florence, Italy

Coordinates: 43°46′15.10″N 11°15′4.64″E

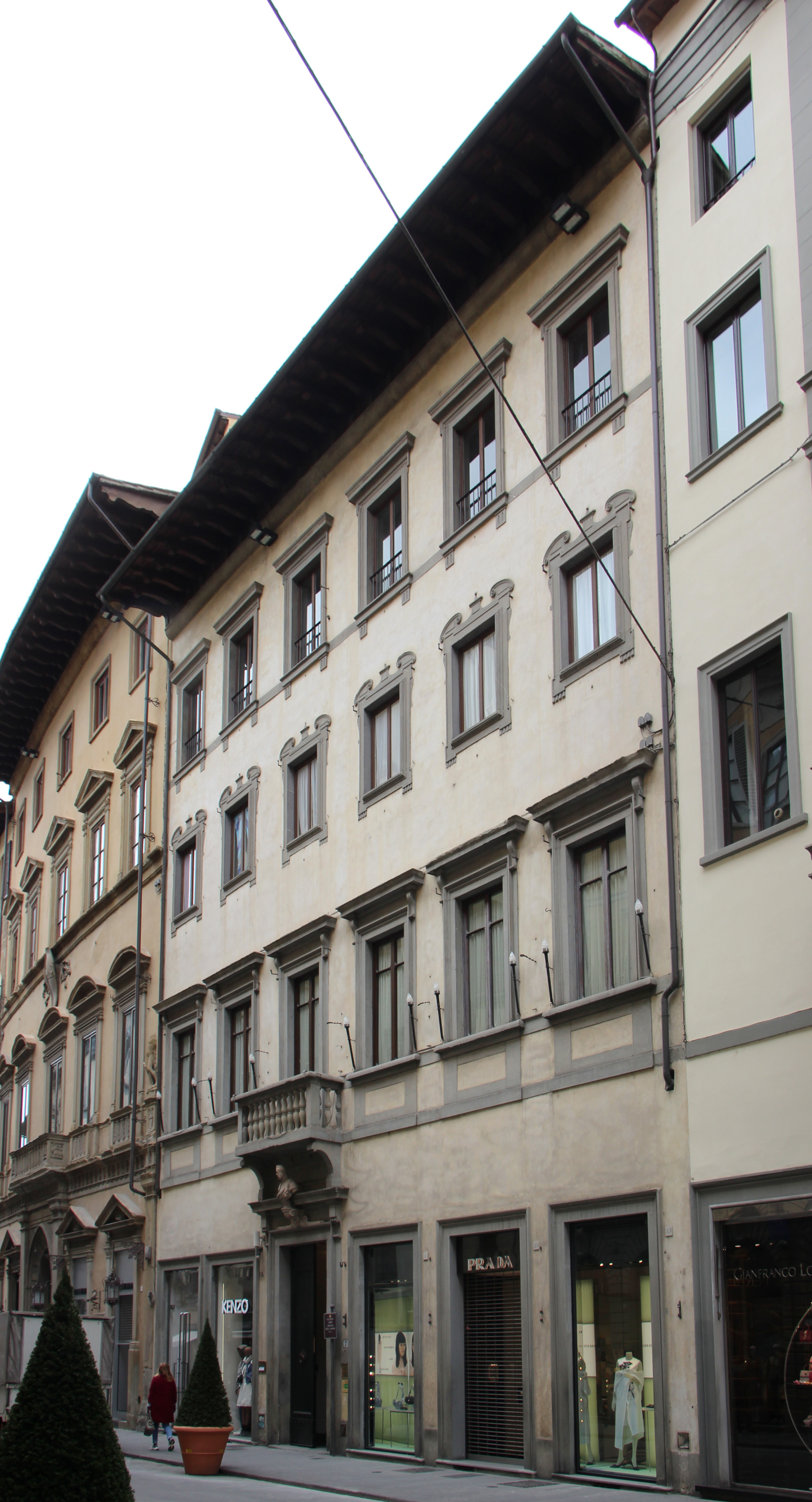
Palazzo del Circolo dell'Unione, in Florence

The Palazzo del Circolo dell'Unione, also once known across the centuries as the Palazzo Corsi, Montauto, or della Commenda da Castiglione, is a late-Renaissance-style palace located on Via Tornabuoni #7 in central Florence, region of Tuscany, Italy. In 2015, it still houses the Circolo society, and houses among other enterprises, a boutique hotel.

== History ==
The property changed hands frequently between the 15th and mid-16th centuries. In 1559, the property, now one palace, was bought for 720 florins by the banker and merchant Simone di Jacopo Corsi, who commissioned a design to which Giorgio Vasari, Giambologna, and Ammannati contributed.

The Corsi owned the palace until 1780, when it became the property of a corporation of Commenda of the Order of St Stephen of Castiglione. In 1790, it passed to Gherardi Uguccioni, who commissioned some refurbishment by Giulio Mannaioni. The building was passed on to two brothers, Marquis of the Barbolani family of Montauto, married to Uguccioni women.

In 1853, the palace became the home of a high-class fraternity/club called the Circolo dell'Unione. The club purchased the building in 1920 and still has offices at the site.

== Art and architecture ==
In the 16th century, the palace was known for it facade fresco decoration by Domenico di Francesco Schiena and Giovanni Fiammingo. The portal is surmounted by a bust of Francesco I de' Medici (1577), attributed to Giambologna. On the vault of the hallway are allegories with the four continents and grotteschi painted by followers of Vasari.

At the end of the 18th century, the salons overlooking the street were decorated by Tommaso Gherardini, Fortini Agostino, Luigi Lorenzi, Pietro della Nave, Giuseppe Nobili and Domenico Fabbroni, but these murals were moved to other properties.

Further interior refurbishments, in an exotic, likely oriental, style, in the Club space occurred in the late 19th century under the guidance of prince Ferdinando Strozzi. Some monochrome frescoes were uncovered in mid-twentieth-century renovations. A chapel in the palace was erected to honor associates fallen in war.
