= Oltrarno =

Quarter of Florence, Italy

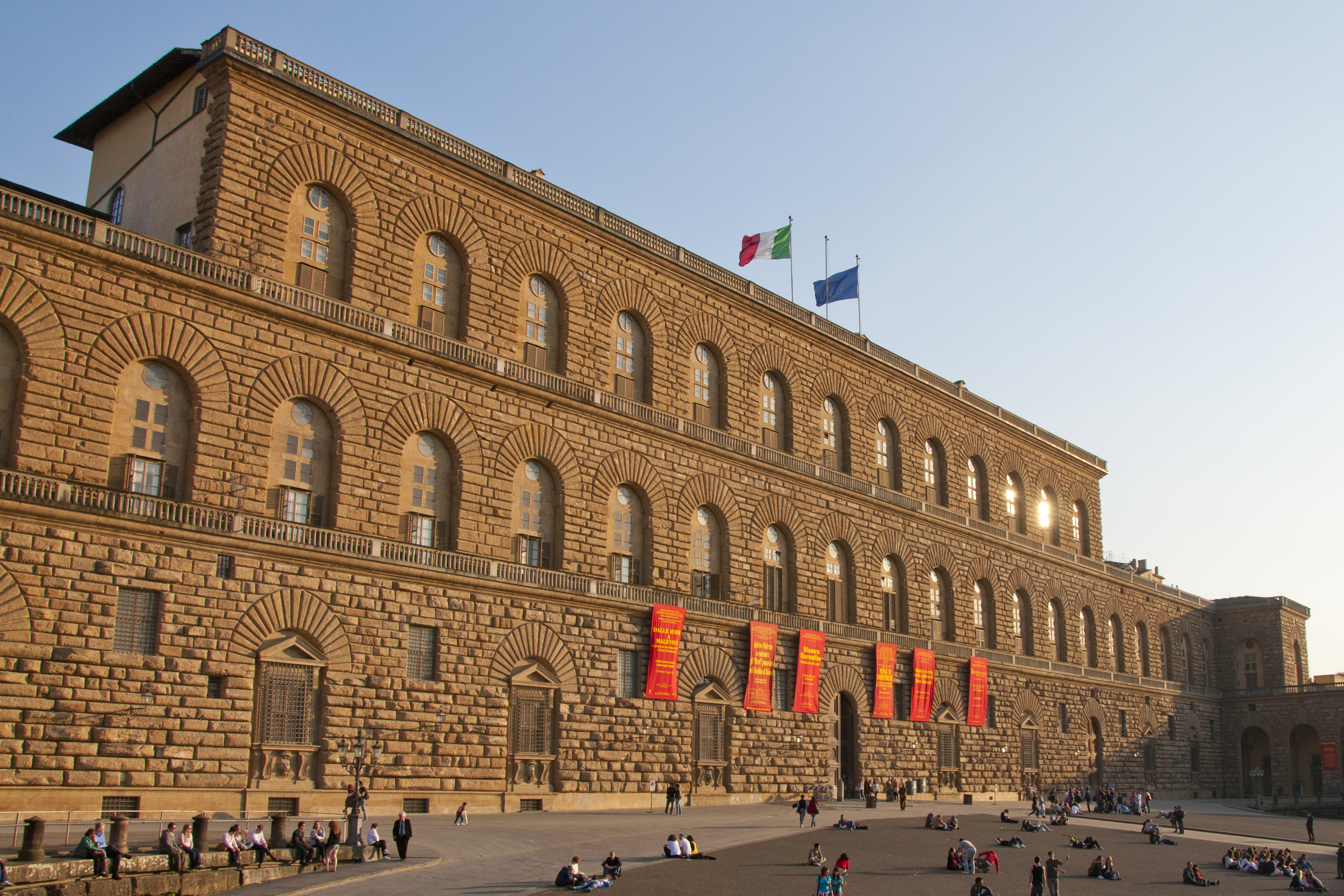
Palazzo Pitti

The Oltrarno ('Beyond the Arno') is a district of Florence, Italy, located south of the river Arno. It contains part of the historic centre of Florence and many notable sites such as the church of Santo Spirito, the Palazzo Pitti, the Belvedere, and Piazzale Michelangelo.

== Gentrification and resistance ==
During recent years, Oltrarno has undergone massive changes due to the arrival of richer social classes - often short term residents - but especially due to the tourist and entertainment industry, which also seeks customers from other areas of Florence.

In November 2011, the urban restoration office of the Municipality of Florence set up a project, not yet put into practice, to turn the former Gasometer - just a few hundred feet from the Oltrarno - into a major private health and beauty spa and restaurant centre, a magnet for the whole city and for tourists.

A few months later, the shopkeepers association Confesercenti launched an initiative called Progetto Oltrarno, in order to open up Oltrarno to mass tourism, like other parts of the town.

In autumn 2012, the district, which has almost no parks, lost the Nidiaci garden and playroom. Formerly the study of the sculptor Emilio Santarelli, in 1923, the Nidiaci was turned into an area for the children of San Frediano and later became the "symbol of social Catholicism in Florence", attended by the pupils and friends of Giorgio La Pira, Fioretta Mazzei and father Danilo Cubattoli ("don Cuba").

The building and a large part of the garden were sold off at an auction to a real estate company which raised a wooden wall to close the inhabitants out, causing demonstrations in the neighbourhood.

What is left of the Nidiaci garden is currently kept open on a volunteer basis by an association of parents and residents.

In May 2012, the company Firenze Parcheggi submitted a feasibility project for building an underground parking lot in the historic Piazza del Carmine, which would replace the 247 places currently available to residents with 201 places (65 to be sold to residents, the rest open to all on a quick turnover basis). The promoters claimed the project was aimed at freeing the surface of the square from cars, but residents saw it as an attempt to drive them out, accompanied as it was by the simultaneous selling off and closure of local health units in Oltrarno, and as a threat to the architectural and hydrogeological stability of monuments of primary importance.

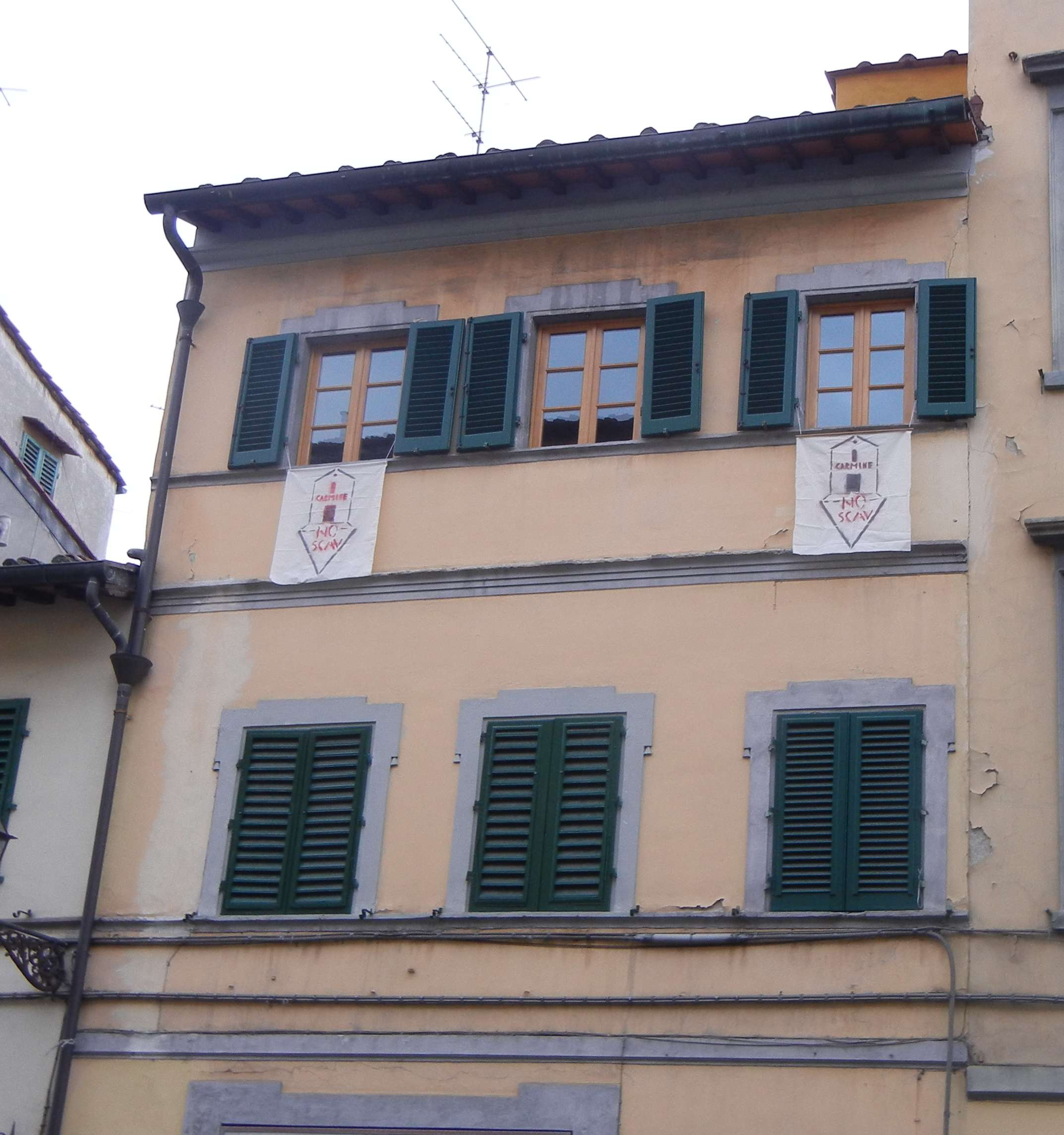
"NoScav" flags in the windows of a building on Piazza Piattellina in San Frediano (2013)

This led to the birth of the "NoScav" ("No Digging") movement, with its typical banners, hung by residents from their windows, depicting a stylized Carmine church and recalling the "NoTav" struggle against a high speed train system elsewhere.

The movement in the Oltrarno gathered around the already existing Comitato Oltrarnofuturo, which united protest against the underground parking lot, the Nidiaci issue, the closure of local health units, the issue of three buildings put up in Via della Chiesa by a construction company which blocked out the view of the back of the Carmine church, the reduction of hours in the schools and the traffic of heavy tourist buses along the narrow Via de' Serragli and Via Romana.

Due to strong resistance by the district, the underground parking lot plan was temporarily suspended by the Municipality, though mayor Matteo Renzi declared himself in favour of the project giving rise to accusations of conflict of interest, since the managing director of Firenze Parcheggi, Marco Carrai, was one of Renzi's main sponsors in the centre-left primary elections in 2012.

== See also ==
- San Francesco di Paola, Florence
