= Palazzo Larderel =

Coordinates: 43°46′20.02″N 11°15′4.61″E

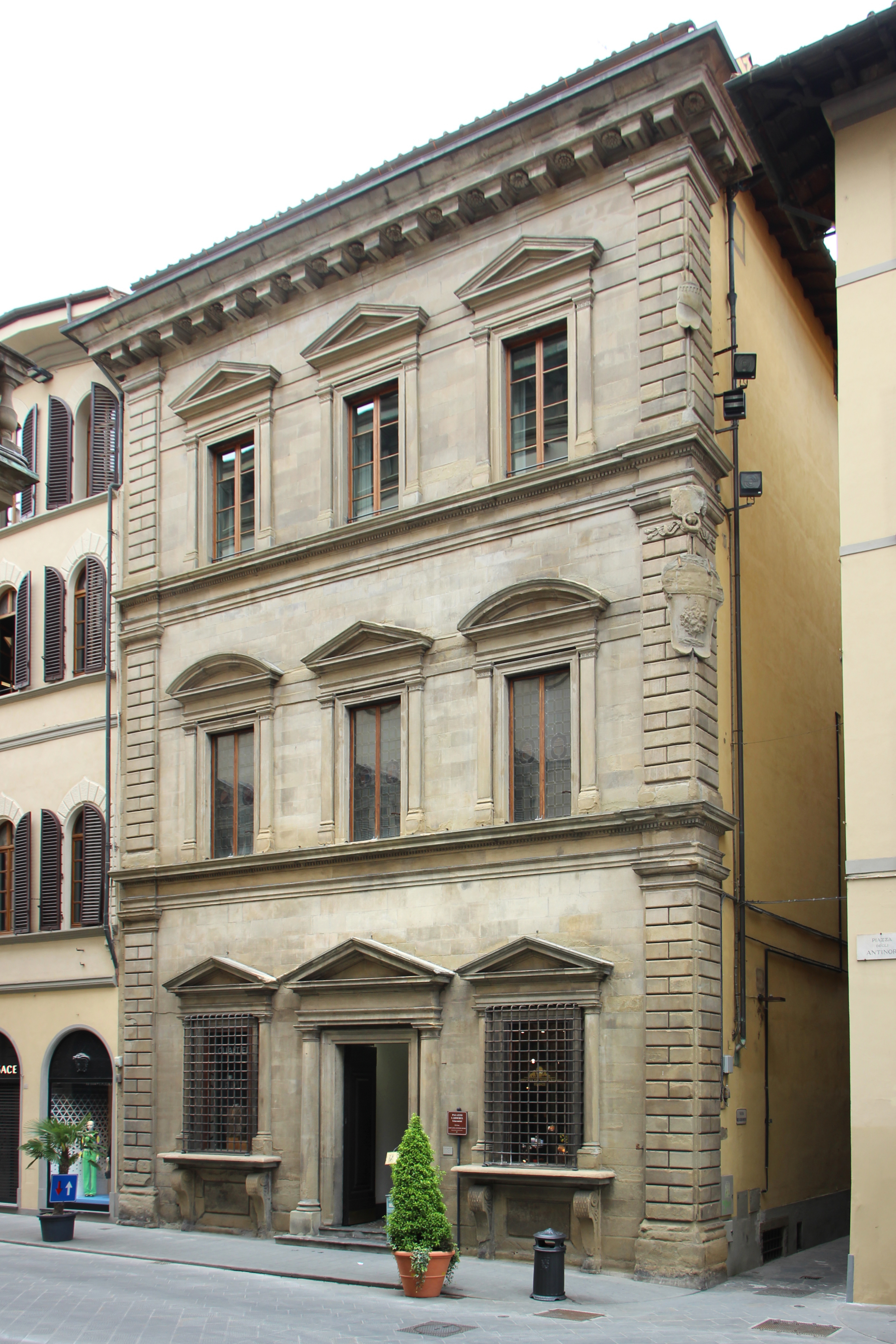
Palazzo Larderel

The Palazzo Larderel, once Tebalducci and Giacomini is a Renaissance-style palace, located on Via de' Tornabuoni number 19, corner via de' Giacomini 1, in the city of Florence, region of Tuscany, Italy.

== History ==
A house at the site was originally built by the descendants of the 13th-century citizen Gherardo Tebalducci, who took the surname Giacomini for their family. They had bought additional lots in 1480 from the Antinori family. The design of the three-story palace was completed in 1580 by Giovanni Antonio Dosio.

The Giacomini had been supporters of the anti-Medici Republic of Florence that lasted from 1527-1529. However, despite the political misfortunes, the family prospered. After last Giacomini owner of the palace died in 1764, the palace passed through diverse owners. In 1839, the palace was bought by Count Francois de Larderel, a French merchant who profited from borax mines at Volterra. Three coats of arms are featured on the corner, Giacomini, Boni, and Larderel. The latter has two ermines and fuming mounds referencing the family trade.
