= Palazzo Minerbetti =

Coordinates: 43.7704°N 11.2512°E

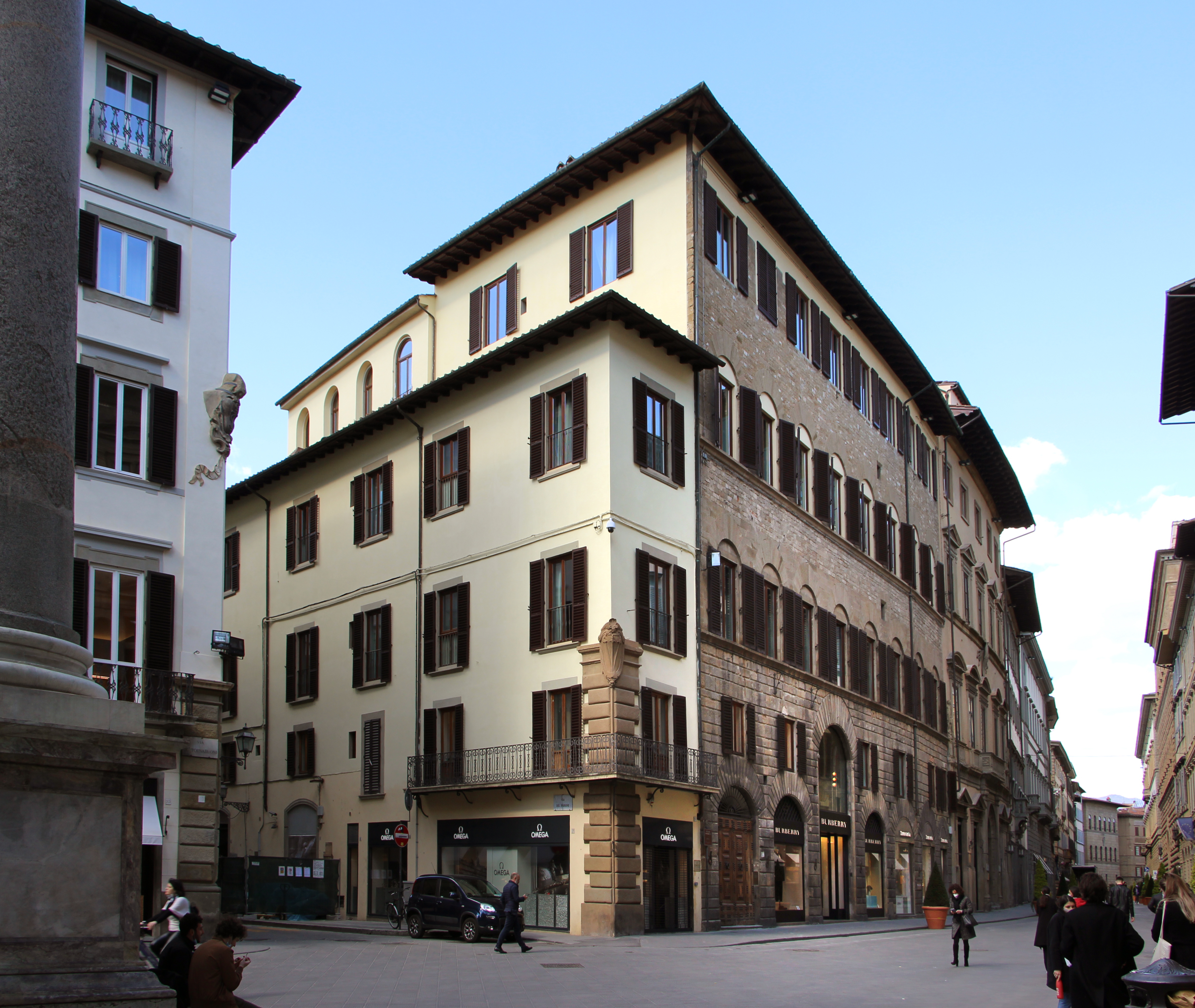
Palazzo Minerbetti

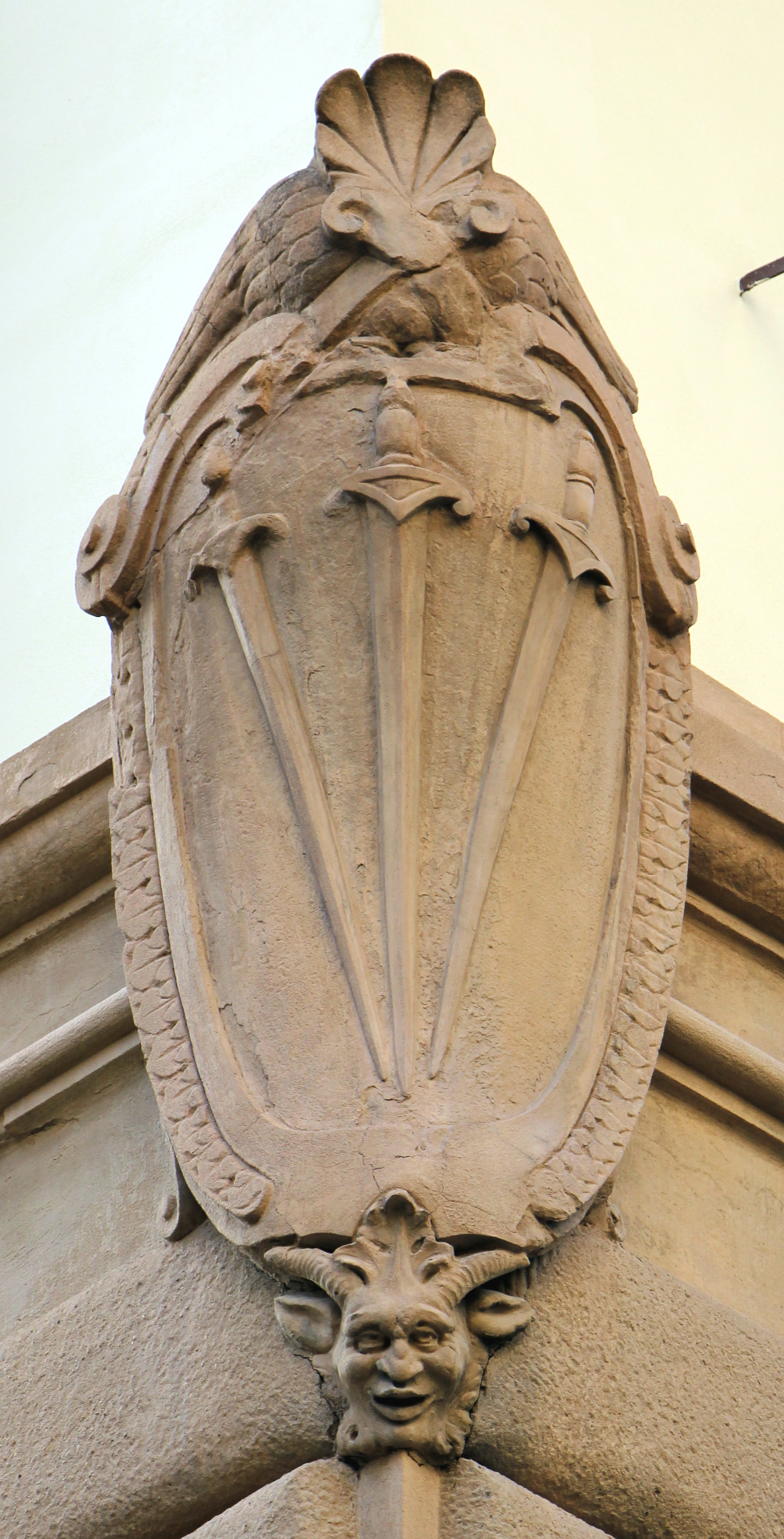
Minerbetti coat of arms

The Palazzo Minerbetti is an urban palace building located on Via de' Tornabuoni #3 at the corner with Via del Parione, which edges into the Piazza Santa Trinita, Florence, in central Florence, Italy.

== History ==
The palace is an assembly of palaces from the 12th and 13th centuries, joined under one family in the 15th century. The corner of the building on Via del Parione has a family heraldic shield.

There are two quoted traditions for the derivation of the Minerbetti, one claims that it derives from a cadet or minor branch of an English Becket family, emigrating prior to the 15th century, perhaps related to the family Saint Thomas Becket of Canterbury, leading to an italianizations of Minor-Becket.

That tradition, however, may be apocryphal; other sources cite this as an ancient republican Florentine family. In 1459, Andrea Minerbetti bought the property from the Bombeni family. The Minerbetti were prominent into the 18th century, hosting the Grand-Duke of Tuscany with pomp in 1767; by the 1800s, the male line had died. The palace was inherited or sold to the Santini family, then the Buovisi Montecatini of Lucca.

An inn was present at the locale since the 19th century; first, one called Locanda del Pellicano and later Locanda d'Europa. The top floors house the pension Tornabuoni Beacci with a rooftop terrace with a view.

== Structure ==
The lower floor of the main façade on Via Tornabuoni has rounded arches and slightly polished stone masonry of varying size. The thin corner building with an iron balcony along Via Parione was completed in the 19th century and connected parts of the palace. Construction of this terrace and a grand staircase was begun in 1730. In 1761, a chapel was added by Pier Giovanni Fabbroni; was decorated with frescoes and had an altarpiece of Martyrdom of San Tommaso (Thomas Becket) by Giacinto Fabbroni.
