= Santa Trinita =

Church in Florence, Italy

Coordinates: 43.770153°N 11.250719°E

- Basilica di Santa Trinita
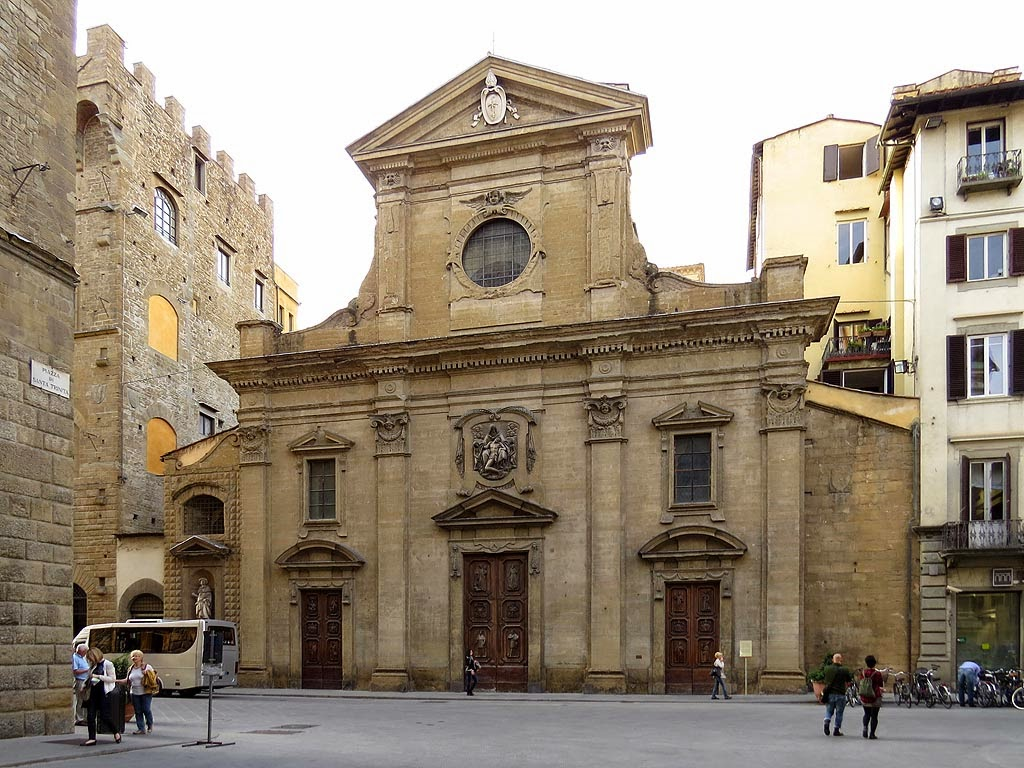
- Façade
- Santa Trinita
- Location: Florence
- Country: ITA
- Religious order: Vallumbrosan Order
- Churchmanship: Catholic Church of Roman Rite
- Website: www.monaci.org/monastero-santa-trinita/

History
- Founded: 1250

Santa Trinita (pronounced [ˈsanta ˈtriːnita]; Italian for "Holy Trinity") is a Roman Catholic church located in front of the piazza of the same name, traversed by Via de' Tornabuoni, in central Florence, Tuscany, Italy. It is the mother church of the Vallumbrosan Order of Monks, founded in 1092 by a Florentine nobleman. South on Via de' Tornabuoni is the Ponte Santa Trinita over the river Arno; across the street is the Palazzo Spini Feroni.

== History ==
The church was founded by the Vallombrosians in the 11th century (when it was outside the city walls), and subsequently patronized by many of Florence's wealthiest families. Even though the modern Italian word for "trinity" is trinità, with an accent indicating stress on the last vowel, the old Florentine pronunciation used to put the stress on the first vowel, and the name is therefore written without an accent; sometimes, it is accented as trìnita to indicate the unusual pronunciation.

Santa Trinita was originally built as a simple Romanesque style, named the Church of Santa Maria dello Spasimo. It was built on the site of an earlier Carolingian oratory. Some traces are still visible on the counter-facade. The current church was constructed in 1258–1280 at the site of a pre-existing 11th-century church. It was raised to the rank of minor basilica in the 13th century. Santa Trinita is both a parish church and the monastic church of the Vallombrosan monastery of the same name.

Multiple reconstructions occurred over the centuries. The Mannerist façade (1593–1594) was designed by Bernardo Buontalenti. The bas-relief over the central door of the trinity was sculpted by Pietro Bernini and Giovanni Battista Caccini. The 17th-century wooden doors have carved panels depicting Saints of the Vallumbrosan order. The Column of Justice (Colonna di Giustizia) in the piazza outside, originates from the Baths of Caracalla in Rome, and was a gift to Cosimo I de' Medici by Pope Pius IV. It was erected in 1565 to commemorate the Battle of Montemurlo in which Florence defeated Siena.

The Santa Trinita Maestà by Cimabue was once at the high altar of the church, and was later moved to a side chapel. It is now exhibited at the Uffizi.

The former Strozzi Chapel is now the sacristy.

== Chapels ==
The church has approximately 20 chapels, many with masterworks. The most significant are the Sassetti and the Bartolini Salimbeni chapels. Francesco Sassetti had been a manager of the Medici Bank, and some of the Ghirlandaio frescoes capture views of contemporary Florence.

Side	Chapel #	Chapel name and artworks
R	1 (nave near facade)	Gianfigliazzi chapel: remodeled circa 1630 by Gherardo Silvani contains a 14th-century crucifix (Crocifisso della Providenza) and a fresco of St Mary of Egypt & St Zosimus (c. 1400).
R	2	Davizzi chapel: remodeled c. 1642 by Matteo Nigetti.
R	3	Cialli-Sernigi chapel: contains a Madonna with Saints by Neri di Bicci and unfinished detached murals of Mystic marriage of St Catherine by a follower of Spinello Aretino.
R	4	Bartolini Salimbeni Chapel: houses frescoes of Life of the Virgin (1420s) by Lorenzo Monaco and assistants. The impressive Annunciation altarpiece is also by Lorenzo Monaco.
R	5	Ardinghelli chapel: contains a 15th-century Man of Sorrows and a tabernacle (1505–15) by Benedetto da Rovezzano.
R	6 (far wall after transept exit)	Sassetti Chapel: a landmark in Florence, the chapel has frescoes of Life of St Francis and Prophecies of Christ’s Birth (1482–1485), as well as an altarpiece of Adoration of the Shepherds (1485), all painted by Domenico Ghirlandaio. Over the entrance is a scene of the Sybil informing emperor Augustus of the coming of Christ. One panel depicts the Miracle of St Francis in resuscitating a boy who had fallen from Palazzo Spini, which occurred across the street. The Francis Receiving the Order from Pope Honorius is now housed in the Piazza della Signoria.
R	7 (far wall)	Doni chapel: decorated between 1608 and 1640 by Ludovico Cigoli.
	8	The center chancel hold an altarpiece by Mariotto di Nardo depicting the Trinity (1406).
L	1 (nave)	Strozzi chapel: rebuilt by Giovanni Battista Caccini and contains damaged murals by Bernardino Poccetti. The altarpiece is now in the Uffizi. Fra Angelico's Deposition, begun by Lorenzo Monaco for the chapel, is now at the National Museum of San Marco.
L	2	Bombeni chapel: remodeled by Nigetti, and holds Mystic marriage of St Catherine of Siena by Antonio del Ceraiolo and St Jerome and Annunciation by Ridolfo Ghirlandaio.
L	3	Davanzati chapel: contains an Annunciation (c. 1450–60) by Neri di Bicci and a mural of Disputation of St. Catherine by a follower of Maso di Banco.
L	4	Compagni chapel: has a Coronation of Virgin (c. 1400) and a San Giovanni Gualbert and Vallombrossan saints (1455) painted by Neri di Bicci.
L	5 (transept)	Spini chapel: houses a Magdalen by Desiderio da Settignano and finished by Benedetto da Maiano.
L	6 (transept)	Chapel of Madonna dello Spasimo has a Christ of the road to calvary by school of Cosimo Rosselli.
L	7 (transept)	Chapel of San Giovanni Gualberto was designed by Caccini.
L	8 (transept)	The Chapel contains a Trinity adored by Saints Catherine & Mary Magdalen (c. 1485) painted by Francesco Granacci.
L	9 (far wall)	The Scali chapel has a fresco cycle by Giovanni dal Ponte and Smeraldo di Giovanni. The tomb of the bishop Benozzo Federighi was completed by Luca della Robbia, and moved to this church in 1895 from San Francesco di Paola.
L	10 (far wall)	Usimbardi chapel: rebuilt by Cigoli in 1602.
