= Giovanni Antonio Dosio =

Italian architect and sculptor (1533–1611)

Giovanni Antonio Dosio (1533–1611) was an Italian architect and sculptor.

== Biography ==
Dosio was born in San Gimignano. A student of Ammanati, with whom he realized the Villa dell'Ambrogiana, Dosio worked primarily in Rome (1548–75) and Florence (1575–89), with some commissions that took him to Naples.

During his early years in Rome, where he arrived at the age of fifteen, Dosio produced numerous drawings of the ancient and modern city, and developed a reputation as an antiquary while he was still a young man. He worked in the atelier of Raffaello da Montelupo until 1551. His first important Roman commission was the tomb for his friend, the humanist poet Annibale Caro, in 1567; in the interim, he scratched out a miserable living doing restorations of fragments of Roman sculpture. In 1562 he was carrying out an excavation on behalf of the papal condottiere Torquato Conti, who had extensive contacts among humanist and antiquarian circles in Rome and knew Dosio's good friend Annibale Caro. Dosio was uncovering the fragments of the marble map of Rome made for Septimius Severus, the Forma Urbis Romae from a site near the Church of SS Cosma e Damiano. Torquato Conti had leased the excavation site from the canons of the church. Conti presented the precious fragments to his relative Cardinal Alessandro Farnese. Conti then sent Dosio to his castello at Poli, where Dosio executed the stucco friezes that may still be seen there in the ground-floor apartments.

In 1564 a papal courier found Dosio in the Umbrian hilltown of Amelia, working on a funeral monument for a local bishop, Bartolomeo Farrattino. Immediately thereafter Dosio left to oversee the rebuilding of fortifications at Anagni, his first work as an architect, which was interrupted in 1565 with the death of Pope Pius IV; of this work, two of the rusticated portals remain, the Porta S. Maria, and the Porta S. Francesco. The overall design of the fortifications was doubtless due to Pius's cousin, Gabrio Serbelloni, and the military governor, Torquato Conti, to whom Dosio owed the commission.

His years in Florence are best known in part because his sole contemporary biographer, Raffaello Borghini, was Florentine himself, and described Dosio's work in Florence most fully. His Florentine years coincided with his full maturity as an architect, and the commissions were for projects that were grander than his Roman work.

He was the author of Urbis aedificiorum illustrium quae supersunt reliquiae (1569). Giovanni Battista Caccini was his pupil.

His place in the history of the period, according to modern art scholar Carolyn Valone (1976) is of the "second rank".

From 1590 he worked for almost twenty years in Naples, where the Viceroy bestowed on him the prestigious appointment of “royal architect”. In Naples he realized the cloister of the San Martino Charterhouse, worked on a draft for the Girolamini church, while in the Cathedral of Naples he realized the Brancaccio Chapel (1598). From 1600 He worked in Caserta for the Prince of Caserta Andrea Matteo Acquaviva D’Aragona. He died in Caserta.

== Main works ==
- Figure of Hope on the tomb of Giulio del Vecchio, Rome, ca. 1556 (demolished)
- Wall monument for Bartolomeo Farrattino, Amelia, c. 1559/62–64.
- Portals and city walls, Anagni, 1564–66.
- Palazzo Conti (now Palazzo Pubblico), Pola, for Torquato Conti; stucco friezes
- Tombs of Annibale Caro (1567) and Giovanni Pacini in the church of San Lorenzo in Damaso, Rome;
- Tomb of Antonio Massa da Gallese in San Pietro in Montorio, Rome
- Tomb of the marchese di Saluzzo in Santa Maria in Aracoeli, Rome
- Church of Girolamini, Naples
- interiors of the Certosa di San Martino, Naples.
- Gaddi Chapel in Santa Maria Novella, Florence (1575–77); Michelangelesque
- Villa di Bellosguardo, Florence
- Palazzo Giacomini Larderel, in via Tornabuoni, Florence;
- Niccolini Chapel in Santa Croce, Florence (begun in 1582), with revetment of polychrome marbles.
- The Archbishop's Palace, Florence; it was modified in the 19th century.
- Palazzo del Boschetto, Caserta
