= Column of Justice, Florence =

Doric column in Florence, Italy

Column of Justice (Colonna della Giustizia or di Santa Trinita or della Battaglia di Montemurlo) is an ancient Roman granite Doric column re-erected by the Florentine Medici dynasty in the Renaissance as a free-standing victory monument with a porphyry statue of Justice at the top. It stands in the Piazza Santa Trinita, in central Florence, Italy.

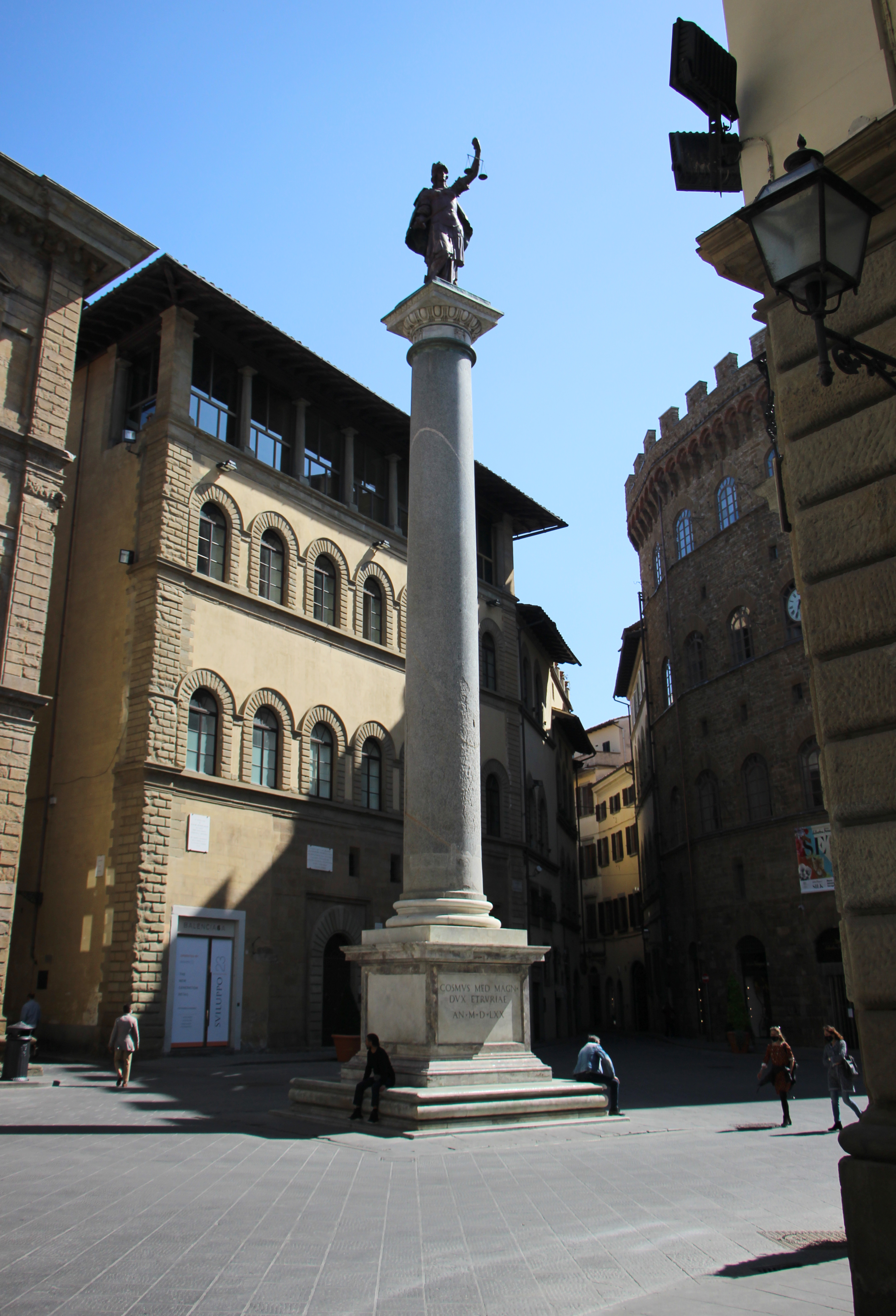
Column in Piazza Santa Trinita

== History ==
The column was originally installed in the Baths of Caracalla in Rome and was given by Pope Pius IV to Cosimo I de Medici. The transportation of the 50-ton, 11 meter long granite column from Rome to Florence was an immense challenge.

It took months to move the column from the ruins of the Baths to the port on the Tiber, travelling about hundred meters per day. Part of the transportation was supervised by Giorgio Vasari, who had been sent by the Duke to Rome. It was then embarked at Ostia and taken by sea to the lower stretches of the Arno. A special barge appears to have been towed by a galley. This convoy was threatened along the route by Saracen raiders. Arriving in Tuscany, it had to be carried overland by oxen and horse-drawn carts to Florence. The move from the river bank a few miles upriver from Pisa to Florence took nearly a year, arriving in 1563, and was supervised by Bartolommeo Ammannati.

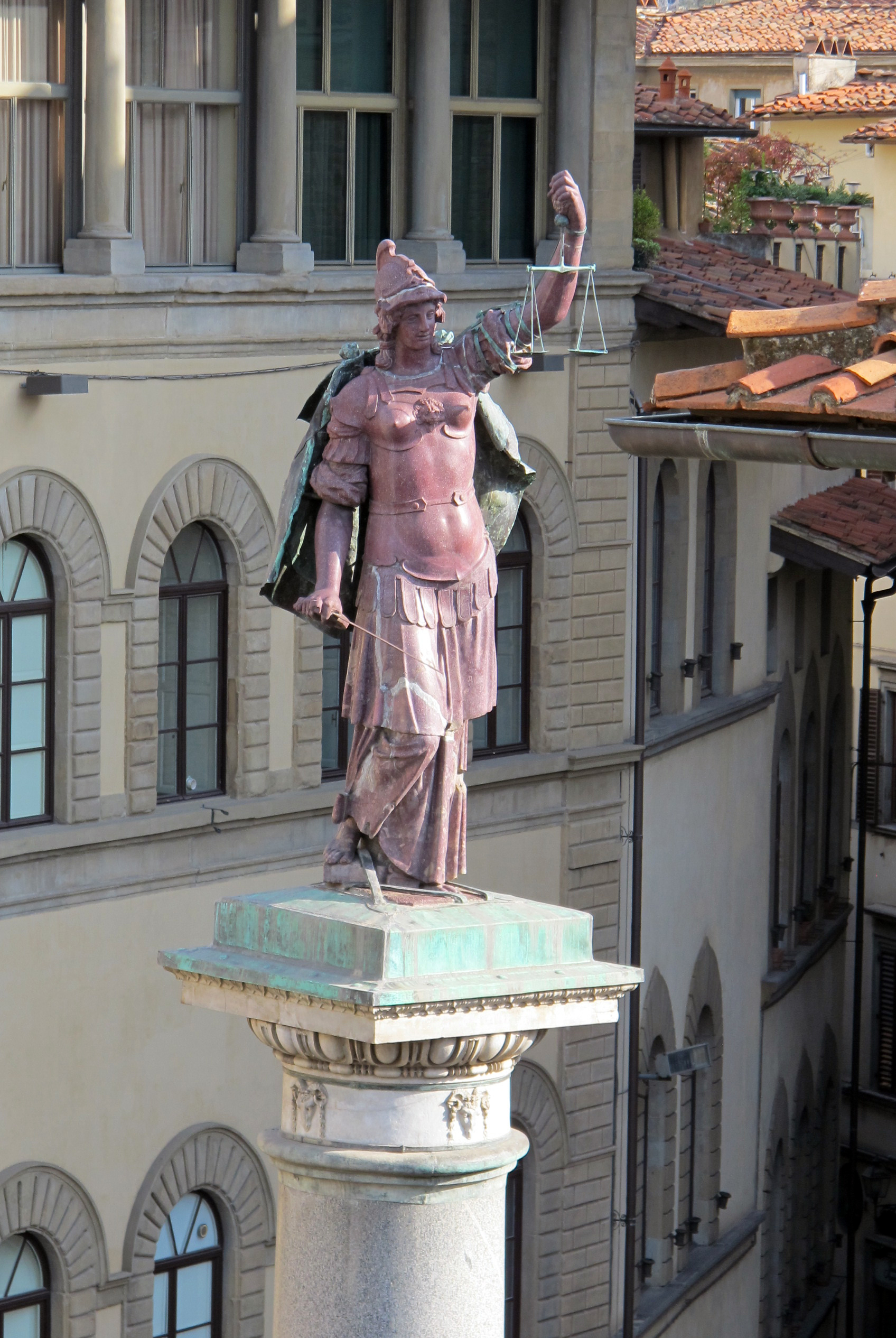
Pink porphyry statue of Justice

The column was erected on its pedestal in 1565. Contemporary documents state it took only two hours to erect the column. A temporary wood statue, depicting Justice was erected at the summit. This was replaced in 1580 by a purple porphyry statue of Justice designed by Ammannati, made from three fragments of ancient Roman sculpture in porfido rosso antico and clamped together with bronze. Since porphyry is one of the hardest stones to carve, it took the artisan Francesco del Tadda (Ferrucci) and his son Romolo nearly 11 years to complete the statue.

The dedication of this column, erected by Cosimo I de'Medici, changed over time. Cosimo intended first to celebrate his 1537 victory over Siena in the Battle of Montemurlo (others cite the Battle of Marciano). This was apt because he had been here when he was informed of the victory of his troops over the rebellious Pietro Strozzi and his Sienese allies. In 1569, Pope Pius V had granted Cosimo the title of Grand Duke of Tuscany and the dedication was made to Justice with the present inscription.
