= Via de' Tornabuoni =

Street at the center of Florence, Italy

Coordinates: 43°46′15″N 11°15′05″E

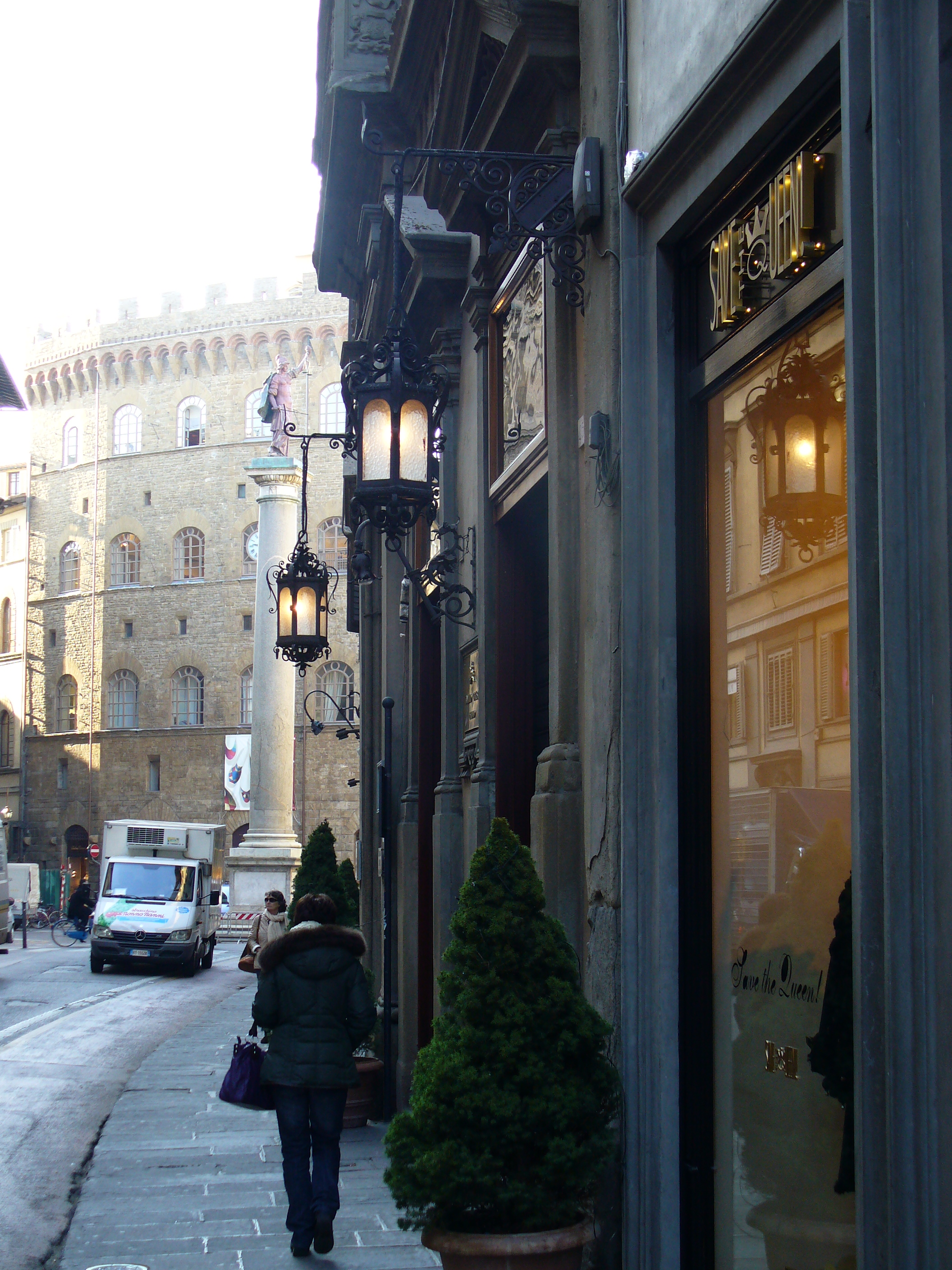
View of Via de' Tornabuoni

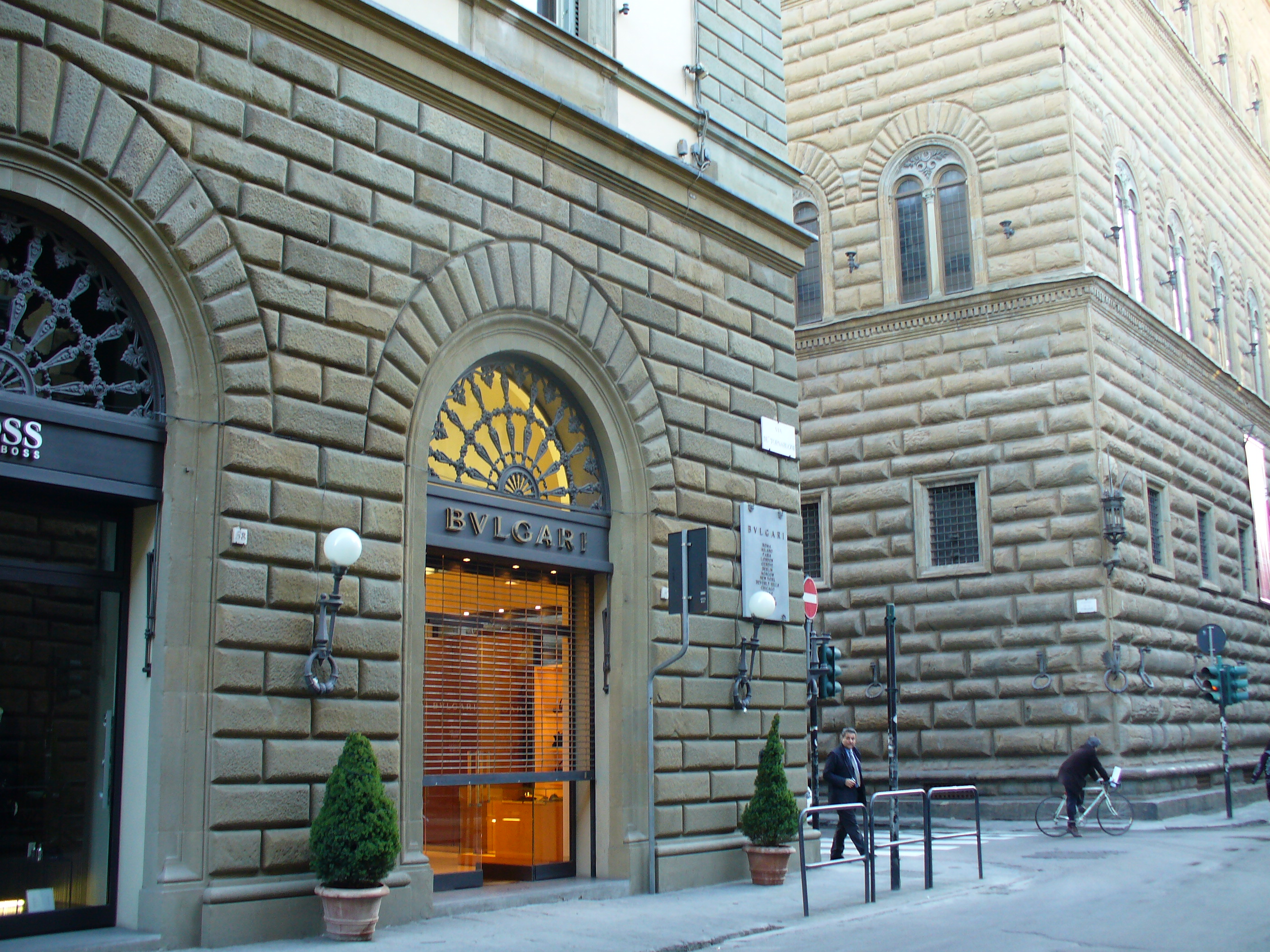
Via de' Tornabuoni with Palazzo Strozzi

Via de' Tornabuoni, or Via Tornabuoni, is a street at the center of Florence, Italy, that goes from Antinori square to Ponte Santa Trinita, across Santa Trinita square, distinguished by the presence of fashion boutiques.

The street houses high fashion boutiques, belonging to designer brands such as Gucci, Salvatore Ferragamo, Enrico Coveri, Roberto Cavalli, Emilio Pucci and others; also boutiques of jewelry are here such as Damiani, Bulgari and Buccellati.

== History ==
The road was once crossed by the city's Roman walls; in the early Middle Ages, it ran along the Mugnone River. Near the current Palazzo Strozzi was the Brancazio Gate. With the 12th century enlargement of the walls, the stream was diverted and the road widened. At the time, it had different names, including Via Larga dei Legnaiuoli and Via dei Belli Sporti.

After the creation of the Grand Duchy of Tuscany in the 16th century, via de' Tornabuoni was the seat of the processions from Palazzo Pitti to via Maggio and Ponte Santa Trinita, as well as pallone col bracciale matches, calcio storico fiorentino games and horse races. In 1565 it received a porphyry column which still characterizes it.

Via de' Tornabuoni once housed the Casoni Cafè, where, in 1920, the Negroni cocktail was invented by Camillo Negroni.

== Buildings ==
Historical buildings on Via Tornabuoni include:

East side starting from Arno:

- Palazzo Spini Feroni, 14th century, site of Salvatore Ferragamo Museum
- Palazzo Minerbetti on Santa Trinita square, 14th century
- Palazzo Buondelmonti (in Santa Trinita square), 15th century
- Palazzo Bartolini Salimbeni (in Santa Trinita square), designed by Baccio d'Agnolo and built in 1517–1520 in late-Renaissance style
- Palazzo Medici Tornaquinci, 15th century
- Palazzo Altoviti Sangalletti, it was the host of Caffé Doney since 19th century
- Palazzo Gherardi Uguccioni or Alamanni
- Palazzo Strozzi (1489–1534)
- Palazzo Tornabuoni, a large palace built in the 16th century

West side starting from Arno:

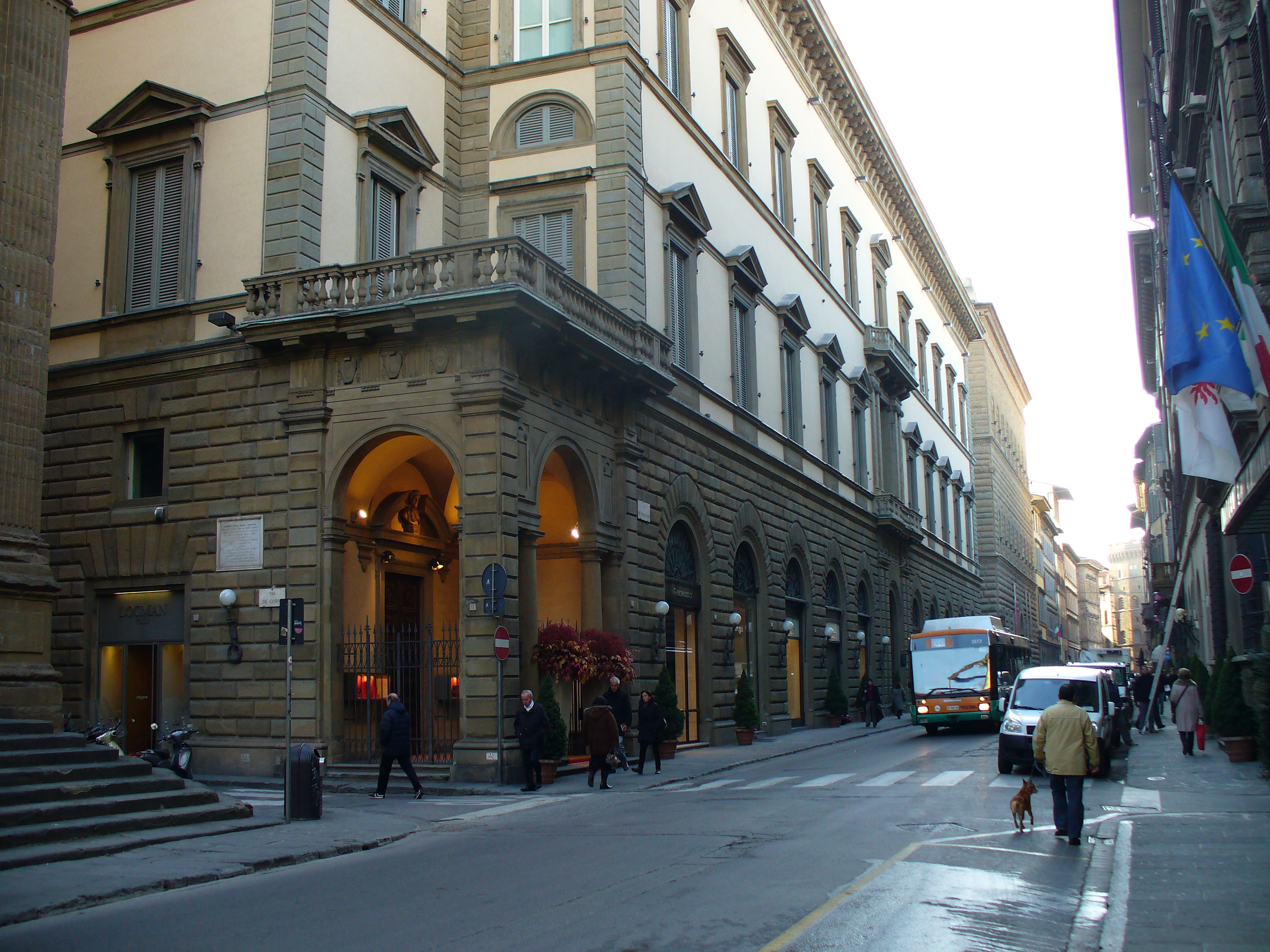
The Street

- One of the palazzi dei Gianfigliazzi, Lungarno Corsini corner
- Torre dei Gianfigliazzi, 13th century
- Basilica di Santa Trinita
- Palazzo Minerbetti
- Palazzo Strozzi del Poeta (or Giaconi)
- Palazzo del Circolo dell'Unione (or Corsi and della Commenda da Castiglione), built in 1559 under design by Vasari
- Palazzo Dudley
- Palazzo Viviani della Robbia, by Giovan Battista Foggini
- Palazzetto Tornabuoni
- Palazzo Larderel, or Palazzo Giacomini, by Giovanni Dosio

In Piazza degli Antinori ("Antinori square"), adjacent to the northern terminus of Via Tornabuoni, are the following buildings:

- Palazzo Antinori, built between 1461 and 1469, and designed by Giuliano da Maiano
- Chiesa dei Santi Michele e Gaetano (Church of Saints Michael and Gaetano), a masterpiece of Florentine Baroque architecture (a much more detailed presentation of this church, including photographs, is available on an Italian language Wikipedia page titled Chiesa dei Santi Michele e Gaetano).

== Sources ==
- Maffei, Gianluigi (1995). Via Tornabuoni, il salotto di Firenze (in Italian). Florence: Loggia dei Lanzi editori. ISBN 88-8105-056-0.
