= Giovanni Battista Caccini =

Italian sculptor

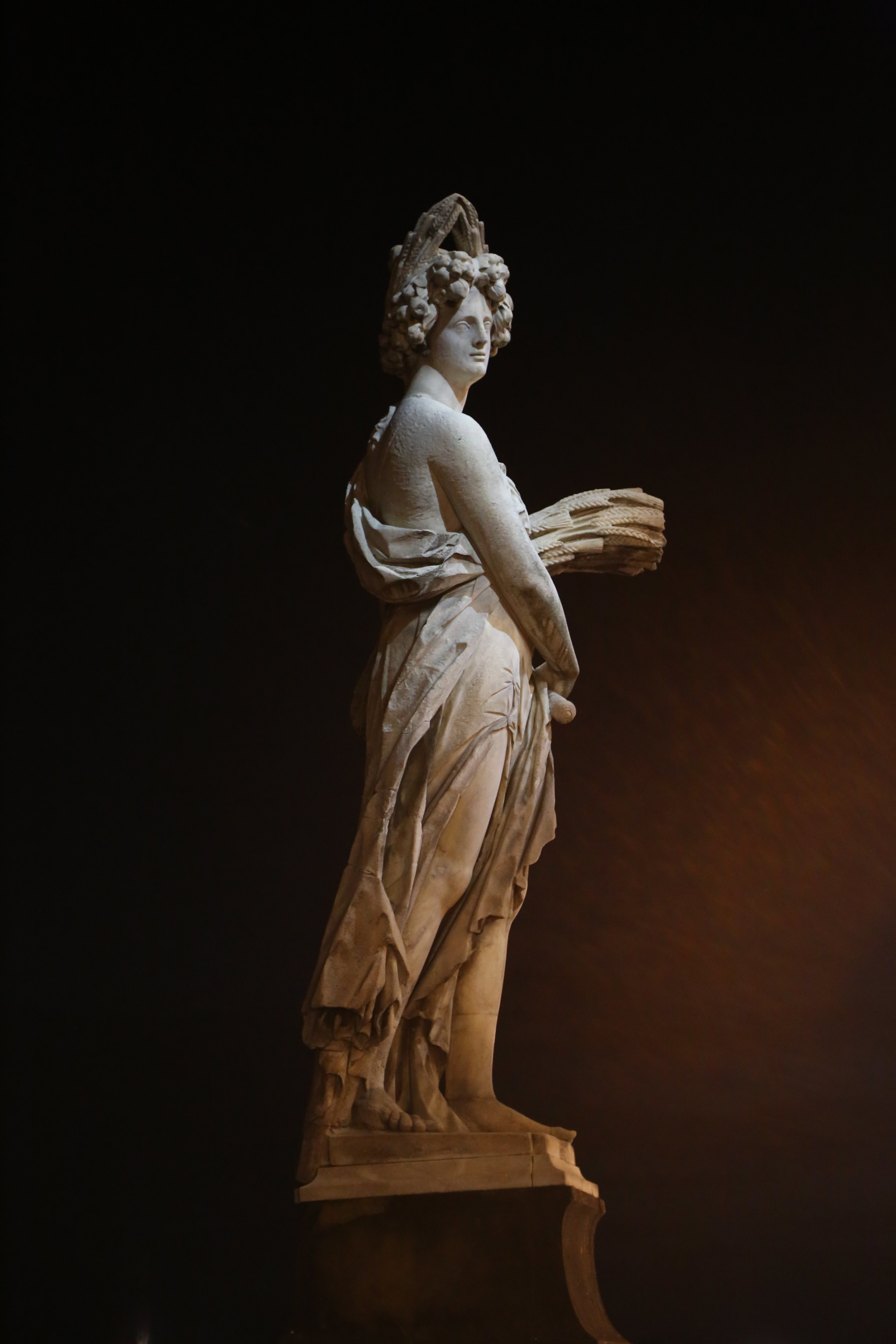
Summer

Giovanni Battista Caccini or Giovan Battista Caccini (24 October 1556 – 13 March 1613) was an Italian sculptor from Florence, who worked in a classicising style in the later phase of Mannerism.

== Life ==
Giovanni Battista Caccini was born at Montopoli in Val d'Arno between Florence and Pisa; his training was with the sculptor-architect Giovanni Antonio Dosio, known for his accurate drawings of Roman antiquities, and Caccini's numerous interpretive restorations of Roman sculptural fragments gave him the reputation of being a knowledgeable antiquarian, while the inescapable influence of Giambologna and his circle can be seen in Caccini's bronze statuettes. Caccini was in close cooperation with Pietro Tacca and the rest of Giambologna's pupils in the prolonged cooperation over the bronze doors for Pisa Cathedral.

Fragmentary antiquities were not to the sixteenth-century collectors' taste. Caccini produced a head for an antique torso, and a further, crouching figure to produce the Bacchus and Ampelos in the Uffizi, which was once attributed to Michelangelo. He restored a fragmentary Apollo Sauroctonos as an Apollo with the Lyre (Uffizi). He could also improvise on antique themes: the biographer of artists Rafaello Borghini reported in 1730 that "In truth he was highly skilled in diligently putting together pieces, and counterfeiting, the Antique."

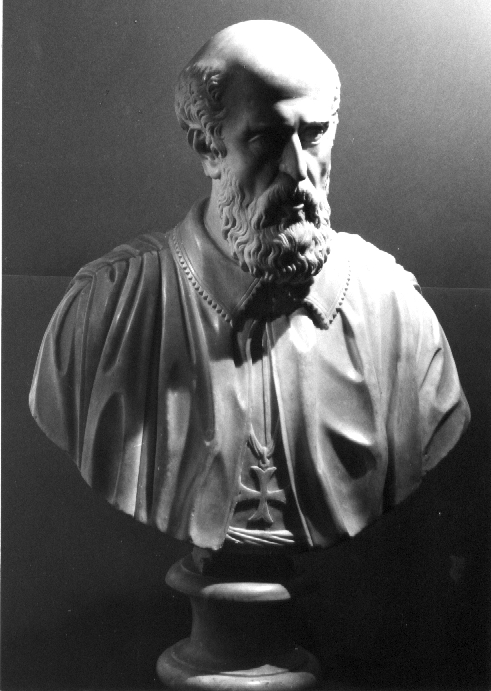
Bust of Baccio Valori

His garden sculptures produced the bold silhouettes and copious attributes that the genre requires. As an architect, his one notable work is the portico of the Santissima Annunziata, Florence (1601). Caccini died in Rome in 1613.

His brother, Giulio Caccini, was a famous composer, teacher, singer, instrumentalist and writer of the very late Renaissance and early Baroque eras.

== Selected works ==
- Figure of S. Giovanni Gualberto, Badia di Passignano, Val di Pesa, 1580
- Bust of Christ, c. 1595 (Rijksmuseum)
- Temperance, 1583 (Metropolitan Museum of Art)
- Charles V crowned by Clement VII, Salone del Cinquecento, Palazzo Vecchio, Florence.
- Ciborium in Santo Spirito, Florence.
- Among his numerous allegorical statues in the Boboli Gardens, Florence:
  - Seasons, four figures in the Boboli Gardens, Florence
  - Youthful Jupiter (attributed), Boboli Gardens.
- Seasons, two of the figures for the Ponte Santa Trinita, Florence
