= Palazzo Spini Feroni =

Gothic palace in Florence

Coordinates: 43°46′10.54″N 11°15′3.57″E

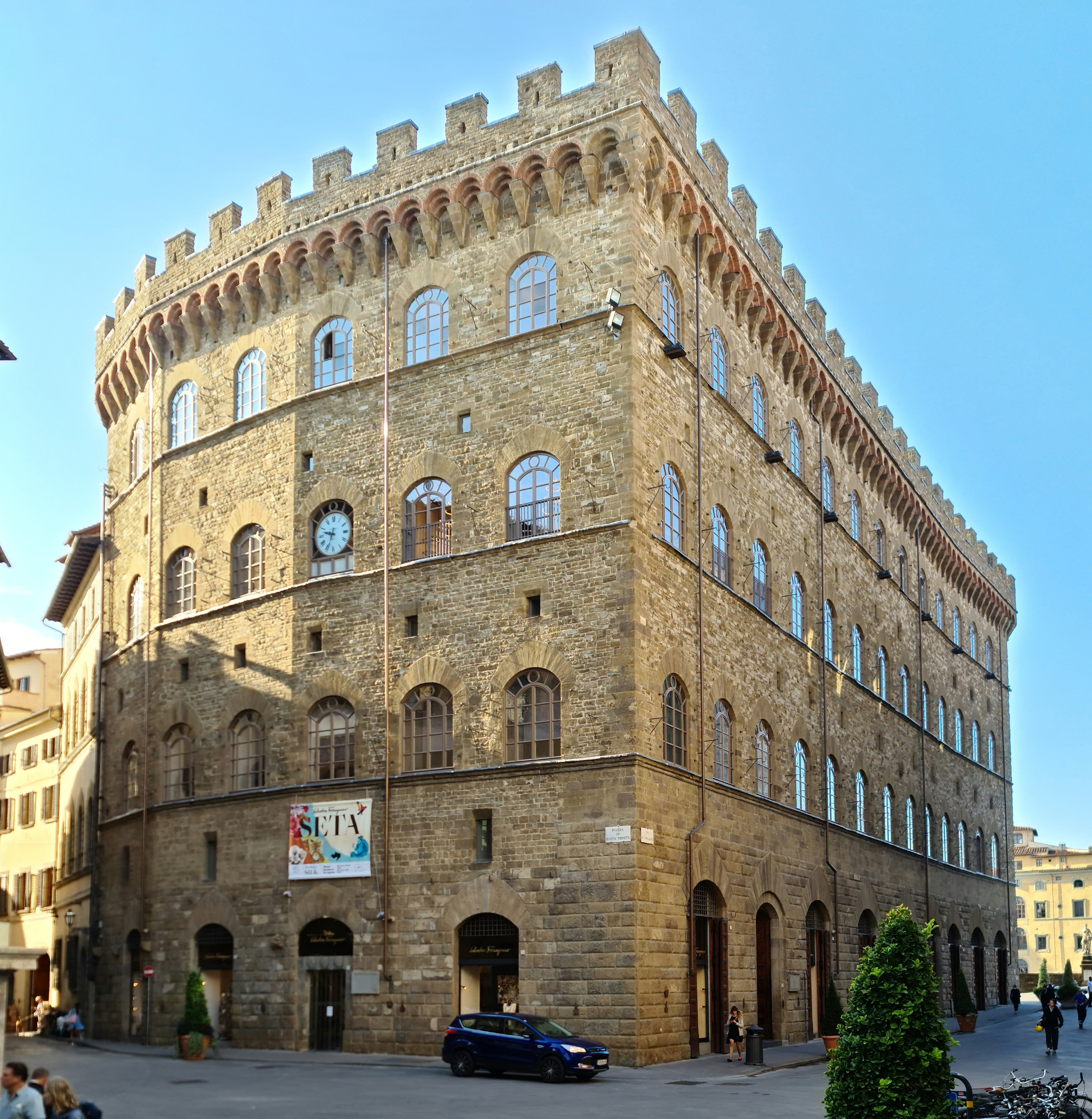
Palazzo Spini Feroni

Palazzo Spini Feroni is a large Gothic palace located along Via de' Tornabuoni at the corner of Piazza Santa Trinita, in central Florence, Tuscany, Italy. It stands across from the church of Santa Trinita.

== History ==
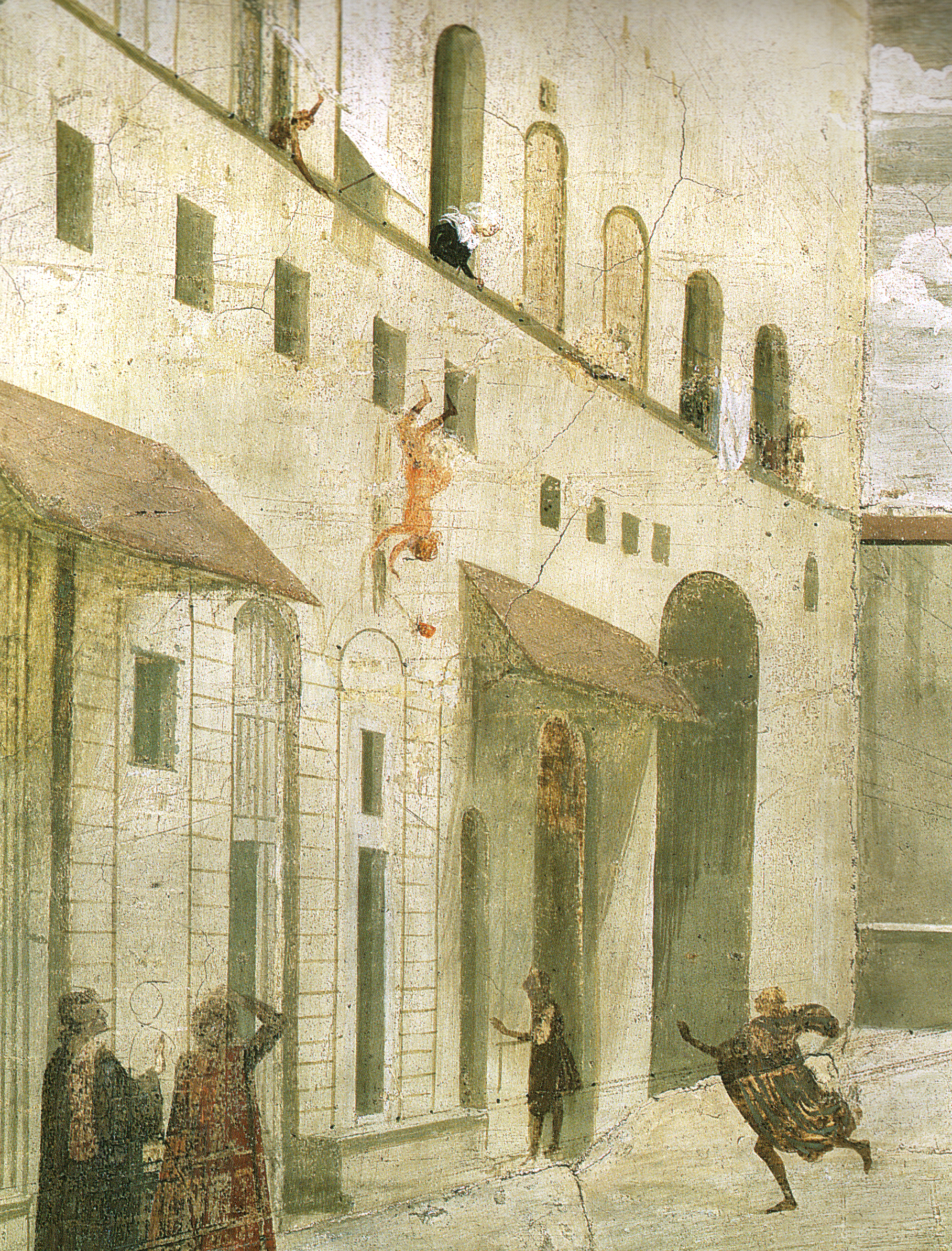
Detail of the fresco of the Resurrection of the Boy by Domenico Ghirlandaio, in the Sassetti Chapel of Santa Trinita

The palace was commissioned in 1289 by the rich cloth merchant and banker Geri Spini, on plots that he had bought after the 1288 flood of the river Arno, from the monks of Santa Trinita.

At the time, it was the largest privately owned palazzo in Florence, rivaling in size the contemporary Palazzo Vecchio, the seat of government of the Republic. The design of Palazzo Spini Feroni has been attributed to list of architects including Arnolfo di Cambio or Arnolfo's father, Lapo Tedesco. The edifice's original appearance can be seen in Ghirlandaio's frescoes in the Sassetti Chapel of the neighbouring church of Santa Trinita. Built during a turbulent medieval century in the city, noted for internecine conflict between families, the palace is a fortress-like stone block, with street level arches in a tall first story, with a protruding cornice surmounted by merlons.

In the 14th century, the palazzo was divided between the two branches of the Spini; the section facing the piazza was sold in the 17th century. In the 1670s, Marquis Francesco Antonio Ferroni, a member of Grand Duke Cosimo III's ruling circle, had it redecorated with stuccoes by Giovanni Battista Foggini and Lorenzo Merlini. During this refurbishment, the frescoes (1609–1612) by Bernardino Poccetti depicting Paradise with a Choir of Musician Angels and Adoration of the Shepherds were moved from their original location.

In 1846, after a spell as a hotel, the palace was purchased by the comune of Florence, and later used for state offices during the period (1865–1871) when Florence was capital of Italy. In 1874, it was partly renovated in neo-medieval style; shop-fronts were opened in the ground floor and a tower and an arch facing the river Arno were demolished, giving the palace the present appearance. In the 1930s, it was bought by the shoe designer Salvatore Ferragamo. Since 1995 the Palazzo has housed a museum dedicated to Ferragamo.
