= Italo Gamberini =

Italian architect

- Born: 21 September 1907; Florence, Kingdom of Italy
- Died: 14 November 1990 (aged 83); Florence, Italy
- Education: University of Florence
- Occupation: Architect

Italo Gamberini (21 September 1907 – 14 November 1990) was an Italian architect.

== Life and career ==
Gamberini graduated from the then School of Architecture in Florence in 1932, where he began his teaching career as a voluntary assistant to Raffaello Brizzi. With his thesis, he conceived the foundation for the design of the new Florence Santa Maria Novella station, built between 1932 and 1935 by the Gruppo Toscano, which included Nello Baroni, Pier Niccolò Berardi, Sarre Guarnieri, Leonardo Lusanna, and Giovanni Michelucci. From 1945, he was a lecturer for the chair of Architectural Elements and Monument Surveying until 1961, when he became a tenured professor. From 1965, he also held the chair of Architectural Composition IV and V until 1977 as a full professor, and later until 1982 as an extraordinary professor.

Mainly active in Florence and Tuscany, Gamberini designed the BICA Building, the RAI Regional Headquarters in Florence, the State Archives of Florence, the Luigi Pecci Contemporary Art Center in Prato, and the Veterinary Medicine Faculty building in Pisa.

== Works (selection) ==
- Firenze Santa Maria Novella railway station, Florence (1932–1935, with Nello Baroni, Pier Niccolò Berardi, Sarre Guarnieri, Leonardo Lusanna, and Giovanni Michelucci)
- Palazzina Reale di Santa Maria Novella, Florence (1934–1935, with Baroni, Berardi, Guarnieri, Lusanna, Michelucci)
- Solvay Theatre, Rosignano Solvay (1937)
- Società Singer Headquarters, Florence (1937)
- Villa Sguanci, Fiesole (1942)
- Ponte della Vittoria, Florence (1945–1946, with Baroni, Lando Bartoli, Mario Focacci, Carlo Maggiora)
- Villa Gamberini, Florence (1953)
- Villa Pecchioli, Le Focette, Pietrasanta (1954)
- Cinema Italia, Florence (1955)
- Houses for the Poste Italiane employees, Pistoia (1956)
- Via Alamanni Tower, Florence (1957)
- BICA Building, Florence (1957–1959, with P. Fici)
- Aristide Gabelli Elementary School, Grosseto (1958–1960)
- Church of San Ranieri, Pisa (1960–1971)
- Veterinary Medicine Faculty building, Pisa (1961–1964)
- Commercial and residential building, Bologna (1961–1964, with Loris Macci and Alessandro Grassellini)
- BICA Building, Milan (1962, with Loris Macci and Antonio Bambi)
- RAI Regional Headquarters, Florence (1962–1967, with Macci, Bambi, Luciano Peracchio, and Sergio Barsotti)
- Tower Building, Montecatini Terme (1963–1967, with Macci and Peracchio)
- DeAngeli-Frua Complex, Milan (1963, with Macci and Vinicio Somigli)
- Banca Monte dei Paschi Headquarters, Arezzo (1964, with Bambi)
- State Archives of Florence (1972–1988, with Macci, Franco Bonaiuti, and Rosario Vernuccio)
- Hotel Brunelleschi, Florence (1974–1988, with Bambi)
- Luigi Pecci Contemporary Art Center, Prato (1978–1989)

== Sources ==
- F. Gurrieri; L. Macci; U. Tramonti (1995). Italo Gamberini. L'architettura dal razionalismo all'internazionalismo. Florence: Edifir.
- Elisabetta Insabato; Cecilia Ghelli, eds. (2007). Guida agli archivi di architetti e ingegneri del Novecento in Toscana. Florence: Edifir. pp. 185–189.
- Andrea Bulleri (2006). Italo Gamberini. Gli elementi costitutivi e la dimensione urbana del progetto. Pisa: ETS. ISBN 978-88-467-1662-0.
- Daniela Petrone (2010). Italo Gamberini. Artigiano dell'architettura. Florence: Alinea. ISBN 978-88-6055-588-5.
- Rosamaria Martellacci, ed. (2011). Italo Gamberini architetto (1907-1990). Inventario dell'archivio. Florence: Edifir. ISBN 978-88-7970-480-9.
- Vittorini, Rosalia (1999). "GAMBERINI, Italo". Dizionario Biografico degli Italiani (in Italian). Vol. 52: Gambacorta–Gelasio 2. Rome: Istituto dell'Enciclopedia Italiana. ISBN 978-88-12-00032-6.
