= Palazzina Reale di Santa Maria Novella =

Coordinates: 43°46′40″N 11°14′54″E

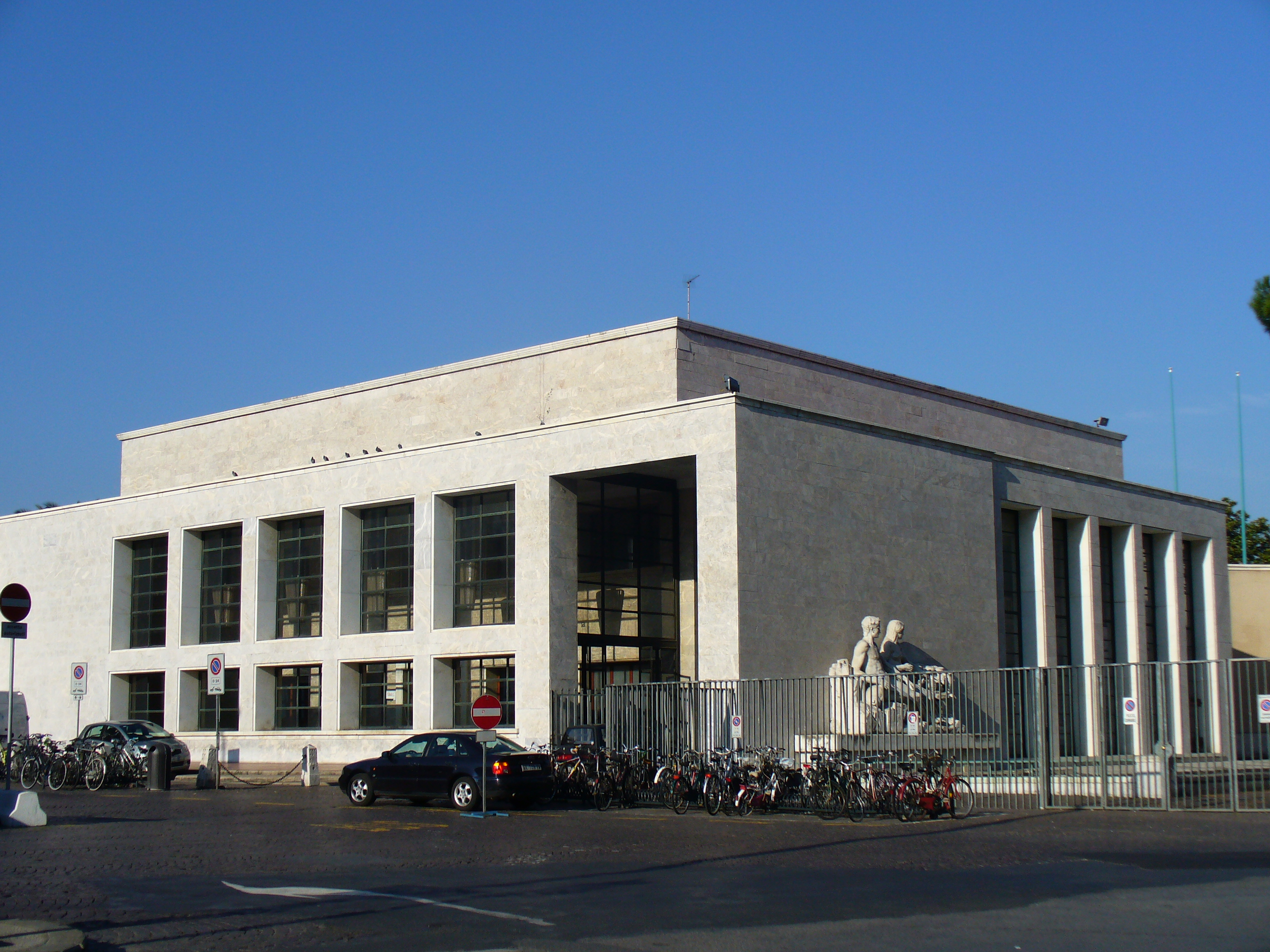
Palazzina Reale exterior

La Palazzina Reale of Santa Maria Novella is a modern, white marble palace built in a sleek Fascist-style, located along via Valfonda and Via Berardi, adjacent to the main Train Station at Santa Maria Novella in Florence, region of Tuscany, Italy. Built in 1934-1935 to house the royal family on their visits to Florence; after recent refurbishment, the building since 2015 houses the Casa dell'Architettura di Firenze (Architecture Society of Florence).

== History ==
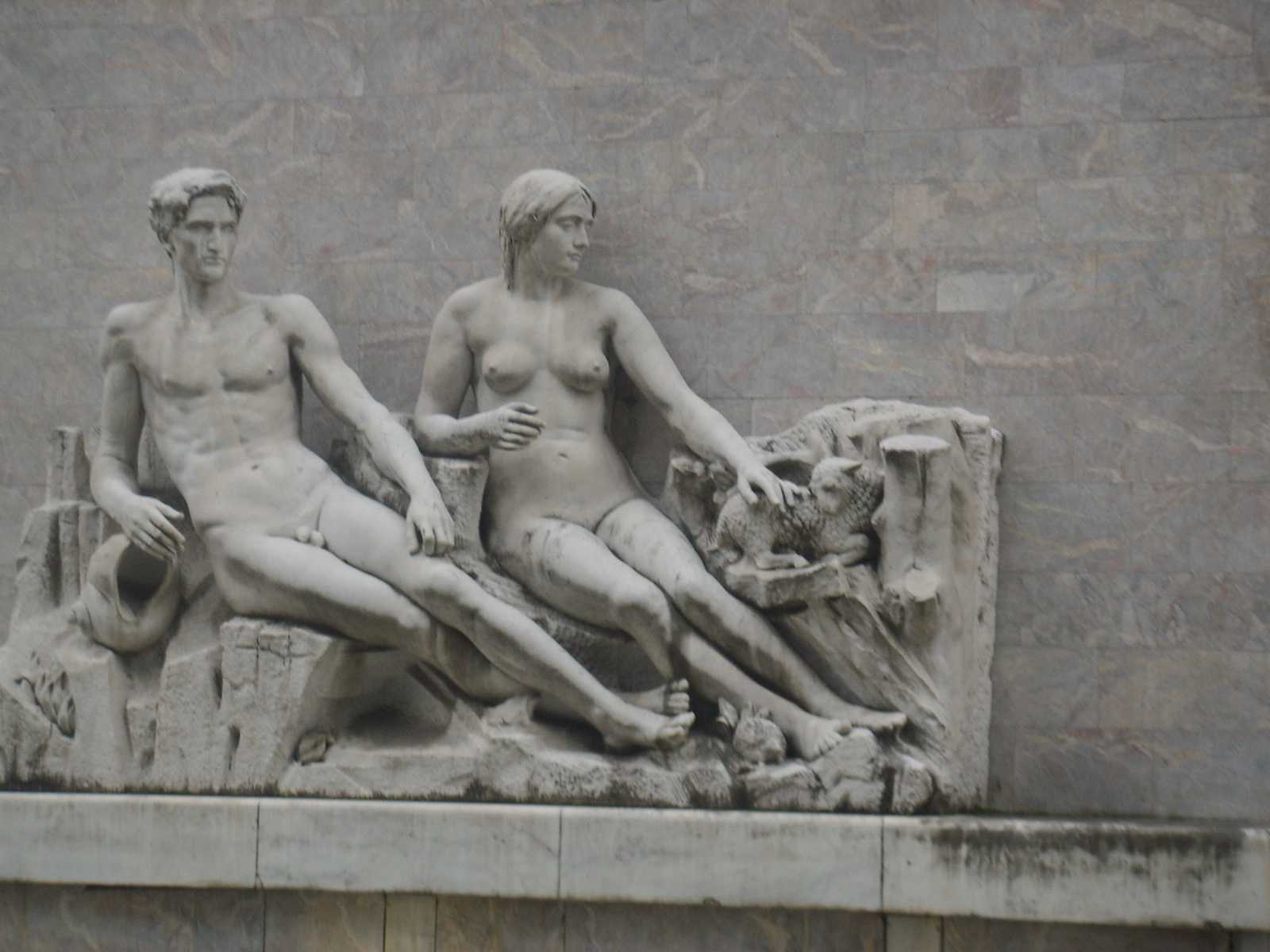
Statuary of Arno and its Valley

The palace was designed by the Gruppo Toscano of architects led by Giovanni Michelucci and the interior was decorated using various color marbles by Italo Gamberini and Pier Niccolò Berardi.

Along the outside is a basin with a statuary group of a man and women depicting The Arno and it Valley by Italo Griselli. The entrance is through well lit porticos.

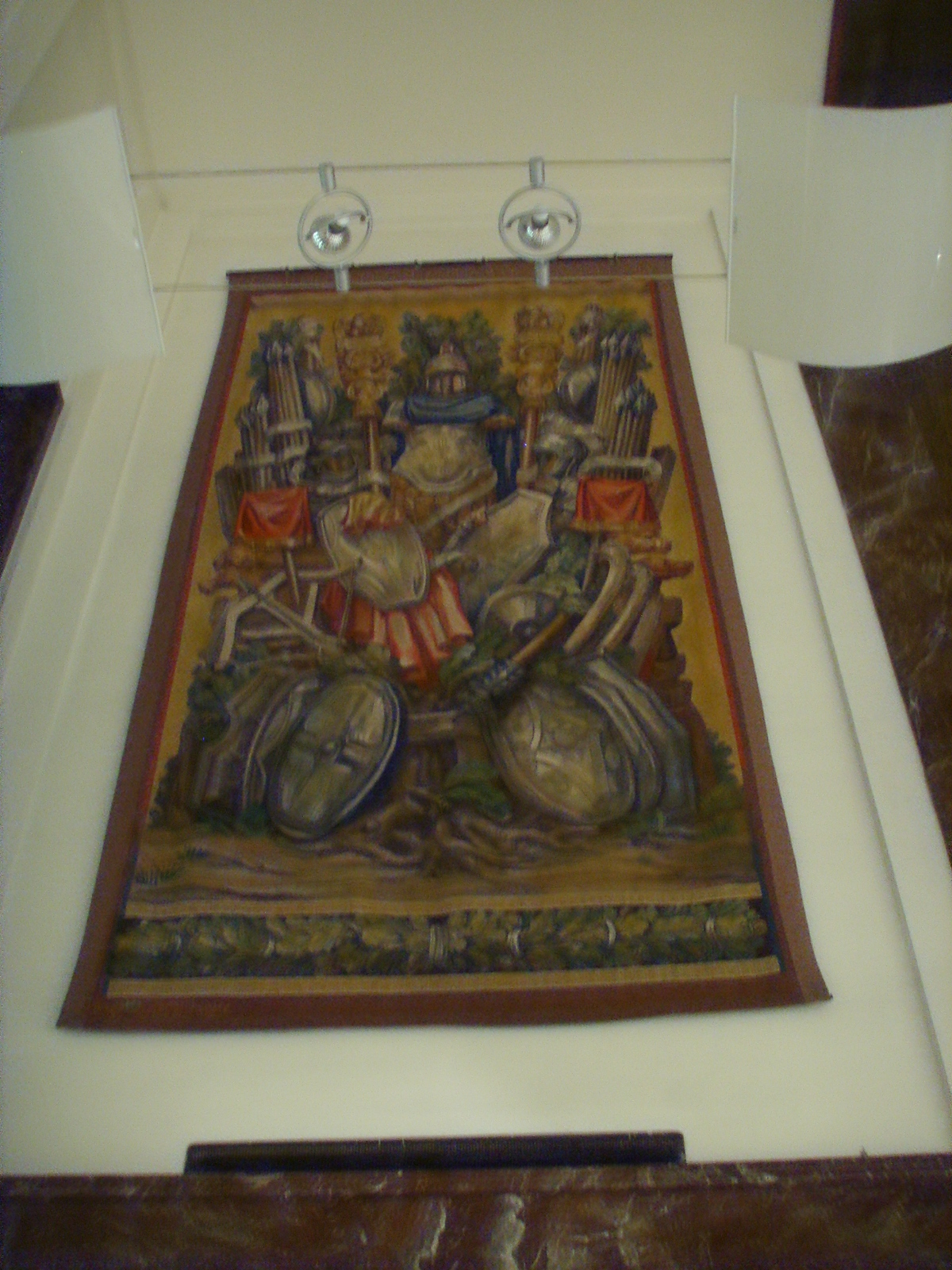
Tapestry in Presidential Hall with Roman armor and weapons

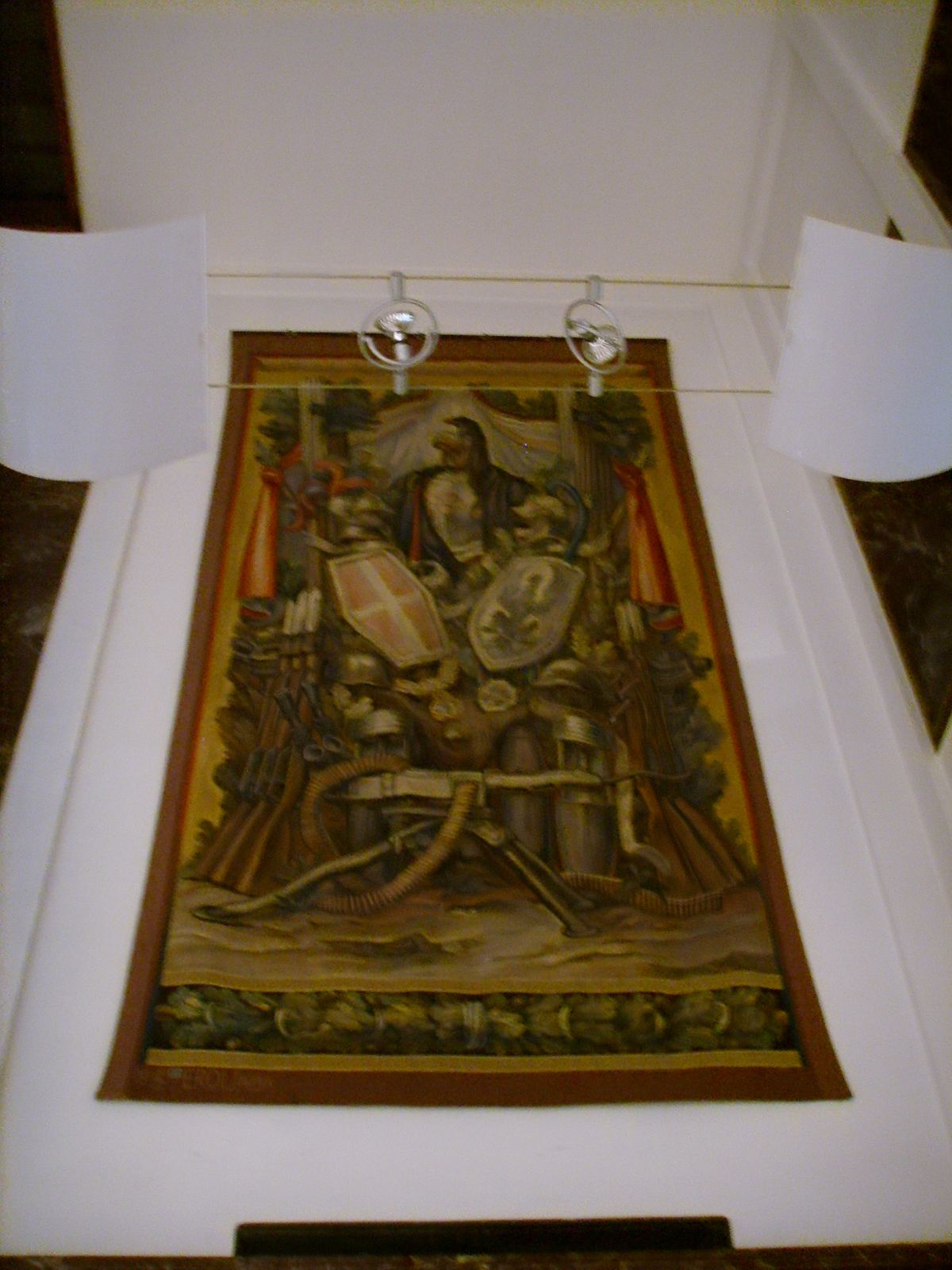
Tapestry in Presidential Hall with modern armor and weapons

The interior uses fine marbles from across Italy, including green serpentine marble of the Alps, fish-veined marble, white Carrara marble, red Levanto marble, pink Castelpoggio marble, and the multicolored-veined Arni marble. The main salon is ten meters high, and illuminated through a glass mosaic curtain, which derives light through alabaster slabs. In this hall, known as the presidential hall, are hung four tapestries that including ominous depictions ancient and modern militaristic themes, including two facing works, one depicting ancient Roman armor, fasces, and eagle standards, and the other, a collection of modern armaments. The stucco decorations on the piano nobile (first floor) depict an episode of the siege of Florence, designed by Mario Moschi, and the construction of the dome by Brunelleschi, designed by Giannetto Mannucci.
