= Dilvo Lotti =

Italian painter

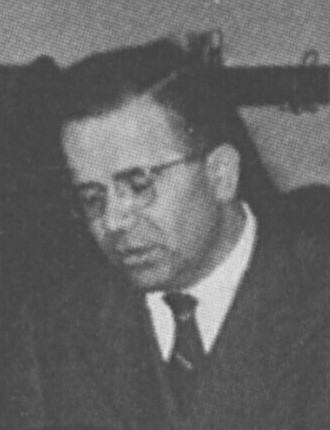
- Born: 27 June 1914; San Miniato, Italy
- Died: 22 April 2009 (aged 94); San Miniato, Italy
- Occupation: Painter
- Awards: Italian Medal of Merit for Culture and Art; Commander with Star of the Order of Saint Gregory the Great

Dilvo Lotti (27 June 1914 – 22 April 2009) was an Italian painter.

== Biography ==
Dilvo Lotti studied at Porta Romana Art Institute in Florence where he graduated in 1935 writing a thesis on Honoré Daumier.

His work was part of the painting event in the art competition at the 1936 Summer Olympics.

In 1968 he painted a crucifix for the Church of the Autostrada del Sole near Florence.

He was Roman Catholic.
