= Carabinieri of Fiesole =

The Carabinieri of Fiesole were three Italian soldiers who were killed by Nazis on August 12, 1944. On August 11, the three Carabinieri - Alberto La Rocca, Vittorio Marandola and Fulvio Sbarretti (with their commanding officer Francesco Naclerio received orders to leave their barracks in Fiesole, so to be able to collaborate in the liberation of the nearby city of Florence from German occupation. All four, together with the commander of the barracks, Giuseppe Amico, participated actively in the Italian resistance movement.

After they were trapped in Fiesole, the soldiers went into hiding in ruins of the local Roman theater. On August 12, after the Germans discovered the empty Carabinieri barracks, the commanding officer threatened to kill ten civilians previously taken hostage. Having been notified of this, the four Carabinieri decided to turn themselves in. Naclerio was forced to return to service, the other three soldiers brutally interrogated before they were shot to death at the Hotel Aurora. In 1946, the three Carabinieri were awarded the Gold Medal of Honor for Military Service. For the 70th anniversary of their sacrifice, in 2014, a fictionalized account of the story was the subject of a movie made for Italian television: A testa alta - I martiri di Fiesole.

== Monument in Fiesole ==
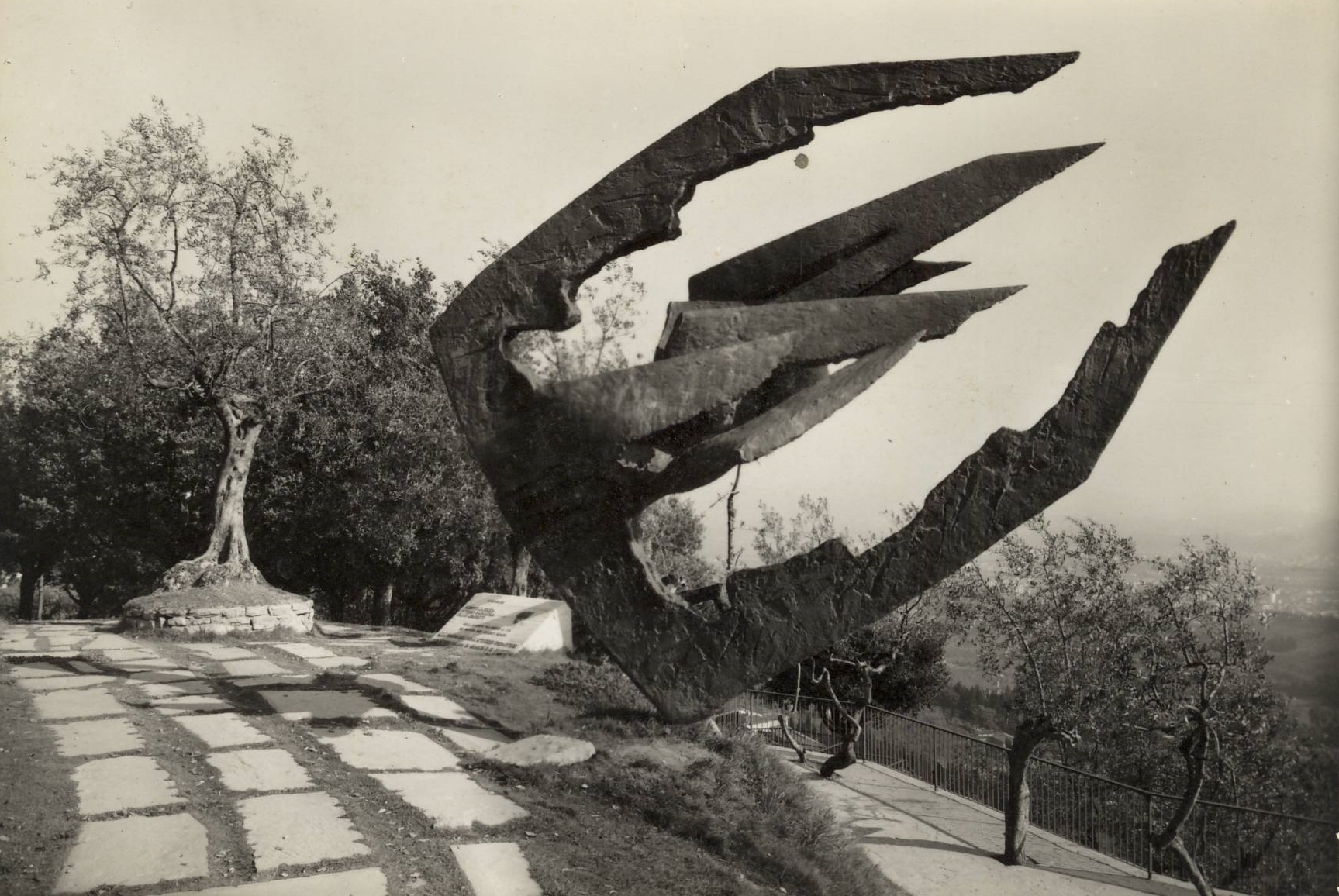
Monument in Fiesole, Italy.

The Monument to Three Carabinieri is a bronze monument in Fiesole, Italy, commemorating the sacrifice of the three Carabinieri. In 1964, the city of Fiesole decided to honor the memory of the three Carabinieri by commissioning a major monument. Living in Fiesole at the time was Giovanni Michelucci, one of the most important Italian architects of the twentieth century. He was given the responsibility of adapting the Park of Remembrance (Parco della Rimembranza) to be able to host the new monument. Originally built in the 1920s to honor local soldiers who died in World War I, the park was expanded by Michelucci with a new terrace, complete with beautiful views of Florence and the Arno valley. Michelucci also organized a competition for the monument commission, in which four Tuscan artists were invited to submit project proposals: Vitaliano De Angelis, Marcello Guasti, Mino Trafeli, and Iorio Vivarelli.

Guasti, a Florentine engraver, painter and sculptor born in 1924, was awarded the opportunity to design a large bronze sculpture, measuring over four meters high. The artist faced two main problems while designing this work; on one hand, he needed to find a way to honor the Three Carabinieri, reminding viewers of their heroism, and on the other, he needed to work in harmony with Michelucci, creating a work with relation to its physical location in the Park. Guasti's solution involved creating a statue with an aggressively dynamic shape, one that allows a multitude of interpretations. From a pincer emerge tangled tongues of fire, alluding to the symbol of the Carabinieri: a flame. Not only does the monument commemorate a vigorous fight for life, but it also materializes the ongoing pursuit and triumph of liberty. The Monument to the Three Carabinieri, mentioned in all guides of Fiesole and all books on Guasti, is the site of an annual commemoration by the City of Fiesole and the Carabineiri.
