= Stadio Armando Picchi =

Multi-purpose stadium in Livorno, Italy

Coordinates: 43°31′36″N 10°18′51″E

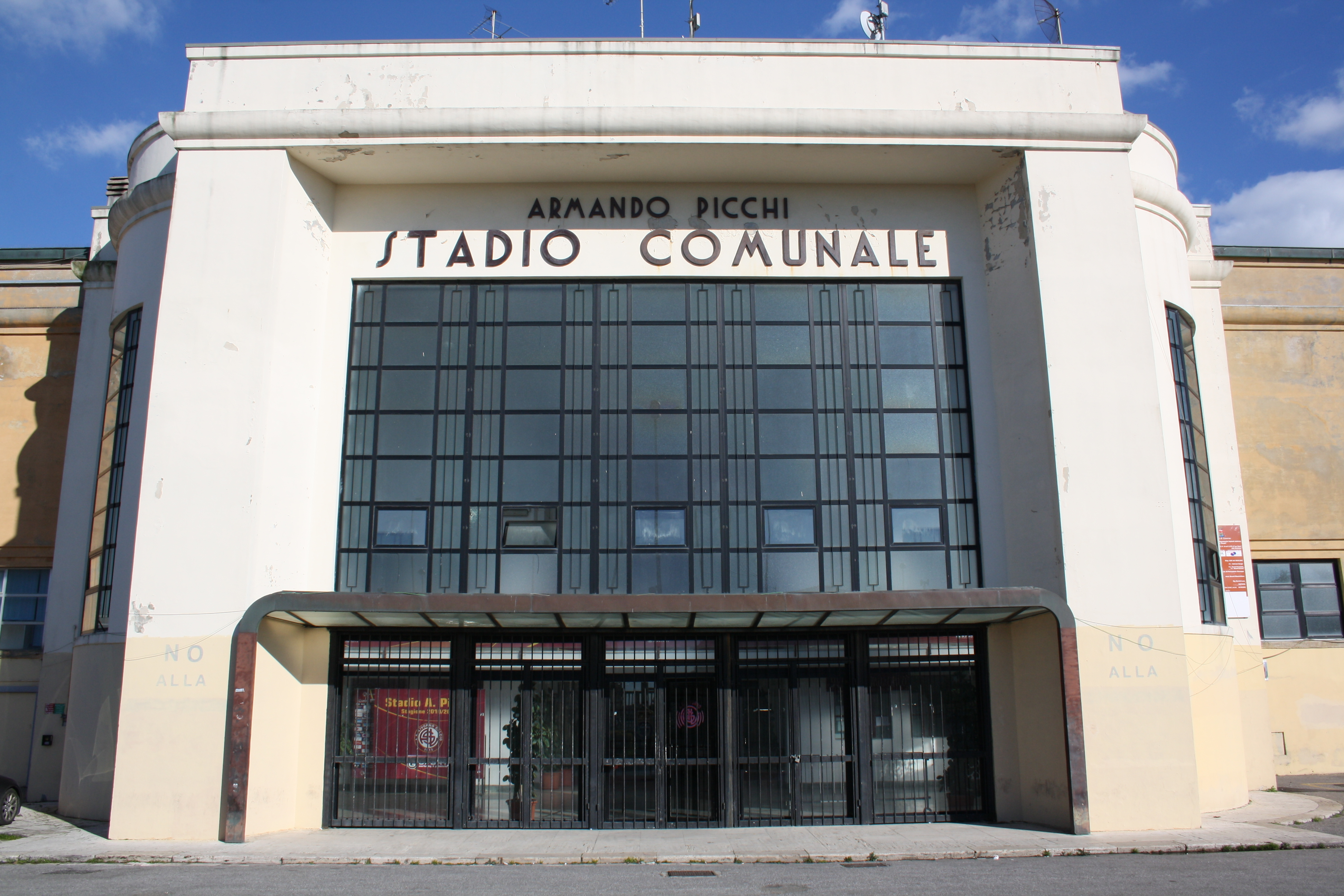
- Interactive map of Stadio Armando Picchi
- Former names: Stadio Edda Ciano Mussolini (1935–1945); Yankee Stadium (post war period); Stadio Comunale di Livorno
- Location: Ardenza, Livorno, Italy
- Owner: Comune di Livorno
- Capacity: 14,267
- Surface: Grass; 107x68m

Construction
- Groundbreaking: 1933
- Opened: 1935
- Renovated: 1980s
- Architect: Raffaello Brizzi

Tenants
- Pro Livorno; U.S. Livorno 1915; Italy national football team (selected matches)

The Stadio Armando Picchi is a multi-purpose stadium in Livorno, Italy.

A.S. Livorno Calcio originally used the Villa Chayes Stadium, part of the nearby the Naval Academy, for matches but when the city team was promoted to the Serie A in 1928-29 Divisione Nazionale a new and larger facility was required.

== History ==
The new stadium was built in 1933 on project by Raffaello Brizzi, with a capacity of 19,234, at Ardenza Mare district and was named after Edda Ciano Mussolini until 1945. It was built in reinforced concrete, has an area of 30,000 square metre and two rectilinear 90m stands

The first match, Livorno vs. ACF Fiorentina, was played on 8 October 1933 when the stadium was incomplete. Its inaugural match, on 24 March 1935, was Italia B vs. Austria B.

In the post war period it was used by the Americans from the nearby Camp Darby logistic base who renamed it “Yankee Stadium” for the occasion. The stadium was then designated Stadio Comunale di Livorno and for the 1960 Summer Olympics underwent a summary renovation. It hosted some of the football preliminaries in 1960, but was overlooked for Italia 90.

In 1971, the stadium was renamed after the Livorno born footballer Armando Picchi who started playing at his home club before ending his career with Inter.

In the 1980s it underwent a reconstruction with the demolition of the distinctive Torre Maratona.

In 2005 the stadium was renovated in order to improve the safety and the capacity of the structure to mark the return of Livorno to Serie A.

In 2021, the grandstand of the stadium was named after Mauro Lessi, the player who holds the record of longevity with the A.S. Livorno Calcio. In 2022, the grass field was replaced with synthetic grass.

== Gallery ==
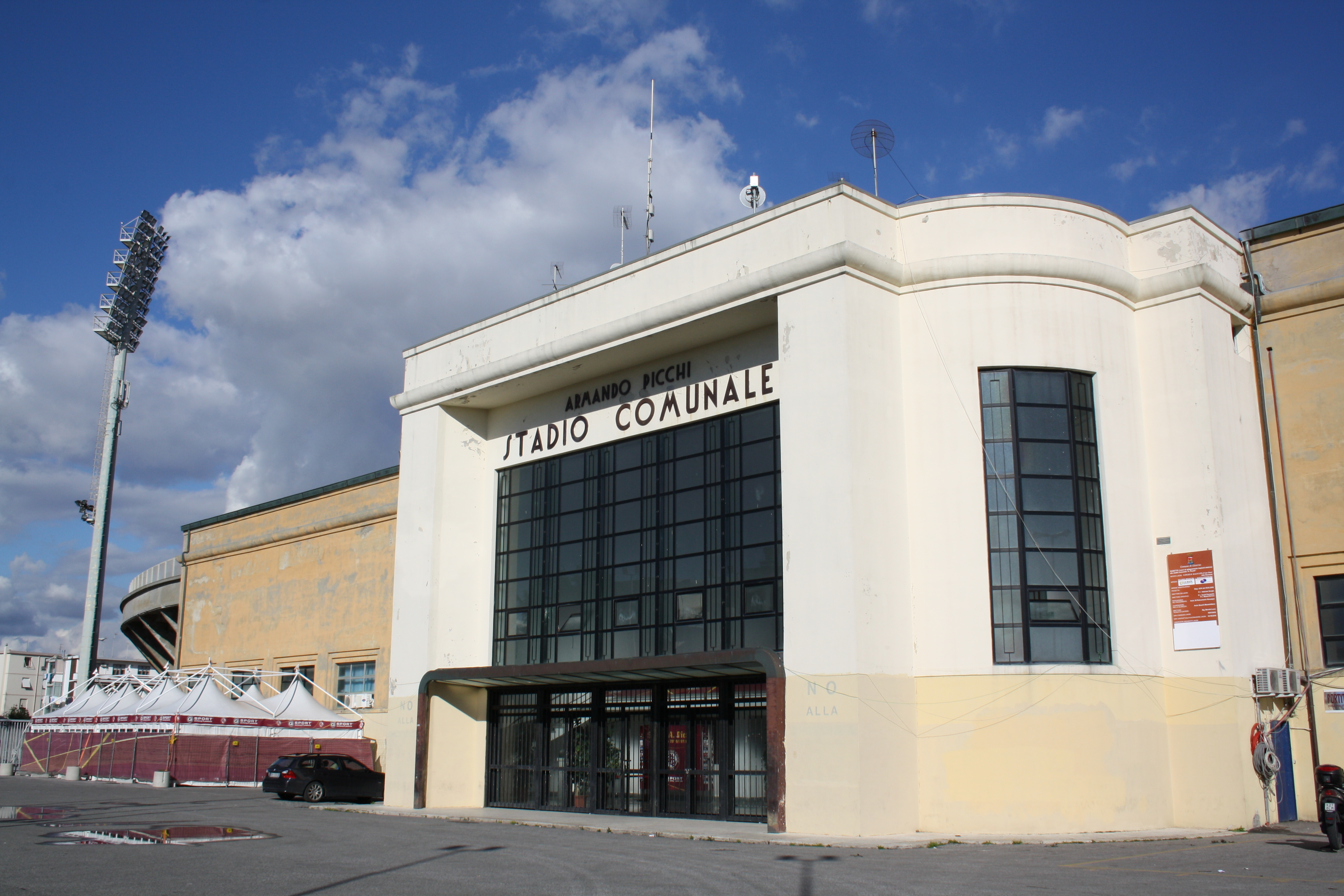

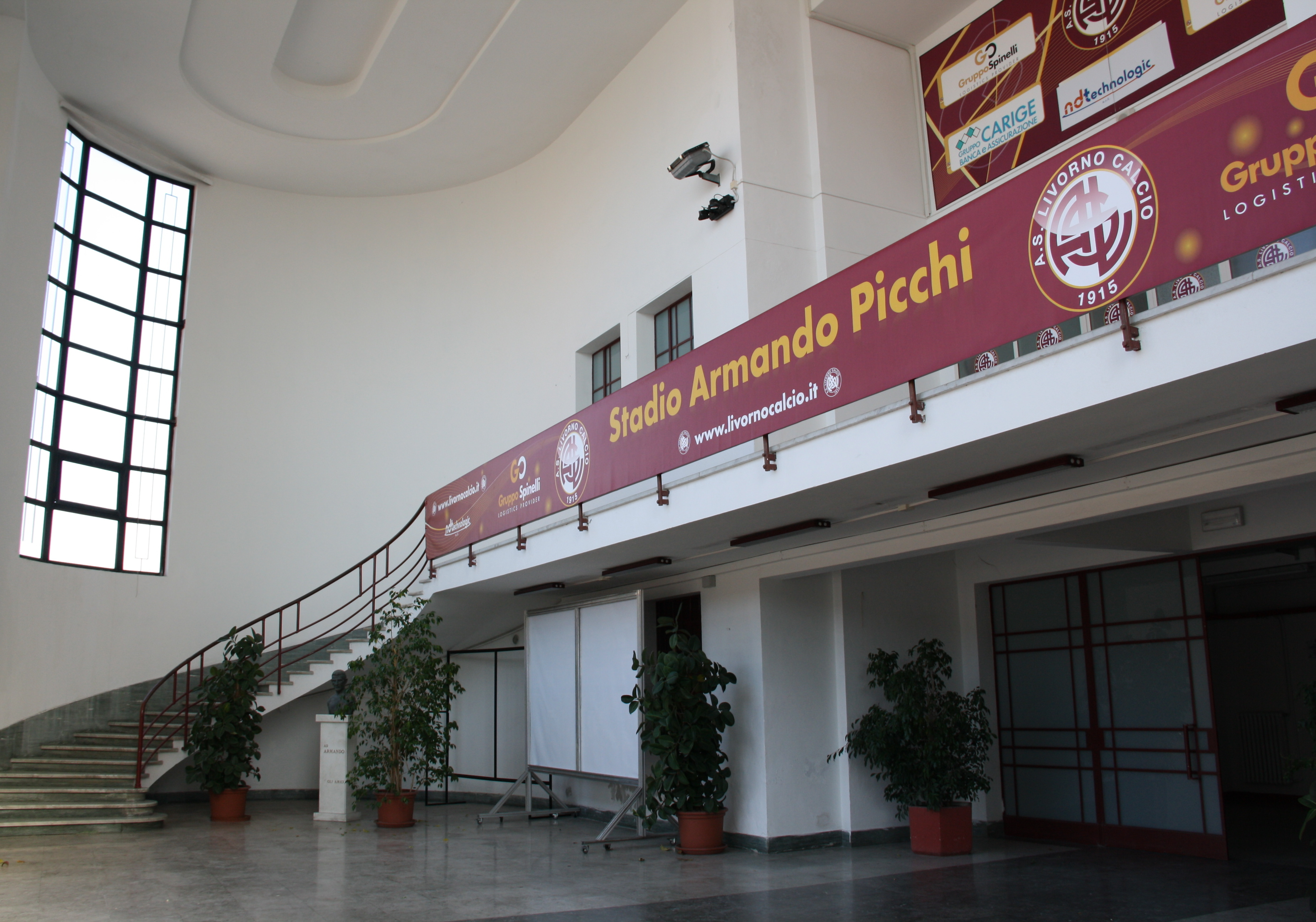

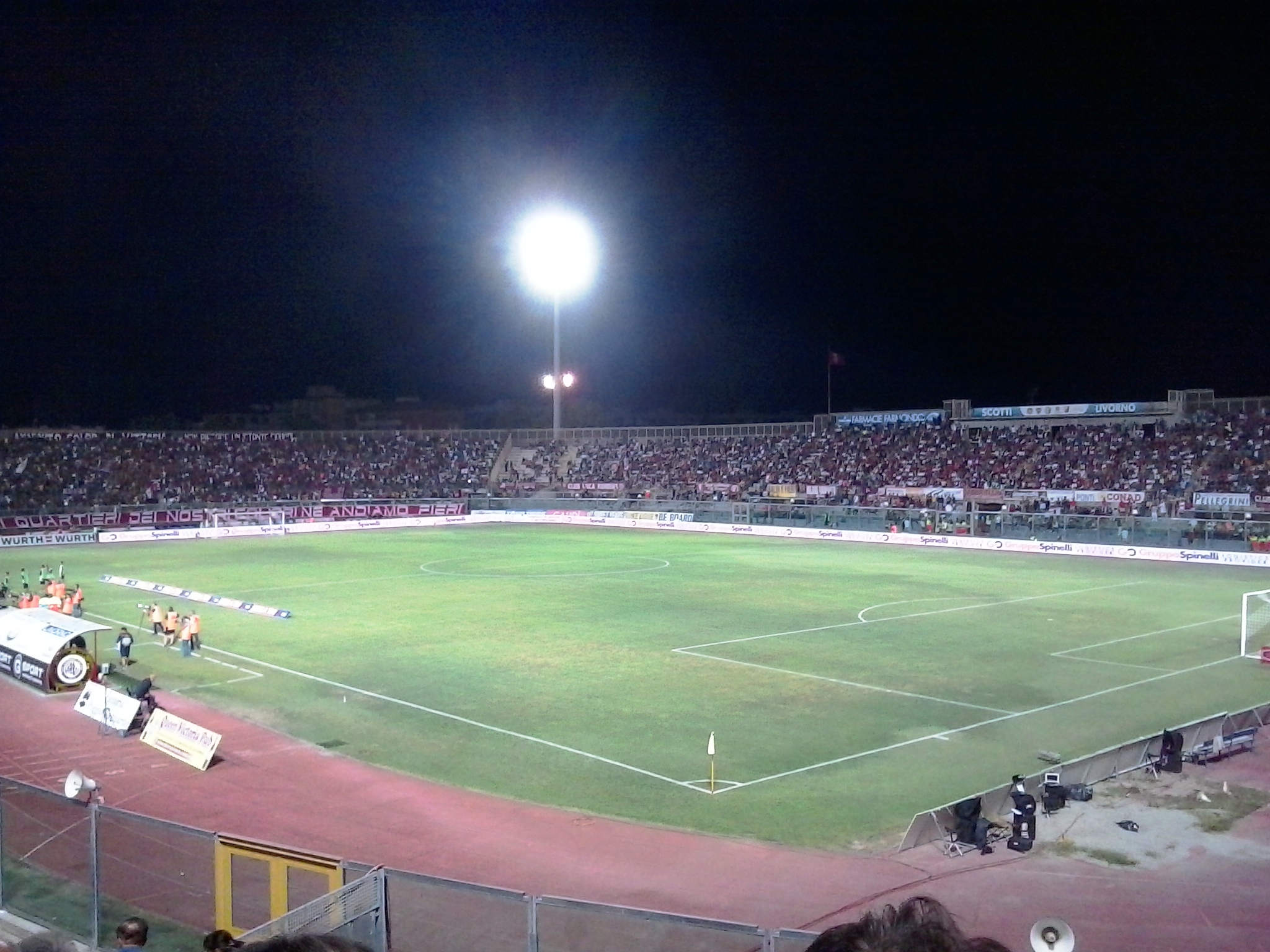

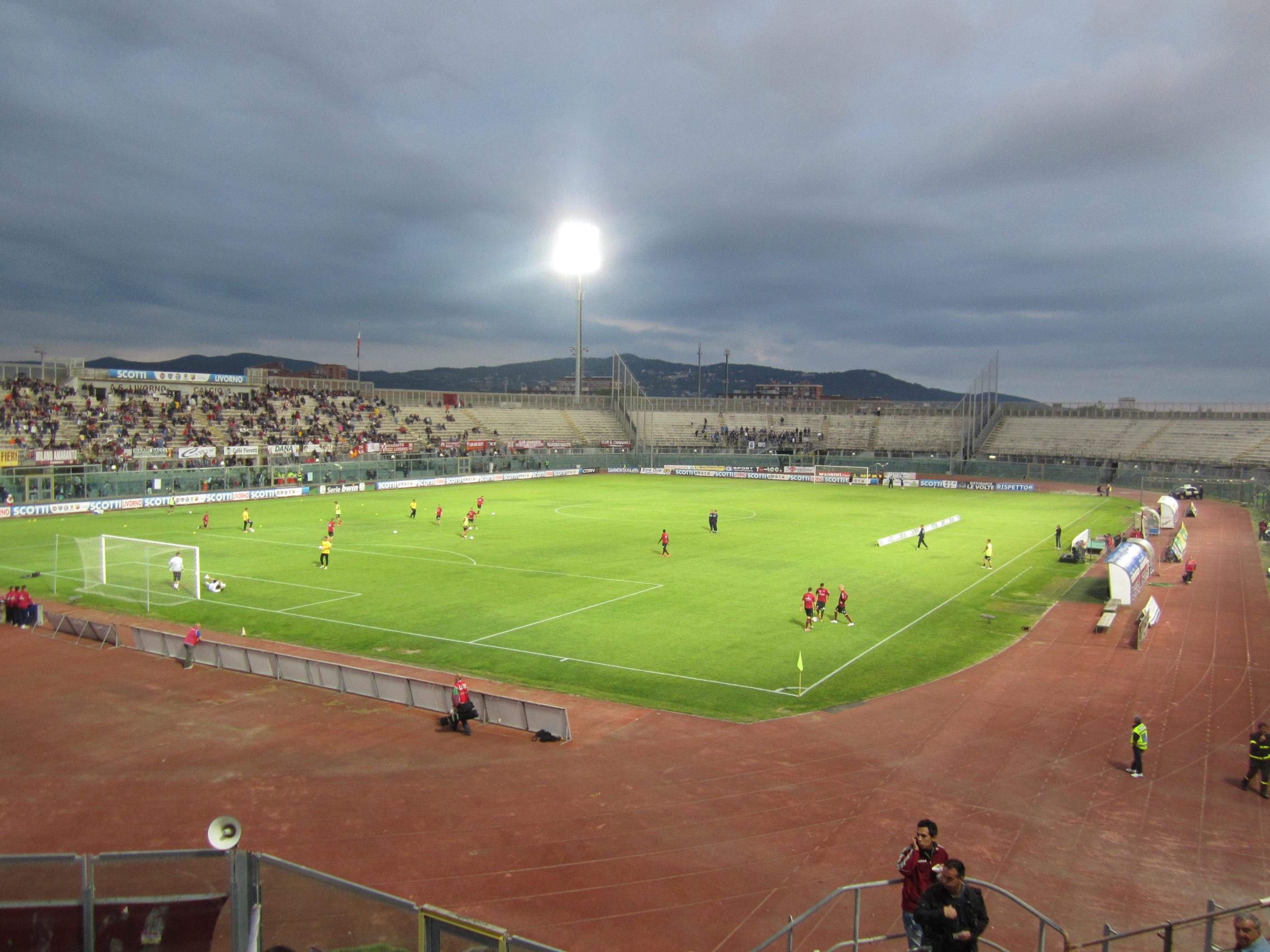

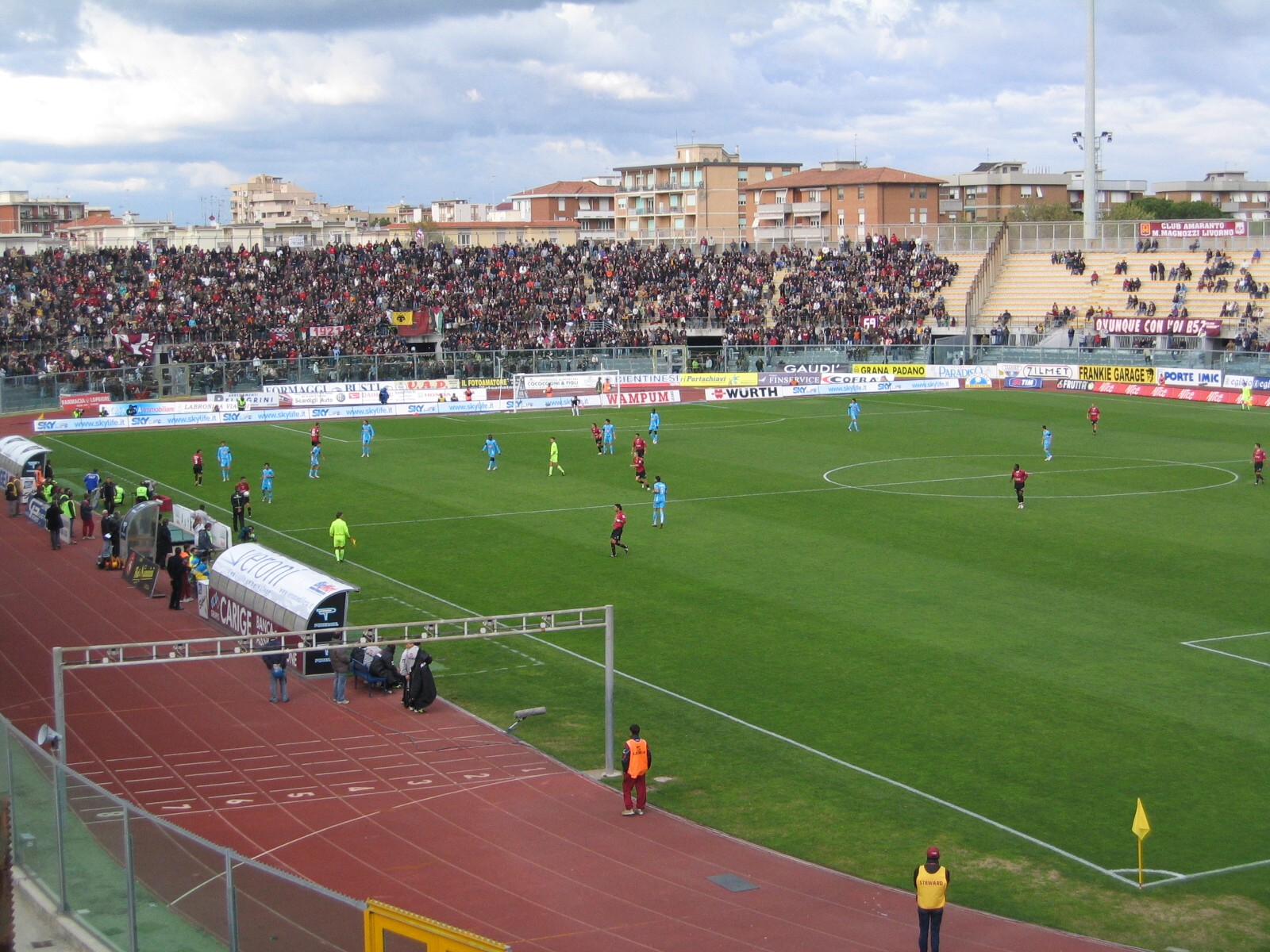

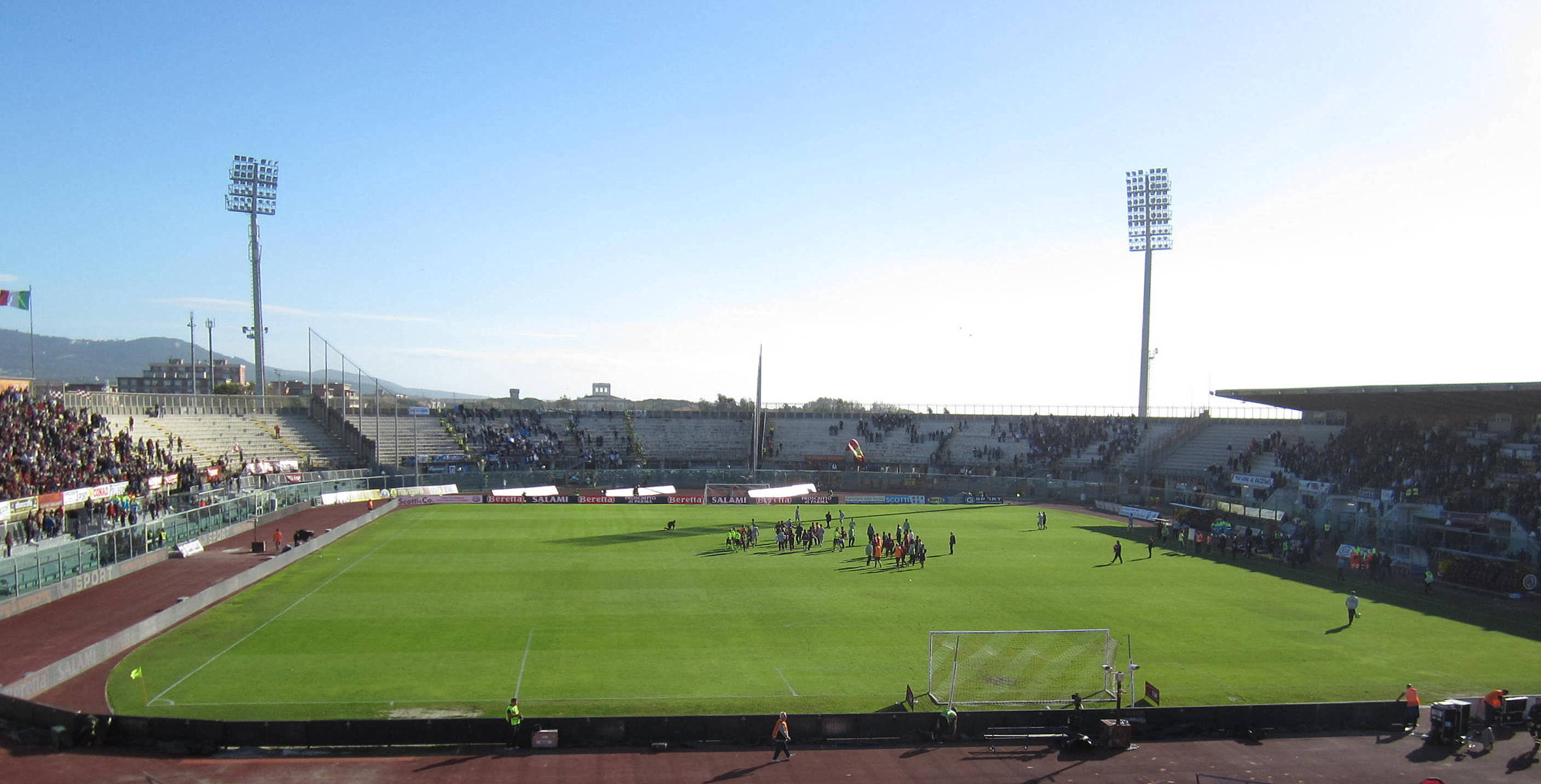

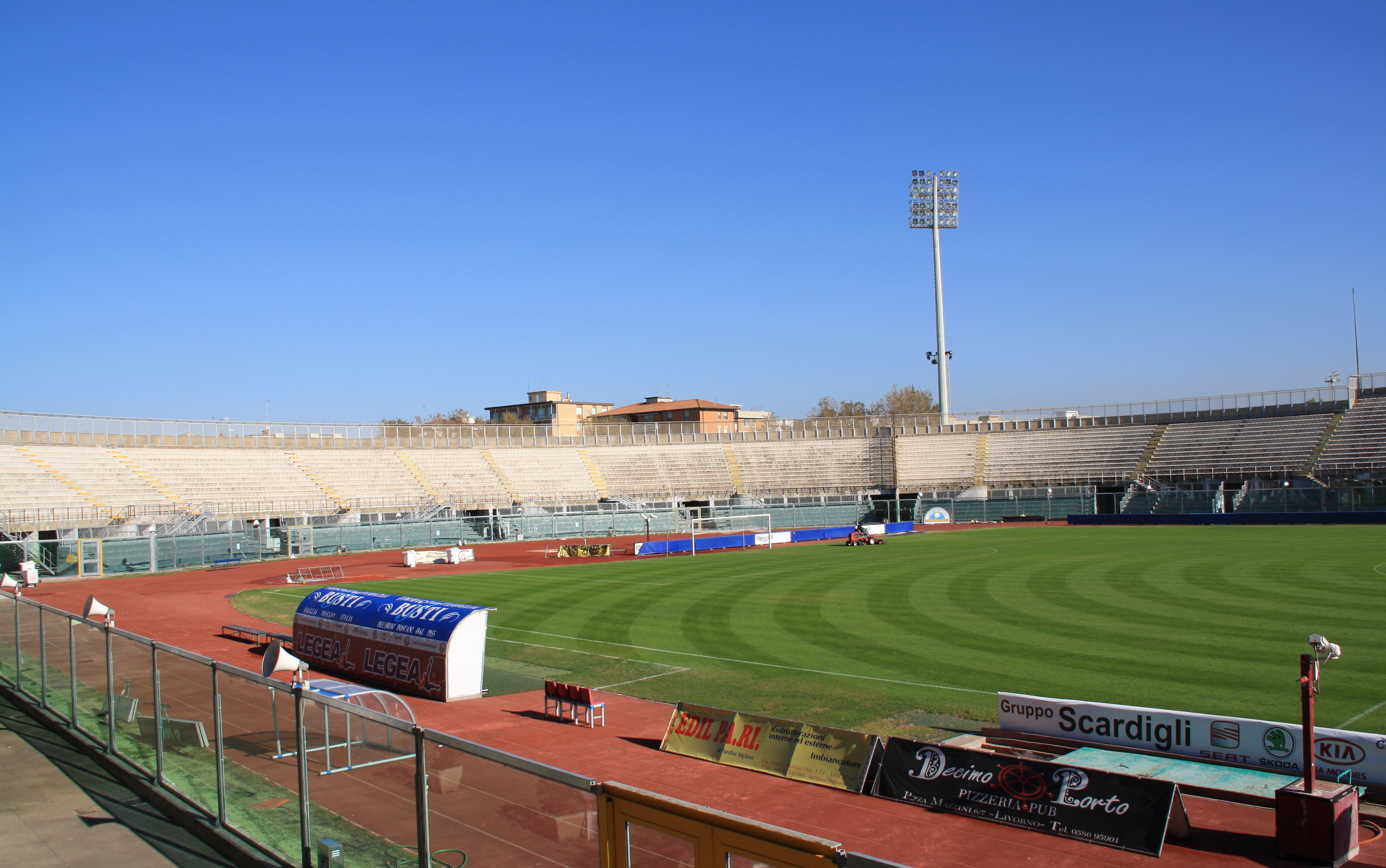

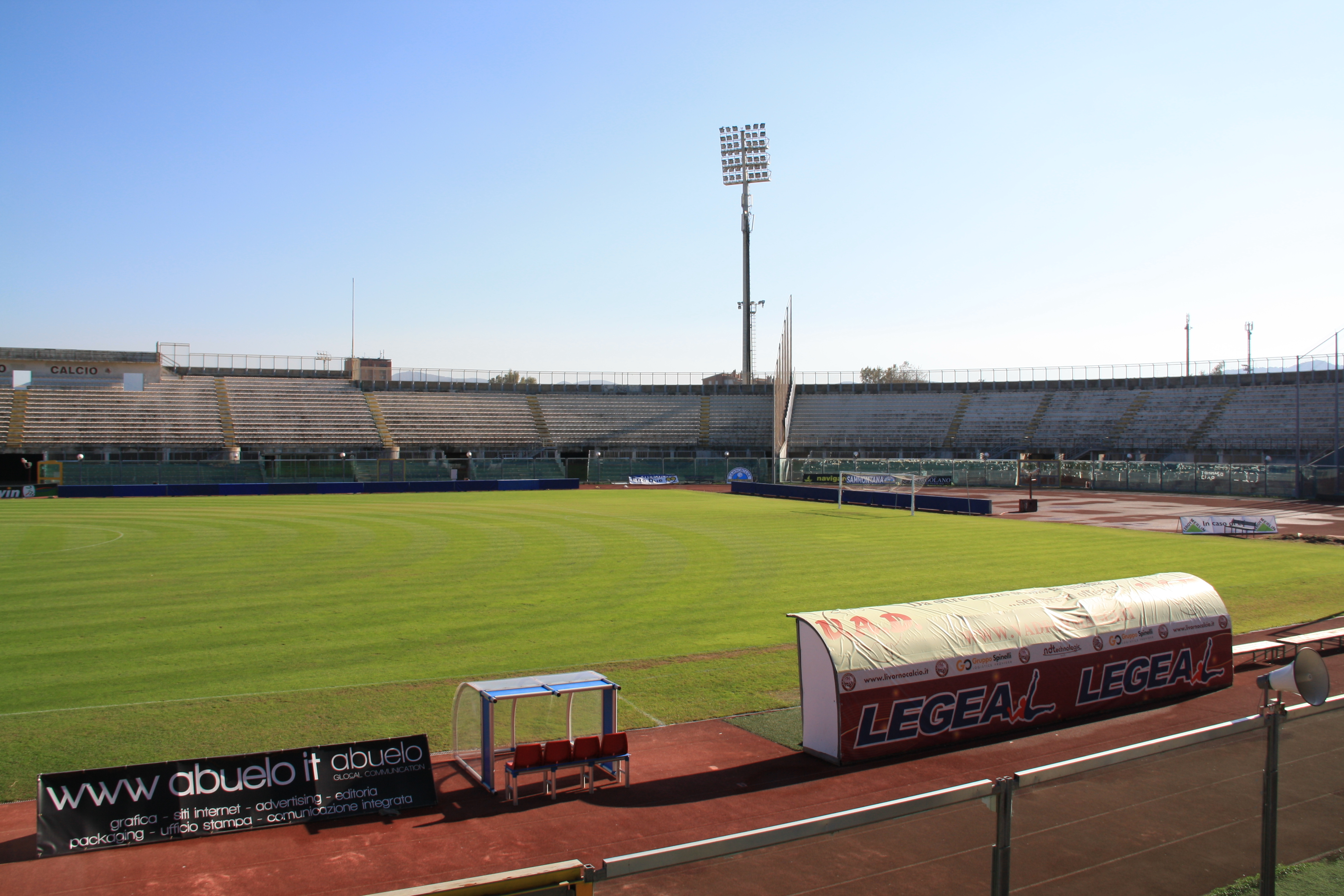

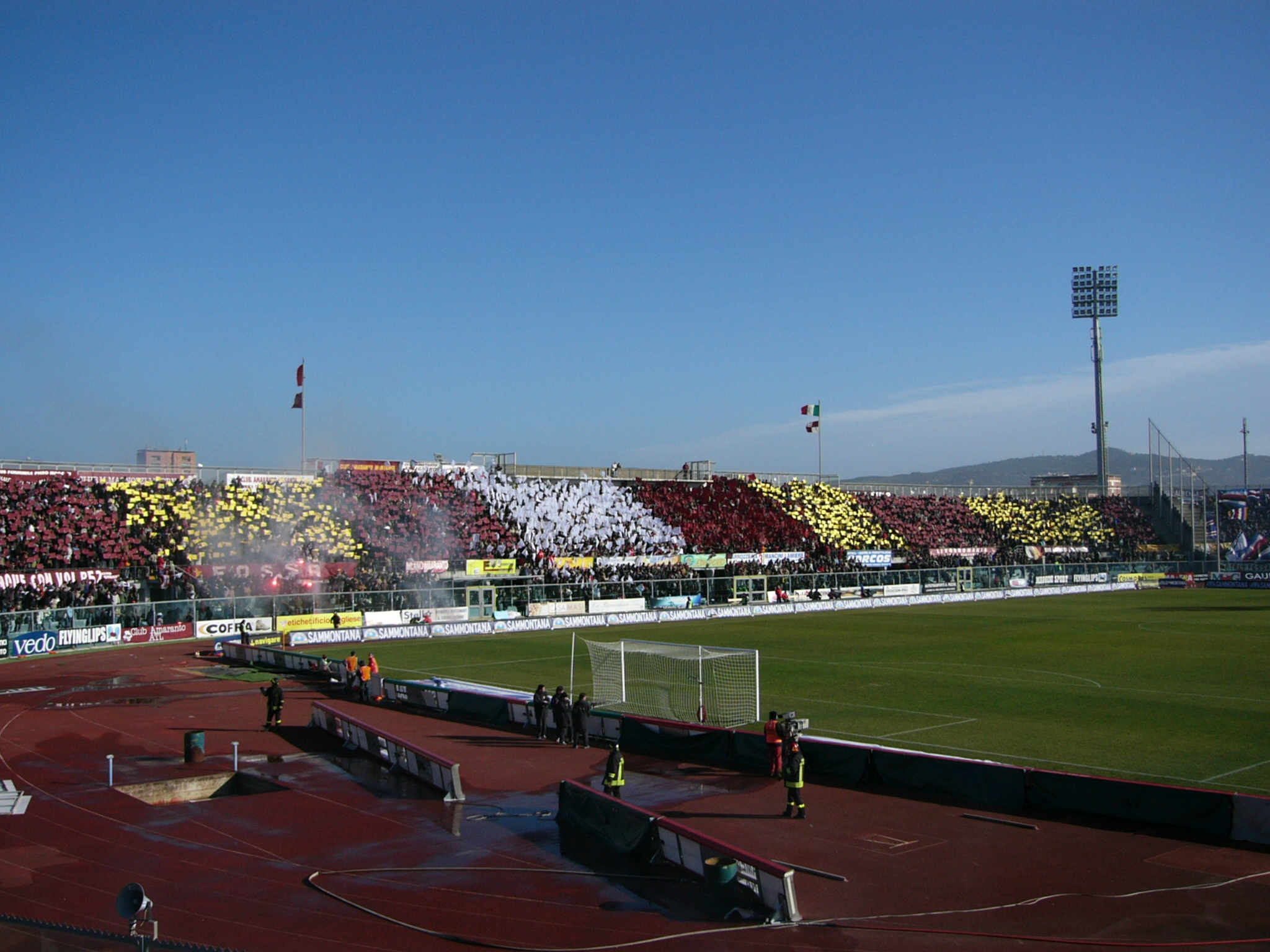

== See also ==
- A.S. Livorno Calcio
