= Nello Baroni =

Italian architect (1906–1958)

- Born: 27 October 1906; Florence, Kingdom of Italy
- Died: 28 May 1958 (aged 51); Florence, Italy
- Education: University of Florence
- Occupation: Architect

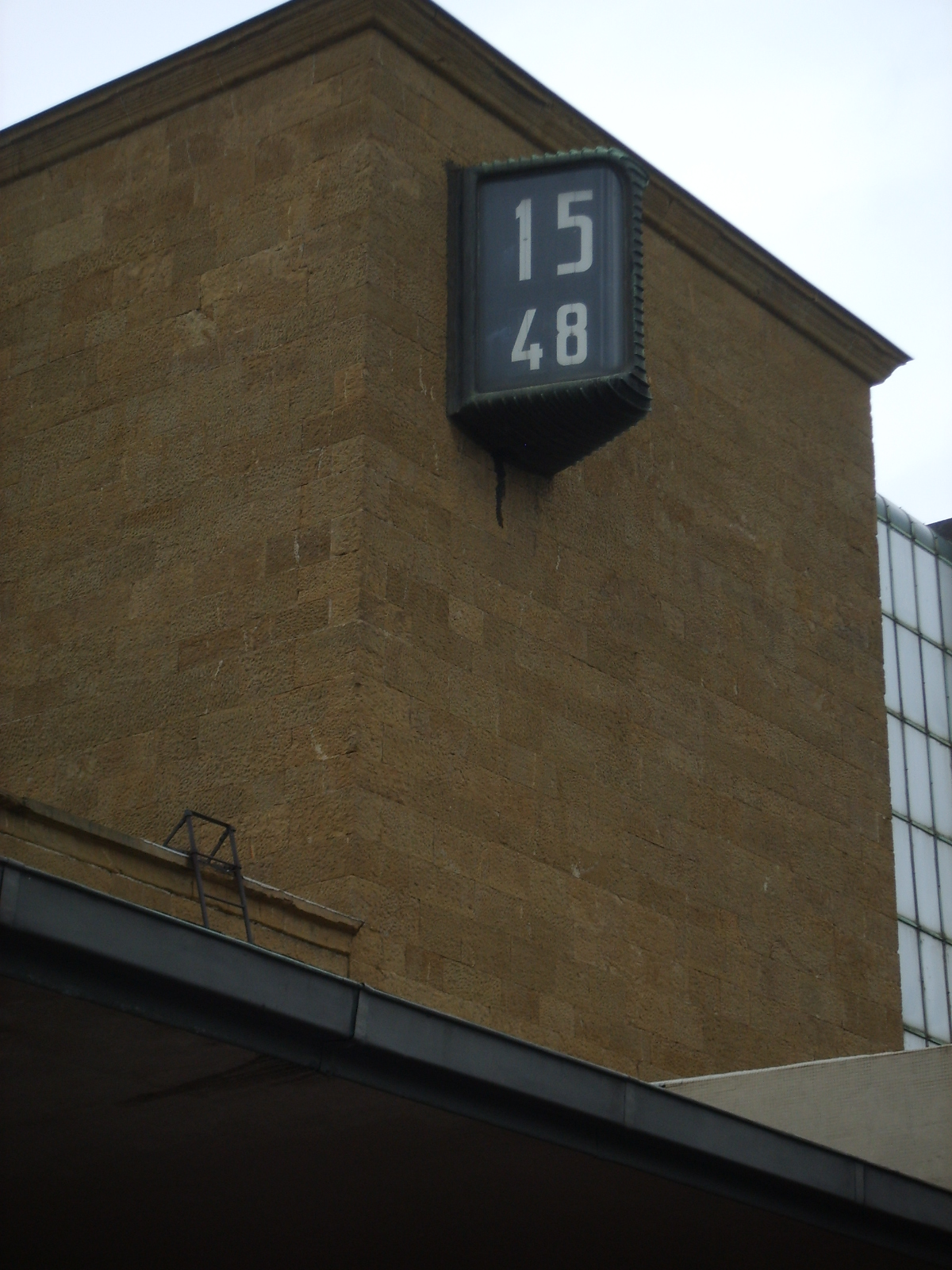
Digital flip clock attributed to Baroni, Santa Maria Novella station, Florence (1935)

Nello Baroni (27 October 1906 – 28 May 1958) was an Italian architect.

== Life and career ==
Baroni graduated from the Higher School of Architecture in Florence in 1933. A pupil of Raffaello Brizzi and Giovanni Michelucci, he collaborated with the latter and Adalberto Libera on the Rational Architecture exhibition in 1932 and contributed to important projects related to the new Florence Santa Maria Novella station, for which he won the competition for the Passenger Building.

Baroni taught at the Florence School of Architecture and also worked in theatre and film set design, creating works such as the Rex Cinema-Theatre in Florence. During the war, he dedicated himself to photography and patented a film projector. After the conflict, he served as a temporary lecturer and engaged in restoration work, including the Ponte alla Vittoria in Florence. He collaborated on numerous projects involving theatrical, cinematic, and university renovations, such as the Teatro della Pergola, Teatro Verdi, Cinema Stadio, and the arrangements of the Aula Magna at the University of Florence. His activities also extended to urban planning and private residential construction.

In 1959, the Accademia delle Arti del Disegno dedicated a retrospective exhibition to him in his honor.

== Bibliography ==
- Cordoni, Claudio (2007). "Nello Baroni". In Elisabetta Insabato; Cecilia Ghelli (eds.). Guida agli archivi di architetti e ingegneri del Novecento in Toscana. Florence: Edifir. pp. 31–37.
- Cordoni, Claudio (2008). Nello Baroni. Architetto (1906-1958). Inventario dell'archivio. Florence: Edifir.
- Godoli, Ezio (1983). Guide all'architettura moderna. Il futurismo. Rome-Bari: Laterza. pp. 98, 110, 204.
- Giovanni Klaus Koenig (1968). Architettura in Toscana 1931-1968. Turin: ERI. pp. 14–16, 24, 30–40, 44–46.
