= Amnon Barzel =

Israeli art curator, author and journalist (1935–2025)

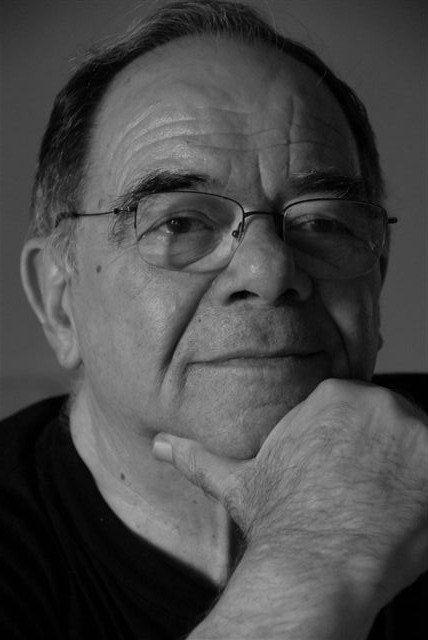
Amnon Barzel

Amnon Barzel (Hebrew: אמנון ברזל; July 5, 1935 – August 9, 2025) was an Israeli internationally known art curator and author.

== Education ==
Barzel was a graduate of the Hebrew University of Jerusalem, where he majored in Natural Science. He earned his post-graduate degree in Art History at the University La Sorbonne in Paris.

== Career ==
Upon his return to Israel, Barzel became a lecturer at the Avni Institute. From 1970 onwards he contributed regularly to the Israeli Newspaper Ha'aretz; in addition he was a lecturer at the University of Haifa on 20th-century art and in 1971 he was a founding Editor of the IsraelI Art Magazine "Painting and Sculpture".

Barzel was appointed Curator at the Venice Biennale for the Israeli Pavilion in 1976 and 1980 where he presented the work of Dani Karavan, Menashe Kadishman, Micha Ullman, and Moshe Gershuni. In 1985 he curated the Israeli Pavilion at the São Paulo Art Biennial. In 1977-78, he was Art Consultant to the mayor of Tel Aviv. Other international posts Barzel was appointed to include Artistic Director of The European Sculpture City (Unesco), Turku, Finland (1992–95); Artistic Director of the Targetti Art Light Collection, Florence, Italy; Consultant for the Phoenix International Art Collection, Tel Aviv (1985); Consultant of the Leube Foundation, Gartenau, Salzburg (1985) Artistic Director of the Mercedes Benz Prize for Contemporary Art, Monte Firidolfi, Italy (1997); Artistic Director of Artostrada (1998); and Curator of the International Project of Environmental Sculpture in Israel (1997–98).

Barzel was also the founding director of Centro per l'arte contemporanea Luigi Pecci in 1988. He left the museum in 1992.

In 1994 Barzel was appointed Director of the Jewish Museum in Berlin. His departure in 1997 followed a controversy about the museum's independence.

== Death ==
Barzel died on August 9, 2025, at the age of 90.

== Publications ==
Barzel authored and edited more than 100 art books, monographs and exhibition catalogues, including:

- Isaac Alexander Frenel. Jerusalem: Massada Press, 1974.
- Art in Israel, Giancarlo Politi Editore, Milan, 1987.
- Two Environments for Peace, Il Bisonte, Florence, 1988.
- Europe Now, Electa, Milan, and Giunti, Florence, 1988.
- Utopia-Italian Art, Palladion A.G., Zurich, 1993.
- Arte e Industria, Marcos y Marcos, Milan, 1996.
- Deutschland Bilder, DuMont, Cologne, 1997.
- German Art, Yale University Press, New Heaven, 1998.
- Joseph Beuys, Silvana Editoriale, Milan, 2001.
- Franco Ionda, Motta Editore, Milan, 2001.
- Dialoghi Europei d’Arte, Editoriale Modo, Amsterdam, 2002.
- Emblema,"Colore e Trasparenza", Torcular Edizioni d'Arte, Rome, 2005.
- Viola: Re-thinking Nature, Skira, Milan, 2005.
- Re-Thinking Nature: Franco Viola, Mondadori Electa, Milan, 2005.
- Israel: Hundred years of Art and Life, Proedi Editore, Milan, 2006.
- Hans Hartung: Monography, Continents, Milan, 2007.
- Arte Ambientale, Villa Celle Sculpture Park, Gli Ori, Pistoia, 2008.

== See also ==
- Visual arts in Israel
