= Leonardo Lusanna =

Italian architect (1908–1973)

- Born: 24 January 1908; Palermo, Kingdom of Italy
- Died: 5 January 1973 (aged 64); Florence, Italy
- Education: University of Florence
- Occupation: Architect

Leonardo Lusanna (24 January 1908 – 5 January 1973) was an Italian architect.

== Life and career ==
Lusanna was born in Palermo in 1908, to a family of railway engineers. After moving to Florence with his family, he graduated in architecture in 1932, studying under Raffaello Brizzi. As a member of the Gruppo Toscano led by Giovanni Michelucci, he participated and won in the 1933 competition for the new Santa Maria Novella station. In the 1930s, he designed buildings in Florence and took part in projects such as the Mancini Stadium in Arezzo. He also became a professor at the University of Florence.

During the war, he became a consultant and later director of the Technical Office of the Valdarno Mining Company, managing mining facilities and services for workers, and became the main mediator with the German authorities. In 1944, he was appointed mayor of Cavriglia, contributing to the reconstruction of the mining sector and infrastructure.

After the war, Lusanna continued his academic activity: from 1945, he held the chair of Building Elements of Architecture until 1970, and held teaching and research roles at the Institute of Constructions, promoting testing laboratories and expanding the library. He also served as inspector for reinforced concrete works and president of the Reinforced Concrete Works Commission of the Order of Architects of Tuscany. As a designer, he worked on the building of the Finance Department in Florence and participated in the renovation of the Rectorate of the University. He died in Florence in 1973.

== Sources ==
- Cappuccini, Chiara (2020). Leonardo Lusanna 1920-1989. Inventario analitico (PDF). Archivio di Stato di Firenze.
- Ghelli, Cecilia (2007). "Leonardo Lusanna". In Elisabetta Insabato; Cecilia Ghelli (eds.). Guida agli archivi di architetti e ingegneri del Novecento in Toscana. Florence: Edifir. pp. 226–228.
