= Centro per l'arte contemporanea Luigi Pecci =

Art museum in Prato

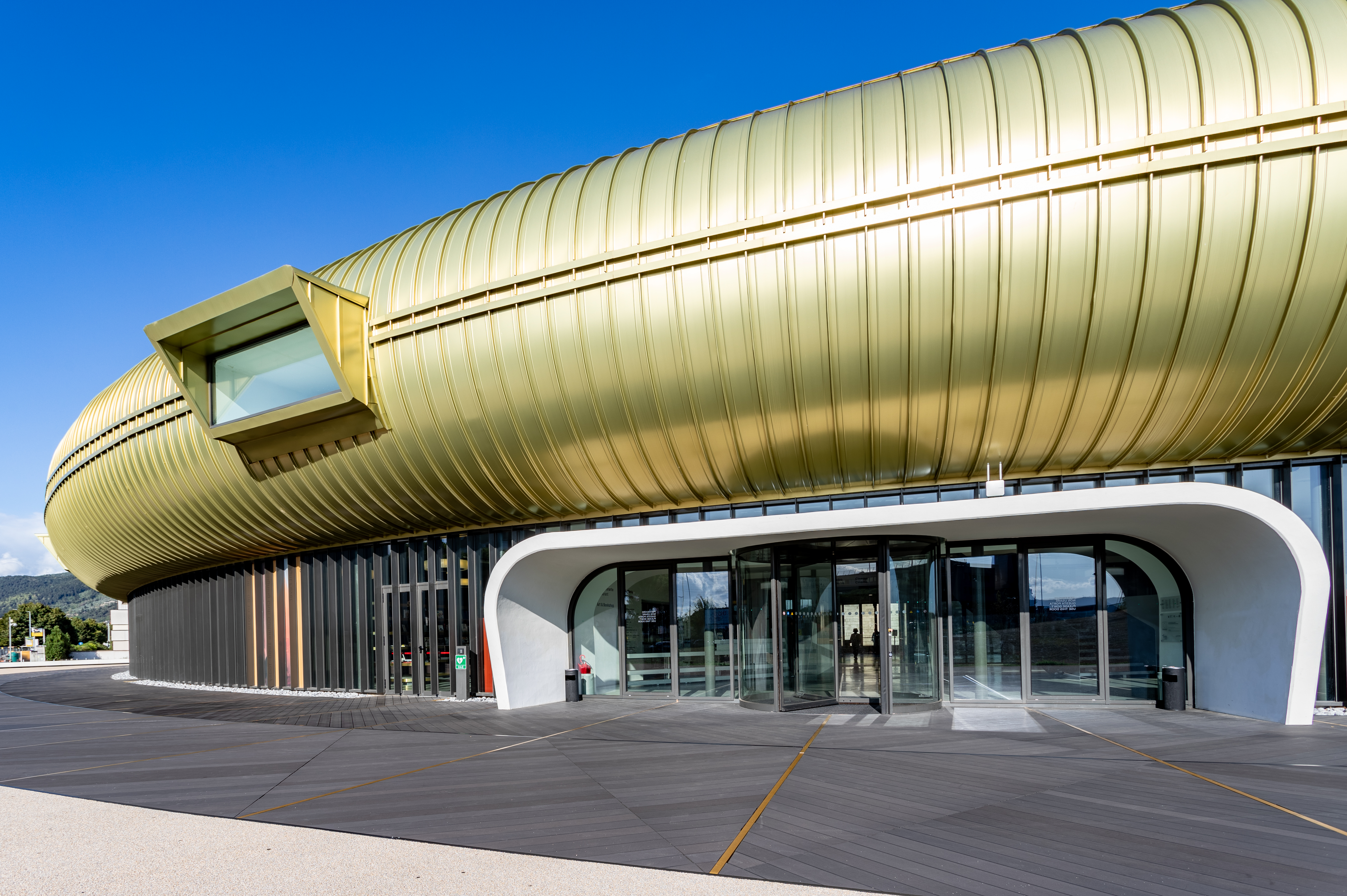
- Museum main entrance
- Established: 1988
- Location: Viale della Repubblica in Prato, Tuscany, Italy
- Coordinates: 43°51′40″N 11°06′30″E
- Director: Stefano Collicelli Cagol
- Website: http://www.centropecci.it/

Centro per l'arte contemporanea Luigi Pecci (Centre for Contemporary Art Luigi Pecci) is a contemporary art centre sited in Viale della Repubblica in Prato, Tuscany, Italy. The centre is devoted to exhibiting art produced during the past few decades. It houses a Museum of Contemporary Art, a Centre of Information and Documentation of visual arts and an education department.

Since its first opening, in 1988, the center produced and hosted over 250 exhibitions, special events, and educational initiatives for students and adults. The museum assembled a collection of over 1000 works spanning from the 1960s to the present and hosts over 60,000 items in its CID/Arti Visive specialized archive.

== Building ==
Originally designed by architect Italo Gamberini, in 2016 it was expanded by Maurice Nio, who designed a U-shaped building with an outdoor amphitheater with a seat capacity of 800 people at the centre. The new building includes 3000 square meters of exhibition space, an archive, a library, an auditorium-cinema, a bookshop, and a restaurant. In addition to the permanent contemporary art collection, the centre includes a sculpture garden and a space designated to the installation of temporary exhibitions.

Building

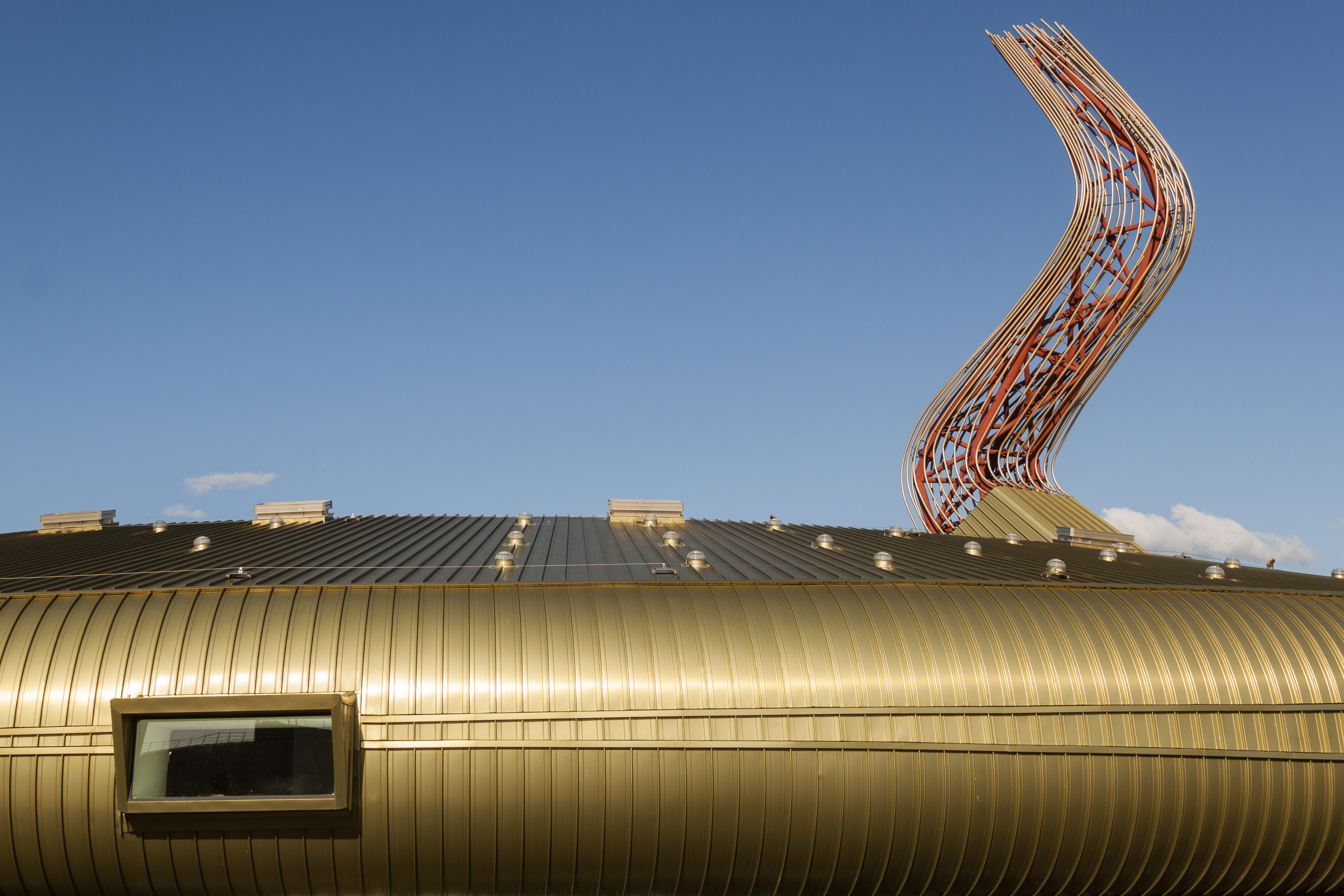
The new building

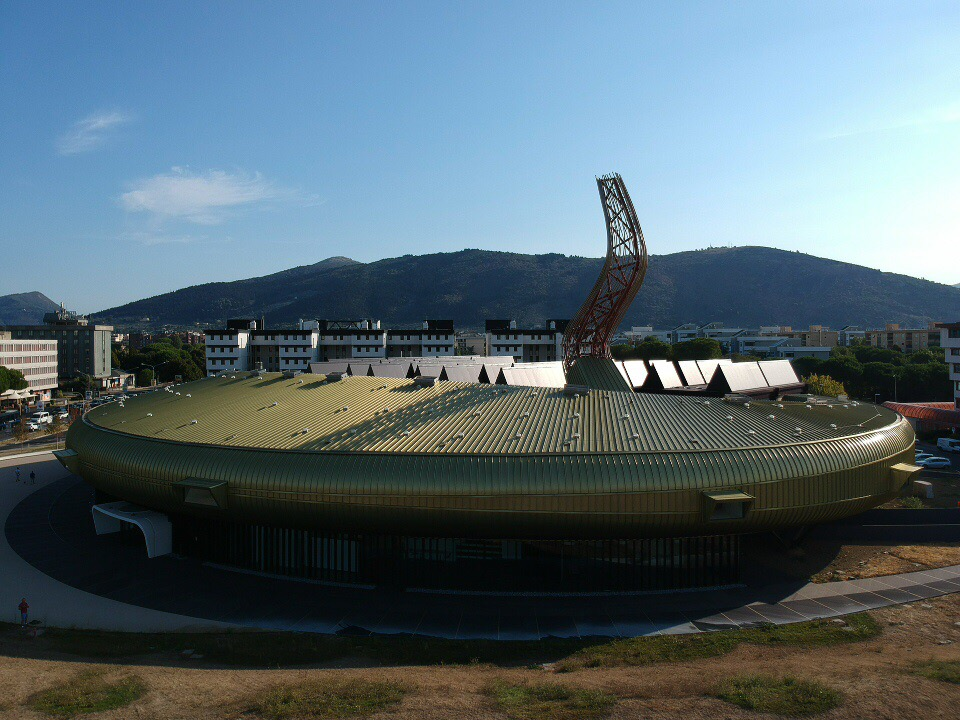
The new building under construction

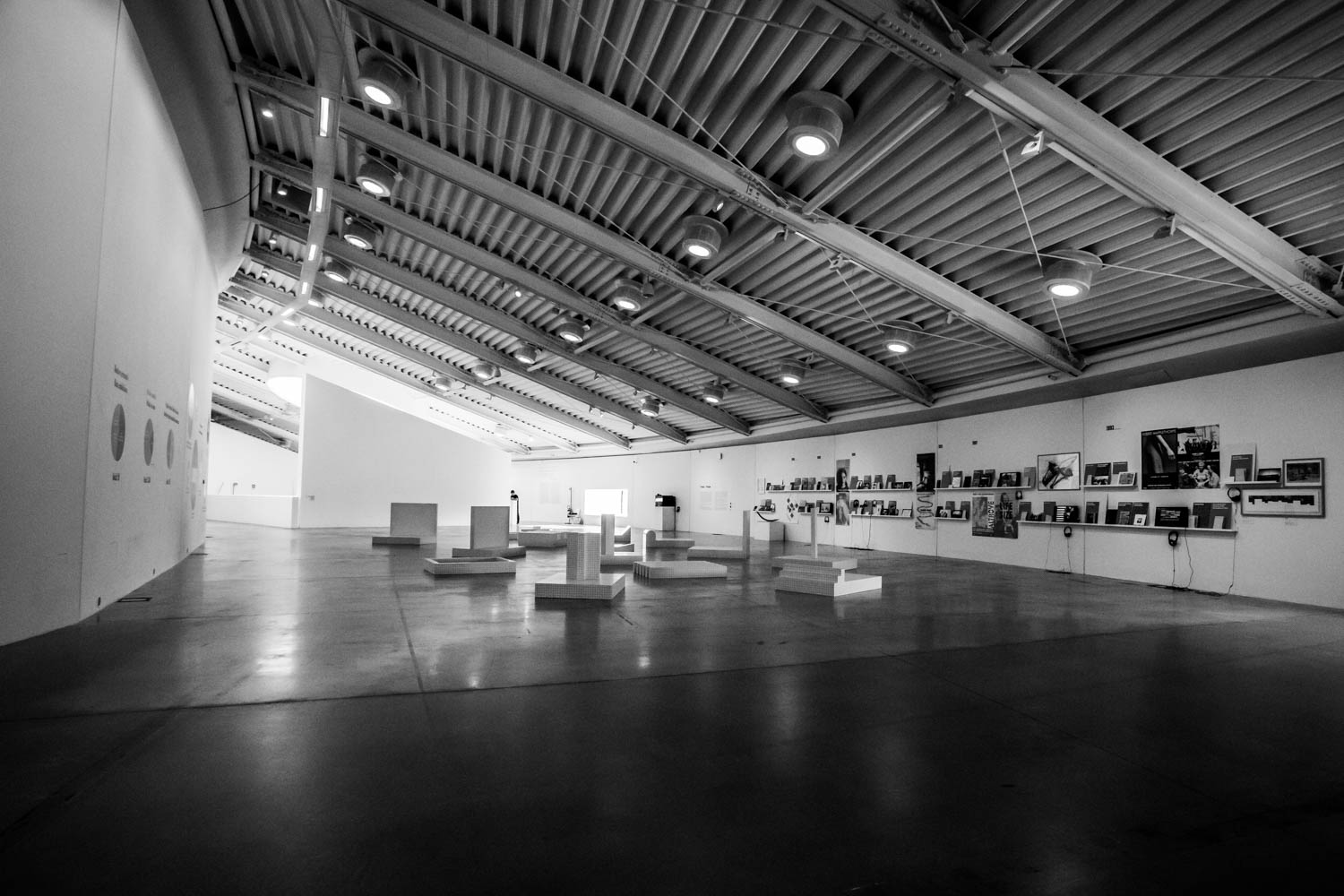
Exhibition space

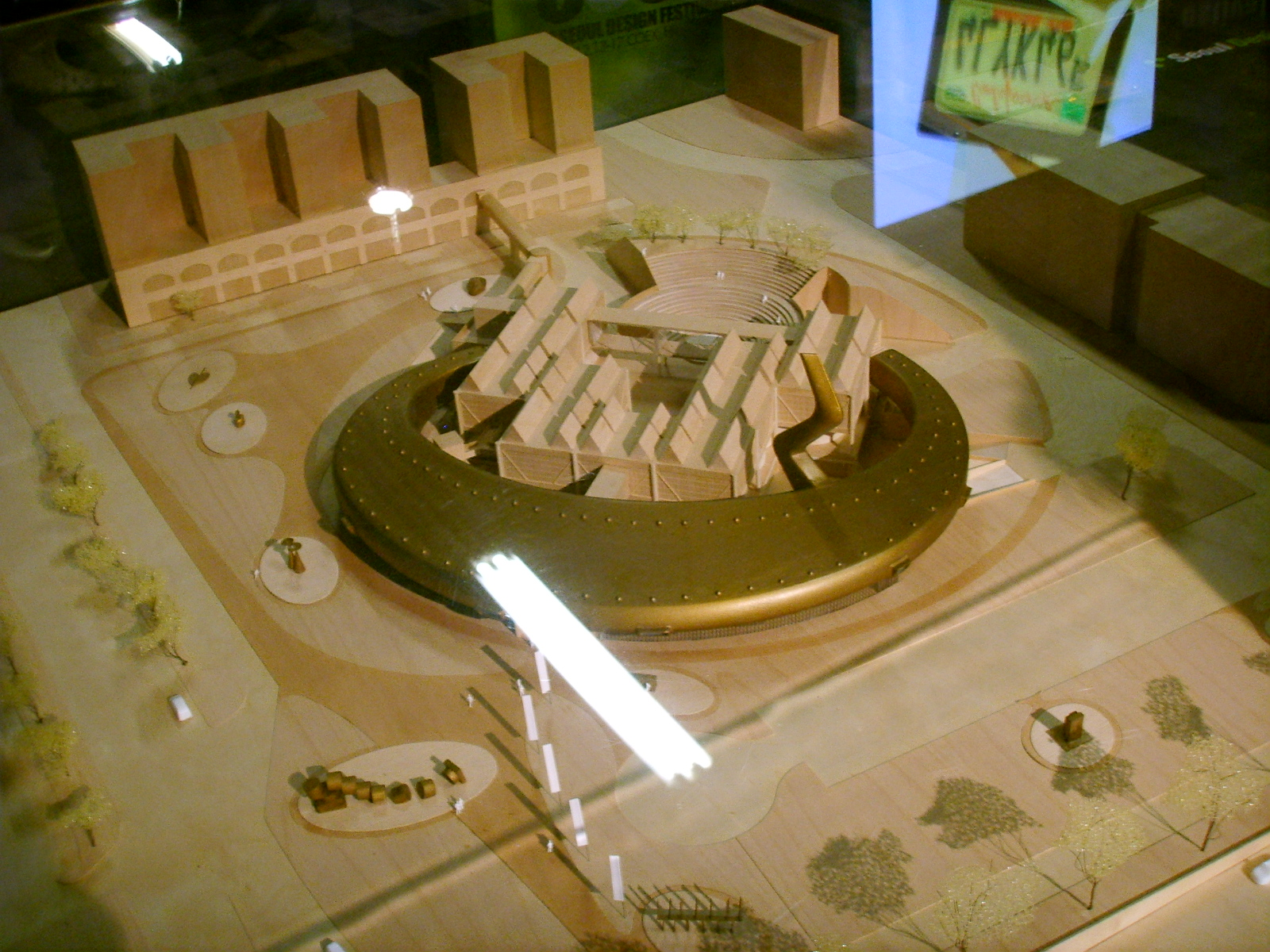
The new building - project

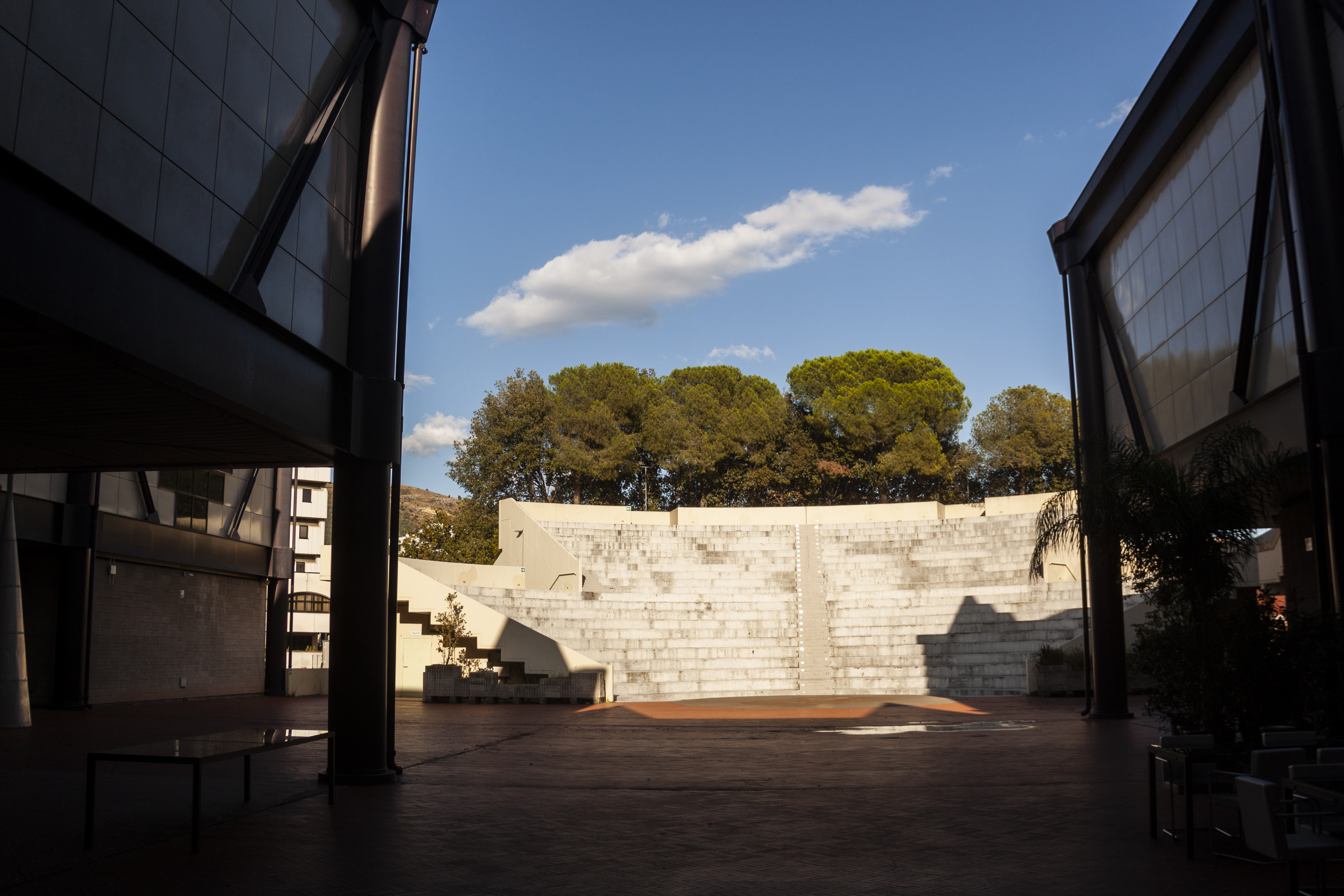
Amphitheatre

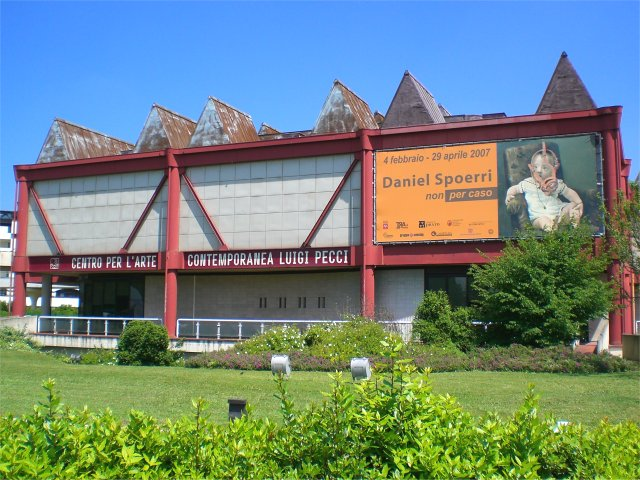
The old building

== Collection ==
The collection includes over 1000 works by more than 300 artists, among which sculptures, installations, environments, paintings and videos made from the 1950s to the present, mostly acquired as the result of the exhibitions organized by the center. The sections on Arte Povera and the Italian and international Transavanguardia are particularly thorough, as are those on the artists of the former Soviet bloc and on art photography. Several recent European pieces of art have been acquired thanks to the Friends of the Museum and the Cassa di Risparmio Bank Foundation of Prato. The collection also includes works and projects of Concrete Poetry and Visual Poetry.

The collection includes works by Vito Acconci, Nobuyoshi Araki, Stefano Arienti, Marco Bagnoli, Rossella Biscotti, Botto & Bruno, Paolo Canevari, Loris Cecchini, Enzo Cucchi, Jan Fabre, Lucio Fontana, Marco Gastini, Piero Gilardi, Dmitry Gutov, Emilio Isgrò, Ilya Kabakov, Anish Kapoor, Jannis Kounellis, Barbara Kruger, Francesco Lo Savio, Sol LeWitt, Philip-Lorca di Corcia, Eliseo Mattiacci, Fausto Melotti, Mario Merz, Liliana Moro, Robert Morris, Ugo Mulas, Bruno Munari, Vik Muniz, Maurizio Nannucci, Hermann Nitsch, Julian Opie, Anatolij Osmolovskij, Mimmo Paladino, Giulio Paolini, Gianni Pettena, Michelangelo Pistoletto, Anne e Patrick Poirier, Remo Salvadori, Julian Schnabel, Daniel Spoerri, Mauro Staccioli, Superstudio, David Tremlett, UFO, VALIE EXPORT, Massimo Vitali, Yelena & Viktor Vorobyev, Erwin Wurm, Gilberto Zorio.

== History ==
The centre was founded in 1988 by curator Amnon Barzel and industrialist Enrico Pecci in memory of his son Luigi Pecci. Contributions to the foundation of the centre were made by the Prato town council, private companies and members of the public. Stefano Collicelli Cagol has been the director of the centre since 2021.

== Directors ==
- Amnon Barzel (1986–1992)
- Ida Panicelli (1993–1994)
- Antonella Soldaini (1994–1995)
- Bruno Corà (1995–2002)
- Daniel Soutif (2003–2005)
- Stefano Pezzato (2006–2007)
- Marco Bazzini (2007–2013)
- Fabio Cavallucci (2014–2018)
- Cristina Perrella (2018–2021)
- Stefano Collicelli Cagol (2021)
