= Raffaello Brizzi =

Italian architect (1883–1946)

- Born: 4 April 1883; Montecatini Terme, Province of Florence, Kingdom of Italy
- Died: 23 February 1946 (aged 62); Montecatini Terme, Province of Pistoia, Kingdom of Italy
- Occupation: Architect

Raffaello Brizzi (4 April 1883 – 23 February 1946) was an Italian architect.

== Life and career ==
Professor of Architecture at the Academy of Fine Arts in Florence, Brizzi was among the founders of the new Royal Higher School of Architecture in Florence, where he taught architectural composition. When the Royal School transformed into the Higher Institute of Architecture, he became its Dean in March 1932, and re-confirmed in 1936 when the institute was incorporated into the University of Florence. Brizzi held this position until 1944. Among his students, Giovanni Michelucci, Italo Gamberini, and other architects who were key figures in the Modern Movement in Italy are remembered.

Mainly active in Tuscany, Brizzi designed the Town Hall in Montecatini Terme, the city master plan of Viareggio, the Florence Royal Police Headquarters on Via Zara, the project for the redevelopment of the New University Center, and the Livorno Stadium. In 1932, he was entrusted with the direction of the Technical Office for the development of the Versilia coastline.

== Works (selection) ==
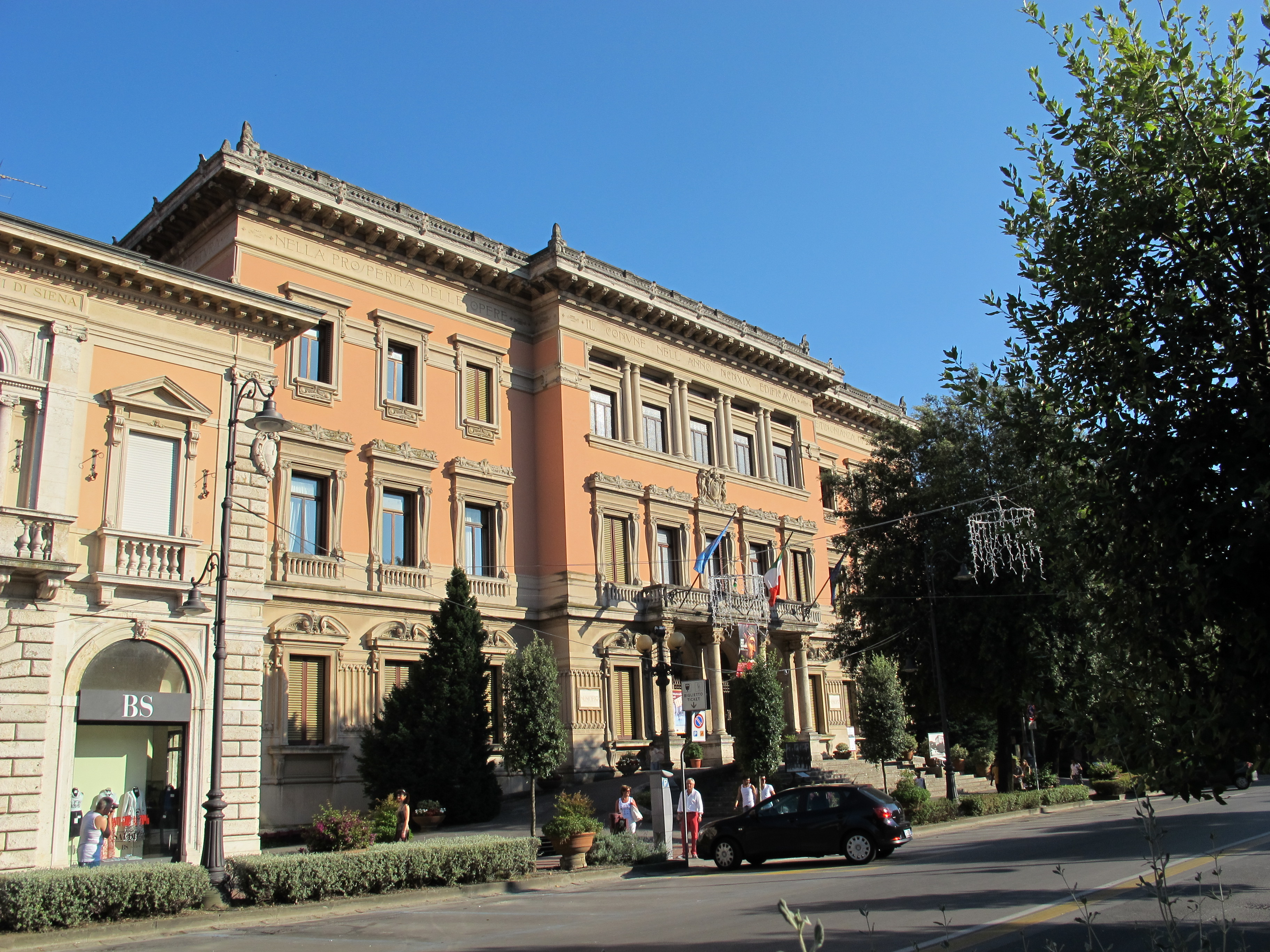
Montecatini Terme Town Hall

- Loggia dei Mercanti, Pistoia (1912–1913, demolished in 1939)
- Town Hall, Montecatini Terme (1913–1919, with Luigi Righetti)
- Bank of Rome building, Montecatini Terme
- City master plan of Viareggio
- Bagno Felice, Viareggio (1932, with E. Miniati)
- Municipal Stadium, Livorno (1933–1935)
- Royal Police Headquarters, Florence (1939–1941)
- Conservatorio Santa Maria degli Angiolini, Florence (1939–1941, restoration)

== Bibliography ==
- Elisabetta Insabato; Cecilia Ghelli, eds. (2007). Guida agli archivi di architetti e ingegneri del Novecento in Toscana. Florence: Edifir. pp. 87–94.
- Mauro Cozzi; Gabriella Carapelli, eds. (1994). Edilizia in Toscana fra le due guerre. Florence: Edifir. pp. 215–216.
- Giovanni Klaus Koenig (1968). Architettura in Toscana 1931-1968. Turin: ERI. p. 194.
