= Florence–Faenza railway =

Railway line in Italy

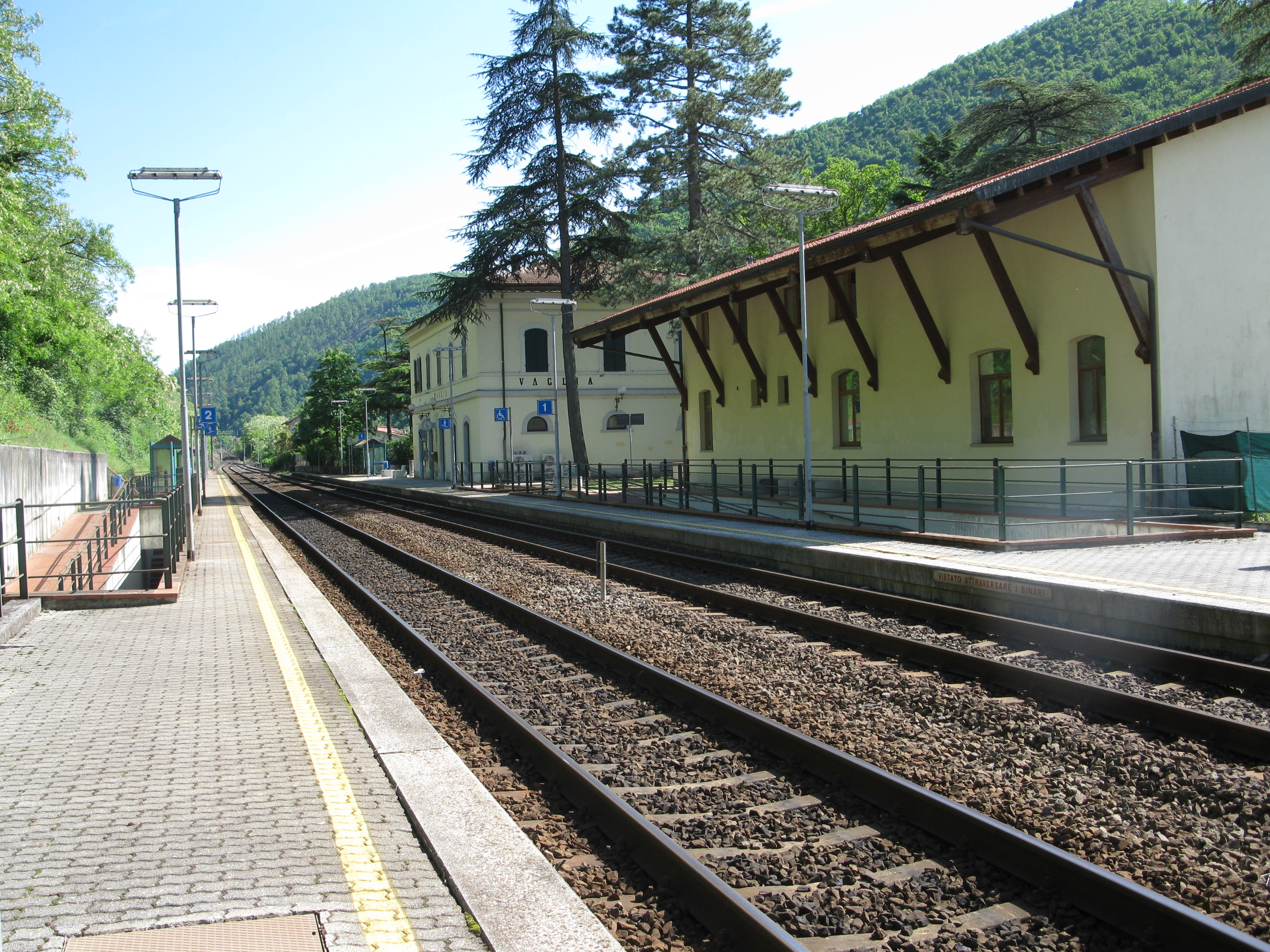
- Vaglia railway station

Overview
- Status: in use
- Owner: Rete Ferroviaria Italiana
- Line number: 93
- Locale: Emilia-Romagna and Tuscany, Italy
- Coordinates: 44°00′22″N 11°29′27″E
- Termini: Florence; Faenza

Service
- Type: Heavy rail
- Operator: Trenitalia

History
- Opened: 21 April 1893

Technical
- Line length: 101 km (63 mi)
- Number of tracks: 1
- Track gauge: 1,435 mm (4 ft 8 1/2 in) standard gauge
- Electrification: no

The Florence–Faenza railway, also known as Faentina railway, is a railway line in Italy.

== History ==
The line was opened in several sections as follows:

- Fognano–Faenza on 9 January 1887
- Marradi–Fognano on 26 August 1888
- Florence–Borgo San Lorenzo on 8 April 1890
- Borgo San Lorenzo–Marradi on 21 April 1893

During the Second World War, the railway was heavily damaged by retreating German troops on the Gothic Line which made it unsuitable for railway services until 1954. However, the services were only restored between Faenza and San Piero a Sieve, forcing the Florence-bound trains to reverse at Borgo San Lorenzo into the Borgo San Lorenzo-Pontassieve railway, with the railway services to San Piero a Sieve being withdrawn in the 1970s.

In 1999, the Faentina was entirely refurbished and the track from Borgo San Lorenzo to Florence was reopened via San Piero a Sieve, Vaglia and Fiesole.

== Current Services ==
At present days the railway is served by Regional Trains Faenza-Firenze Santa Maria Novella calling at Brisighella, Fognano, San Cassiano, San Martino in Gattara, Marradi, Biforco, Crespino del Lamone, Ronta, Borgo San Lorenzo, San Piero a Sieve, Vaglia, Fiesole-Caldine and Firenze San Marco Vecchio. Some of these trains make less stops for a faster service calling at Brisighella, Marradi, Ronta, Borgo San Lorenzo, San Piero a Sieve, Vaglia, Fiesole-Caldine and Firenze San Marco Vecchio.

There is also a daily regional train operating, except on Sundays and Public Holidays, between Ravenna and Firenze Santa Maria Novella calling at Godo, Russi, Granarolo Faentino, Faenza, Brisighella, Fognano, San Cassiano, San Martino in Gattara, Marradi, Biforco, Crespino del Lamone, Ronta, Borgo San Lorenzo, San Piero a Sieve, Vaglia, Fiesole-Caldine and Firenze San Marco Vecchio.

During the summer service, the line is also served by two Regional Trains between Firenze Santa Maria Novella and Rimini:

- R34049 Firenze Santa Maria Novella-Rimini calling at: Firenze San Marco Vecchio, Fiesole-Caldine, Vaglia, San Piero a Sieve, Borgo San Lorenzo, Ronta, Marradi, Brisighella, Faenza, Granarolo Faentino, Russi, Godo, Ravenna, Lido di Classe-Lido di Savio, Cervia-Milano Marittima, Cesenatico, Bellaria, Igea Marina and Rimini Viserba (operates on Sundays and Public Holidays)
- R34503 Firenze Santa Maria Novella-Rimini calling at: Firenze Campo Marte, Pontassieve, Rufina, Scopeti, Contea-Londa, Dicomano, Vicchio, Borgo San Lorenzo, Ronta, Crespino del Lamone, Biforco, Marradi, San Martino in Gattara, Brisighella, Faenza, Granarolo Faentino, Russi, Godo, Ravenna, Lido di Classe-Lido di Savio, Cervia-Milano Marittima, Cesenatico, Bellaria and Igea Marina (operates daily).

During October Sundays there are special trains between Florence, Rimini, Faenza and Bologna to Marradi for the Sagra delle Castagne event.

== Stations ==
At present days, the railway line has the following stations:

- Faenza (Terminus)
- Brisighella
- Fognano
- Strada Casale
- San Cassiano
- San Martino in Gattara
- Popolano di Marradi
- Marradi
- Biforco
- Crespino del Lamone
- Ronta
- Borgo San Lorenzo
- San Piero a Sieve
- Campomigliaio
- Vaglia
- Fiesole-Caldine
- Pian di Mugnone
- Firenze San Marco Vecchio
- Firenze Santa Maria Novella (Terminus)

The following stations are only served by 4 train services a day:

- Strada Casale
- Popolano di Marradi
- Campomigliaio (together with some Borgo San Lorenzo-Firenze Campo Marte trains).

The railway station of Pian di Mugnone is only served by a few trains a day between Borgo San Lorenzo and Firenze Campo Marte

The following stations have been dismissed:

- Sant'Eufemia di Brisighella
- Panicaglia
- Fontebuona
- Cercina
- Montorsoli (converted into a signalling control)
- Mimmole
- Salviati

== See also ==
- List of railway lines in Italy
