= Ospedale Bonifacio =

Insane Asylum in Florence, Italy

Coordinates: 43.78123°N 11.25966°E

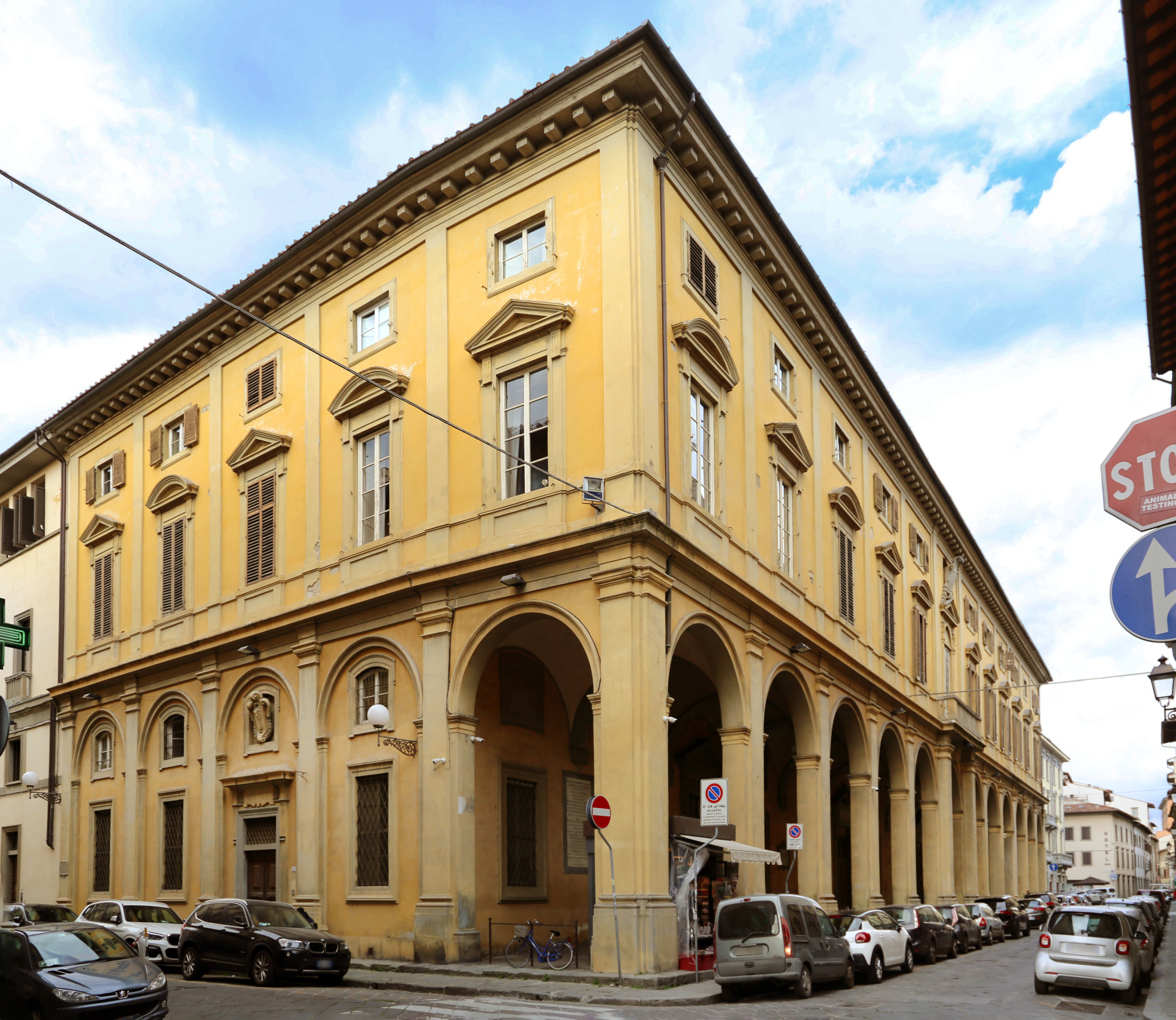
Facade on Via San Gallo

The Ospedale Bonifacio was, until 1924, the insane asylum of Florence, Italy. The main facade is located on #81-83 via San Gallo, between via Duca d'Aosta and via Bonifazio Lupi; the hospital complex spanned an entire city block. In 1930, the building was restructured and now mainly serves as the police station or Palazzo della Questura.

The hospital was founded at this site in 1377 by the family of Bonifazio (Bonifacio) Lupi. It was initially dedicated St John the Baptist. By 1782, the institute was staffed by a female oblate order. In 1787, Peter Leopold consolidated various facilities housing the incurable invalids and demented and housed them at this site. In 1924, many were moved to the Ospedale di Careggi.

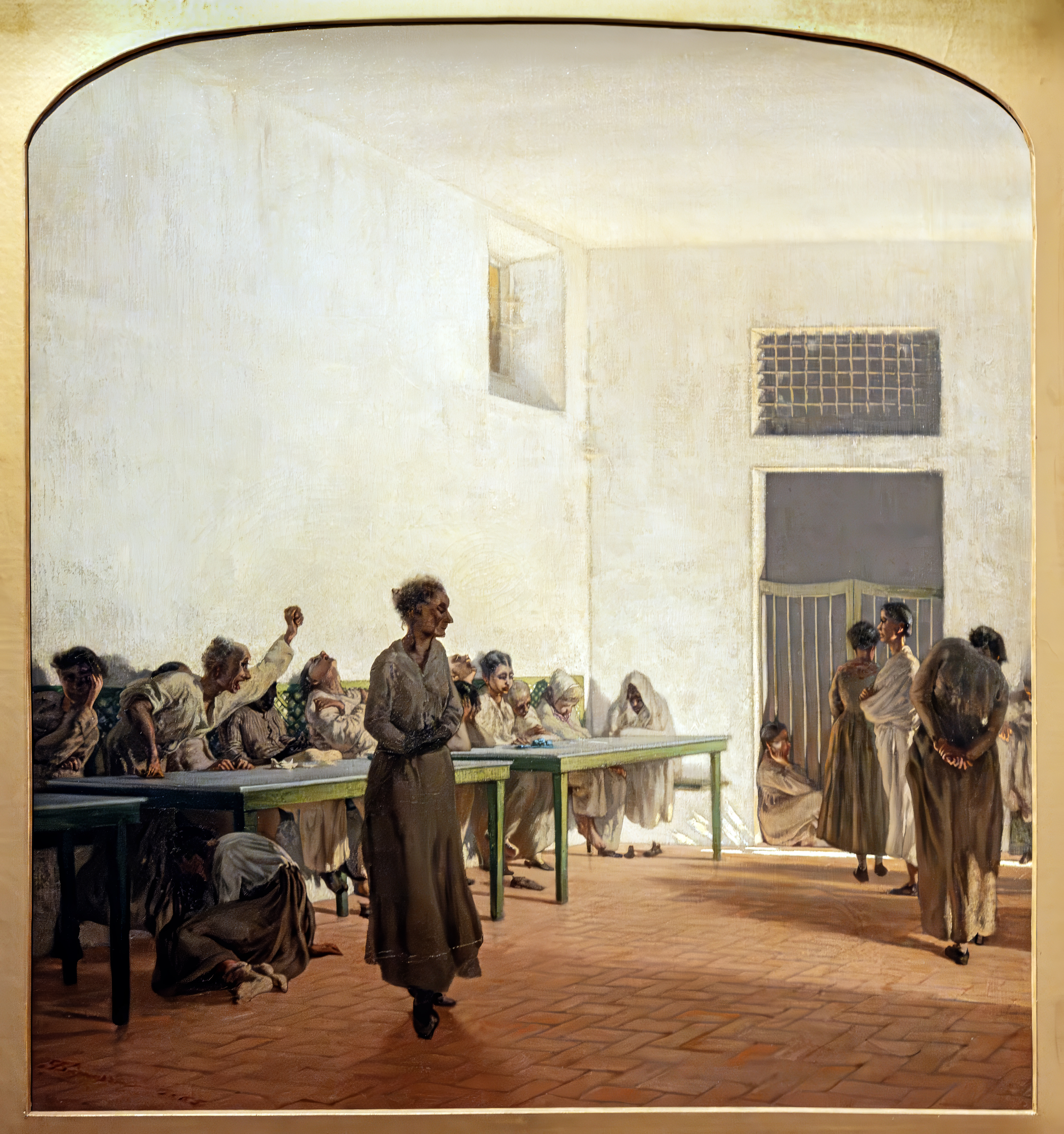
Ward of the agitated mad-women of San Bonifacio by Telemaco Signorini.
