= Chiesa dell'Autostrada del Sole, Campi Bisenzio =

Roman Catholic church in Florence, Italy

Coordinates: 43°49′54.01″N 11°09′25.00″E

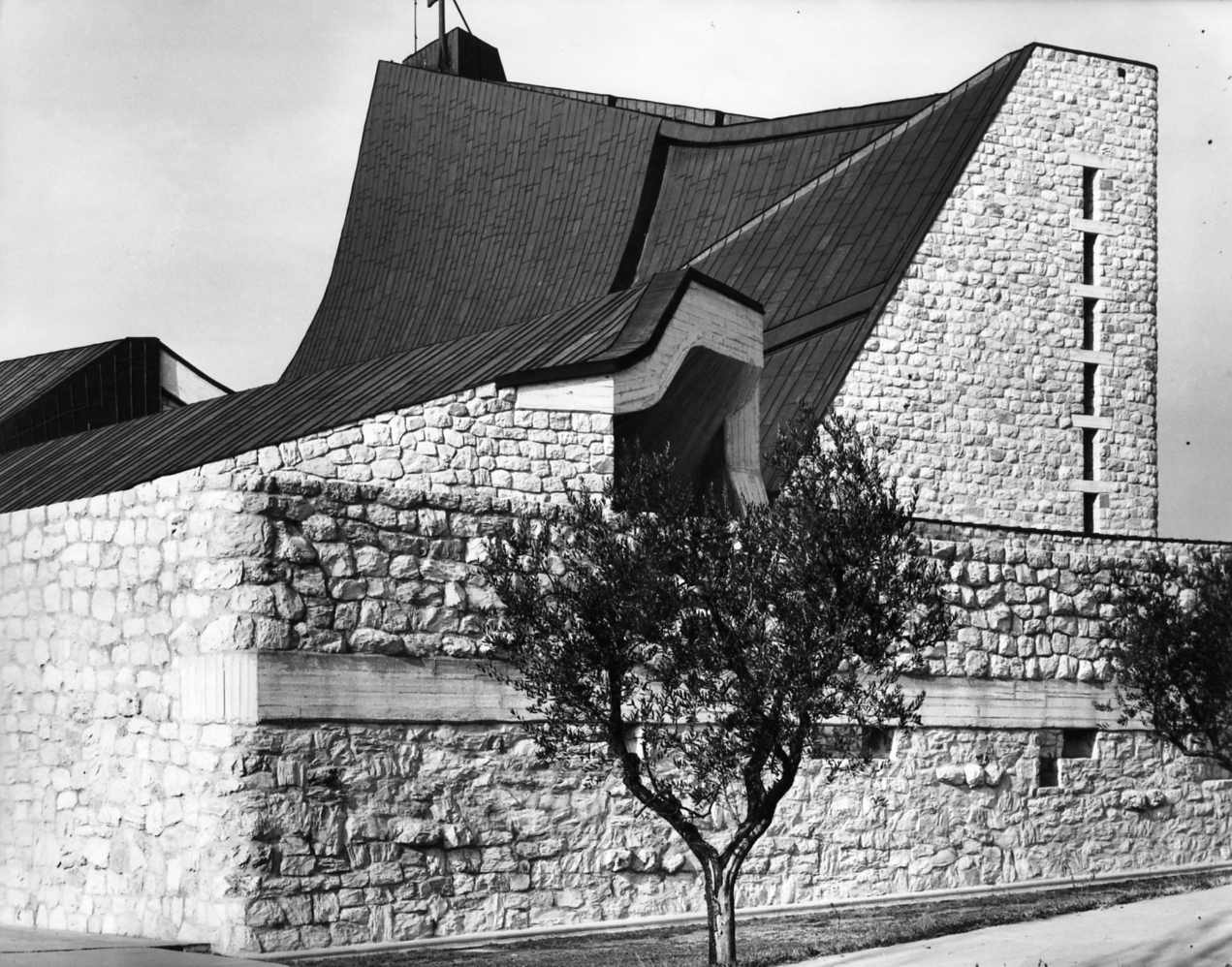
The church photographed by Paolo Monti in 1977

The Church of San Giovanni Battista or Chiesa dell'Autostrada del Sole is a church in Campi Bisenzio, near Florence, Italy, within a large motorway rest area shared between two autostrada roads. It can also be reached on foot from a local road outside the autostrada system.

The church is formally named after John the Baptist but has also earned the name Church of the Freeway of the Sun for its location between autostrada del Sole (Freeway of the Sun) and the A11 Firenze-Mare highway.

The design of the church is meant to reflect both modern and traditional church designs. The "cross" floor plan and stone facing are meant to evoke a traditional feel, while the tent-like vertical elements and copper roofing reflect modern design tastes. The church stands 27.5 meters (90 feet) high.

It was built between 1960 and 1963, based on plans by Giovanni Michelucci. The materials used for the building are stone and concrete for the walls; copper for the roof, oxidized to green on the outside; and burnished blond on the inside. Marble, glass, and bronze are used for the interior elements. The floorplan of the building is asymmetrical and follows sinuous curves creating a feeling of fluid space. The church is decorated with works of Marcello Avenali, Jorio Vivarelli, Dilvo Lotti, and Luigi Venturini.

The intention of the church builders was to honor the workers who had died during construction of the freeway and to provide a "parish for the tourists" so those who were travelling could have a place to worship.

The Autostrada del Sole is a reflection of two great societal changes of the 1960s, a society moving towards a more mobile and itinerant culture and the new religious ideas brought forward in the Second Vatican Council pronouncements.

I have visited Giovanni Michelucci's Church of the Autostrada (...), and I now realize it is an extremely beautiful and effective building.

— Robert Venturi
