= Pier Niccolò Berardi =

Italian architect (1904–1989)

- Born: 3 October 1904; Fiesole, Province of Florence, Kingdom of Italy
- Died: 2 January 1989 (aged 84); Florence, Italy
- Education: University of Rome La Sapienza
- Occupation: Architect

Pier Niccolò Berardi (3 October 1904 – 2 January 1989) was an Italian architect.

== Life and career ==
Berardi, from a family of entrepreneurs in the wood and steel industry in Piedmont, graduated in architecture in Rome in 1928. He collaborated with the Gruppo Toscano led by Giovanni Michelucci, winning the competition for the new Florence Santa Maria Novella station.

In 1936, he exhibited photographs of Tuscan houses at the Milan Triennial, highlighting his interest for rural architecture. During the 1930s and 1940s, he worked on projects for the Ministry of Foreign Affairs and for the renovation of diplomatic residences in Europe, including Bucharest and Tirana.

After the war, he mainly focused on private residential construction, collaborating with Studio San Giorgio and designing houses, villas, and structures such as clubhouses for golf courses and museums. In 1964, he built the church of San Bernardino in Fiesole, his only religious work. In 1966, he left the studio to dedicate himself to painting, but later resumed designing villas and furnishings, favoring an architecture integrated with the natural environment, with works between 1967 and 1986 including Villa Nasi in Castiglione Torinese, Villa Pellicciotti in Saint-Paul-de-Vence, Villa Settepassi in Roccamare, and renovations of villas in various Tuscan locations.

== Sources ==
- Pier Niccolò Berardi architetto. Milan: Mondadori. 1988.
- Pier Niccolò Berardi architetto e pittore. Florence: Giunti. 2013.
- Fanelli, Giovanni; Mazza, Barbara (1999). La casa colonica in Toscana. Le fotografie di Pier Niccolò Berardi alla Triennale del 1936. Florence: Octavo.
- Ghelli, Cecilia (2007). "Pier Niccolò Berardi". In Elisabetta Insabato; Cecilia Ghelli (eds.). Guida agli archivi di architetti e ingegneri del Novecento in Toscana. Florence: Edifir. pp. 60–64.
