= Giovanni Michelucci =

Italian architect (1891-1990)

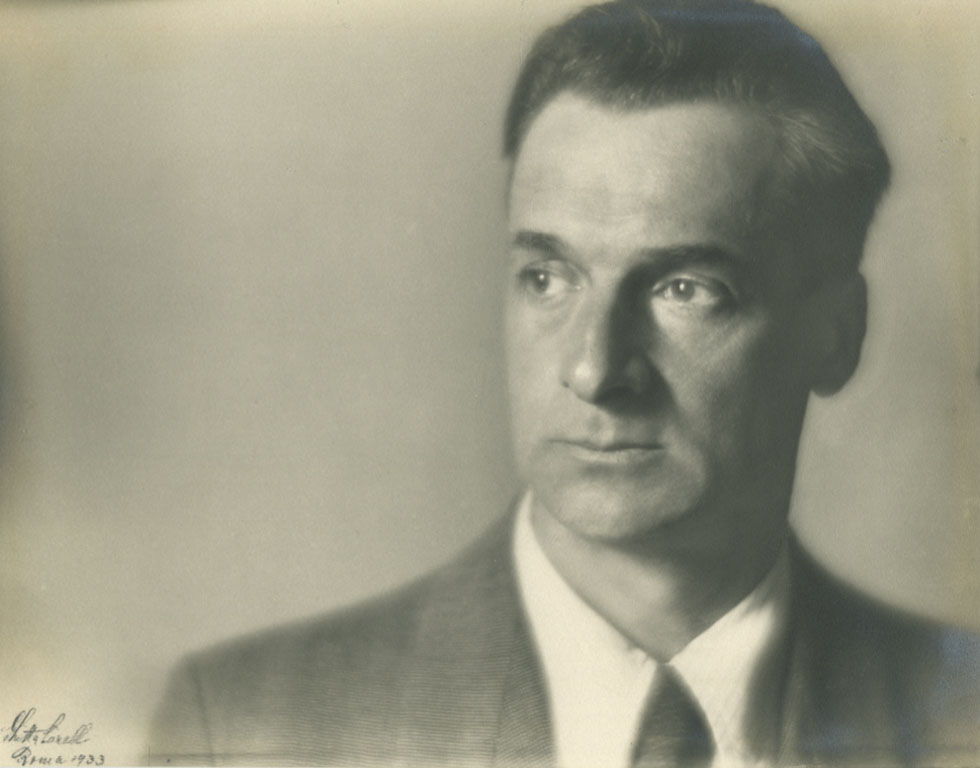
- Michelucci in Rome, 1933
- Born: 2 January 1891; Pistoia, Tuscany, Italy
- Died: 31 December 1990 (aged 99); Fiesole, Tuscany, Italy
- Occupation: Architect
- Buildings: Firenze Santa Maria Novella railway station San Giovanni Battista church on the Autostrada del Sole

Giovanni Michelucci (2 January 1891 – 31 December 1990) was an Italian architect, urban planner, and designer. He is known for projects such as the Firenze Santa Maria Novella railway station and the San Giovanni Battista church on the Autostrada del Sole.

== Biography ==
Michelucci was born in Pistoia, Tuscany, on 2 January 1891. His family owned an iron workshop which was patronized by several architects in the region.

He attended the Higher Institute of Architecture of Florence (now part of the University of Florence), graduating in 1911. In 1914 he was licensed as a professor of architectural design and began teaching at the institute. He eventually became Dean of the Faculty of Architecture there in 1944.

During World War I, Michelucci built his first architectural work: a chapel on the eastern front in Casale Ladra, near Caporetto (today in Slovenia). He later worked on the reconstruction of the center of Florence after the Second World War, the church at Longarone after the tragedy of Vajont dam, and the plan for the popular Santa Croce district in Florence after the 1966 flood of the Arno.

Michelucci died on the night of 31 December 1990 at age 99 (two days before his 100th birthday) at his home and studio in Fiesole, now the headquarters of his Foundation.

== 1918–1945 ==
After World War I he left Pistoia and the family's "Officine Michelucci" and moved to Rome. He met Eloisa Pacini, a refined painter and pianist, also from Pistoia, who belonged to the same artistic milieu where Michelucci played an important role in intellectual culture. They married in 1928, sharing a strong social awareness during their life together. Life in Rome was experienced as an extraordinary opportunity to study the architecture of the holy city and to build new work experience.

His ability to focus on relationships with contemporary needs was recognized in 1933 when, as coordinator of the Gruppo Toscano (Tuscan Group) with Nello Baroni, Pier Niccolò Berardi, Italo Gamberini, Sarre Guarnieri, and Leonardo Lusanna, he gained first prize in the architectural contest for the Santa Maria Novella new railway station in Florence with a work that won international acclaim not only for its rational and functional qualities but also for the quality of its integration into the historical and urban context. He reaffirmed the value of attention to architectural history and the desire to escape from rhetorical excitement, which was thought to represent an era, confronting modern architectural challenges removed from the feeling of conforming to a current architecture or blindly tied to one style. Between December '45 and January '46 he founded the magazine "La Nuova Città". In that period, from observing the bomb rubble of the destroyed center of Florence, he produced firm ideas and plans for the reconstruction of the area around Ponte Vecchio. These concepts for innovative spaces clashed with the award-winning, elitist trend of reconstruction "like it was where it was" that would deliver a series of historical fakes responsible for the future museification of the city.

== 1945–1990 ==
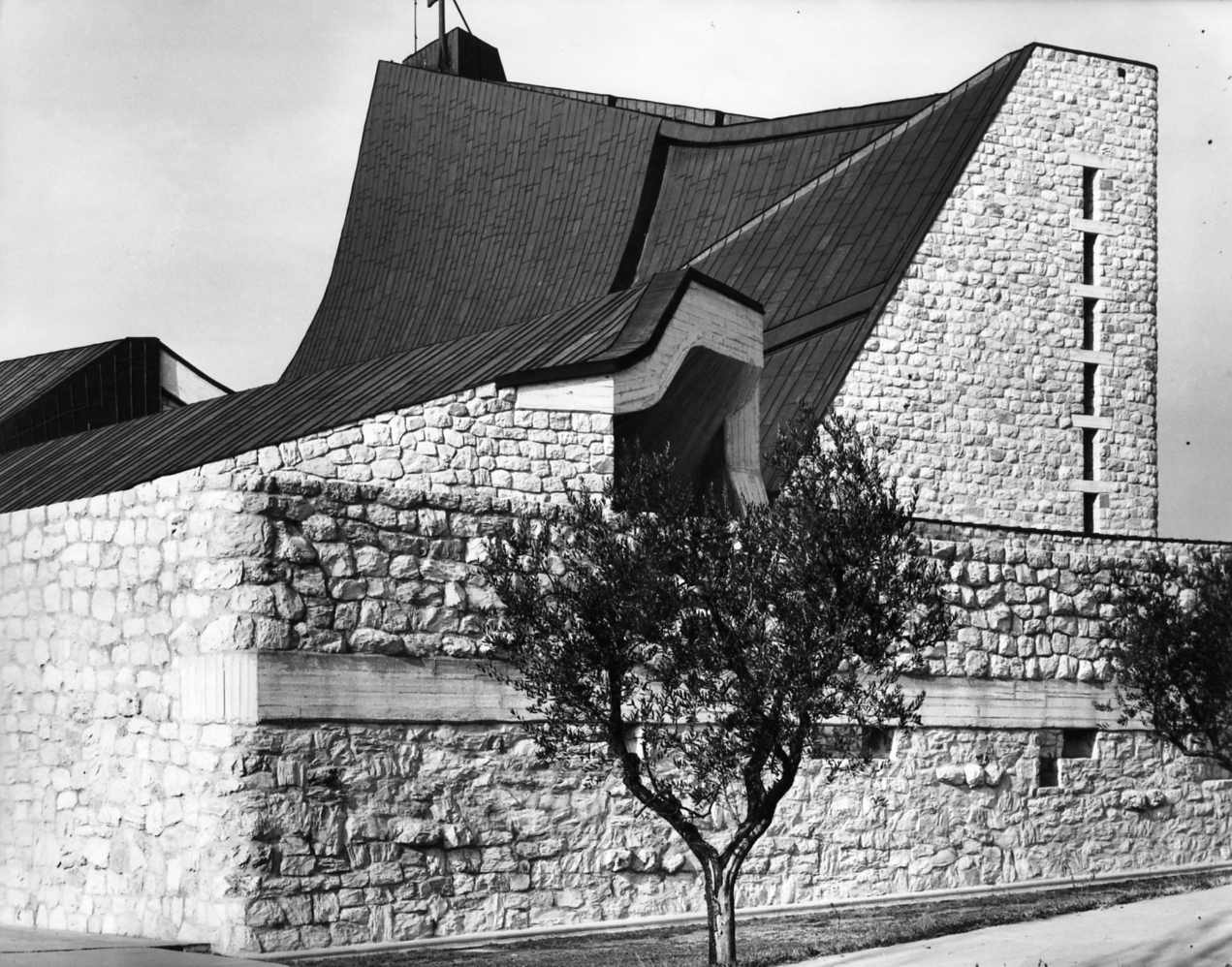
The church of San Giovanni Battista, Highway A11, called "Church of the Motorway" (1960-64) photographed by Paolo Monti

Michelucci's thesis was innovative but not accepted, this defeat heavily influencing his teaching at the Faculty of Architecture, where he was now Dean. In fact, in 1948, Michelucci left the Faculty in Florence, and became a professor at the Faculty of Engineering in Bologna, where he remained until the conclusion of his teaching activity and where he found a more fertile ground for the development of his themes.

The first turning point work after the war, a small church in the countryside of Pistoia, is a manifesto against the fashionable rhetoric and focused on the human dimension, using the language of rural architecture in order to restore the main religious and civil meeting center of a small and poor community, marking definitively the real role of architecture in the service of his idea of "The New City".

Many later works included social housing, workers' villages, public buildings, banks, churches, museum, social spaces for prisons, hospitals, schools and other projects, always developed around the idea of a friendly, supportive, democratic community-city, where architecture is open to the city, people-oriented and far from disciplinary boundaries of styles and languages.

Sadly leaving the university because of his age, he dedicated his work to rigorous research with which he prepared, singularly but not limited to, a new revolution in the language of architecture: the concept of space wherever accessible, variety, the refusal of formulaic and technocratic diagrams, a new relation between ancient and modern, which was also expressed through combining stones, bricks, concrete, steel, glass and new materials used architecturally, but mainly in a symbolic way.

During the '60s, with the church of San Giovanni Battista, Highway A11, called "Church of the Motorway", near Florence and the Church in the San Marino Republic, Michelucci fulfilled his earlier premises and completed his revolutionary designs, based on a search for the uniqueness between structure and architecture, with space developed as an architectural path.

== Michelucci Foundation ==
In 1982 the architect, with Regione Toscana and the cities of Fiesole and Pistoia, decided to establish the "Fondazione Giovanni Michelucci" which he guided until his demise. He bequeathed his vision and values to the Foundation, that he wanted to be attentive to the social problems of the city and to the separate worlds of total institutions as prison, asylum, hospitals. He committed the Foundation to offering ideas and plans for action on the chronic urban question, how to reconnect separate spaces by a new design of the city, giving witness to a way of life and to making architecture meet the needs of the people. The Foundation now also conserves his archives, his works, his writings, his ideal heritage. The Michelucci Foundation was established to "contribute to research and study on city planning and modern and contemporary architecture, with a special attention to the problems regarding social facilities, hospitals, prisons, schools". Today, the Michelucci Foundation is a relevant and innovative actor in research and planning on social habitat and on the relationship between space and society. The Foundation coordinates several projects and researches in partnership with local authorities and cultural institutions, developing programs and proposals to integrate the local policies on the most relevant urban problems: migration, housing exclusion, suburbs, urban security, health.
