= Francesco Tiezzi =

Italian architect and urban planner (1922–2017)

- Born: 24 November 1922; Torrita di Siena, Kingdom of Italy
- Died: March 2017 (aged 94)
- Education: University of Florence
- Occupations: Architect, urban planner

Francesco Tiezzi (24 November 1922 – March 2017) was an Italian architect and urban planner active mainly in Tuscany, where he designed residential, educational, and sports buildings, and contributed to several urban development projects.

== Life and career ==
Born in Torrita di Siena, Tiezzi studied architecture at the University of Florence, graduating in 1948 under Giovanni Michelucci. After serving briefly during World War II and participating in the Italian resistance movement, he joined the INA-Casa programme in 1949.

In the early 1950s he collaborated with Sirio Pastorini, Mario Pellegrini, and Ferdinando Poggi on the master plan for the new Isolotto neighbourhood in Florence, where he also designed residential buildings and the Montagnola primary school.

Throughout his career Tiezzi worked extensively for the Municipality of Florence, designing schools, social centres, swimming pools, sports halls and other public facilities. His projects include the Centro Tecnico Federale Luigi Ridolfi at Coverciano, the Paolo Costoli sports complex, the Visarno Hippodrome, and several municipal sports centres across Tuscany.

== Selected works ==
- Isolotto neighbourhood, Florence, with Sirio Pastorini, Mario Pellegrini and Ferdinando Poggi (1950–1956)
- Montagnola primary school, Isolotto, Florence (1950s–1963)
- Palazzo dello Sport (now part of the Paolo Costoli sports complex), Florence, with Alberto Paoli and Giuseppe Liverani (1950s)
- Centro Tecnico Federale di Coverciano, Florence, with Arnaldo Degli Innocenti (1953–1958)
- Residential buildings in Borgo San Jacopo, Florence (1950s)
- Visarno Hippodrome redevelopment, Florence (1960s)
- Swimming pool Le Pavoniere, Florence, with Emanuele Marcelli (1966)
- Municipal sports hall, Poggio a Caiano (1979)
- Municipal sports hall, Impruneta (1979)
- Municipal sports hall, San Casciano in Val di Pesa (1980)
- Palestra Valenti, Florence (1985)
- Municipal sports hall, Montelupo Fiorentino (1985)

== Sources ==
- Ariani, Lisa; Marcetti, Corrado; Poli, Daniela (2009). Fondazione Giovanni Michelucci (ed.). Francesco Tiezzi architetto. Torrita di Siena.
- Ariani, Lisa; Poli, Daniela (2024). Isolotto. Nascita di un quartiere, di una comunità e di un'idea di abitare solidale. Florence: All'Insegna del Giglio.
- Insabato, Elisabetta; Ghelli, Cecilia (2007). Guida agli archivi di architetti e ingegneri del Novecento in Toscana. Florence: Edifir.
- Poli, Daniela (2004). Storie di quartiere. La vicenda INA-Casa nel villaggio Isolotto a Firenze. Florence: Polistampa.
