= Leonardo Savioli =

Italian architect (1917–1982)

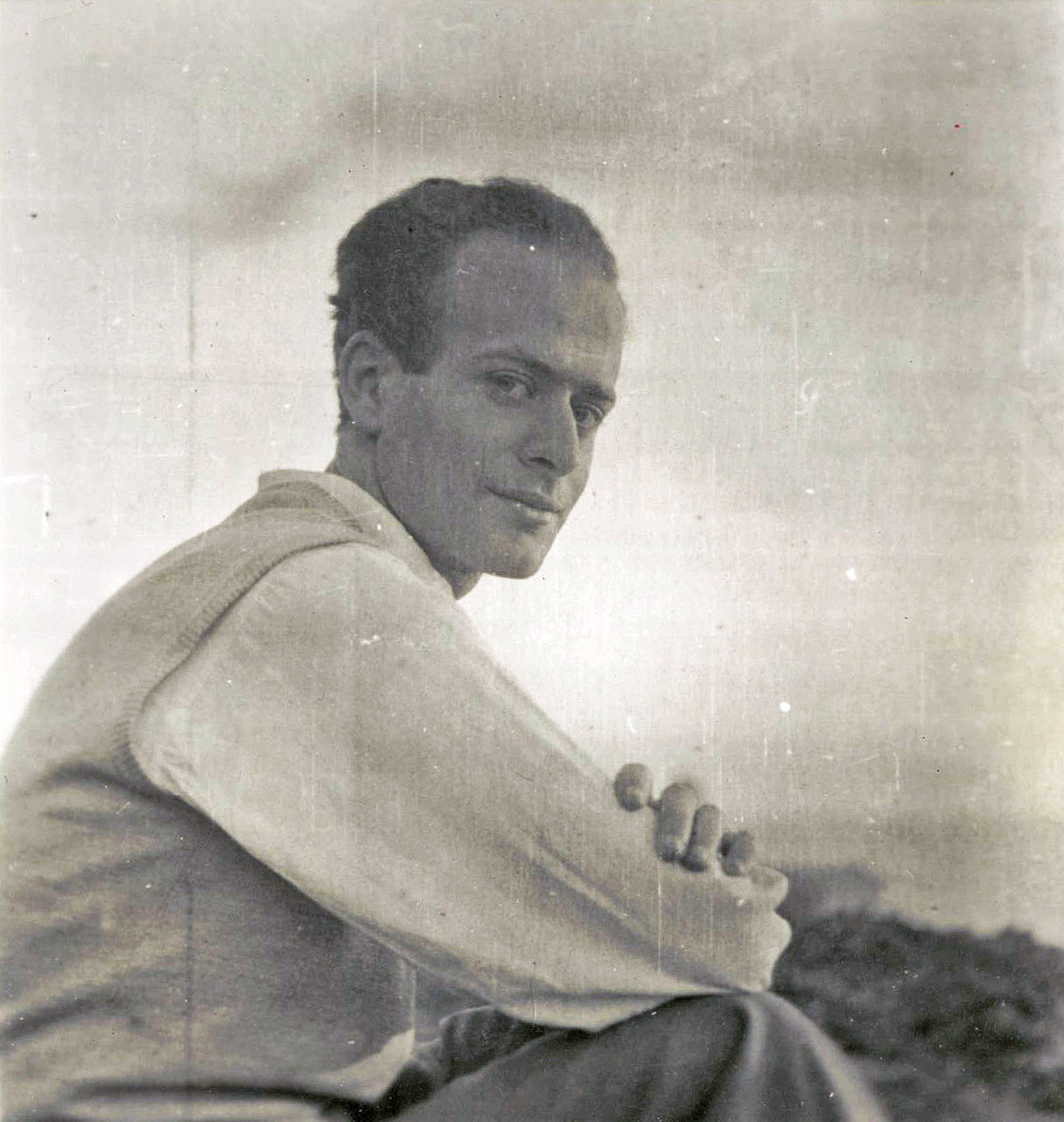
- Savioli in 1940
- Born: 30 March 1917; Florence, Kingdom of Italy
- Died: 11 May 1982 (aged 65); Florence, Italy
- Education: University of Florence
- Occupations: Architect, painter

Leonardo Savioli (30 March 1917 – 11 May 1982) was an Italian architect and painter.

== Life and career ==
Savioli was born in Florence in 1917. In 1935, he completed his classical studies and enrolled in the Faculty of Architecture at the University of Florence.

In 1941, he graduated with a thesis supervised by Giovanni Michelucci and became one of the leading figures of the so-called "Tuscan School", starting with his collaboration with Giuseppe Giorgio Gori and Leonardo Ricci. They most notably designed the Flower Market of Pescia in 1948, which earned him the first prize at the 2nd Biennale of the São Paulo Museum of Art in 1953.

During the Reconstruction years, he designed bridges and city master plans, including that of Florence (1949–1951). In 1950, he married artist Flora Wiechmann.

Savioli died in Florence in 1982 and is buried in the Allori Cemetery.

== Works (selection) ==
- Mercato dei Fiori (Flower Market), Pescia (1948–1951, with Emilio Brizzi, Enzo Gori, Giuseppe Giorgio Gori, and Leonardo Ricci)
- Florence Masterplan (1949–1951, with Lando Bartoli, Edoardo Detti, Sirio Pastorini, Giuseppe Sagrestani)
- Casa Savioli in Galluzzo, Florence (1950–1952)
- Villa Torelli in Bellosguardo, Florence (1954)
- Prato Masterplan (1956–1958)
- Sorgane Housing, Florence (1957–1963)
- Villa Sandroni, Arezzo (1962–1964)
- Villa Taddei, Florence (1964, with Danilo Santi)
- Villa Bayon in San Gaggio, Florence (1965–1972)
- Residential Building in Via Piagentina, Florence (1964–1967, with Danilo Santi)
- Ponte Giovanni da Verrazzano, Florence (1967–1970, with Carlo Damerini and Vittorio Scalesse)
