= Carlo Chiappi =

Italian architect (1939–2001)

- Born: 16 April 1939; Florence, Kingdom of Italy
- Died: 2001 (aged 61–62); Fiesole, Province of Florence, Tuscany, Italy
- Education: University of Florence
- Occupation: Architect

Carlo Chiappi (16 April 1939 – 2001) was an Italian architect.

== Life and career ==
Chiappi graduated in architecture from the University of Florence in 1967, under the mentorship of Giuseppe Giorgio Gori. Together with Rosario Vernuccio, he started collaborating with Gori's studio, primarily focusing on school architecture. He most notably designed the Pirandello schools complex in Cintoia (1968–1971), and the elementary school in Borgo San Lorenzo, with Vernuccio and Franco Bonaiuti (1979). In 1968, with Vernuccio, he designed the Pancani house in Signa.

Alongside his professional activity, Chiappi was involved in teaching at the Faculty of Architecture in Florence, where he became a full assistant in 1973 and an associate professor of architectural composition in 1981. He began an academic collaboration with Gianfranco Caniggia.

From 1984, he mainly engaged in design activities through architecture competitions: notable examples include those for the expansion of the Casino of Campione d'Italia (1983), for Palazzo Venier dei Leoni in Venice (Third International Architecture Exhibition, 1985), and for the Parterre of Piazza della Libertà in Florence (12th Milan Triennial, 1987).

From 1990 to 1995, he served as municipal councillor and the urban planning assessor for the municipality of Fiesole. From 1997 to 2001, he was the director of the Department of Design at the Faculty of Architecture in Florence.

In the final years of his career, he dedicated himself primarily to projects involving building replacement in the former Santa Teresa prison complex in Florence and to the reconstruction project of the historic center of Bientina, in the province of Pisa.

== Sources ==
- "Qualità e regola. Appunti e disegni dai quaderni di Carlo Chiappi". AIÓN. Rivista internazionale di architettura (4): 128–135. September 2003.
- Andrea Aleardi; Corrado Marcetti, eds. (2011). L'architettura in Toscana dal 1945 ad oggi. Una guida alla selezione delle opere di rilevante interesse storico-artistico. Florence: Alinea.
- Giulia Chiappi, ed. (2006). Carlo Chiappi architetto. Misura, qualità e regola nella costruzione del progetto. Florence: Alinea.
- Fabio Fabbrizzi (2008). Opere e progetti di scuola fiorentina, 1968-2008. Florence: Alinea.
- Elisabetta Insabato; Cecilia Ghelli, eds. (2007). Guida agli archivi di architetti e ingegneri del Novecento in Toscana. Florence: Edifir. pp. 126–129.
