= INA-Casa =

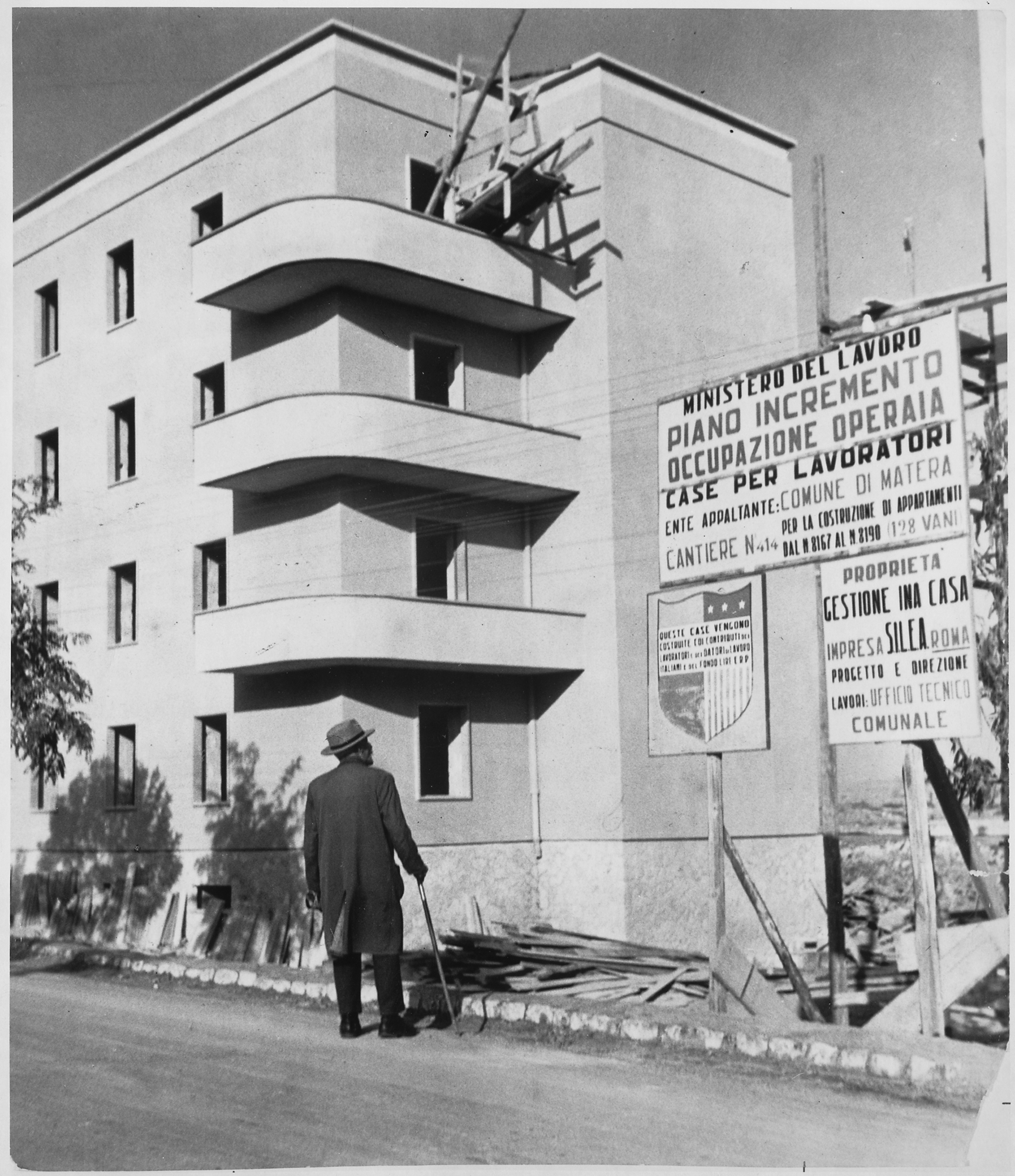
INA-Casa in Matera

INA-Casa (also known as the Fanfani Plan) was an Italian public housing programme active from 1949 to 1963. Promoted by minister of Labour Amintore Fanfani, it was designed to reduce unemployment while providing affordable housing in the aftermath of World War II. The programme was administered by the Istituto Nazionale delle Assicurazioni (INA) through the INA-Casa Management.

Initially established by Law No. 43 of 28 February 1949 for a seven-year period, the programme was extended until 1963. It combined Keynesian-inspired employment policies with social housing, financing the construction of approximately 355,000 dwellings in more than 5,000 Italian municipalities.

Many of Italy's leading architects and urban planners participated in the programme. Through design competitions and a special register of INA-Casa architects, the scheme involved about one third of all practicing Italian architects and engineers, providing an important opportunity for both established and younger professionals. The best-known participants included Adalberto Libera, Mario Ridolfi, Ludovico Quaroni, Carlo Aymonino, Franco Albini, Ignazio Gardella, Luigi Figini, Gino Pollini, and the BBPR group.

Among the most notable INA-Casa developments are the Tiburtino district in Rome, designed by Ridolfi and Quaroni and regarded as a landmark of Italian Neorealist architecture, the Tuscolano district in Rome by Quaroni and Libera, the Isolotto neighbourhood in Florence by Pastorini, Pellegrini, Poggi and Tiezzi, and the Harar housing estate in Milan by Figini, Pollini and Gio Ponti.

== Sources ==
- Di Biagi, Paola, ed. (2001). La grande ricostruzione. Il Piano Ina-Casa e l'Italia degli anni '50. Rome: Donzelli.
- Ottonelli, Omar, ed. (2013). Il piano Fanfani INA-Casa: una risposta ancora attuale. Florence: Polistampa.
