= Sorgane =

- Neighbourhood
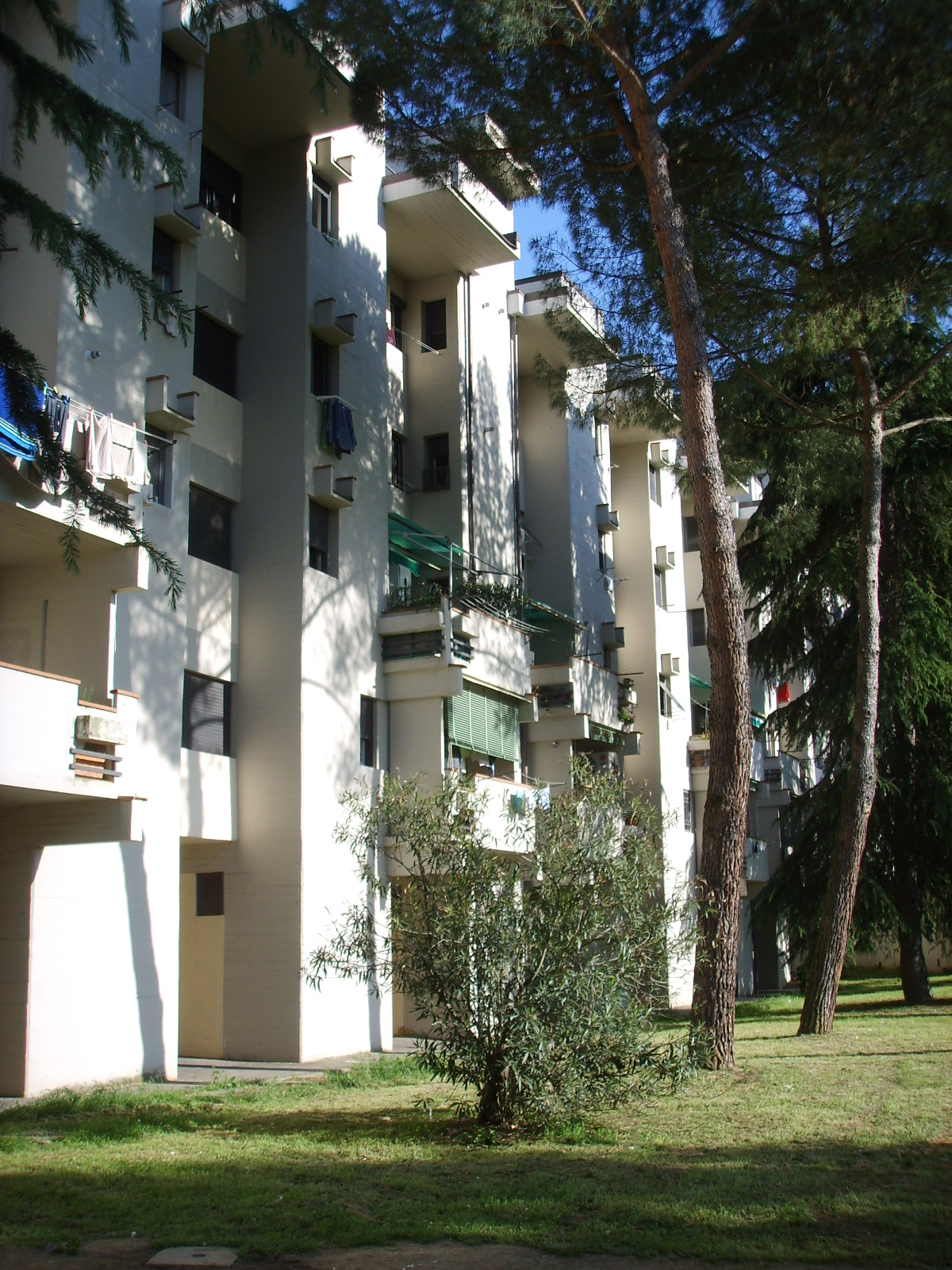
- Residential buildings in Sorgane
- Interactive map of Sorgane
- Coordinates: 43°45′4.54″N 11°18′20.12″E
- Country: Italy
- Region: Tuscany
- Metropolitan city: Florence
- Comune: Florence

Sorgane is a neighbourhood of Florence, Tuscany, Italy, located in the southeastern part of the city near the border with Bagno a Ripoli. It is part of the city's Quartiere 3 administrative district.

Originally a rural hamlet centred on Villa Giusti, Sorgane was redeveloped in the late 1950s and 1960s as a large public housing estate. The master plan, coordinated by Giovanni Michelucci in 1957, envisioned a satellite town for around 12,000 residents, although the project was later reduced in scale. The final scheme was designed by three architectural teams: one led by Leonardo Savioli (with Danilo Santi, Vittorio Giorgini, Ferrero Gori, Piero Melucci and Marco Dezzi Bardeschi), one led by Leonardo Ricci (with Antonio Canali, Luigi Cencetti, Fabrizio Milanese, Gianfranco Petrelli and Ernesto Trapani), and one led by Ferdinando Poggi (with Mario Focacci, Sirio Pastorini, Bruno Pedotti, Primo Saccardi and Giuseppe Sagrestani).

Sorgane is regarded as one of the most significant examples of post-war residential architecture in Florence.

== Sources ==
- Gerini, Bettino (2005). Vivere Firenze... Il Quartiere 3. Florence: Aster Italia.
- Koenig, Giovanni Klaus (1968). L'architettura in Toscana, 1931–1968. Florence: Edifir.
- Firenze: guida di architettura (in Italian). Florence: Alinea. 1992.
- Polano, Sergio (1991). Guida all'architettura italiana del Novecento. Milan: Electa.
