= Isolotto, Florence =

Residential district of Florence, Italy

Isolotto
- Neighbourhood
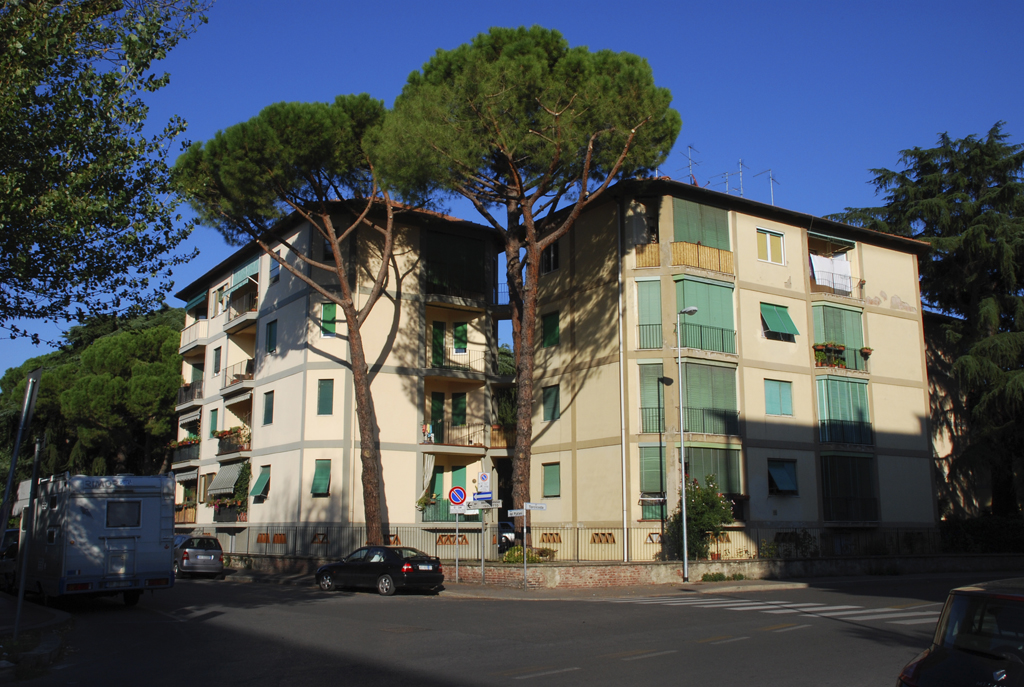
- Viale dei Platani in Isolotto
- Interactive map of Isolotto
- Coordinates: 43°46′41″N 11°13′01″E
- Country: Italy
- Region: Tuscany
- Metropolitan city: Florence
- Comune: Florence
- Quarter: 4 (Isolotto-Legnaia)
- Time zone: UTC+1 (CET)
  - Summer (DST): UTC+2 (CEST)

Isolotto is a residential district in the southwestern part of Florence, Tuscany, Italy. It forms part of Quartiere 4 and is one of the city's best-known post-war neighbourhoods. Developed mainly during the 1950s under the INA-Casa housing programme, it is regarded as one of the most significant examples of post-war public housing and planning in Italy.

== History ==
Before urbanisation, the area consisted largely of farmland and scattered rural settlements along Via Pisana. Modern development began after World War II, when the municipality selected the site for a large INA-Casa housing estate.

The master plan was prepared in 1950–1951 by Sirio Pastorini, Mario Pellegrini, Ferdinando Poggi, and Francesco Tiezzi, with contributions from several prominent Italian architects, including Giovanni Michelucci, Raffaello Fagnoni, Italo Gamberini, Enrico Del Debbio, and Giuseppe Vaccaro. The first residents moved into the neighbourhood in 1954, when mayor Giorgio La Pira officially handed over the first apartments.

The district was conceived as a self-contained neighbourhood, combining housing with schools, shops, public services, green spaces, and a central square. This planning approach reflected contemporary ideas promoted by the INA-Casa programme and Northern European neighbourhood planning.

During the 1966 flood of the Arno, Isolotto was only partially flooded but became isolated from much of the city.

== Landmarks ==
Notable landmarks in Isolotto include:

- Santa Maria Madre delle Grazie a Isolotto, the parish church at the centre of the neighbourhood.
- Palazzo dei Diavoli, a 14th-century fortified residence on Via del Palazzo dei Diavoli.
- The Passerella dell'Isolotto, a pedestrian bridge across the Arno linking the district with the Parco delle Cascine, inaugurated in 1963.
- The Piazza dell'Isolotto and the riverside park along the Lungarno dei Pioppi.

== Sources ==
- Ariani, Lisa; Poli, Daniela (2024). Isolotto. Nascita di un quartiere, di una comunità e di un'idea di abitare solidale. Florence: All'Insegna del Giglio.
- Astengo, Giovanni (1951). "Nuovi quartieri in Italia". Urbanistica (7): 20–21.
- Belluzzi, Amedeo; Conforti, Claudia (1986). Giovanni Michelucci. Catalogo delle opere. Milan: Electa. p. 123.
- Bigazzi, Alberto (October 1960). "Isolotto città satellite". Firenze. Rassegna mensile del Comune: 78–80.
- Esposito, V.; Giovannoni, G. (May–June 1987). "I quartieri di edilizia pubblica nel dopoguerra". Edilizia Popolare: 73–78.
- Poli, Daniela (2004). Storie di quartiere. La vicenda INA-Casa nel villaggio Isolotto a Firenze. Florence: Polistampa.
