= Mario Pellegrini =

Italian architect (1910–1954)

- Born: 29 December 1910; Piacenza, Kingdom of Italy
- Died: 17 March 1954 (aged 43); Florence, Italy
- Education: Royal Higher School of Architecture of Florence
- Occupation: Architect

Mario Pellegrini (29 December 1910 – 17 March 1954) was an Italian architect and urban planner, mainly active in Florence and Tuscany.

== Life and career ==
A pupil of Giovanni Michelucci, Pellegrini graduated in architecture in 1936 from the Royal Higher School of Architecture of Florence with a thesis project for a villa at Poggio Panichi.

He worked mainly in Florence, where he developed a long professional collaboration with architect Sirio Pastorini. In 1937, the two architects won the competition for the headquarters of the National Handicraft Exhibition and Market (Mostra-mercato dell'Artigianato) at the Parterre in Florence, built between 1937 and 1939.

After World War II, Pellegrini participated in projects related to the reconstruction and modernization of Florence. In 1946 he collaborated with Gastone Doni, Emilio Dori, Guido Morozzi and Sirio Pastorini on the competition project for the reconstruction of the area around Ponte Vecchio and Santa Felicita. During the late 1940s and early 1950s, he designed several INA-Casa housing projects, including buildings in Via della Casaccia and Via di Varlungo (around 1949), and the housing complex between Via Francesco Baracca, Via Giuseppe Ancillotto, Via Francesco Morlacchi and Via Enrico Wolf Ferrari (1949–1950).

Among his later works were the extension of the "Leonardo da Vinci" Technical Industrial Institute (around 1950–1955), the INA-Casa residential buildings in Via Palazzo dei Diavoli (1952–1954), and the primary school in Settignano, designed in collaboration with Pastorini. He was one of the designers, together with Pastorini, Ferdinando Poggi and Francesco Tiezzi, of the Isolotto neighbourhood.

Pellegrini collaborated with the Florentine cultural magazine L'Ultima, where he published writings under the pseudonym "Il Glifo".

== Sources ==
- Ariani, Lisa; Poli, Daniela (2024). Isolotto. Nascita di un quartiere, di una comunità e di un'idea di abitare solidale. Florence: All'Insegna del Giglio.
- Carapelli, Gabriella (1994). "Gli operatori". Edilizia in Toscana fra le due guerre. Florence: Edifir.
- Cresti, Carlo; Gozzini, Mario, eds. (1996). Mario Pellegrini architetto e scrittore. Florence: Pontecorboli.
- Fantozzi Micali, Osanna (2002). Alla ricerca della Primavera. Firenze e provincia: dopoguerra e ricostruzione. Florence: Alinea.
- Insabato, Elisabetta; Ghelli, Cecilia, eds. (2007). Guida agli archivi di architetti e ingegneri del Novecento in Toscana. Florence: Edifir.
- Godoli, Ezio, ed. (2001). Architetture del Novecento: la Toscana. Florence: Polistampa.
