= Sirio Pastorini =

Italian architect and urban planner (1909–1994)

- Born: 17 October 1909; Florence, Kingdom of Italy
- Died: 1994 (aged 84–85); Florence, Italy
- Education: University of Florence
- Occupations: Architect, urban planner

Sirio Pastorini (17 October 1909 – 1994) was an Italian architect and urban planner based in Florence. He was active in architecture, urban planning, restoration, and post-war reconstruction projects in Tuscany during the mid-20th century.

== Life and career ==
Pastorini studied at the Scuola di Disegno degli Artigianelli and the Florence Art High School before graduating in architecture from the University of Florence in 1936.

In 1937, together with architect Mario Pellegrini, he won the competition for the headquarters of the National Handicraft Market (Ente Mercato Nazionale dell'Artigianato) at the Parterre in Florence. During and after World War II, he contributed to reconstruction efforts in Florence, including proposals for the rebuilding of damaged areas around the Ponte Vecchio and housing developments for the INA-Casa programme.

His later work included urban planning projects for the Isolotto, Sorgane, and Galluzzo neighbourhoods of Florence, industrial buildings, transport facilities, and restoration works on historic buildings in Tuscany.

== Selected works ==
- National Handicraft Market (Parterre), Florence (1937; with Mario Pellegrini)
- Military Geographic Institute headquarters, Florence (1942; with Raffaello Brizzi, Gastone Boni and G. Donzelli)
- Extension of Rosano Abbey, Rignano sull'Arno (1944–1945)
- La Fantina Orphanage school complex, Florence (1946–1961; later additions 1970–1972)
- Santa Felicita / Ponte Vecchio reconstruction plan, Florence (1947; with the Gruppo Santa Felicita)
- INA-Casa housing, Via Aretina, Florence (1949–1950)
- Florence Masterplan (1949–1951; with Lando Bartoli, Edoardo Detti, Leonardo Savioli, Giuseppe Sagrestani)
- Urban development plan for Via Baracca, Florence (1951)
- Church of San Niccolò in Nipozzano, Pelago, reconstruction (1952)
- Isolotto urban plan (East sector), Florence (1952–1955)
- PEAR industrial complex, Florence (1953–1959)
- Sorgane urban development, Florence (1958–1964)
- SITA Transport headquarters and mixed-use complex, Piazza della Stazione, Florence (1954–1957)
- Detailed development plan for Galluzzo, Florence (1961–1963)
- PEAR industrial plant, Montale (1966–1970)
- Restoration of the castle of the Guidi Counts in Porciano, Pratovecchio Stia (1970–1971; with engineer Piero Melucci)
- Renovation of the rectory of San Leonardo in Arcetri, Florence (1975)

== Archives ==
The Pastorini Archive consists of approximately 80 rolls of architectural drawings and 42 folders documenting his professional work. It includes project drawings, plans, and related records for works carried out independently and in collaboration, especially with Mario Pellegrini. Despite some gaps, the archive preserves extensive supporting documentation, including construction records and site notebooks, as well as detailed interior design projects for private and public commissions.

== Sources ==
- Carapelli, Gabriella (1994). "Gli operatori". Edilizia in Toscana fra le due guerre. Florence: Edifir. p. 232.
- Carapelli, Gabriella; Ghelli, Cecilia (2007). "Sirio Pastorini". In Insabato, Elisabetta; Ghelli, Cecilia (eds.). Guida agli archivi di architetti e ingegneri del Novecento in Toscana. Florence: Edifir. pp. 272–276.
- Godoli, Ezio, ed. (2001). Architetture del Novecento: la Toscana. Florence: Polistampa.
- Gurrieri, Francesco (1981). Una mattina del '44. Disegni di Sirio Pastorini per Firenze distrutta. Florence: Libreria Editrice Salimbeni.
