= Banca Monte Parma =

Defunct regional bank in Italy

- Company type: Subsidiary (Società per Azioni)
- Industry: Financial services
- Founded: 27 January 1488
- Defunct: 2015
- Headquarters: Piazzale Jacopo Sanvitale, Parma, Italy
- Key people: Flavio Venturini (president)
- Products: Retail and investment banking, insurance, investment management
- Revenue: ▲€84.775 million (2014)
- Operating income: ▲€30.939 million (2014)
- Net income: ▲ (€9.762 million) (2014)
- Total assets: ▼€2.171 billion (2014)
- Total equity: ▼€178 million (2014)
- Owner: Fondazione Monteparma (1991–2011, majority; 2011–2014, minority); Intesa Sanpaolo (2011–)
- Parent: Intesa Sanpaolo (98.62%)
- Website: monteparma.it

Banca Monte Parma was an Italian regional bank, active in the provinces of Parma, Piacenza and Reggio-Emilia. In mid-2015 it was absorbed into the parent company.

== History ==
The bank was founded in Parma in 1488 as Mons Pietatis Almae Civitatis Parmae by Bernardine of Feltre, in order to combat usury – he was known for his violent anti-Judaism. This makes it one of the oldest banks in the world.

== Operations ==
In 1991, in order to comply with new Italian banking regulations, the company became a joint-stock company and a subsidiary of Fondazione Monte di Parma (Fondazione Monteparma).

=== Cariplo as minority shareholder ===
From 1994 to 1999, Cassa di Risparmio delle Provincie Lombarde (Cariplo) owned 20.5% of Banca Monte Parma with the rest held by the foundation. Cariplo was a wholly owned subsidiary of Banca Intesa since 1998.

=== Foundation & Banca MPS joint venture ===
In August 1999 Banca Intesa sold all shares it held to Banca Monte dei Paschi di Siena. Banca also acquired shares from the foundation directly. At the year end of 2000, the foundation held 50.47% shares, followed by Banca MPS for 41%, its subsidiary "Monte Paschi Vita" for 7.72% (in 2001 8.26%) and the rest held by others. In 2007, Banca MPS consolidated its ownership to be held by Banca MPS SpA only, for 49.27%.

=== Independent again ===
In 2008, Banca MPS sold all its ownership. The foundation increased its ownership ratio to 68.74%, as well as the introduction of Fondazione di Piacenza e Vigevano (who lost the ownership on Cassa di Risparmio di Piacenza e Vigevano) and Banca Sella Holding, for 15% and 10% respectively. CBA Vita (a subsidiary of Banca Sella Holding) and HDI Assicurazioni both held 3%. In the next year Fondazione di Piacenza e Vigevano increased to 18% ownership, with Banca Sella reduced to 4.597%, as well as HDI reduced to 2.2% and introduction of new investor Compagnia Generale Immobiliare S.r.l. ("CGI" in short) for 3%. The ratio remain almost constant until the takeover of Intesa Sanpaolo on 26 July 2011.

=== Intesa Sanpaolo era ===
On 26 July 2011 Intesa Sanpaolo acquired all shares from Banca Sella Holding, CBA Vita and HDI Assicurazioni, as well as part of the shares from Fondazione Monteparma, Fondazione di Piacenza e Vigevano and CGI. The new ownership became Intesa Sanpaolo 60.798%, Fondazione Monte di Parma 20.987%, Fondazione di Piacenza e Vigevano 15.214%, CGI 2.536%.

In 2012 Intesa Sanpaolo further increased to 78.617% from recapitalization, as well as the foundations both reduced to 10% each and CGI 1.254%.

The bank was a member of the Euro Banking Association, however it is no longer a member after it became a subsidiary.

On 22 December 2014 Intesa Sanpaolo acquired the 20% from the foundations; At the end of 2014 financial year Intesa Sanpaolo was the major shareholder of Banca Monte Parma for 98.62%.

In mid-2015 the bank was absorbed into Intesa Sanpaolo.

=== Sponsorship ===
The bank was the principal sponsor of Serie A football team Parma F.C. The bank also owned 20% shares of "Eventi Sportivi S.p.A.", the parent company of Parma FC SpA in 2008 (increased from 10% after recapitalization from €3m to €6m), but diluted back to 5% in 2009, followed by 4.2% in 2011. As of 2014 financial year, the bank still retained the shares.

== See also ==
- Former headquarters of Banca Monte Parma
- List of banks in Italy
