= Rosario Vernuccio =

Italian architect (1925–2023)

- Born: 10 October 1925; Gela, Kingdom of Italy
- Died: 24 March 2023 (aged 97); Florence, Italy
- Education: University of Florence
- Occupations: Architect, designer, academic

Rosario Vernuccio (10 October 1925 – 24 March 2023), also known as Rino Vernuccio, was an Italian architect, designer and academic.

== Life and career ==
Vernuccio graduated in architecture from the University of Florence in 1953, where, in the same year, he began his teaching career in the Department of Interior Architecture, collaborating with Giuseppe Giorgio Gori. In 1969, he obtained his teaching qualification. From 1980 to 2002, he was a full professor of architectural design at the same faculty.

Vernuccio took part in numerous architectural design competitions, receiving several awards, including: first prize for a middle school in Grosseto (1957); second and third prize in the RIV International Competition in Turin (1959); first prize for the furnishing design of the Mostra internazionale dell'artigianato in Florence (1961); first prize in the VIS Competition in Milan (1961); and first prize in the Rome competition for a prefabricated middle school.

Among his principal works are the Affrico overpass in Florence, the Grosseto Courthouse, the interior design for the management and offices of the Autostrada A1, and several exhibition installations, including the Exhibition of Gift Objects (Palazzo Strozzi, 1963); the Le Corbusier exhibition (Palazzo Strozzi, 1964); and the Exhibition on the Administrative Unification of Italy (Palazzo Pitti, 1965). In collaboration with Italo Gamberini, Franco Bonaiuti, and Loris Macci, Vernuccio designed the new headquarters of the Florence State Archives in Piazza Beccaria between 1978 and 1982.

He authored numerous scholarly contributions, articles, and studies exploring the relationship between research and architectural design. In 2009, he was appointed an honorary member of the Accademia delle Arti del Disegno.

Vernuccio died in Florence on 24 March 2023.

== Works (selection) ==
- School building in Grosseto (1957–1961), with Giuseppe Giorgio Gori
- Grosseto Courthouse (1959–1964), with Gori
- Affrico overpass in Florence (1961), with Gori
- Middle school on Via Galcianese in Prato (1962), with Gori
- Pancani House in Signa (1968–1971), with Carlo Chiappi
- Colombo Elementary School in Florence (1971)
- Pirandello Elementary and Middle School in Cintoia, Florence (1971), with Chiappi, Franco Bonaiuti, Alessandro Grassellini, and Paolo Pettini
- State Archives of Florence (1972–1988), with Italo Gamberini, Bonaiuti, and Loris Macci
- School complex in Borgo San Lorenzo (1979), with Chiappi and Bonaiuti
- Student Residence on Viale Morgagni in Florence (1986), with Gori and Pettini
- Redevelopment of Florence Airport (1989–1998)
- Mixed-use complex with housing and hotel in Campi Bisenzio (2004)

== Bibliography ==
- Andrea Aleardi; Corrado Marcetti, eds. (2011). L'architettura in Toscana dal 1945 ad oggi. Una guida alla selezione delle opere di rilevante interesse storico-artistico. Florence: Alinea.
- Catalani, Barbara; Del Francia, Marco; Tombari, Giovanni (2011). Itinerari di architettura contemporanea. Grosseto e provincia. Pisa: ETS.
- Fabbrizzi, Fabio (2008). "Rosario Vernuccio". Opere e progetti di scuola fiorentina. 1968-2008. Florence: Alinea. pp. 370–385.
- Elisabetta Insabato; Cecilia Ghelli, eds. (2007). Guida agli archivi di architetti e ingegneri del Novecento in Toscana. Florence: Edifir.
