= Franco Bonaiuti =

Italian architect

- Born: 4 December 1920; Fiesole, Province of Florence, Kingdom of Italy
- Died: 20 June 2007 (aged 86); Florence, Tuscany, Italy
- Education: University of Florence
- Occupation: Architect

Franco Bonaiuti (4 December 1920 – 20 June 2007) was an Italian architect.

== Life and career ==
Bonaiuti graduated in architecture at the University of Florence in 1948, under the mentorship of Giovanni Michelucci. In post-war reconstruction Tuscany, he designed several residential buildings on Via delle Montalve (1956), Via Alamanni (1957), and Via Masaccio (1959) in Florence; single-family houses in Fiesole (1949); and multi-family buildings in Pian di Scò, in the province of Arezzo (1953).

Between 1963 and 1965, he built housing on Lungarno Cellini and in Bellosguardo, in Florence. In 1968, he designed an office building and residential districts on Via Quintino Sella, and in 1969, a building on Via Leone X, in Florence.

Bonaiuti also worked in urban planning, developing various land subdivisions in the Fiesole area and creating detailed plans for blocks between Via Rossellini and Via Dei (1970), and between Via Galliano, Via Maragliano, and Via Spontini (1972) in Florence. In 1976, he was involved in the renovation of the European University Institute complex in San Domenico, Fiesole. Together with Carlo Chiappi, he designed the new schools in Pontassieve and Borgo San Lorenzo in 1979. Between 1976 and 1989, he focused on renovating the Palazzo Panciatichi and the Palazzo Capponi-Covoni on Via Cavour in Florence, which were intended to house the Regional Council of Tuscany.

In collaboration with Italo Gamberini, Rosario Vernuccio, and Loris Macci, he designed the new headquarters of the Florence State Archives in Piazza Beccaria between 1978 and 1982.

Alongside his professional activity, Bonaiuti was also a member of the technical-administrative committee of the Public Works Department of Tuscany from 1969.

== Bibliography ==
- Andrea Aleardi; Corrado Marcetti, eds. (2011). L'architettura in Toscana dal 1945 ad oggi. Una guida alla selezione delle opere di rilevante interesse storico-artistico. Florence: Alinea.
- Elisabetta Insabato; Cecilia Ghelli, eds. (2007). Guida agli archivi di architetti e ingegneri del Novecento in Toscana. Florence: Edifir.
- Ulisse Tramonti (2008). Franco Bonaiuti architetto. Florence: Alinea.
