= Fondazione di Piacenza e Vigevano =

Italian banking foundation

Fondazione Piacenza e Vigevano formerly Fondazione Cassa di Risparmio di Piacenza e Vigevano, is a charity organization based in Piacenza, Emilia–Romagna region.

== History ==
=== Bank investments ===
Due to Legge Amato, Cassa di Risparmio di Piacenza e Vigevano spin off its bank activities to form a limited company (Società per Azioni) in December 1991 (gazetted on 21 January 1992). The original public entity was renamed into Fondazione Cassa di Risparmio di Piacenza e Vigevano.

The bank was merged with Cassa di Risparmio di Parma to form Cassa di Risparmio di Parma e Piacenza in 1992. The bank was acquired by Banca Intesa, which the foundation became a minority shareholders for 0.131% as at 31 December 2000. The ratio increased to 0.15% in 2001, diluted to 0.146% in 2002. In 2003 the foundation sold all the remain shares as well as bought a minority interests on Cassa Depositi e Prestiti (0.43%) and Banca Popolare di Sondrio (0.05%).

The foundation was a minority shareholder of FarBanca until 2004. In 2008 the foundation bought 15% minority ownership of Banca Monte Parma from Banca Monte dei Paschi di Siena, thus returned to banking sector to partner with the major shareholder of the bank, Fondazione Monteparma. In 2009 the ownership ratio increased to 18%. However, due to the net loss of the bank, the foundations agreed to sell the bank to Intesa Sanpaolo in 2011 with Intesa bore most of the amount of capital increase of the bank. On 22 December 2014 the foundation did not hold any shares on the bank any more.

=== Other investments ===
In 2004 the foundation expanded its investment on stock markets from €26,445,087.90 to €68,088,478.60, including increase in investments on Banca Popolare di Sondrio (0.12% ownership), as well as Aeroterminal Venezia (3.79% ownership), Enel (0.02% ownership), Eni (0.003% ownership), Assicurazioni Generali (0.004% ownership), RAS Assicurazioni (0.02% ownership), Snam Rete Gas (0.03% ownership), Sanpaolo IMI (0.004% ownership), UniCredit (0.008% ownership) and STMicroelectronics (0.11% ownership), despite in the next year the interests in Banca Popolare di Sondrio, Eni, Generali, RAS, Snam, Sanpaolo IMI, UniCredit and STMicroelectronics were sold in exchange with the increase in the interests in Enel to 0.08% (decreased to 0.06% next year and remain in the same level as of 2013). The foundation invested on Notrine S.A. in 2006 (for 15% shares). In 2007 the foundation invested on Enìa (0.37% of the total shares). In 2008 as well as the investment in Banca Monte Parma, the ownership in Aereoterminal Venezia was also decreased to 3.29% of the total shares. In 2010 the foundation invested in First Capital SpA for 2% shares.

As of 31 December 2013 the foundation had an equity of €347 million.

In 2014 a scandal was exposed for the mismanagement of the investment of the foundation.
