= Ponte Amerigo Vespucci =

Bridge crossing the Arno in Florence, Italy

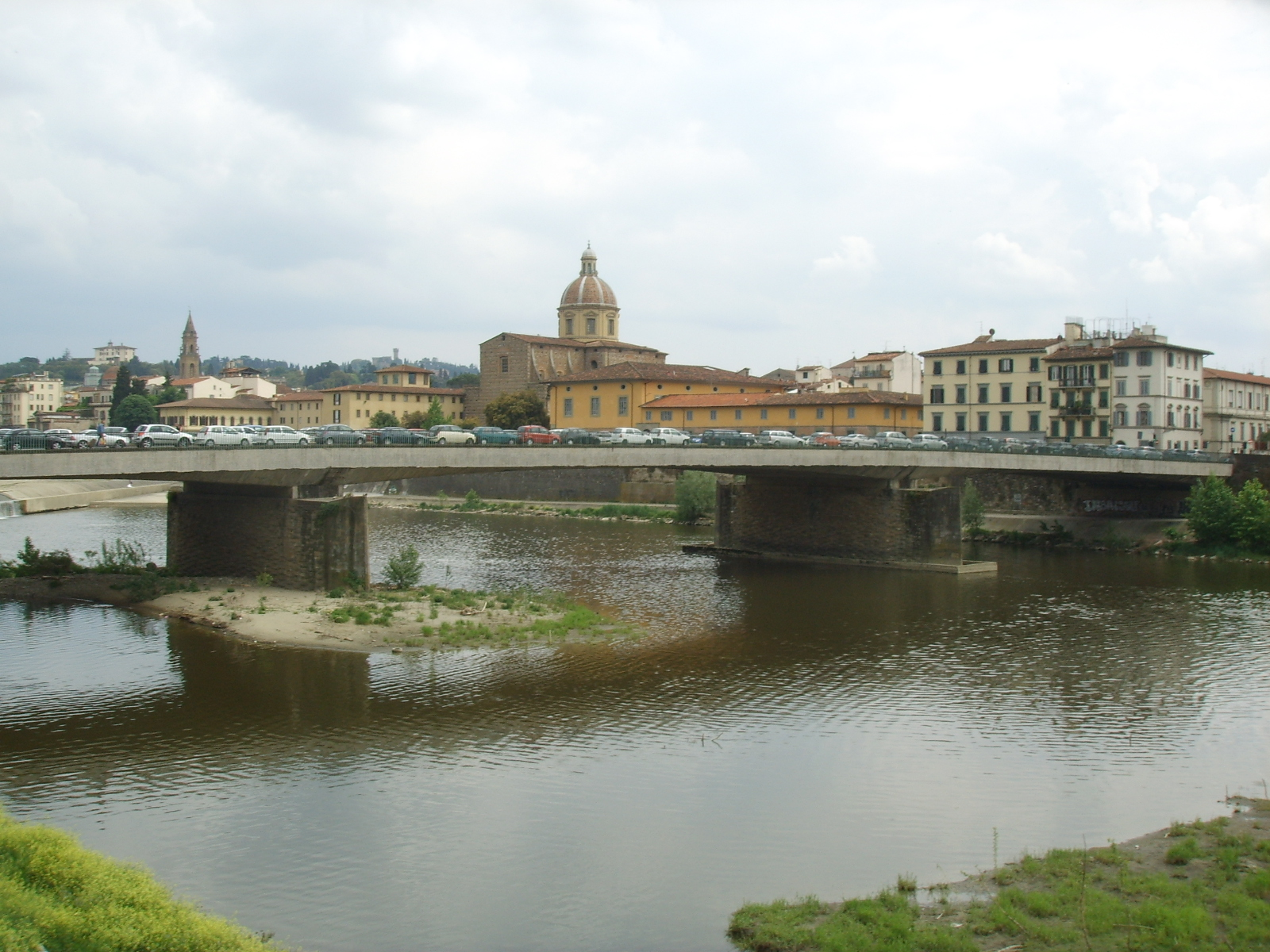
- Coordinates: 43.77191°N 11.24293°E
- Carries: automobiles, pedestrians
- Crosses: Arno River
- Locale: Florence, Italy

Characteristics
- Total length: 162.9 m
- Width: 22.5 m
- Height: 9.5 m
- No. of spans: 3

History
- Designer: Giuseppe Giorgio Gori, Enzo Gori, Riccardo Morandi, Ernesto Nelli
- Construction start: 1955
- Construction end: 1957

Ponte Amerigo Vespucci is a bridge over the Arno River in Florence, Italy and named after Florence-born explorer Amerigo Vespucci. It joins the Lungarno Amerigo Vespucci to the Lungarno Soderini. To the east is the Ponte alla Carraia.

This bridge, like most of the other bridges over the Arno, is a reconstruction. Plans were made in 1908 to bridge this section of the Arno to service quartiere di San Frediano, but the plans were never realized. In 1949, a bridge, ponte di via Melegnano, was constructed from the recycled remains of other bridges that had been destroyed by the Nazi army as they withdrew before the advancing Allied forces during World War II.

Between 1952 and 1954, a competition for the construction of a new bridge was held, and the plan of the architects Giuseppe Giorgio Gori, Enzo Gori and Ernesto Nelli and of engineer Riccardo Morandi was chosen. The plan called for three spans in a thin, flat arch over two piers which supports the roadway. The final effect gives the impression of a single, slightly curved span. Construction on the bridge was completed in 1957.

It was designed to be reflective of the nearby historical structures but also to be an obviously modern structure.

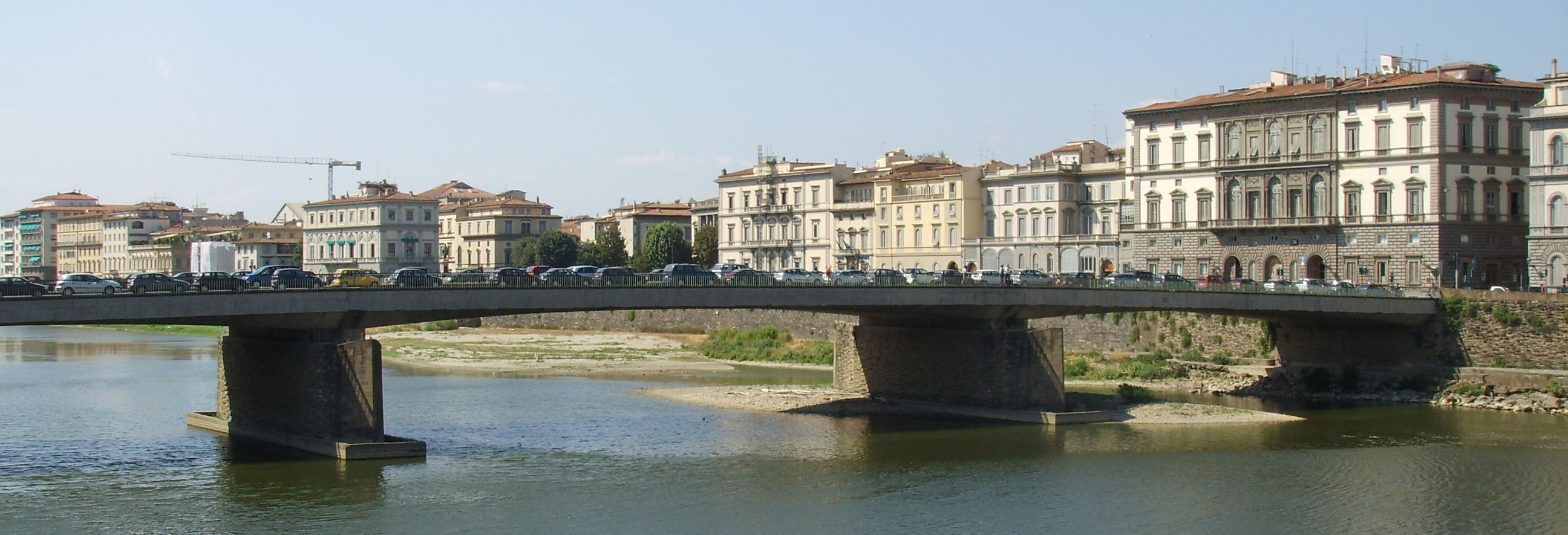
Ponte Amerigo Vespucci
