= State Archives of Florence =

Italian State Archives

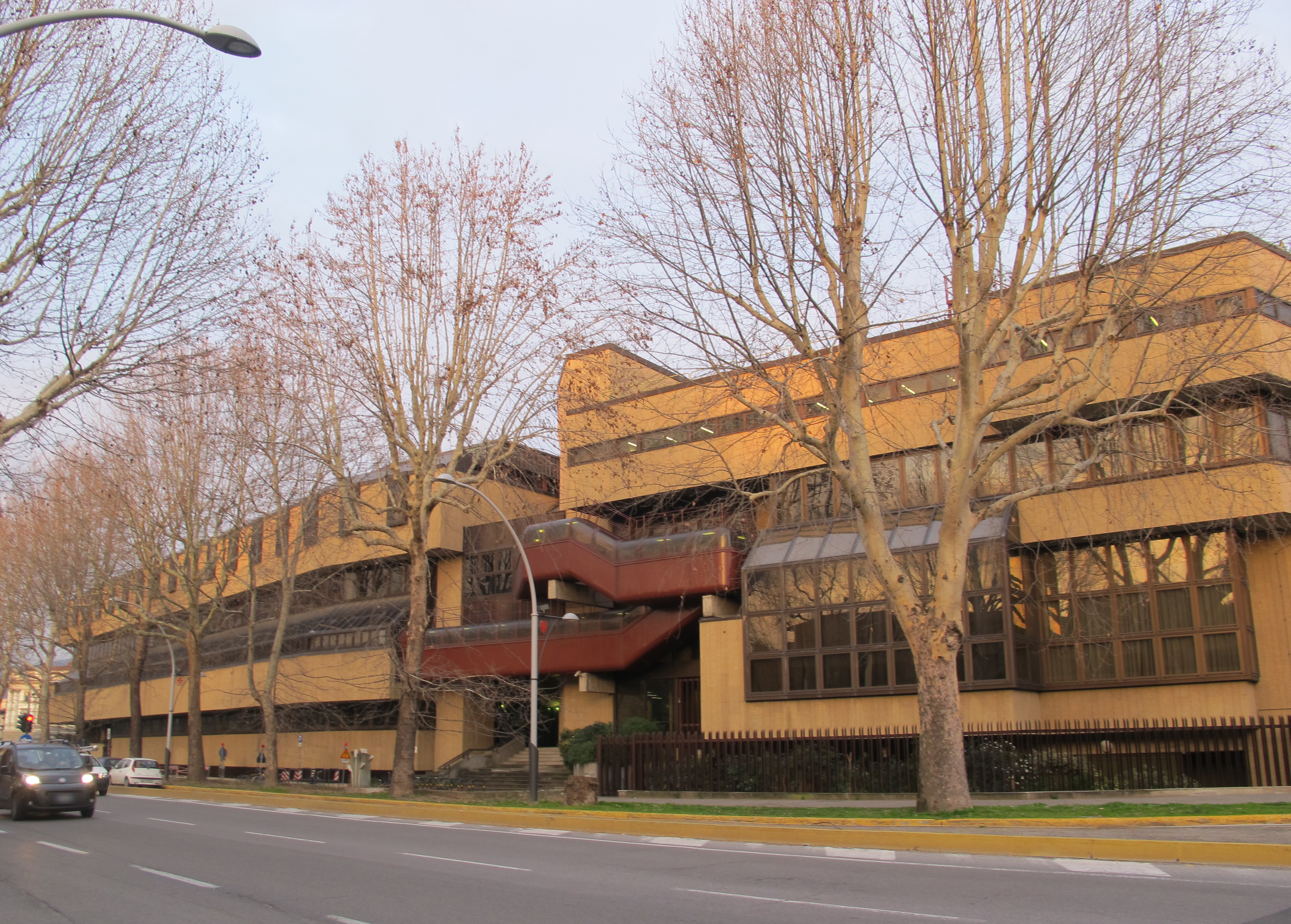
- Interactive map of State Archives of Florence
- 43.768988°N 11.270219°E
- Location: Viale della Giovine Italia, 6, Florence, Italy
- Type: State archives
- Established: 20 February 1852; 174 years ago
- Director: Michele Di Sivo

Building information
- Architect: Italo Gamberini, Rosario Vernuccio, Franco Bonaiuti, Loris Macci
- Construction date: 1974–1989
- Website: https://archiviodistatofirenze.cultura.gov.it/asfi/home

The State Archives of Florence (Italian: Archivio di Stato di Firenze) is the repository for the public records and archives of the Italian city of Florence. The archive holds over 600 fonds dating back to the 8th century which, laid out in a line, would stretch over 75 km (46 miles).

== History ==
The archive was founded on 20 February 1852, by decree of the Grand Duke Leopold II of Tuscany. Until 1989, the archive was located in the Uffizi.

On 4 November 1966, the River Arno flooded, causing damage to over 60,000 pieces of archival material. The flood instigated the decision to construct a modern building for the archives further from the River Arno. The new building, designed by Italo Gamberini, Rosario Vernuccio, Franco Bonaiuti, and Loris Macci, was begun in 1974. It included a space for the conservation laboratory, which was founded shortly after the 1966 to recover damaged documents.

Between 1987-1988 archival materials were transferred from the Uffizi to their current location, on the Viale della Giovine Italia, near the Piazza Cesare Beccaria in Florence. The new building staff have included Gaetano Milanesi among others.

== See also ==
- List of State Archives of Italy
