= Massa Courthouse =

Judiciary building in Massa, Italy

- Interactive map of the Massa Courthouse area

General information
- Location: Massa, Tuscany, Italy
- Coordinates: 44°2′6.03″N 10°8′4.86″E
- Construction started: 1967
- Completed: 1976
- Opening: 1976; 50 years ago

Design and construction
- Architects: Edoardo Detti, Luigi Caldarelli

The Massa Courthouse (Italian: Palazzo di Giustizia di Massa, lit. 'Palace of Justice of Massa', also known as Palazzo degli Uffici Giudiziari) is a judicial complex located in Massa, Italy.

== History ==
After the urban planning experiences of the master plan and the two neighborhoods of Romagnano and San Leonardo, architect Edoardo Detti was involved by the Massa administration in the project for the new local courthouse and prosecutor's office.

The early studies began, together with architect Luigi Caldarelli, in 1960, and an initial executive project was prepared in 1961. After various reworkings, a second executive project was completed in 1964, this time approved.

Construction started in 1967 but was halted in 1969 due to lack of funds and the architect's difficult relations with the construction company. Work was resumed in the early 1970s, and the building was finally inaugurated in 1976.

== Description ==
The complex is located at the southwestern end of Massa's historic center, in Piazza Alcide De Gasperi, between the Frigido River and Via Europa. It is situated in an area developed in the 1950s and 1960s, primarily intended for residential and office use.

The building, spanning three floors plus a basement, features an "L" shaped layout with a central connecting section consisting of a large portico with pillars and a green roof terrace; in the center are cylindrical staircases that connect the two wings of the building and facilitate access to the judicial functions. It has a compact appearance, mainly made of exposed concrete, with limited openings and loggias between the masonry and windows. The roof and facades are decorated with plastic details and diverse materials, including colored plaster and glass.

Inside, the spaces are arranged around a large, light-filled hall accessible from the portico, from which corridors and courtrooms extend. The courtrooms are illuminated from above and feature marble floors and ceilings with square modules. Notable areas also include a spiral marble staircase and window frames in aluminium and wood.

== Critical reception ==
The critique has recognized the sculptural value and the study of volumes, while nevertheless highlighting the poor execution of the work. Zoppi (1986) emphasized the compositional mastery, noting that "all the design finesse of Detti's most renowned works can be found here: the perspectival scan, the design of the fixtures, the skylight windows". Giorgieri (1987) perceived its relationships with international architectural culture, particularly with Le Corbusier's developments in Chandigarh. Although he noted that the realization somewhat devalued the work, he still regarded it as one of the most significant examples of modern architecture in the province. Others have highlighted the influence of Carlo Scarpa's style, and Lisini and Mugnai (2013) suggested a genuine Scarpa's involvement in the design phase.

== Sources ==
- Massimo Bertozzi (1985). Massa. Genoa: SAGEP. p. 90.
- Augusto Boggiano; Mariella Zoppi, eds. (1986). Quaderni d'Urbanistica informazioni. Vol. I. Florence. p. 81.
- Philippe Duboy, ed. (1993). Edoardo Detti (1913-1984) architetto e urbanista. Dilemma sul futuro di Firenze. Milan: Electa.
- Pietro Giorgieri (1989). Itinerari apuani di architettura moderna. Florence: Alinea. p. 112.
- Ezio Godoli, ed. (2001). Architetture del Novecento: la Toscana. Florence: Polistampa. p. 116.
- Caterina Lisini; Francesca Mugnai (2013). Edoardo Detti architetto e urbanista 1913-1984. Archivio (PDF). Parma: Diabasi.
