= Ponte alla Carraia =

Bridge in Florence, Italy

Coordinates: 43°46′12.87″N 11°14′50.09″E

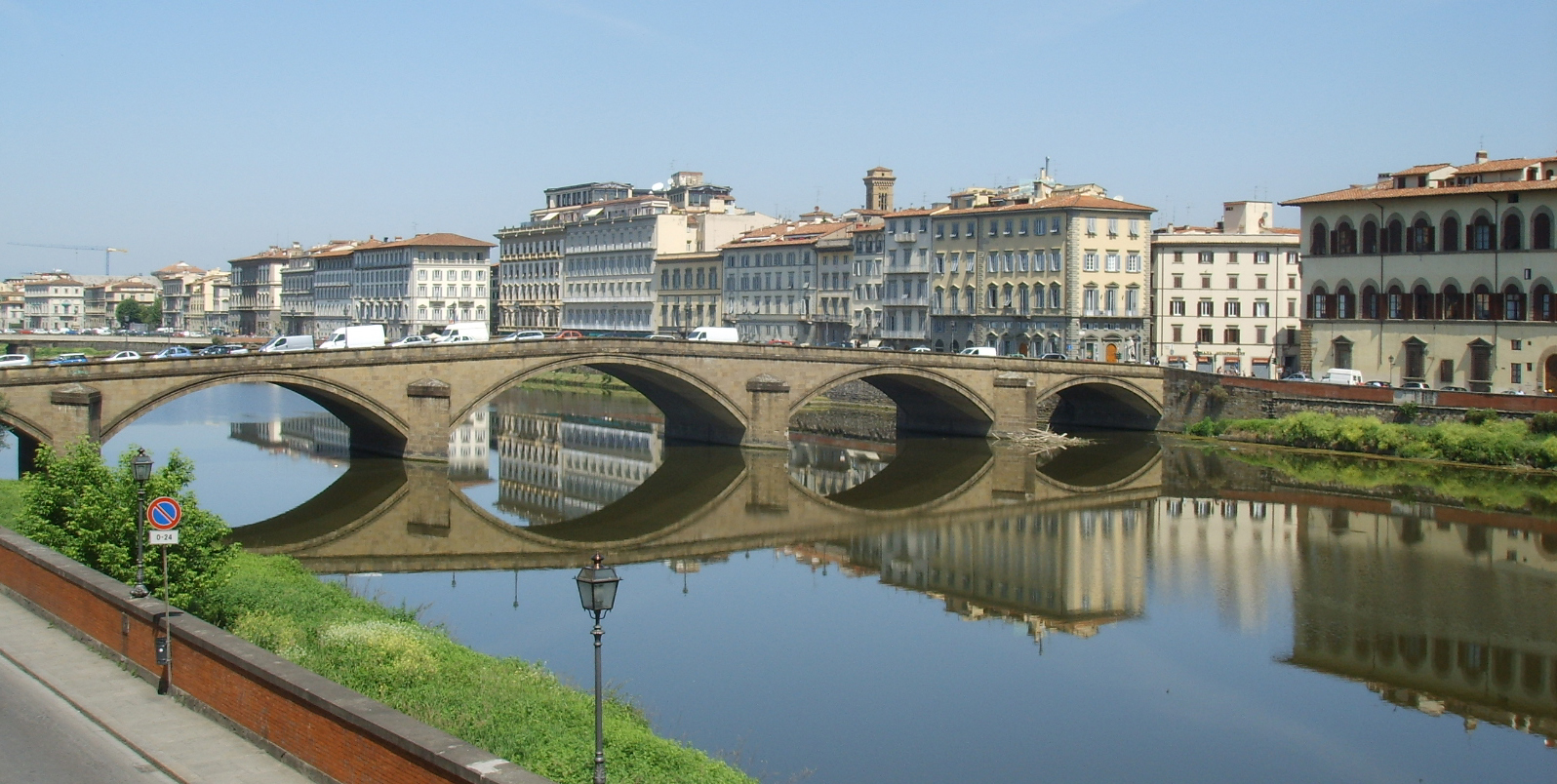
Ponte alla Carraia.

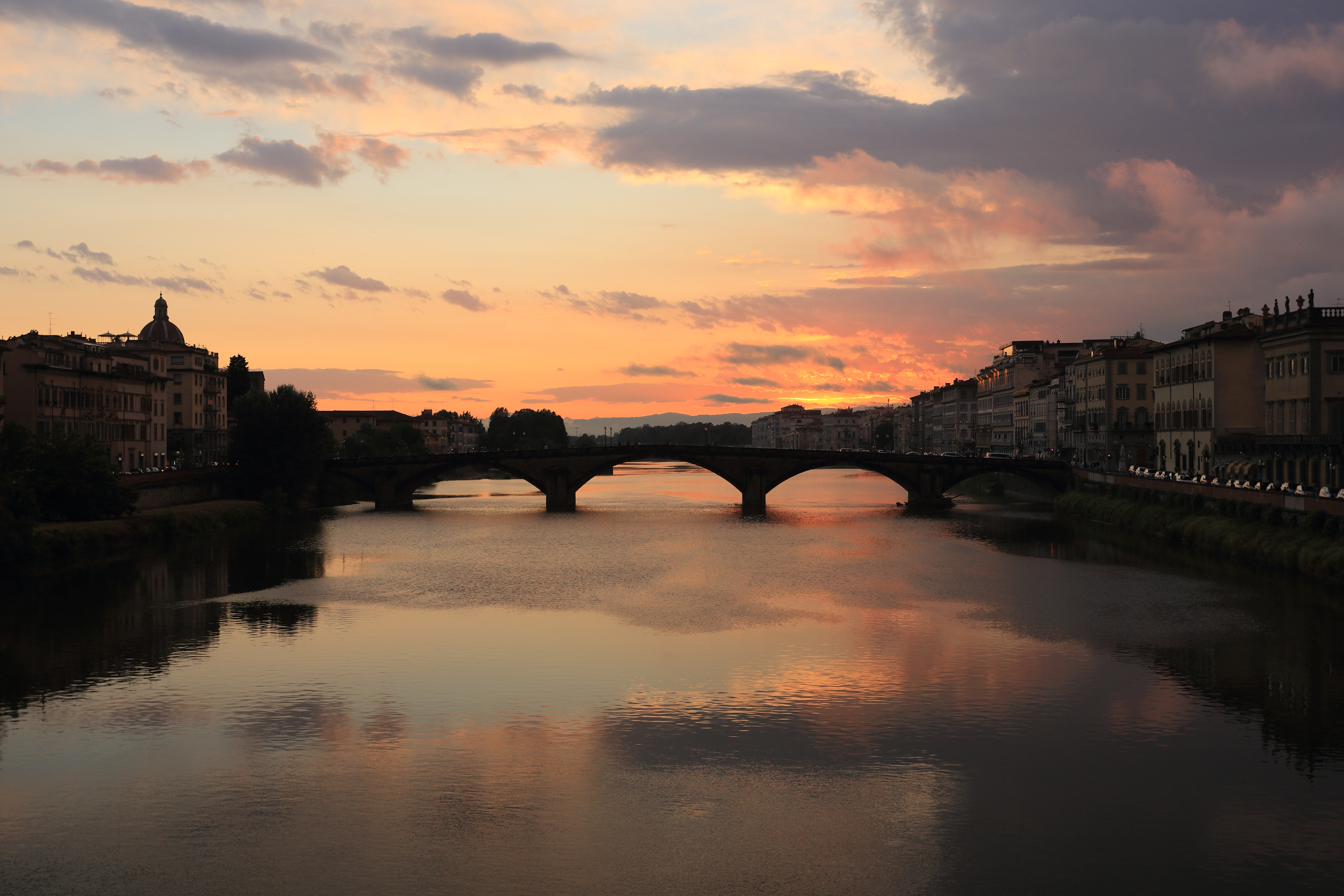
At sunset

The Ponte alla Carraia is a five-arched bridge spanning the River Arno and linking the district of Oltrarno to the rest of the city of Florence, Italy. To the west is a weir, the Pescaia di Santa Rosa, and the Ponte Amerigo Vespucci, and to the east is the Ponte Santa Trinita. The piazzas on either bank are the Piazza Nazario Sauro (south) and the Piazza Carlo Goldoni (north). At the northernmost column of the bridge a family of coypus live in a dam.

== History ==
The first mention of the bridge (then built in wood) dates from 1218. Destroyed by a flood in 1274, it was soon reconstructed, but fell down again in 1304 under the weight of a crowd who had met to watch a spectacle. It was the first bridge in the city rebuilt after the 1333 flood, perhaps under design of Giotto. Again damaged in 1557, it was remade by will of Grand Duke Cosimo I de' Medici, who assigned the project to Bartolomeo Ammannati.

Enlarged during the 19th century, the bridge was blown up by the retreating German Army during World War II (1944). The current structure is a design by Ettore Fagiuoli, completed in 1948.

== Sources ==
- Guerrieri, Francesco; Lucia Bracci; Giancarlo Pedreschi (1988). I ponti sull'Arno dal Falterona al mare. Florence: Edizioni Polistampa.
