= Sacro Cuore, Florence =

Church in Florence, Italy

Coordinates: 43°46′25.94″N 11°16′40.97″E

Church of the Sacred Heart (Chiesa del Sacro Cuore)
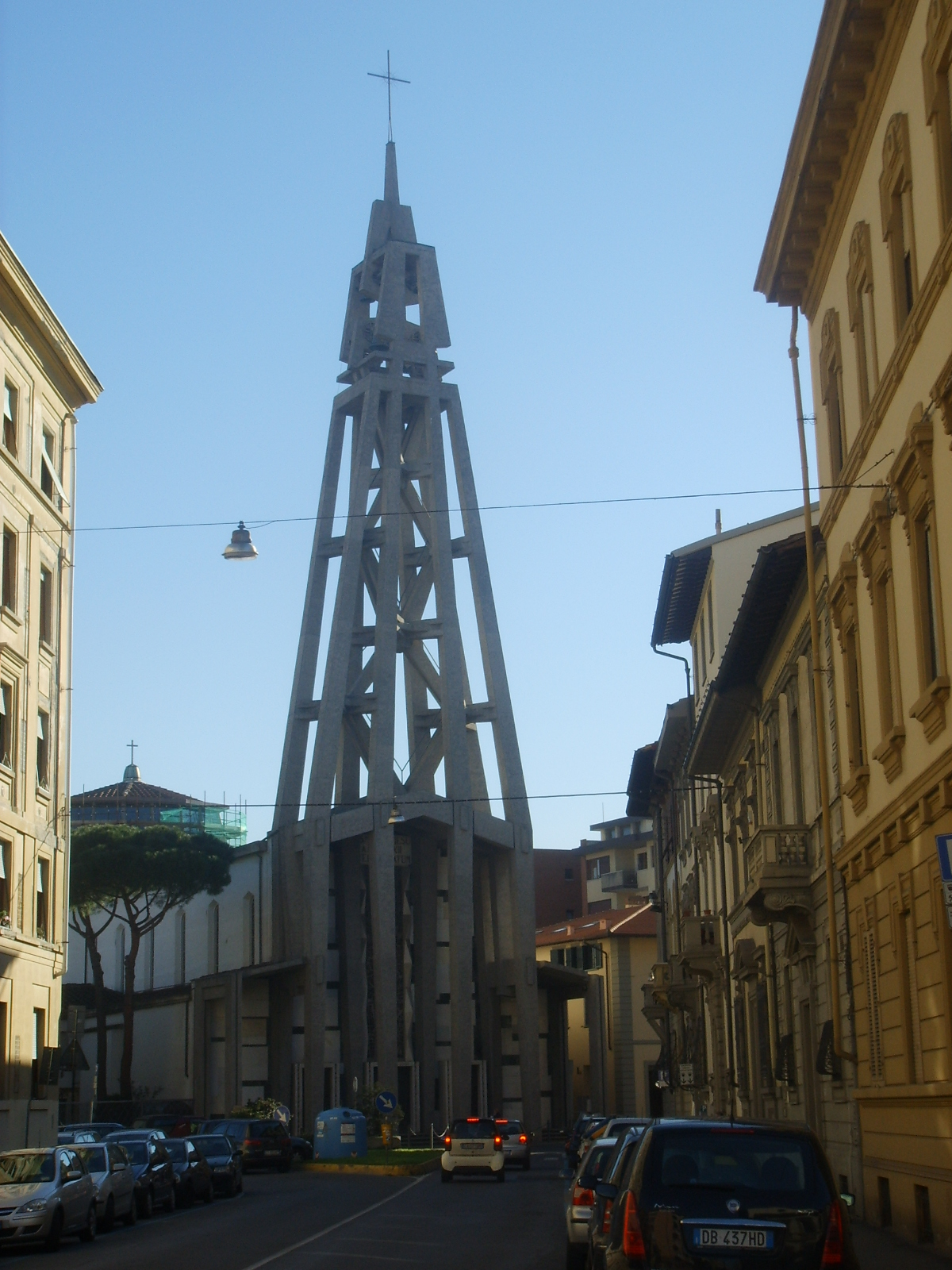
- View of the church and its bell tower of reinforced concrete.

Religion
- Affiliation: Roman Catholic
- Province: Florence

Location
- Location: Florence, Italy
- Interactive map of Church of the Sacred Heart (Chiesa del Sacro Cuore)

Architecture
- Architect: Lando Bartoli
- Type: Church
- Groundbreaking: 1874
- Completed: 1877

The Chiesa del Sacro Cuore (lit. 'Church of the Sacred Heart') is a church located in Via Capo di Mondo in Florence, Italy.

Ludovico da Casoria, a Franciscan priest, founder of the Congregation of Frati Bigi, had the church built between 1874 and 1877, on the model of San Salvatore al Monte. In 1941 it became a parish church and the building was completely restructured by the architect Lando Bartoli between 1956 and 1962. For the extremely modern bell tower the architect was assisted by Pier Luigi Nervi. There is a stained glass window of the Resurrection by Marcello Avelani, bronze doors and ceramic saints by Angelo Biancini, mosaic Stations of the Cross by Giovanni Haynal, a crucifix by Umberto Bartoli, a 16th-century Madonna and Child, a Last Supper by Giovanni Stradano and the Apparition of the Sacred Heart by Antonio Ciseri (1880).

== Gallery ==
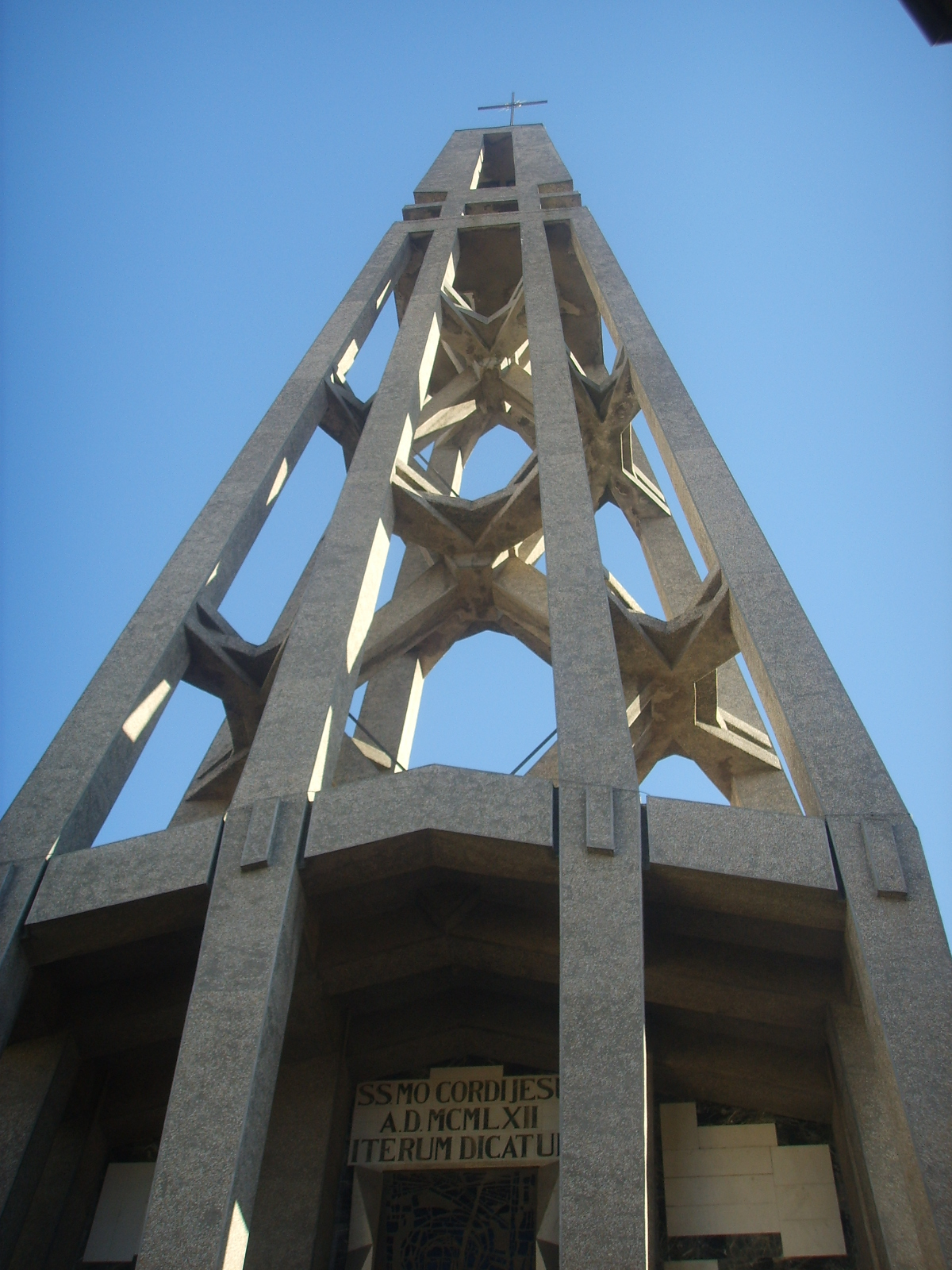
The base of the bell tower

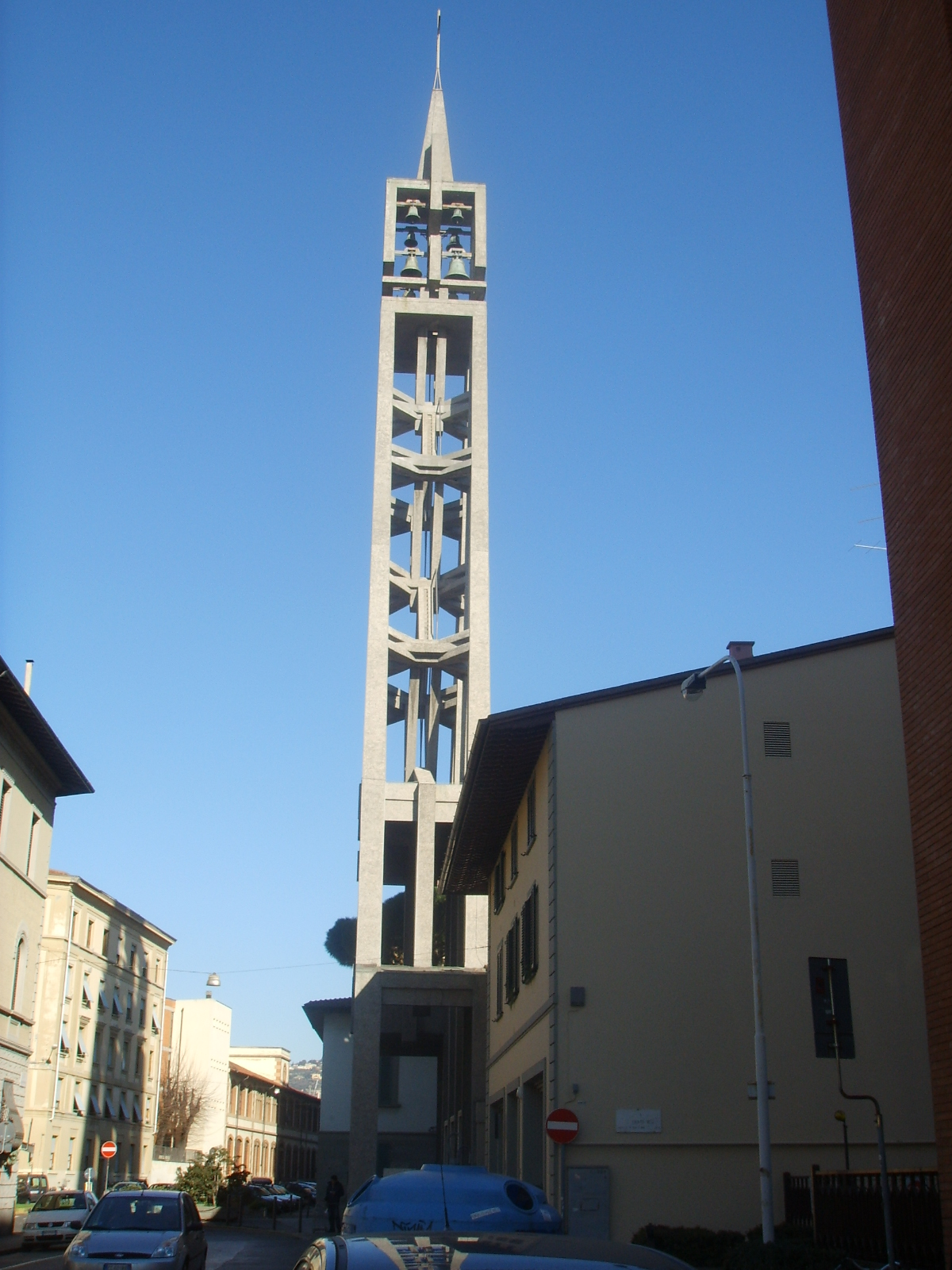
The distinctive structure of the bell tower

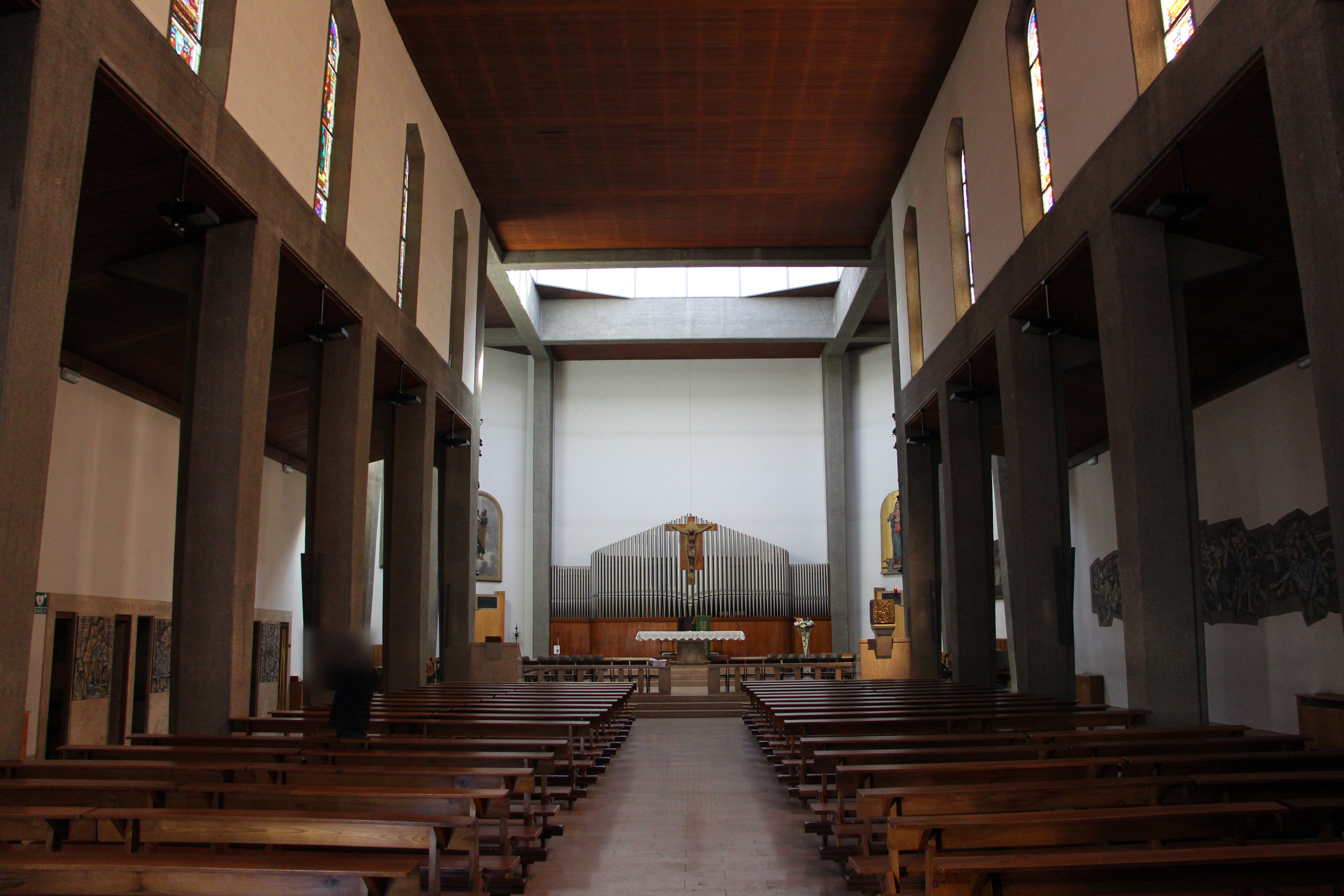
The nave

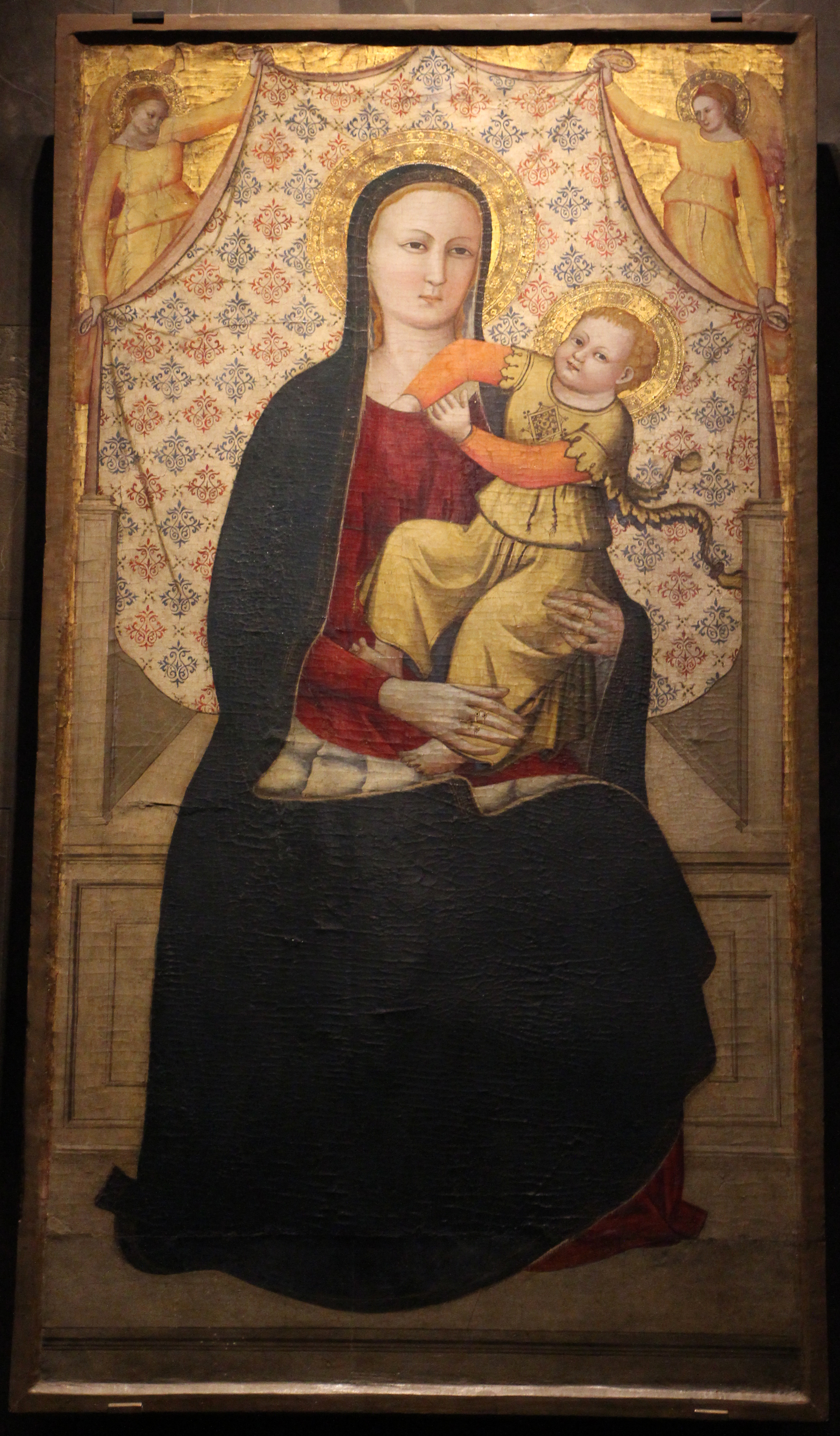
The Madonna col Bambino by the Master of San Martino a Mensola

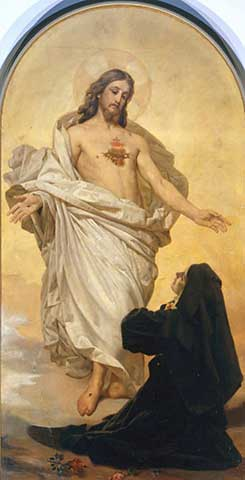
Visione del cuore di Gesù by Antonio Ciseri

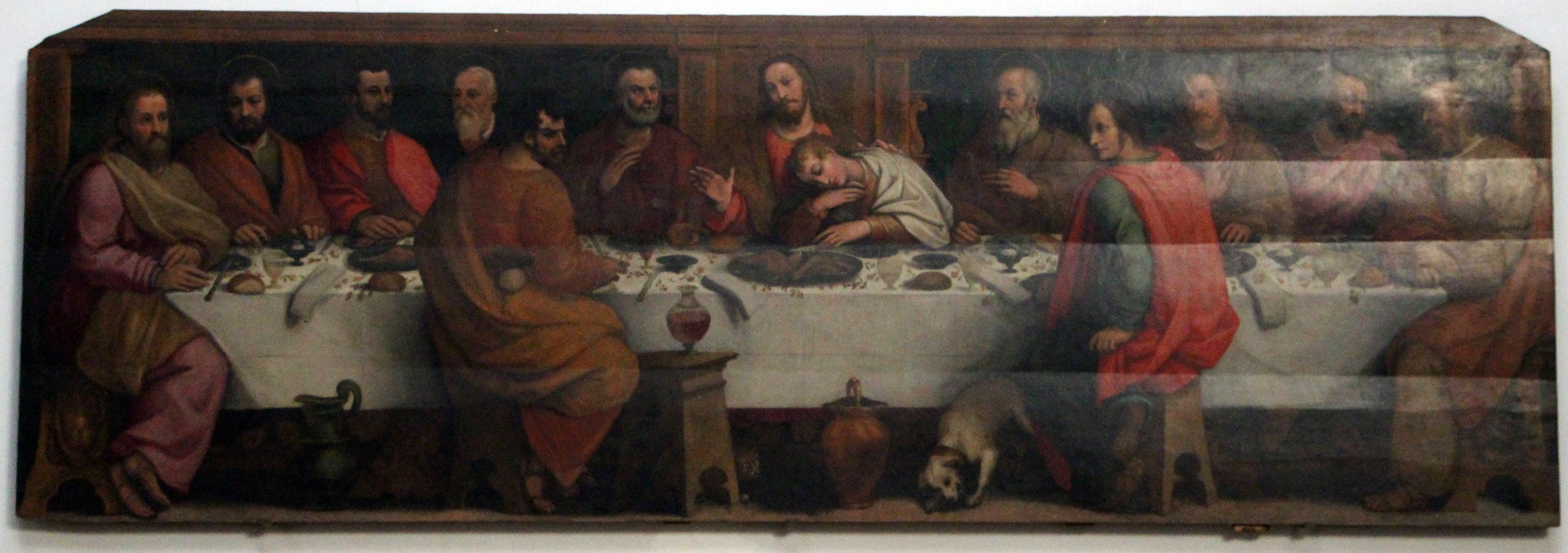
Ultima Cena by Giovanni Stradano
