= Former headquarters of Banca Monte Parma =

The former Sede Centrale della Banca del Monte di Parma was the headquarters of Banca Monte Parma, located in the corner of Piazzale Battisti and Strada Cavour in central Parma, Emilia-Romagna region, Italy. In 1978 the headquarters was moved to 1 Palazzo Sanvitale. The location on 3/A Strada Cavour remained as the main branch in the city. Since 2015 the building became a branch of Intesa Sanpaolo.

The Modernist-style building with an exterior of white marble and vertical windows was built from 1968 to 1974. The architects were a collaboration between Pier Luigi Nervi, Giovanni Ponti, Antonio Fornaroli, and Alberto Rosselli.
