= Giuseppe Giorgio Gori =

Italian architect (1906–1969)

- Born: 24 November 1906; Paris, France
- Died: 22 April 1969 (aged 62); Florence, Italy
- Education: University of Florence
- Occupation: Architect

Giuseppe Giorgio Gori (24 November 1906 – 22 April 1969) was an Italian architect.

== Life and career ==
Born in Paris in 1906 to the Florentine cabinetmaker Gregorio Gori, he settled in Florence in 1924. There, he attended the Royal Institute of Architecture, graduating in 1934. During his career, he worked with key figures in Florentine architecture scene of the 1950s and 1960s. In addition to his professional work, he was involved in academia, starting as an assistant to Giovanni Michelucci at the University of Florence and later serving as Dean of the Faculty from 1966 until his death in 1969.

== Works (selection) ==
- Casa Littoria in Donnini, Reggello (1940)
- National Educational Center, Florence (1941)
- Mercato dei Fiori (Flower Market), Pescia (1948–1951, with Emilio Brizzi, Enzo Gori, Leonardo Ricci, Leonardo Savioli)
- University Orthopedic Clinic, Perugia (1951–1954)
- Cassa di Risparmio di Firenze Headquarters, Florence (1952)
- Ponte Amerigo Vespucci, Florence (1954)
- Coverciano urban plan, Florence (1953)
- Hospital, Prato (1955–64, with Rolando Pagnini)
- Church of Santa Maria Assunta, Soliera Apuana (1957)
- Elementary School, Grosseto (1957–1961, with Rosario Vernuccio)
- Genio Civile Building, Pistoia (1959–1960)
- ACI Headquarters, Florence (1958)
- Customs Agency Building, Livorno (1959)
- Grosseto Courthouse, Grosseto (1959, with Vernuccio)
- "INA Casa" housing development in Ricciano, Pescia (1961)
- Affrico Overpass, Florence (1961, with Vernuccio)
- New Palazzo Della Ripa, Florence (1961–1962)
- Middle School, Prato (1962–1967, with Vernuccio)
- Ponte XX Settembre, Prato (1962–1965)
- Palazzo della Pretura, Pescia (1963)
- "Morgagni" Student Residence, Florence (1964–1968, with Vernuccio and Paolo Pettini)

== Sources ==
- Gabriella Carapelli (ed.). Giuseppe Giorgio Gori, 1906-1969. Inventario analitico dell'archivio conservato presso la Biblioteca di scienze tecnologiche. Florence: Edifir.
- Fabio Fabbrizzi (2016). Giuseppe Giorgio Gori. Opera completa. Florence: Edifir.
- Elisabetta Insabato; Cecilia Ghelli, eds. (2007). Guida agli archivi di architetti e ingegneri del Novecento in Toscana. Florence: Edifir. pp. 185–189.
- Giovanni Klaus Koenig (1968). Architettura in Toscana 1931-1968. Turin: ERI. pp. 197–198.
- Claudia Massi (2015). "L'opera architettonica di Giuseppe Giorgio Gori a Pescia" (PDF). Nebulae (58): 3–13.
