= Cintoia =

Locality in Tuscany, Italy

Coordinates: 43.6367°N 11.3411°E

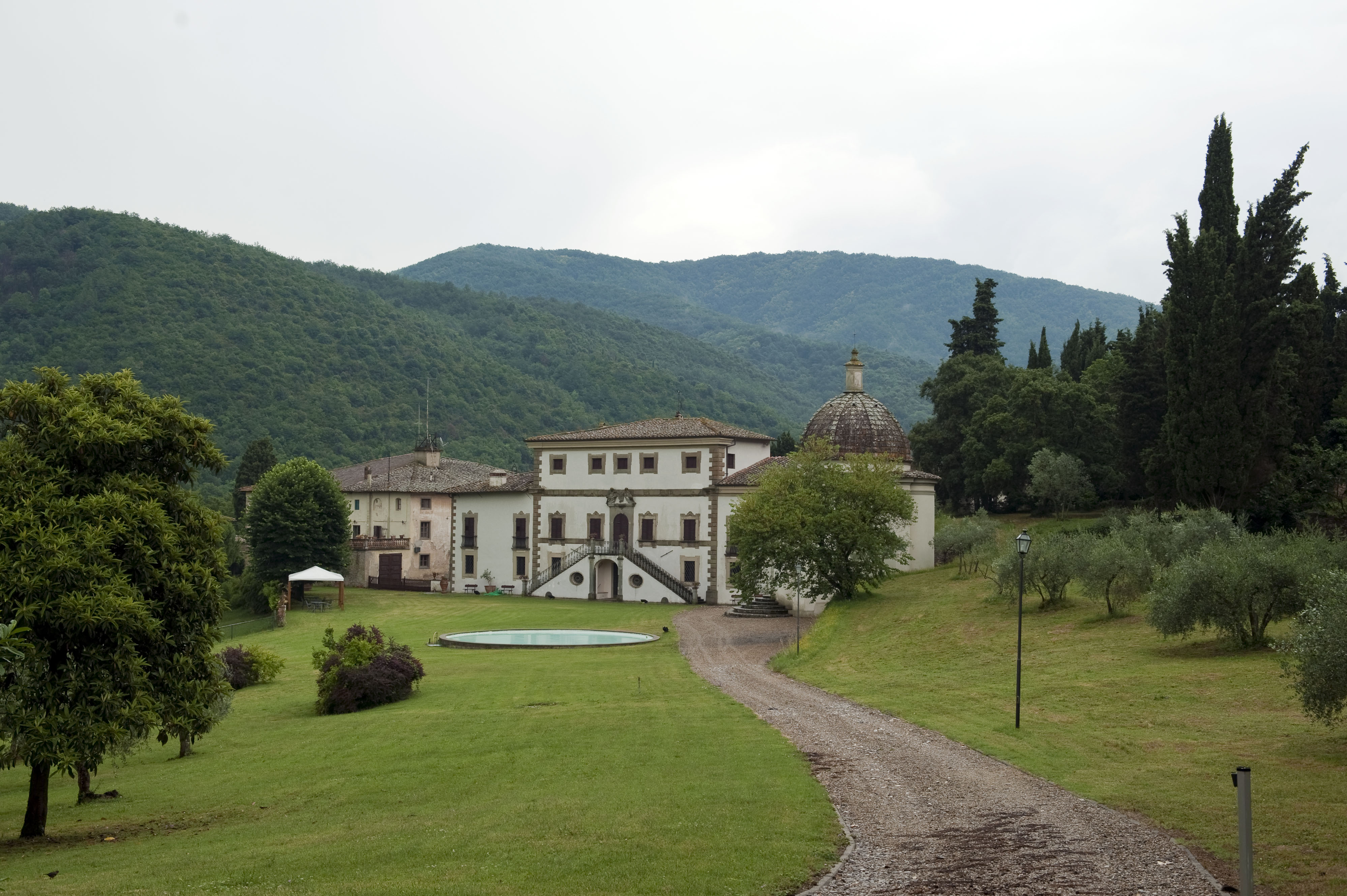
A villa in Cintoia

Cintoia is a locality in Greve in Chianti in Tuscany, Italy, between Florence and Siena.

The village of Cintoia and its church are near the old Cintoia Castle (Castello di Cintoia). The castle was originally a Longobard watchtower in the 10th century. The castle and village were abandoned until the late 20th century, when the houses were restored and converted into family housing.

The name of the village is well known for a brand of mineral water that is bottled in the area.
