= Pier Luigi Nervi =

Italian architect and engineer

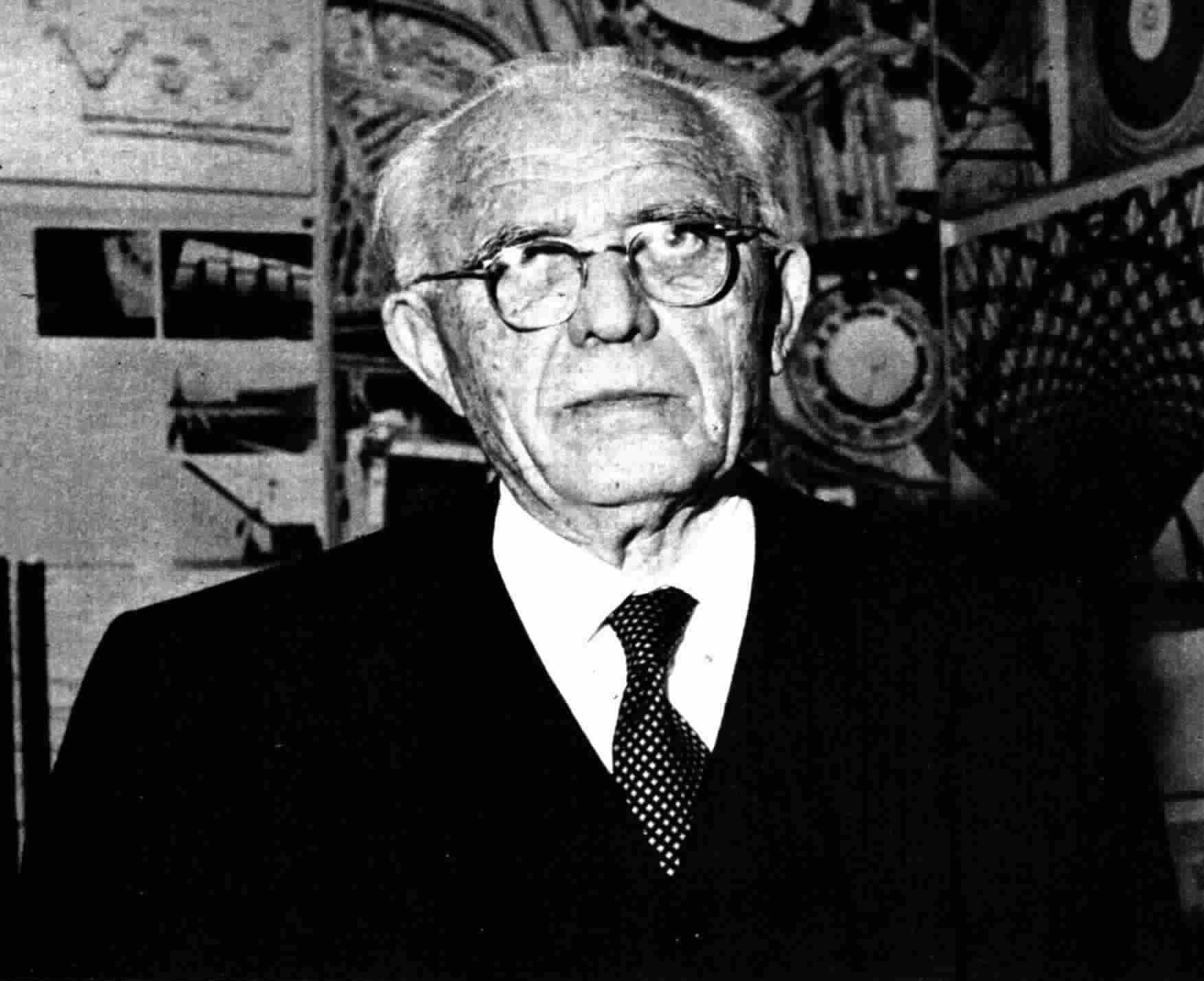
- Pier Luigi Nervi
- Born: 21 June 1891; Sondrio, Italy
- Died: 9 January 1979 (aged 87); Rome, Italy
- Education: University of Bologna
- Engineering career
- Discipline: Structural engineer, architect
- Institutions: Society for Concrete Construction; Institution of Structural Engineers
- Projects: Olympic Stadium in Rome (1960); UNESCO headquarters in Paris (1950); Hangar in Orvieto (1935)
- Awards: IStructE Gold Medal; Wilhelm Exner Medal (1957); AIA Gold Medal (1964)

Pier Luigi Nervi (21 June 1891 – 9 January 1979) was an Italian engineer and architect. He studied at the University of Bologna graduating in 1913. Nervi taught as a professor of engineering at Rome University from 1946 to 1961 and was known as a structural engineer and architect and for his innovative use of reinforced concrete, especially with numerous notable thin shell structures worldwide.

== Biography ==
Nervi was born in Sondrio and attended the Civil Engineering School of Bologna from which he graduated in 1913; his formal education was quite similar to that experienced today by Italian civil engineering students. After graduating he joined the Society for Concrete Construction and, during World War I from 1915 to 1918, he served in the Corps of Engineering of the Italian Army. From 1961 to 1962 he was the Norton professor at Harvard University.

== Civil engineering works ==
Nervi began practicing civil engineering after 1923. His projects in the 1930s included several airplane hangars that were important for his development as an engineer. A set of hangars in Orvieto (1935) were built entirely out of reinforced concrete, and a second set in Orbetello and Torre del Lago (1939) improved the design by using a lighter roof, precast ribs, and a modular construction method.

During the 1940s he developed ideas for reinforced concrete which helped in the rebuilding of many buildings and factories throughout Western Europe, and even designed and created a boat hull that was made of reinforced concrete as a promotion for the Italian government.

Nervi also stressed that intuition should be used as much as mathematics in design, especially with thin shell structures. He borrowed from both Roman and Renaissance architecture while applying ribbing and vaulting to improve strength and eliminate columns. He combined simple geometry and prefabrication to innovate design solutions.

== Engineer and architect ==
Nervi was educated and practised as an ingegnere edile (translated as "building engineer") – in Italy. At the time, a building engineer might also be considered an architect. After 1932, his aesthetically pleasing designs were used for major projects. This was due to the booming number of construction projects at the time which used concrete and steel in Europe and the architecture aspect took a step back to the potential of engineering. Nervi successfully made reinforced concrete the main structural material of the day. Nervi expounded his ideas on building in four books (see below) and many learned papers.

Archaeological excavations suggested that he may have been partly responsible for the Flaminio stadium foundations passing through ancient Roman tombs. His work was also part of the architecture event in the art competition at the 1936 Summer Olympics.

== International projects ==
Most of his built structures are in his native Italy, but he also worked on projects abroad. Nervi's first project in the United States was the George Washington Bridge Bus Station, for which he designed the roof, which consists of triangular pieces that were cast in place. This building is still used today by over 700 buses and their passengers.

== Noted works ==
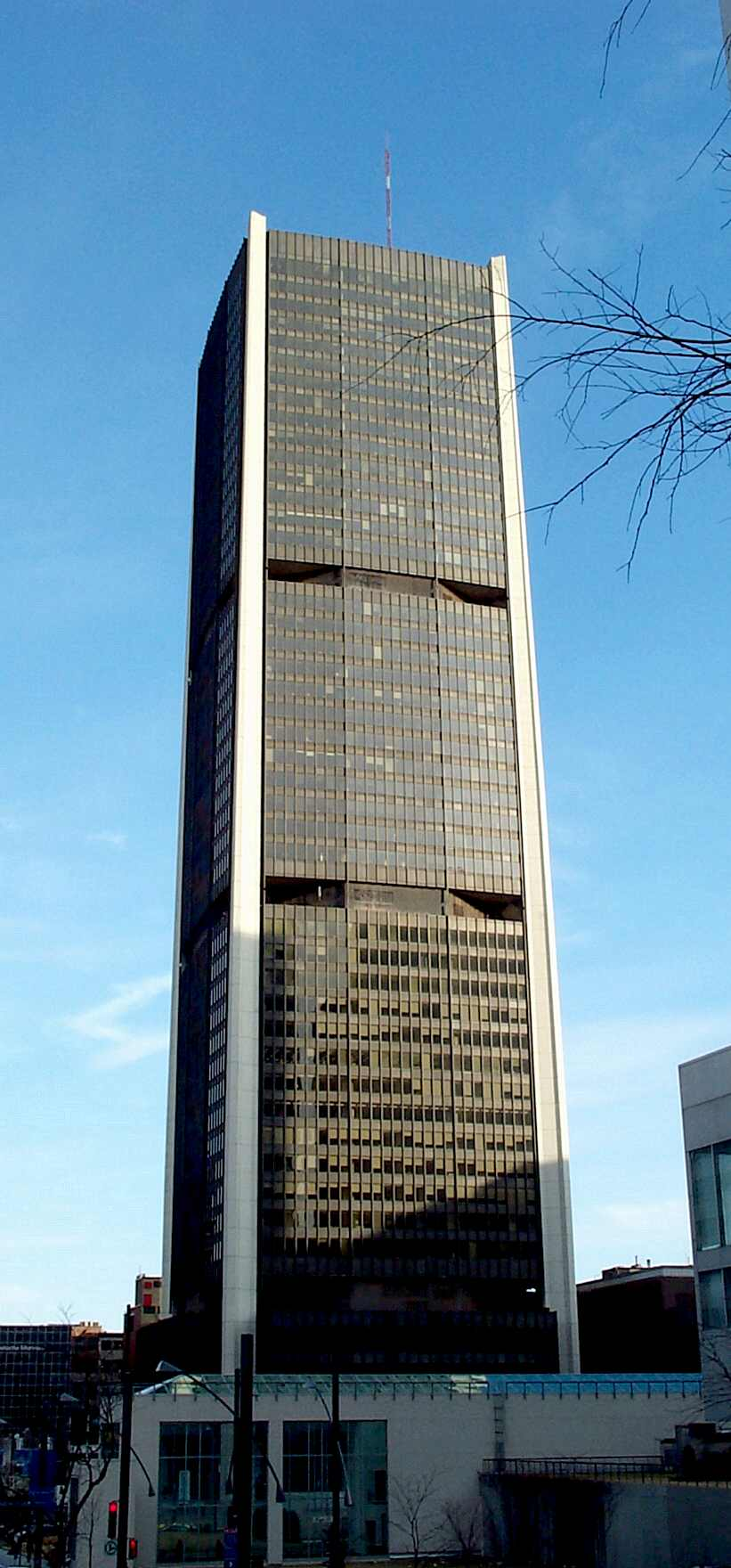
The Tour de la Bourse in Montreal (1964)

- Stadio Artemio Franchi, Florence (1931)
- Ugolino Golf House, Impruneta, Italy (1934) (collaborating with Gherardo Bosio)
- Torino Esposizioni, Turin, Italy (1949).
- UNESCO headquarters, Paris (1950) (collaborating with Marcel Breuer and Bernard Zehrfuss)
- The Pirelli Tower, Milan (1950) (collaborating with Gio Ponti)
- Palazzo dello sport EUR (now PalaLottomatica), Rome (1956)
- Palazzetto dello sport, Rome (1958)
- Stadio Flaminio, Rome (1957)
- Palazzo del Lavoro, Turin (1961)
- Palazzetto dello sport, Turin (1961)
- Australia Square tower building, Sydney (1961–1967)
- Sacro Cuore (Bell Tower), Firenze (1962)
- Paper Mill, Mantua, Italy (1962)
- George Washington Bridge Bus Station, New York City (1963)
- Australia Square tower, Sydney (1964) Architect: Harry Seidler & Associates
- Tour de la Bourse, Montreal (1964) (collaborating with Luigi Moretti)
- Leverone Field House at Dartmouth College
- Sede Centrale della Banca del Monte di Parma, Parma (1968, collaboration with Gio Ponti, Antonio Fornaroli, and Alberto Rosselli)
- Edmund Barton Building (also published as Trade Group Offices), Canberra (1970), Australia. Architect Harry Seidler & Associates
- MLC Centre, Sydney (1973) Architect: Harry Seidler & Associates
- Thompson Arena at Dartmouth College (1973–1974)
- Cathedral of Saint Mary of the Assumption, San Francisco, California (1967) (collaborating with Pietro Belluschi)
- Paul VI Audience Hall, Vatican City (1971)
- Chrysler Hall, & Norfolk Scope Arena in Norfolk, Virginia (1971)
- Australian Embassy, Paris (1973) Consulting engineer. Architect. Harry Seidler & Associates.
- Good Hope Centre, Cape Town (1976) by Studio Nervi, an exhibition hall and conference centre, with the exhibition hall comprising an arch with tie-beam on each of the four vertical facades and two diagonal arches supporting two intersecting barrel-like roofs which in turn were constructed from pre-cast concrete triangular coffers with in-situ concrete beams on the edges.
Pirelli Tower

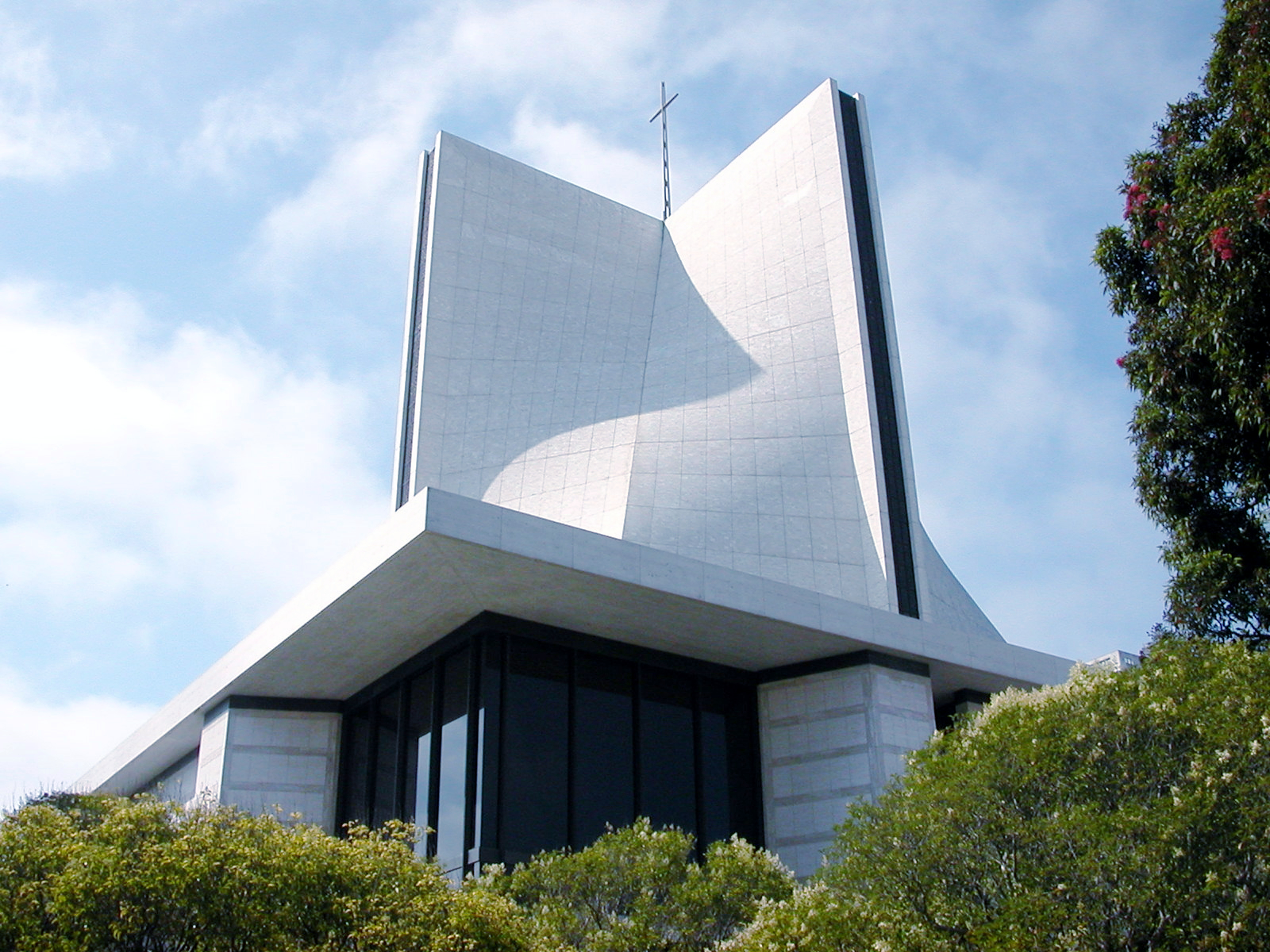
Cathedral of Saint Mary of the Assumption

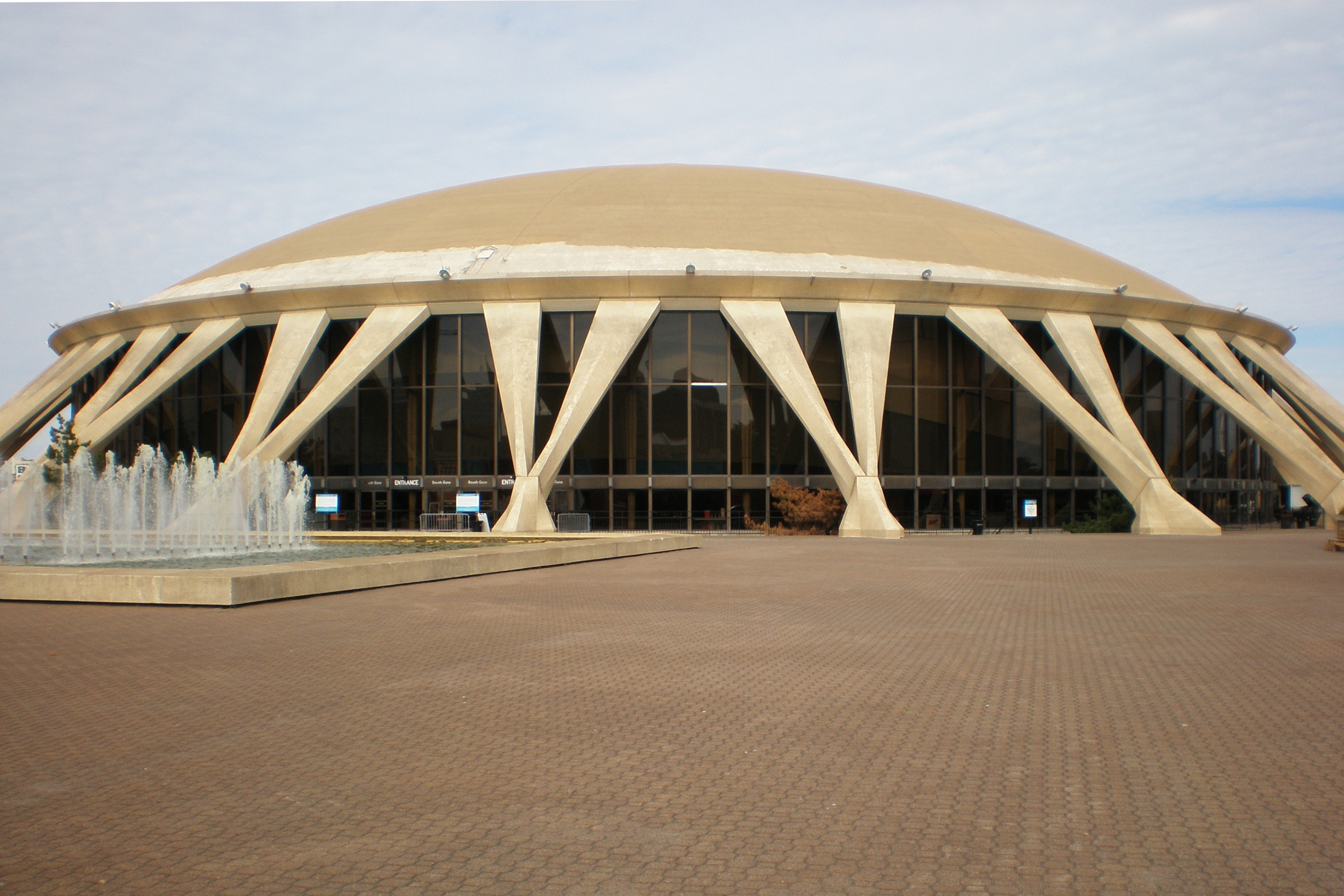
Norfolk Scope

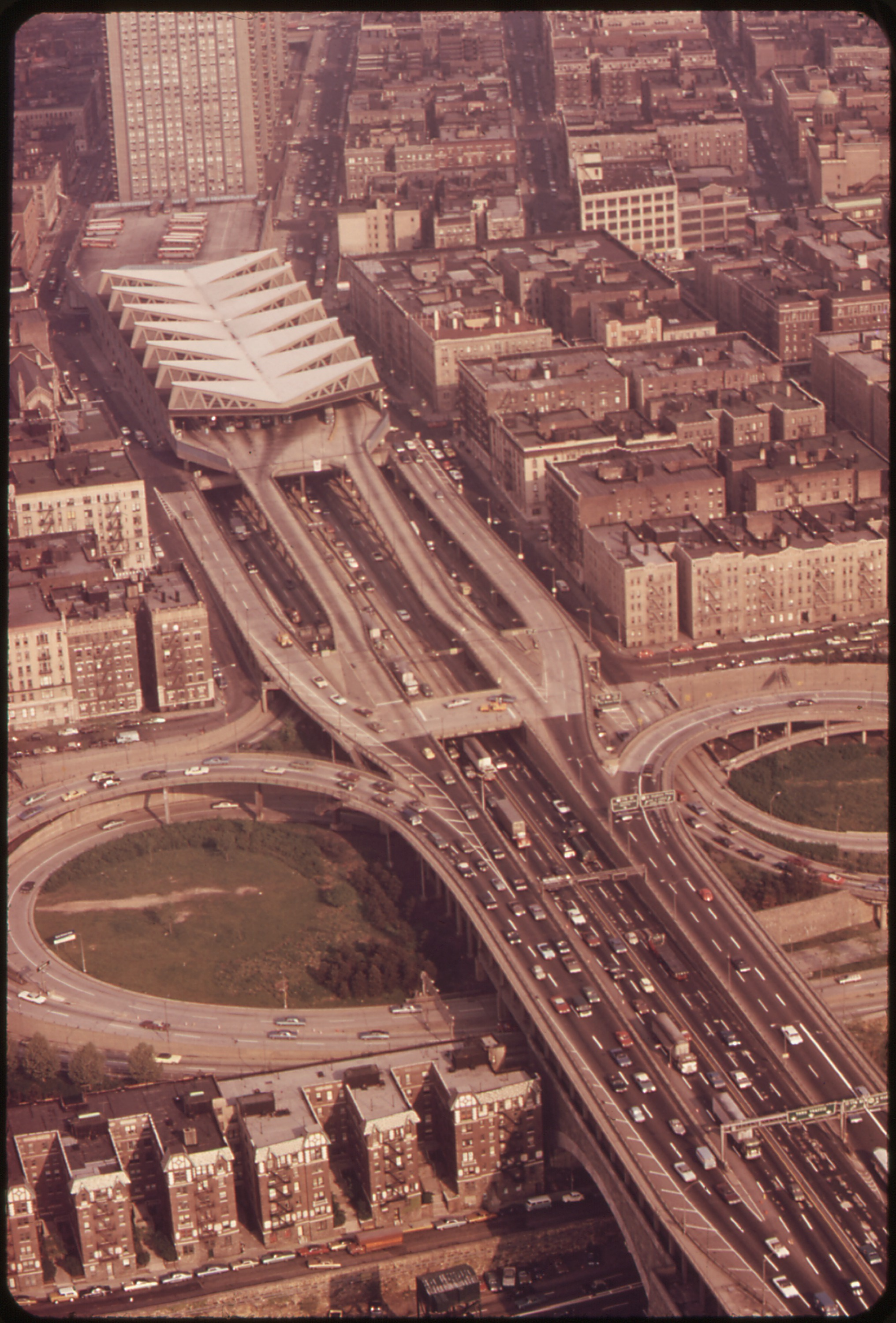
George Washington Bridge Bus Station

== Awards ==
Pier Luigi Nervi was awarded Gold Medals by the Institution of Structural Engineers in the UK, the American Institute of Architects (AIA Gold Medal 1964) and the RIBA.

In 1957, received the Frank P. Brown Medal of The Franklin Institute and the Wilhelm Exner Medal.

== Publications ==
- Scienza o arte del costruire? Bussola, Rome, 1945.
- Costruire correttamente, Hoepli, Milan, 1954.
- Structures, Dodge, New York, 1958.
- Aesthetics and Technology in Building (The Charles Eliot Norton Lectures, 1961–62). Cambridge, Massachusetts, Harvard University Press, 1965.

== See also ==
- Thin-shell structure
