= Lando Bartoli =

Italian architect and urban planner (1914–2002)

- Born: 27 March 1914; Livorno, Kingdom of Italy
- Died: 6 January 2002 (aged 87); Florence, Italy
- Occupations: Architect, urban planner, academic

Lando Bartoli (27 March 1914 – 6 January 2002) was an Italian architect, urban planner and academic. He is best known for his post-war reconstruction work in Florence, his contributions to urban planning in Tuscany, and his restoration projects carried out while serving as director of the Opificio delle Pietre Dure during the 1950s.

== Life and career ==
Born in Livorno, Bartoli was the son of the sculptor Umberto Bartoli. He studied architecture in Florence, graduating in 1937 with a thesis on the urban redevelopment of his native city.

After serving in the Italian Army during World War II, Bartoli joined the Allied-led programme for the recovery and conservation of artworks damaged during the conflict. He participated in the structural consolidation of the Uffizi following the destruction around the Ponte Vecchio in 1944.

Bartoli taught architectural drawing and architectural design at the University of Florence for several decades. Between 1950 and 1959 he directed the Opificio delle Pietre Dure, overseeing restoration projects including works at Florence Cathedral, Orvieto Cathedral and the Basilica of Santa Chiara in Naples. He also served on the Florence City Council and was assessor for public works in the administration of mayor Giorgio La Pira.

Among his architectural works are the church of Santa Cristina at Pagnana, the church of the Sacred Heart in Florence (with Pier Luigi Nervi), the Hotel Majestic in Florence, and numerous residential and civic buildings throughout Tuscany.

Bartoli died in Florence in 2002.

== Archives ==
Bartoli's professional archive, consisting of architectural drawings, project documentation and personal papers, is preserved at the University of Florence.

== Sources ==
- Bartoli, Leandro Maria (2005). "Lando Bartoli". In Rogari, Sandro (ed.). L'Università degli studi di Firenze fra istituzioni e cultura nel decennale della scomparsa di Giovanni Spadolini. Florence: Firenze University Press. pp. 105–113.
- Insabato, Elisabetta; Ghelli, Cecilia, eds. (2007). Guida agli archivi di architetti e ingegneri del Novecento in Toscana. Florence: Edifir. pp. 38–42.
- Bargellini, Piero; Guarnieri, Ennio (1986). Le strade di Firenze (2nd ed.). Florence: Bonechi.
- Bartoli, Lando (1994). Il disegno della cupola del Brunelleschi. Florence: Olschki.
