= Cassa di Risparmio di Piacenza e Vigevano =

- Native name: Cassa di Risparmio di Piacenza e Vigevano S.p.A.
- Company type: private società per azioni
- Industry: Financial services
- Predecessor: Cassa di Risparmio di Piacenza; Cassa di Risparmio di Vigevano
- Founded: 18 August 1860 (Piacenza); 4 September 1857 (Vigevano); 23 December 1991 (spin off)
- Defunct: 31 December 1992
- Fate: merged with Cariparma
- Successor: Fondazione di Piacenza e Vigevano; Cassa di Risparmio di Parma e Piacenza
- Headquarters: 18 via Poggiali, Piacenza, Italy
- Services: Retail and corporate banking
- Owner: Fondazione di Piacenza e Vigevano
- Parent: Fondazione di Piacenza e Vigevano

Cassa di Risparmio di Piacenza e Vigevano was an Italian savings bank based in Piacenza, Emilia-Romagna, as well as a second office in Vigevano, Lombardy. Despite the bank ceased to be exist, the former owner of the bank still operated as a charity organization.

== History ==
Cassa di Risparmio di Piacenza e Vigevano was a merger of the saving banks (Italian: Cassa di Risparmio) of Piacenza and Vigevano, found in 1860 (as part of Monte di Pietà di Piacenza) and 1857 respectively. Due to Legge Amato, Cassa di Risparmio di Piacenza e Vigevano became two entity, società per azioni and the foundation in December 1991, with the latter acted as a charity organization. The foundation sold a minority interests to the holding company Casse Emiliano Romagnole (CAER), which the foundation in turn became a minority owner of CAER. The bank also recapitalized 24,022,900,000 lire in January 1992. However, the bank withdrew in order to favour another merger with Cassa di Risparmio di Parma in December 1992.

== See also ==
- List of banks in Italy
