= Edoardo Detti =

Italian architect (1913–1984)

- Born: 16 January 1913; Florence, Kingdom of Italy
- Died: 24 December 1984 (aged 71); Florence, Tuscany, Italy
- Education: University of Florence
- Occupations: Architect, urban planner

Edoardo Detti (16 January 1913 – 24 December 1984) was an Italian architect and urban planner.

== Life and career ==
Born in Florence into a family from Casentino, Detti graduated in Architecture in 1940 under Giovanni Michelucci, becoming his assistant. During World War II, he served as an officer and partisan in the resistance movement after 8 September 1943. He actively participated in the reconstruction of Florence, contributing to projects such as the recovery of Ponte Vecchio, Ponte San Niccolò, and the Ponte alle Grazie, the latter inaugurated in 1957.

Detti dedicated himself to architecture and urban planning, becoming a professor at the University of Florence from 1944, and president of the National Institute of Urban Planning in 1970. He also served as the assessor for urban planning in the Florence municipal executive led by Giorgio La Pira, from 1961 to 1964, drafting the city's master plan.

As an architect, he closely collaborated with Carlo Scarpa, designing significant projects such as the renovation of the Grand Hotel Minerva (1959–1961), the reconstruction of the church of San Giovanni Battista in Firenzuola (1959–1966), and the headquarters of Nuova Italia Editrice (1968–1972). Other notable works included the Massa Courthouse and the Industrial Technical Institute "Enrico Mattei" in Urbino.

== Sources ==
- Philippe Duboy, ed. (1993). Edoardo Detti (1913-1984) architetto e urbanista. Dilemma sul futuro di Firenze. Milan: Electa.
- Ezio Godoli, ed. (2001). Architetture del Novecento: la Toscana. Florence: Polistampa. pp. 113–118.
- Elisabetta Insabato; Cecilia Ghelli, eds. (2007). Guida agli archivi di architetti e ingegneri del Novecento in Toscana. Florence: Edifir. pp. 162–172.
- Giovanni Klaus Koenig (1968). Architettura in Toscana 1931-1968. Turin: ERI.
- Caterina Lisini; Francesca Mugnai (2013). Edoardo Detti architetto e urbanista 1913-1984. Archivio (PDF). Parma: Diabasi.
- Francesca Mugnai (2010). Edoardo Detti e Carlo Scarpa. Realismo e incanto. Reggio Emilia: Diabasis.
