= Ferdinando Poggi (architect) =

Italian architect and engineer (1902–1986)

- Born: 15 February 1902; Brescia, Kingdom of Italy
- Died: October 1986 (aged 84); Florence, Italy
- Occupations: Architect, engineer

Ferdinando Poggi (15 February 1902 – October 1986) was an Italian architect and engineer mainly active in Tuscany and in Albania during the Italian occupation.

== Life and career ==
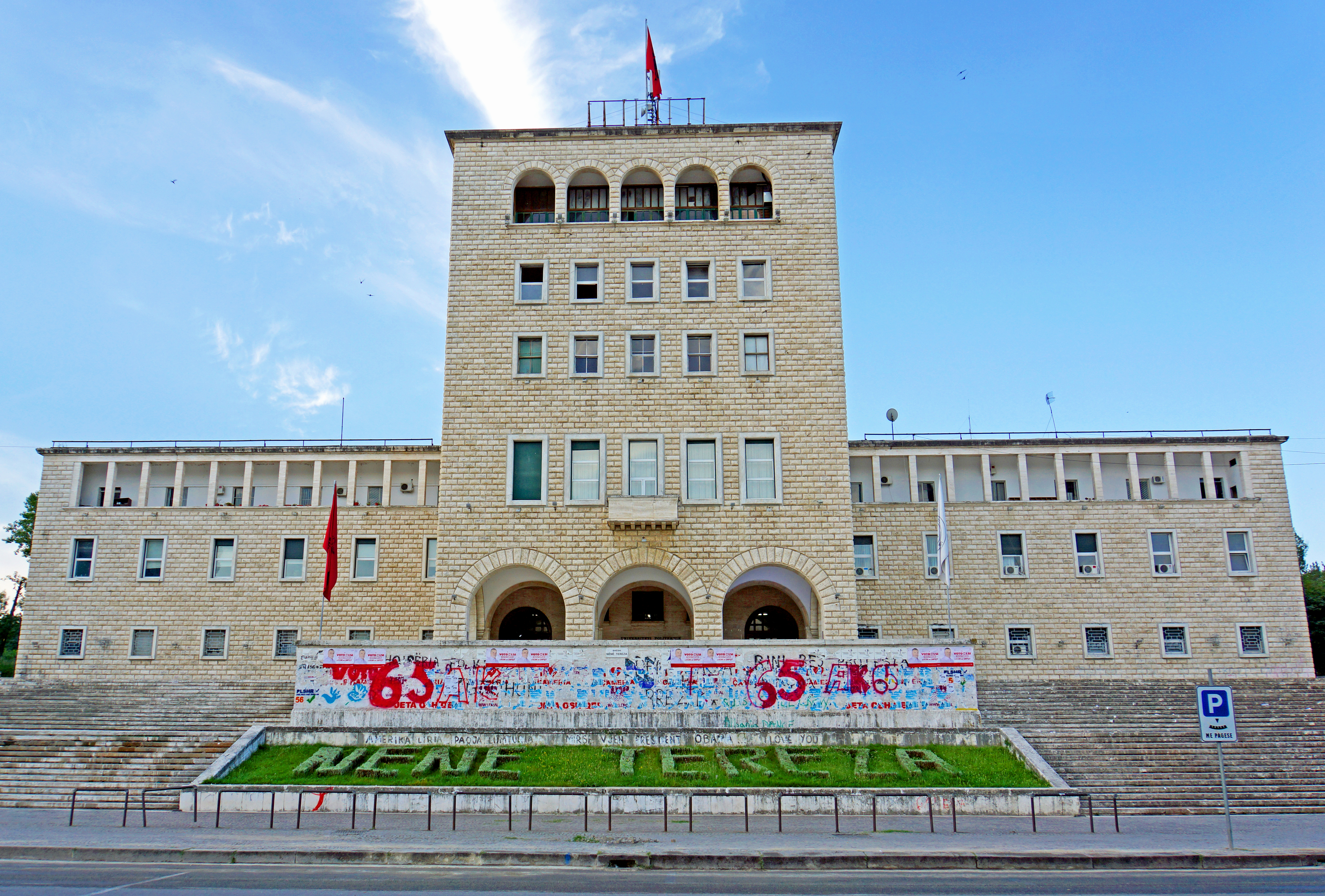
The former Casa del Fascio in Tirana

Ferdinando Poggi was the son of Giuseppina Canonico, daughter of magistrate Tancredi Canonico, and Leone Poggi (1867–1953), a civil engineer, and grandson of Enrico Poggi (1812–1890), magistrate and Minister of Justice of the Tuscan government. His great-uncle Giuseppe Poggi was the architect responsible for major urban works during the period when Florence became the capital of Italy.

He graduated in civil engineering in Rome in 1924. During the 1930s, he directed construction works for the Istituto Benito Mussolini in Rome and the Istituto Nazionale Fascista della Previdenza Sociale in Padua.

During World War II, he worked in Albania alongside architect Gherardo Bosio on the transformation of the Villa Reale in Tirana for the Italian Ministry of Foreign Affairs. He also designed the Casa del Fascio.

After the war, Poggi focused on restoration and renovation projects in Florence and across Tuscany.

Poggi died in Florence in 1986.
