= Complex of San Firenze =

Baroque-style building in Florence, Tuscany, Italy

Coordinates: 43°46′10.5″N 11°15′28.0″E

The Complesso di San Firenze (Complex of San Firenze) is a 17th-century Baroque-style building, consisting of a church, palace, and former oratory, located on the southeast corner of the saucer-shaped piazza of San Firenze, located in the quartiere of Santa Croce in central Florence, region of Tuscany, Italy. The buildings were commissioned by the Oratorians of Saint Philip Neri.

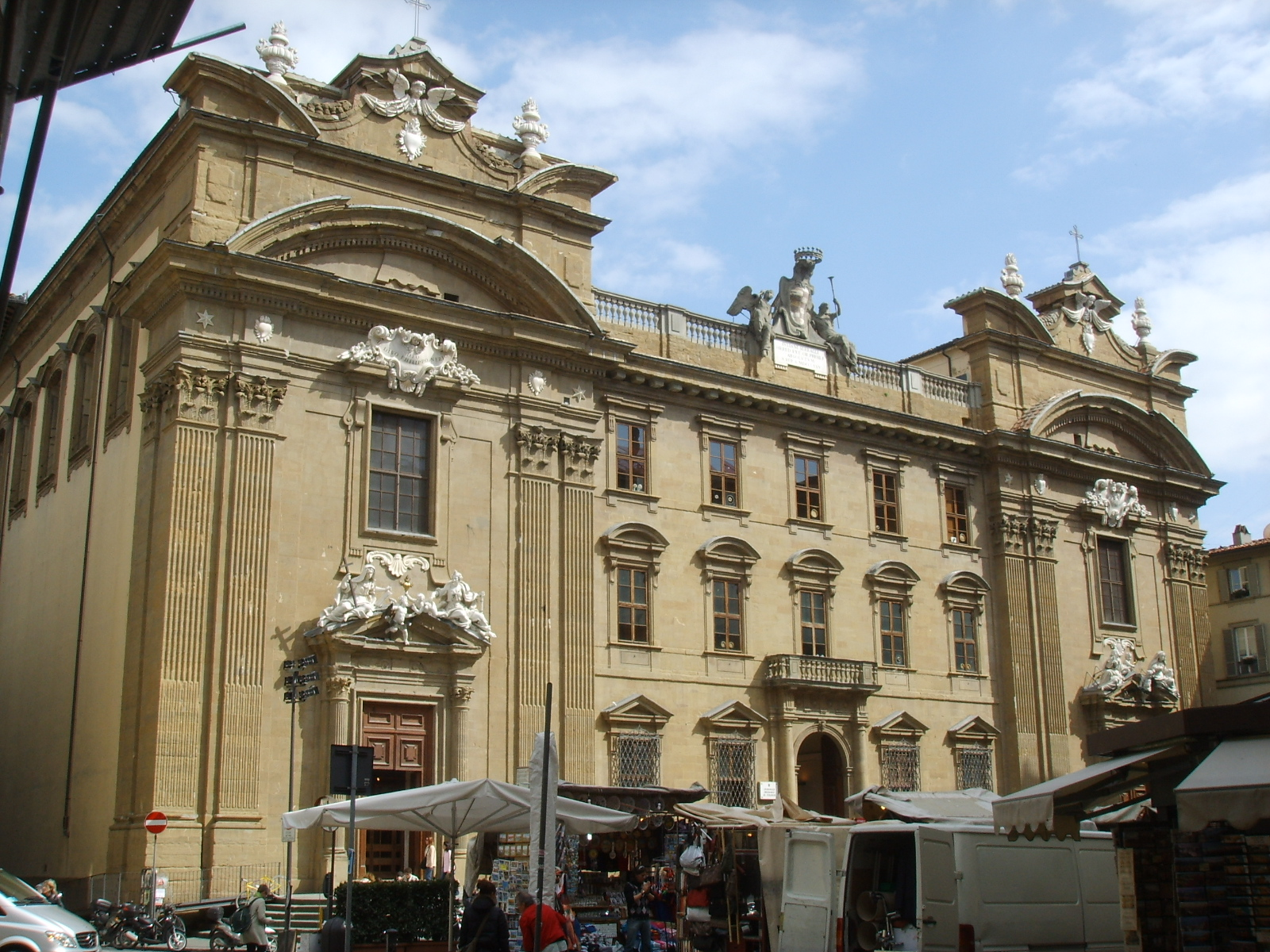
Facade of Oratory-Seminary (Court)-Church

== History ==
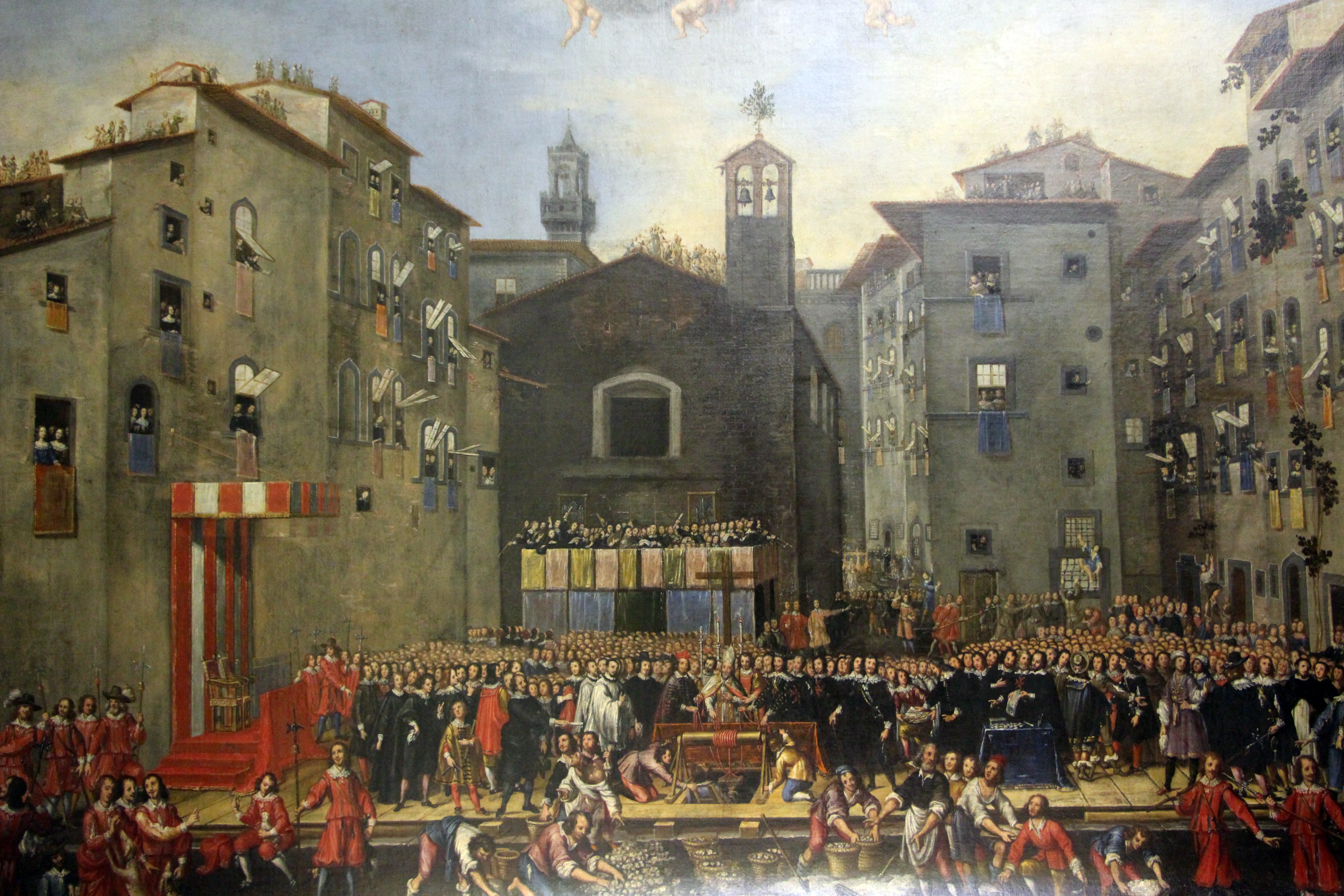
View of Piazza San Firenze, prior to construction of the Oratorian complex.

Prior to the 17th-century, paintings of the Piazza depict a drab 12th-century Romanesque brick church of San Florenzio hemmed by tall medieval houses. The Oratorians acquired the church in the 1640s, and commissioned plans from Pier Francesco Silvani to construct an oratory. Construction began in 1645 with the attendance of the Grand-Duke and of the Cardinal Giancarlo de' Medici.

Once the oratory was complete in 1648, the Oratorians received a further endowment from the son of Senator Giuliano de' Serragli, who commissioned an additional church from the Baroque architect Pietro da Cortona. The design of Cortona with two parallel flanking rectangular facades called for the acquisition of other buildings in the square.

The plan was reformulated over time, and by 1715 construction of the new church facade was completed by Ferdinando Ruggieri. The matching oratory facade was built from 1772 to 1775 by Zanobi Del Rosso. Others involved in the designs and construction were Gioacchino Fortini and Filippo Ciocchi.

This led to the present nearly symmetric arrangement of the church on the north wing, the former seminary and housing in the center, and the oratory on the south wing. In 1848, the church was rededicated to the Immaculate Conception and Phillip Neri.

The Seminary has undergone a number of transitions, ebbing with the fortunes of the founding order. The Oratorian seminary was suppressed transiently in 1769, re-suppressed in 1808, but again returned to the order in 1814. By 1866, when Florence had been chosen the capital of Italy, the building was requisitioned by the state for office space. Restructuring and expansion of the seminary was conducted by Marco Treves and Paolo Comotto.

The entire building suffered damage during the 1966 floods. In 2015, it housed civil courts of Florence, but was used for other functions. The Oratory is used for events and concerts, while the church retains its original function.

== External decoration ==
The scenographic facade is notable for the two advanced wings, church on right, and oratory on left, each flanked by monumental corinthian columns. The portals have triangular pediments with white marble sculptures of leaning allegories: Faith and Hope with putti holding aloft the Sacred Heart, sculpted by Giovacchino Fortini in the church, while Prayer and Humility with putti holding a star, sculpted by Pompilio Ticciati and Giovanni Nobili (sculptor) grace the Oratory. The center of the seminary is crowned by two trumpet-bearing angels holding the coat of arms of the Serragli family.

== Interior decoration ==
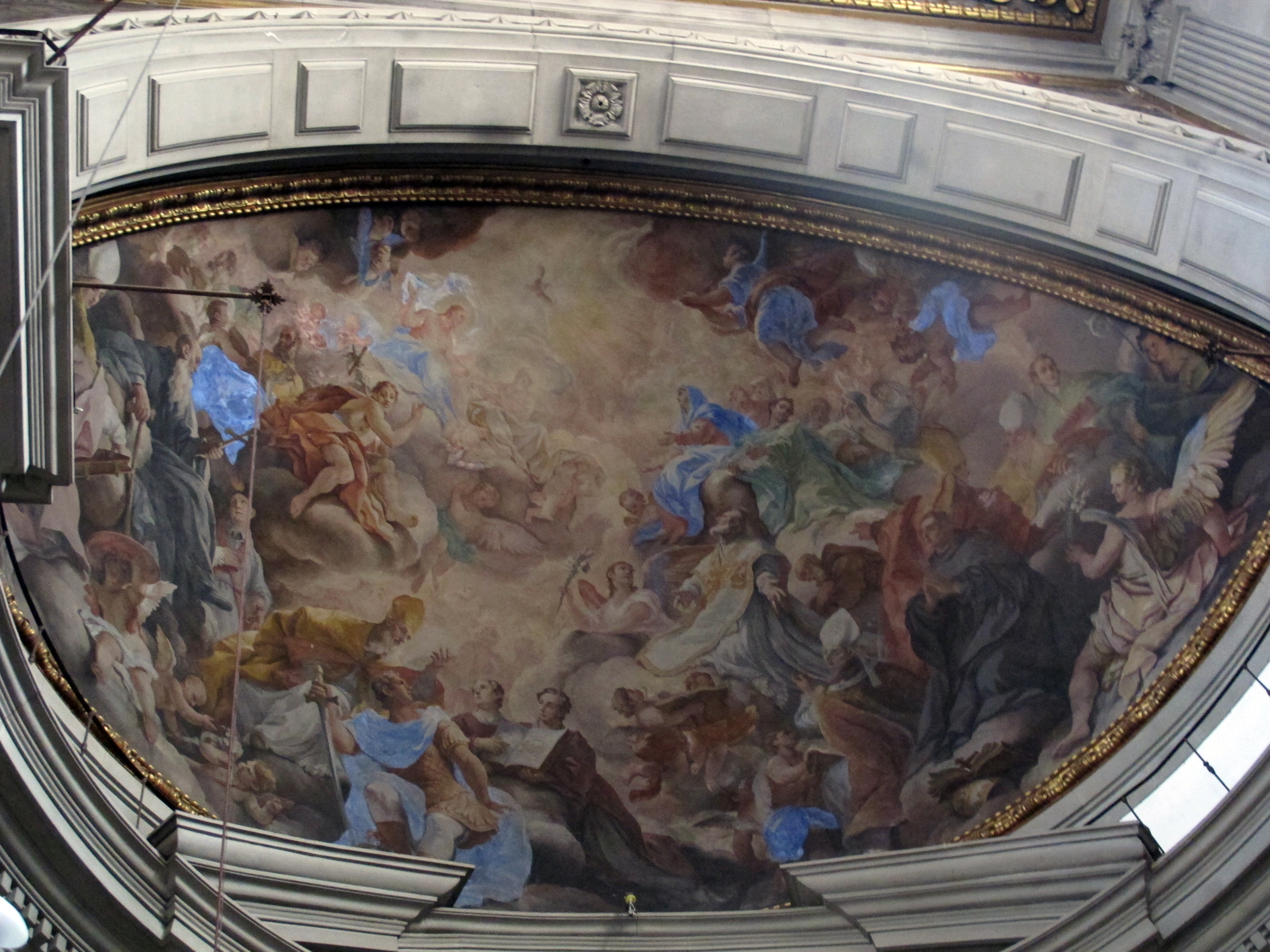
Lapi fresco of Trinity with Apostles and Florentine Saints

The interior ceiling has a large canvas depicting the Glory of San Filippo Neri by Matteo Bonechi. The elaborate and costly stucco work of the nave was completed between 1668 and 1673 by a team of artists.

The Chapel of the Madonna has a Virgin by Carlo Maratta and an Eleven Thousand Martyrs by Stradanus, which had been in the earlier church of San Firenze. The chapel cupola has frescoes by Luigi Sabatelli. The chapel was designed by Zanobi del Rosso, and once had a canvas attributed to Francesco Bacchiacca.

The apse and altars of the church were designed by Fortini. He also completed the statues in the presbytery of Charity and Purity, and the bas-reliefs of the Life of St Phillip Neri. Other works are by Antonio Montauti. Other paintings in the church are by Giuseppe Pinzani, Tommaso Redi, Antonio Puglieschi, Anton Domenico Gabbiani, S and G Perini. The ceiling of the oratory, designed by Silvani has a canvas of Giovanni Camillo Sagrestani depicting the Glory of St Phillip. The apse has a large fresco depicting the Trinity with Apostles and Florentine Saints, by Niccolò Lapi.
