= Giuseppe Moriani =

Italian painter

Giuseppe Moriani was an Italian painter of the Baroque period, active mainly in Tuscany in the late 17th and early 18th century.

He was strongly influenced by Giovanni Camillo Sagrestani. He painted the Story of Santa Verdiana in the church of Santa Verdiana in Castelfiorentino, in collaboration with Sagrestani, Ranieri del Pace, Niccolò Lapi, Antonio Puglieschi, and Agostino Veracini. In the museum of sacred art in Greve in Chianti, is Moriani's Healing of the blind since birth. He painted the canvases of Miracles of San Francesco di Paola for the Church of San Francesco di Paola, Florence.

== Legacy ==
His artworks, including Allegoria della Meditazione and Hercules and Omphale, went on public auctions multiple times.
