= Oratory of St Thomas Aquinas, Florence =

Church building in Florence, Italy

Coordinates: 43°46′22.89″N 11°15′40.30″E

Oratory of St Thomas Aquinas
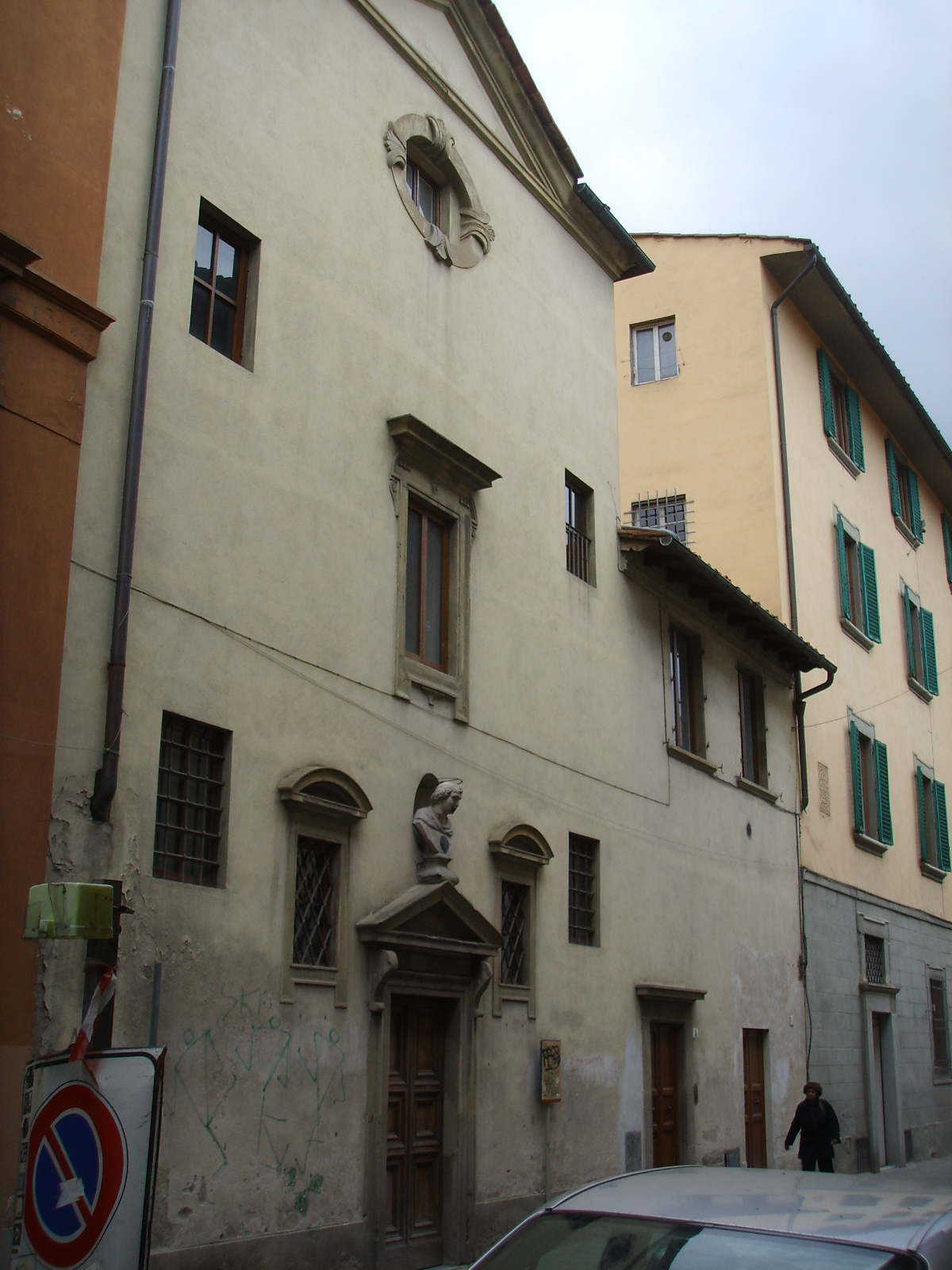

Religion
- Affiliation: Roman Catholic
- Province: Florence

Location
- Location: Florence, Italy
- Interactive map of Oratory of St Thomas Aquinas

Architecture
- Architect: Santi di Tito
- Type: Church
- Style: Renaissance
- Completed: 1568

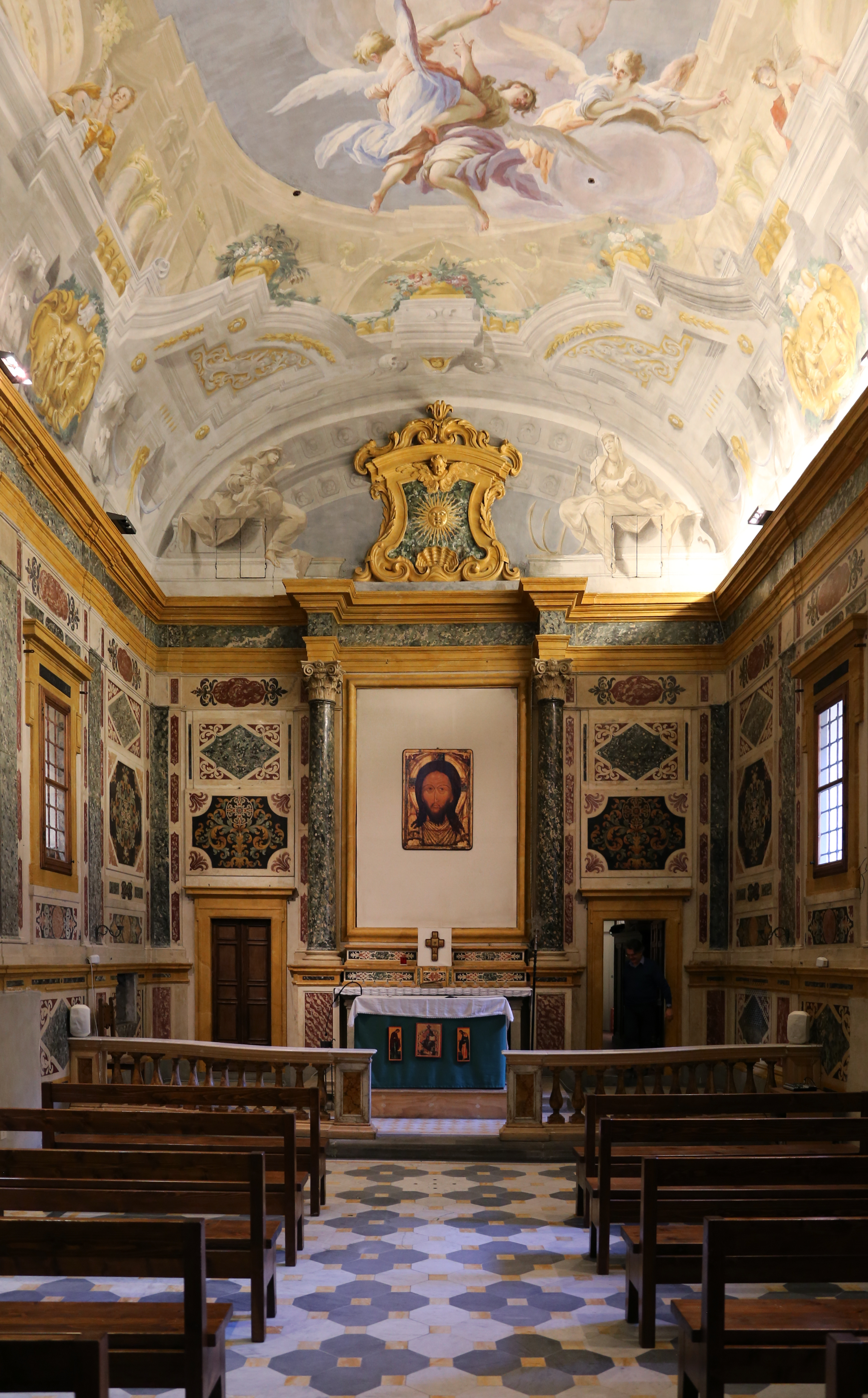
Interior with new altarpiece

The Oratory of St. Thomas Aquinas is a late-Renaissance-style, Roman Catholic oratory or prayer hall located on Via della Pergola in Florence, region of Tuscany, Italy.

== History ==
The simple facade stands across the street from the Hospital of Santa Maria Nuova; it was initially the site of the Congregation of the Noble Contemplatives (Congregazione dei Contemplanti dei Nobili), founded by a Dominican friar, named fra Santi di Cini, from the Convent of San Marco. In 1568, the painter Santi di Tito, designed the oratory for the confraternity, and it was dedicated it to St Thomas Aquinas. Santi also painted the altarpiece of the Crucifixion and St Thomas Aquinas (in restoration). The vestibule has quadratura painted in 1782 by the painters Grix and Stagi. The altar has walls decorated in elaborate and fine scagiole by Carlo Ghibertoni. The ceiling was decorated in 1710 with quadratura by Rinaldo Botti, and depicts the Glory of St Thomas painted by Camillo Sagrestani and Ranieri del Pace. In the seventeenth century, the oratory became a hospice for pilgrims, and in 1775, rites were suppressed. The oratory has recently been reconsecrated and holds services.

== Sources ==
- Quadraturismo website
