= Palazzo Tempi =

Coordinates: 43°45′59.92″N 11°15′18.15″E

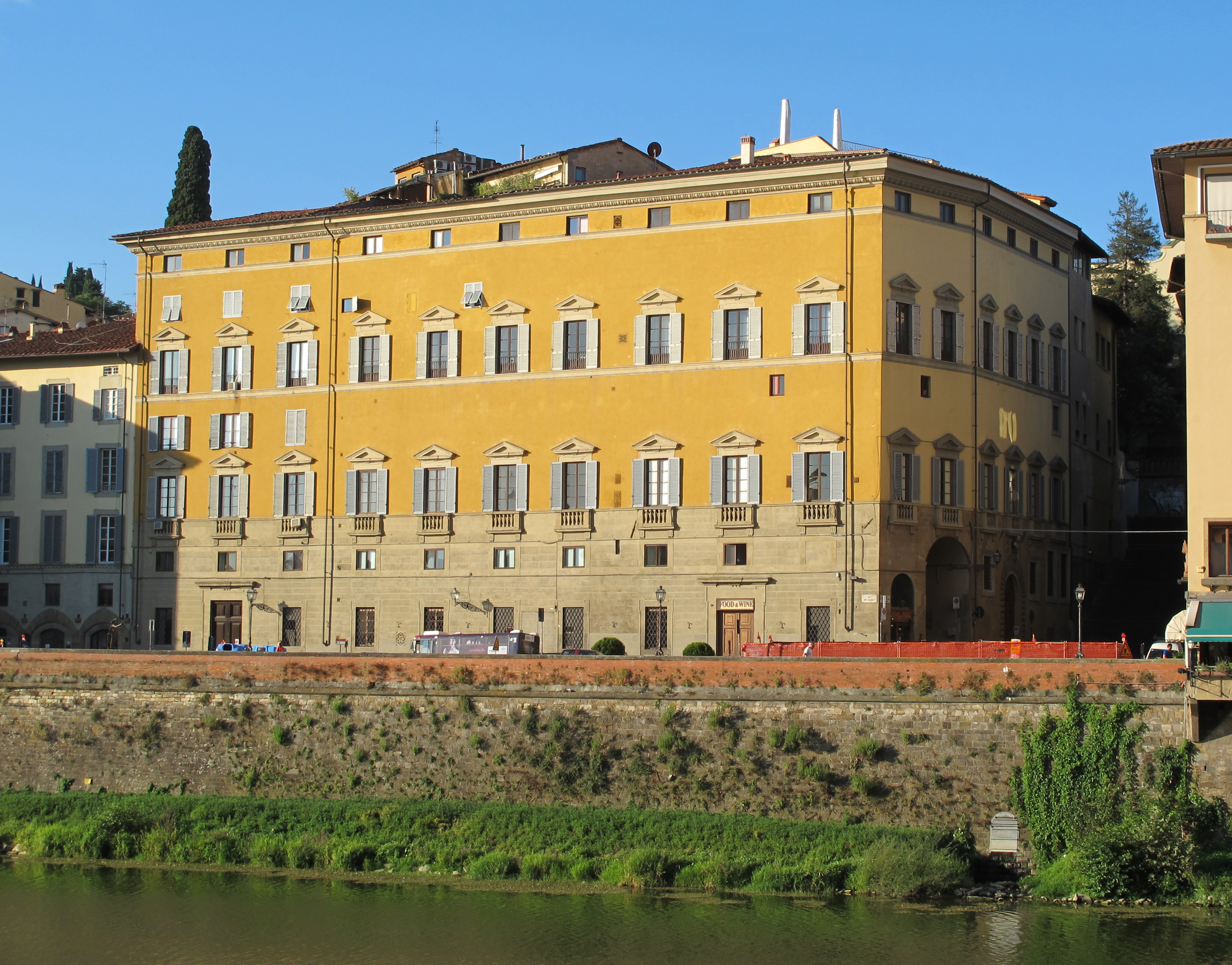
Palazzo Tempi

The Palazzo Tempi, also known as Palazzo Vettori or Bargagli Petrucci, is a palace located along the Arno river at the narrow Piazza Santa Maria Soprarno 1, corner with Via de' Bardi and Costa dei Magnoli in the Oltrarno section of Florence, Tuscany, Italy. The palace is across the river from the Galleria of the Uffizi, and a block east of the Ponte Vecchio. The Via de' Bardi originates in an arch under the building.

== History ==
The ownership of this site and palace is complex, because it changed hands many times since the construction of the palace. The area in front of the palace towards the river, now consisting of the Lungarno Torrigiani, included some houses and the razed Santa Maria dei Bardi, also called Santa Maria Sopr'Arno. This church is recalled by the Piazza on the river side.

The general area prior to the mid 14th-century, belonged to the Bardi di Vernio, but many of the buildings were destroyed or looted during the Revolt of the Ciompi in 1343. The house at the site became property of the Medici, who sold it in 1480, to gonfaloniere Bernardo del Nero. He ended up executed in 1497 by the Savonarola's Republic for plotting the return of the Medici. The next owner, Raffaello Antinori, enlarged the palace to nearly its present size. In 1553 the palace was sold to the Capponi, who sold it in 1591 to the Torrigiani, owners of the nearby Palazzo Torrigiani who quickly sold it to Belisario Vinta, a long-serving administrator for the Medici, from Cosimo I to Cosimo II. Vinta created the facades on the via de Bardi side, including a portal with the bust of Cosimo II (1609).

The design for Vinta's construction has been attributed to the architect Matteo Nigetti. In 1652, the heirs of Vinta sold the palace to Lorenzo di Raffaello de' Medici, who two years later sold it to the Tempi (1654). They utilized the architect Pietro Paolo Giovannozzi to refurbish the lungarno facade. To refurbish the interiors, he commissioned from Giovanni Camillo Sagrestani to fresco (1726) a large ceiling. This fresco was destroyed when part of the roof collapsed from the effects of the mining of the bridges set off by the retreating Germans in 1944. The Bargagli Petrucci, who inherited the property from the Tempi in 1770, used the architect Enrico Lusini, for much of the restoration of damages due to war and flooding. Among the remaining frescoes are landscapes of the Coast of Magnoli in the entry stairwell by Matteo Bonechi. Other frescoes by Bonechi decorate certain rooms of the second floor, including depictions of the Myth of Prometheus, the Judgement of Paris, the Allegory of the four Seasons, the Bath of Diana, and an Allegory of Florence. Another room is frescoed with Allegories of Vice and Virtue, by Ranieri Del Pace.

There is a legend, linked to properties in this area including the former church of Santa Maria Sopr'Arno, that resembles that of Romeo and Juliet, in that two lovers, Ippolito and Dianora, from the feuding families of Buondelmonti and Bardi respectively fall in love. The young man attempting to elope with the young woman is arrested. To protect her honor, he confesses to robbery. Yet while Ippolito is being led to execution past Dianora's house, she intercedes, the execution is cancelled, and they live happily ever after.
