= Giovanni Camillo Sagrestani =

Italian painter (1660–1731)

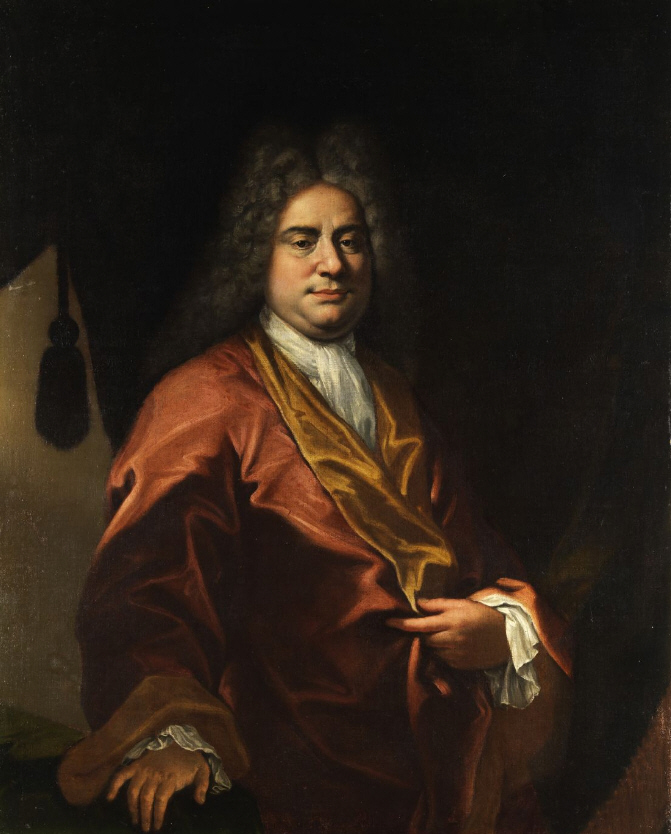
- Portrait of a gentleman in his housecoat, oil on canvas, priv. col.
- Born: 15 December 1660; Florence, Grand Duchy of Tuscany
- Died: 7 May 1731 (aged 70); Florence, Grand Duchy of Tuscany
- Education: Antonio Giusti; Carlo Cignani
- Known for: Painting
- Movement: Baroque

Giovanni Camillo Sagrestani (15 December 1660 – 7 May 1731) was an Italian painter of the Baroque era.

== Biography ==
A native of Florence, he was, according to Lanzi, a pupil of Antonio Giusti, but became a follower of the style of Carlo Cignani. His refined and elegant works, painted with a flickering touch in patches of cold, transparent colour, made him a highly fashionable fresco painter. From 1704 he is documented as participating (with the aid of assistants) in the decoration of the Palazzo Capponi in Florence.

Later, again in Florence, he frescoed rooms in the Palazzo Corsini Suarez, the oval ceiling showing the Apotheosis of the Tempi Family of the salone in the Palazzo Tempi (now Bargagli-Petrucci), for which a bozzetto survives (Venice, priv. col.), and overdoors and, with the help of his pupil Ranieri Del Pace, a ceiling at the Villa di Poggio alla Scaglia. In 1710, working with Del Pace and with the quadratura specialist Rinaldo Botti, he painted St. Thomas Aquinas in Glory on the vault of the Oratory of St Thomas Aquinas, Florence.

In 1713 he executed the altarpiece the Marriage of the Virgin in Santo Spirito, Florence, a painting that in its brilliant colour and harmonious composition reveals a debt to his friend Sebastiano Ricci. By this time Sagrestani was highly esteemed and in great demand with Florentine churchmen and patricians. In 1714–15 he painted the canvas of St. Philip Neri in Glory for the ceiling of San Firenze, Florence, for which there are several bozzetti (Florence, Complex of San Firenze; Palazzo Davia Bargellini, Bologna).

This commission was followed c. 1716 by works for Castelfiorentino: the fresco of the Death of St. Verdiana in the cupola of the fourth chapel of San Verdiana and a series of oval canvases featuring scenes from the Life of St. Verdiana (Castelfiorentino, Confraternita della Misericordia). Among the highest artistic achievements of Sagrestani’s mature years are three works in Florence, the Virgin and St. Bernard of Clairvaux (1721) in San Frediano in Cestello, the Martyrdom of St. Andrew (1722) in the church of the Mantellate and the Crucifixion (1727) in San Firenze.

Also in the 1720s Sagrestani worked for the Arazzeria Medicea, designing tapestries for the Medici. In addition he produced numerous cabinet paintings, among the most important of which are the exotic Turkish Harem scenes (Genoa, priv. col.; Florence, Depositi Gal.). Preparatory drawings for these (ex-A. Neerman priv. col., London) suggest the influence of François Rivière (1675–1746). Sagrestani died in Florence on 7 May 1731. His major pupils were Matteo Bonechi, Ranieri Del Pace, and Giuseppe Moriani.

== Gallery ==
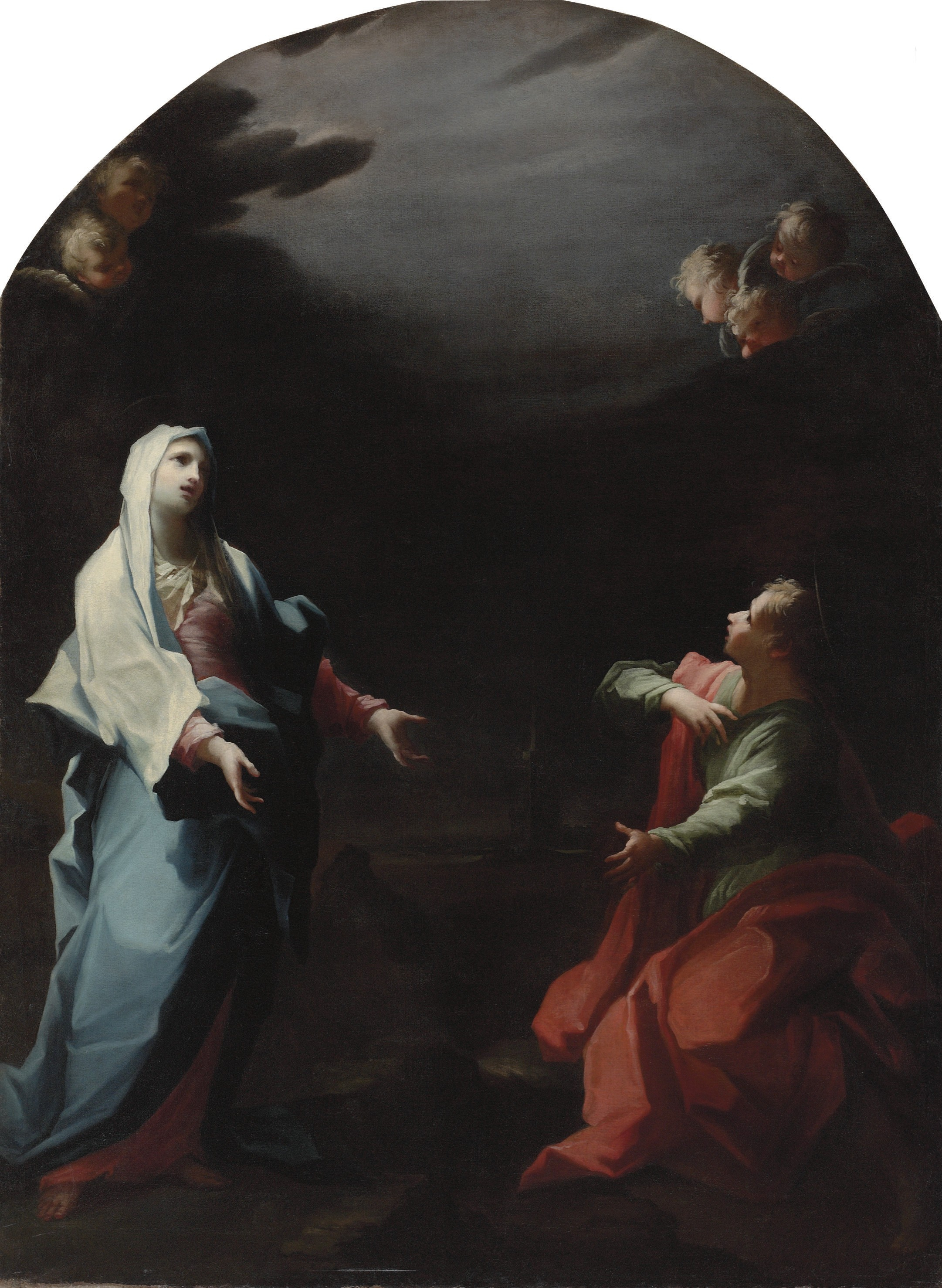
Madonna and Saint John the Evangelist, priv. col.

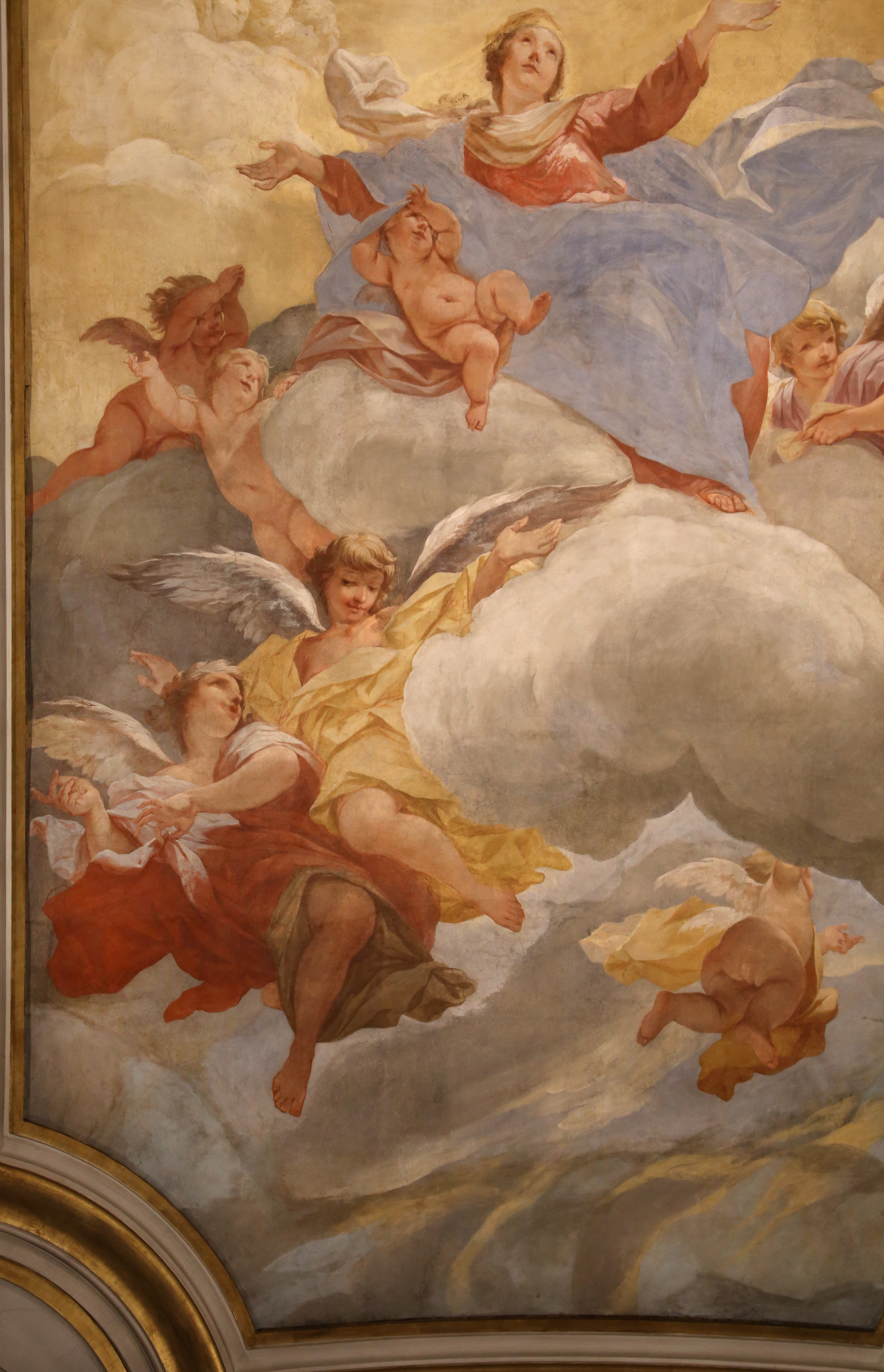
Madonna in Glory, Santa Maria dei Ricci, Florence

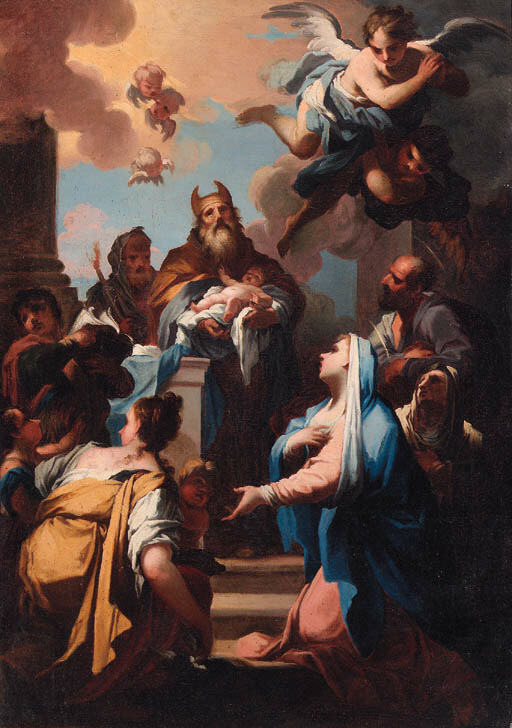
Presentation of Jesus, priv. col.

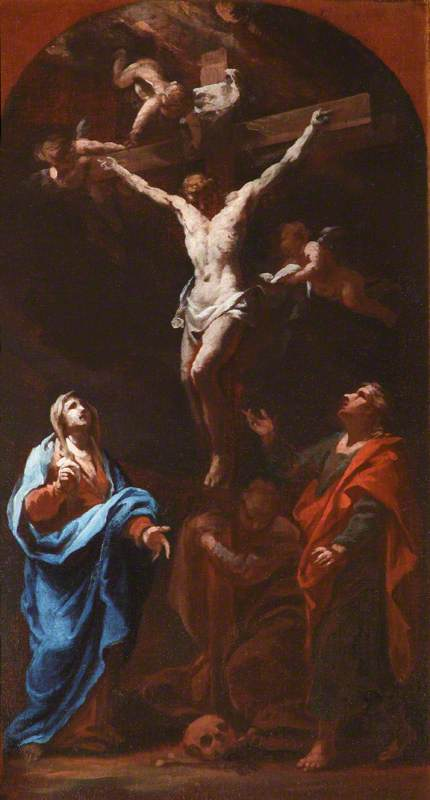
Allegory of Sincerity

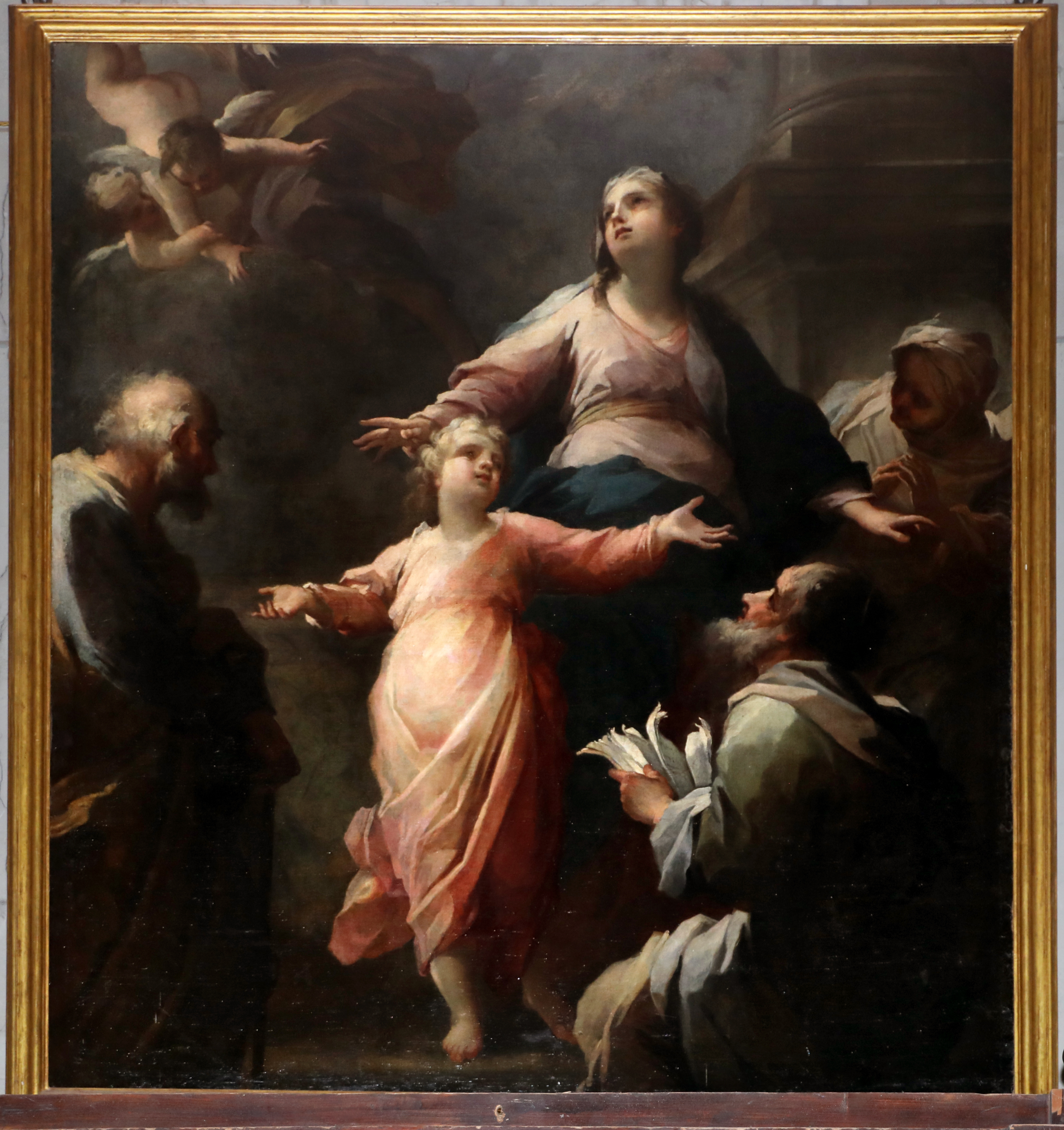
Presentation of Mary, San Giusto, Ema

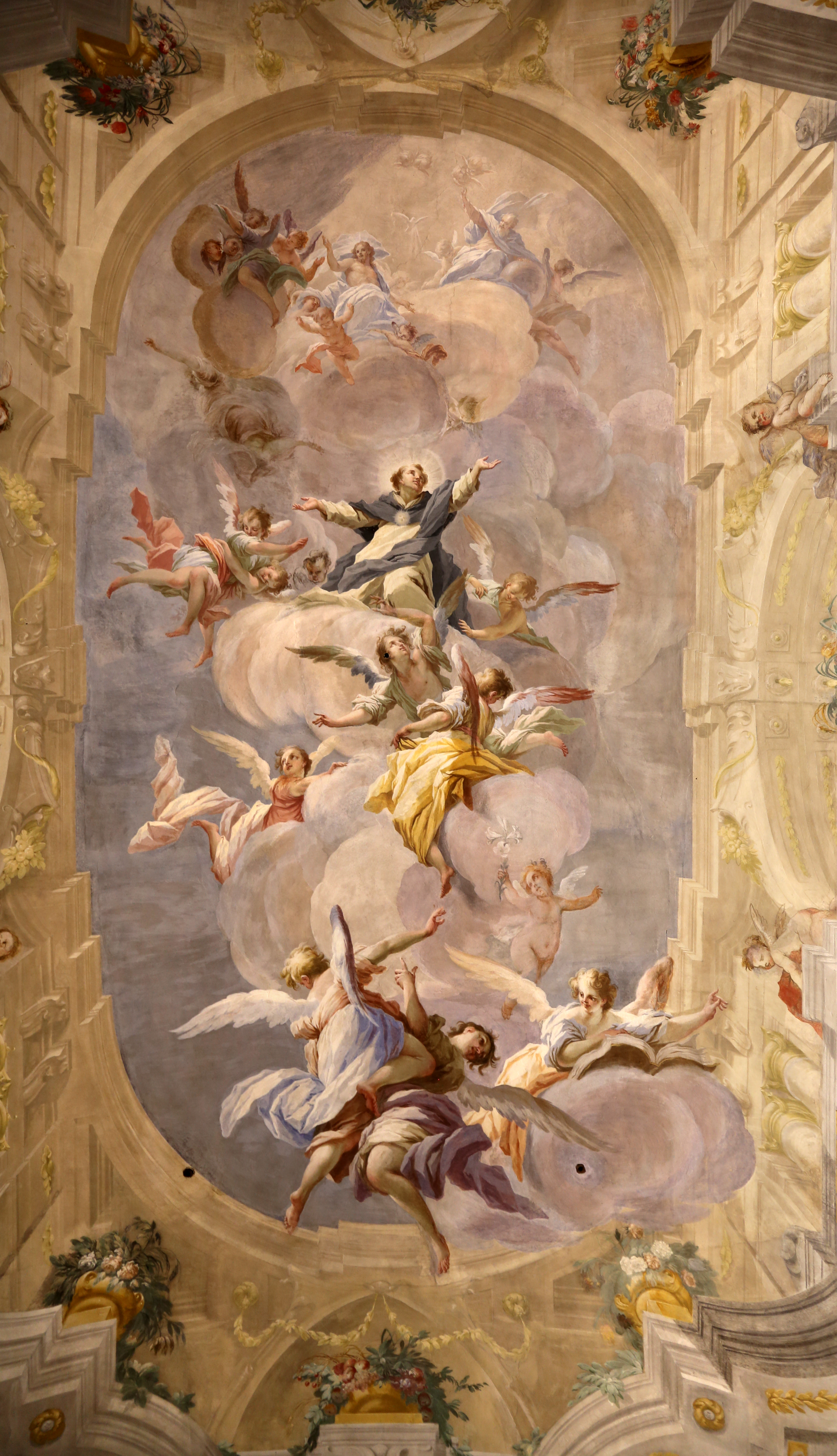
St. Thomas Aquinas in Glory (Detail), Oratory of St Thomas Aquinas, Florence

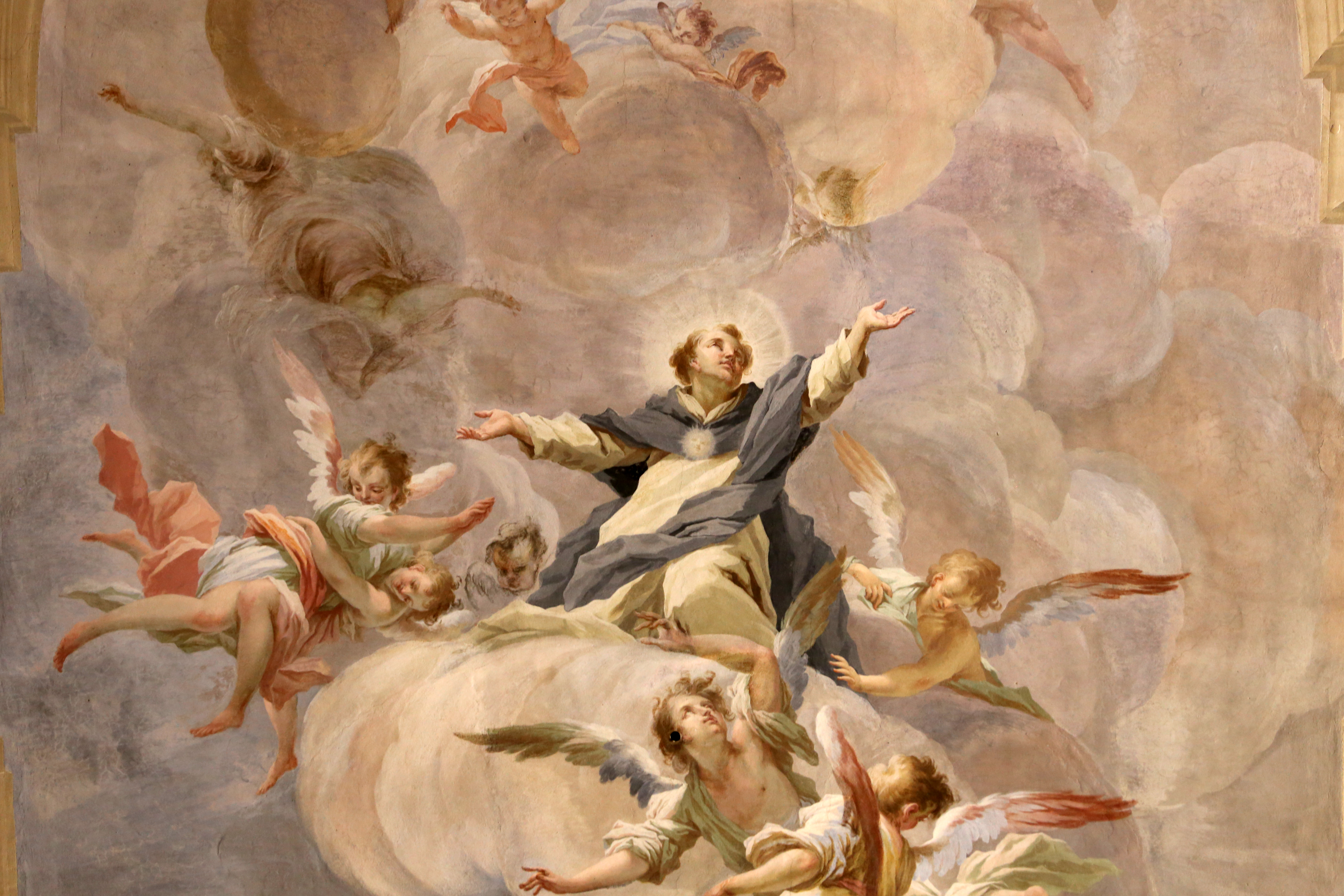
St. Thomas Aquinas in Glory (Detail), Oratory of St Thomas Aquinas, Florence

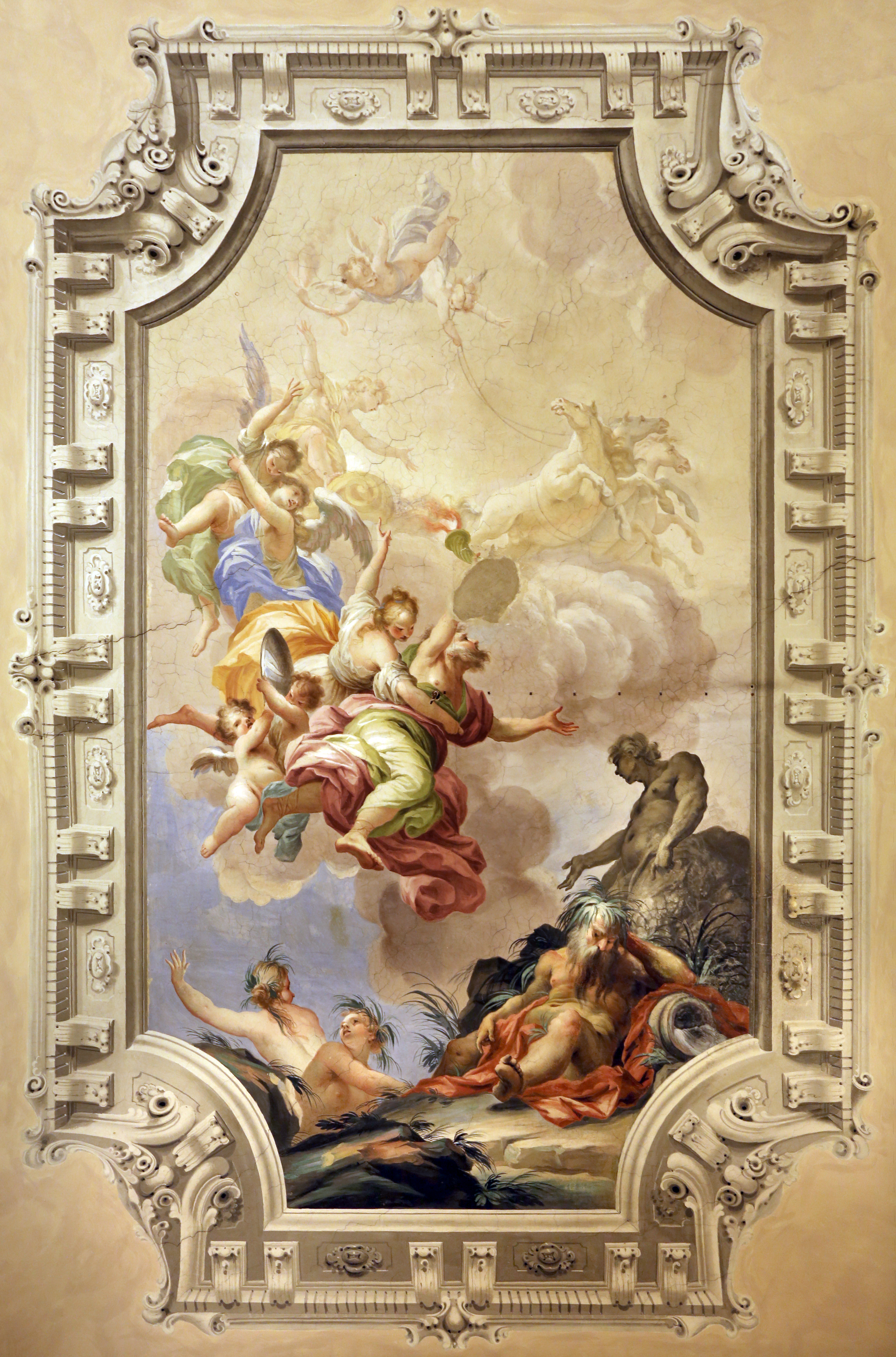
Allegory of Fire, Palazzo Tempi, Florence
