= Ferdinando Ruggieri =

Italian architect

Francesco Saverio Fabri
- Born: 1691; Florence, Grand Duchy of Tuscany
- Died: 27 June 1741 (aged 49–50); Florence, Grand Duchy of Tuscany
- Known for: Architecture; Engraving
- Movement: Baroque and Neoclassicism

Ferdinando Ruggeri (1691 – 27 June 1741) was an Italian architect and engraver, active in Florence during the late Baroque period. Ruggieri helped design the left facade of the Church of San Firenze (1715), the Palazzo Capponi in Florence, the Palazzo Sansedoni (1736) in Siena, and the collegiata (1738) of Empoli. He also published books of architecture.

== Biography ==
=== Early career ===
Ferdinando Ruggieri was born in Florence in 1691. He was an assistant to Carlo Fontana, for whom he prepared drawings for the Palazzo Capponi (completed c. 1710), Florence. His first major commission was the remodelling of the façade (from c. 1715) of the oratory church of San Filippo Neri (or Chiesa Nuova), Florence, which forms part of the group of buildings known as Complex of San Firenze, owned by the Oratorians. The church had been begun in 1668 by Pier Francesco Silvani and Ruggieri’s façade has a strong Baroque form, with flanking pairs of Corinthian columns and a prominent segmental pediment. The uppermost parapet, featuring reversed halves of segmental pediments, is rich and complex, as is the entrance portal. The central element of the three-part façade, fronting the monastery, was designed later by Zanobi del Rosso (1724–98), who also duplicated Ruggieri’s church façade at the eastern end (1772–5) to provide a symmetrical composition.

=== Mature work ===
In 1732 Ruggieri submitted an unsuccessful competition scheme for the façade of the Archbasilica of Saint John Lateran, Rome, and in 1736–9 he remodelled the church of Santa Felicita, Florence, for the House of Medici. The church was rebuilt with an aisleless nave of almost Neoclassical restraint, and with a tribune for the Medici family. In the same period he rebuilt the Palazzo Sansedoni (c. 1736), Siena, and the Collegiata Church (1736–8) at Empoli. In 1740 he worked on the second Palazzo Capponi in Via Cavour, Florence, and in the same year he rebuilt the campanile of San Lorenzo, Florence. A grandiose proposal for the Palazzo Niccolini was not executed. Chiefly Baroque in style, Ruggieri’s buildings owe much of their clarity of form to his mentor, Fontana.

=== Engravings ===
Ruggieri was equally active as an engraver, publishing several collections including his major work, Studio d’architettura civile (1722–8), which contains 237 copperplate illustrations. His best-known work was his plan of the city of Florence, dated 1st September 1731, an engraving that was reprinted and modernized on many later occasions. The detailed plan was drawn from his own sketches, and it was the first to depict accurately such details as the chief palaces, gardens and orchards. It was dedicated to the last Medicean grand duke of Tuscany, Gian Gastone de' Medici.

== Writings ==
- Studio d’architettura civile sopra gli ornamenti di porte ecc. dalle fabbriche più insigni di Firenze, 3 vols (Florence, 1722–8).

== Gallery ==
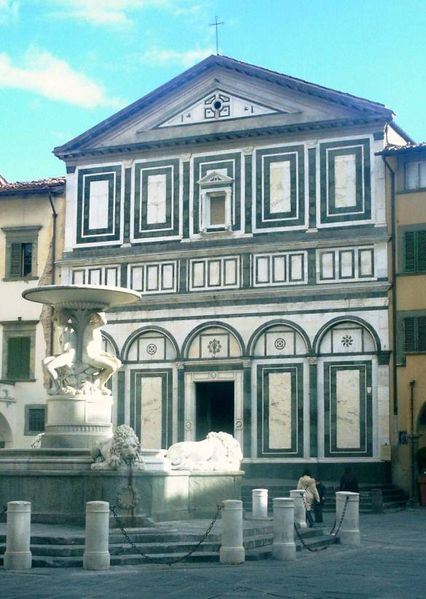
Collegiata Church at Empoli

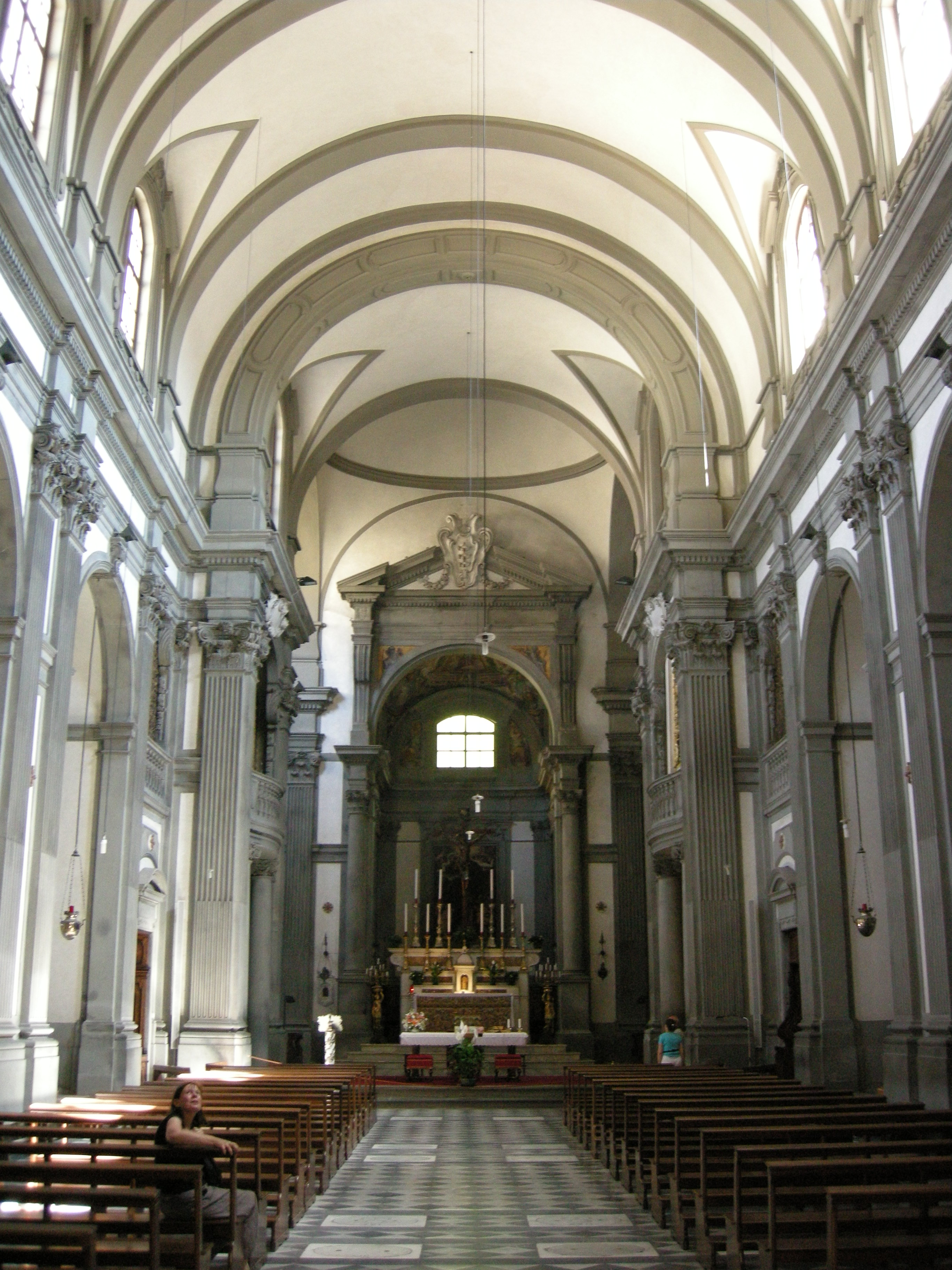
Interior of Santa Felicita, Noto

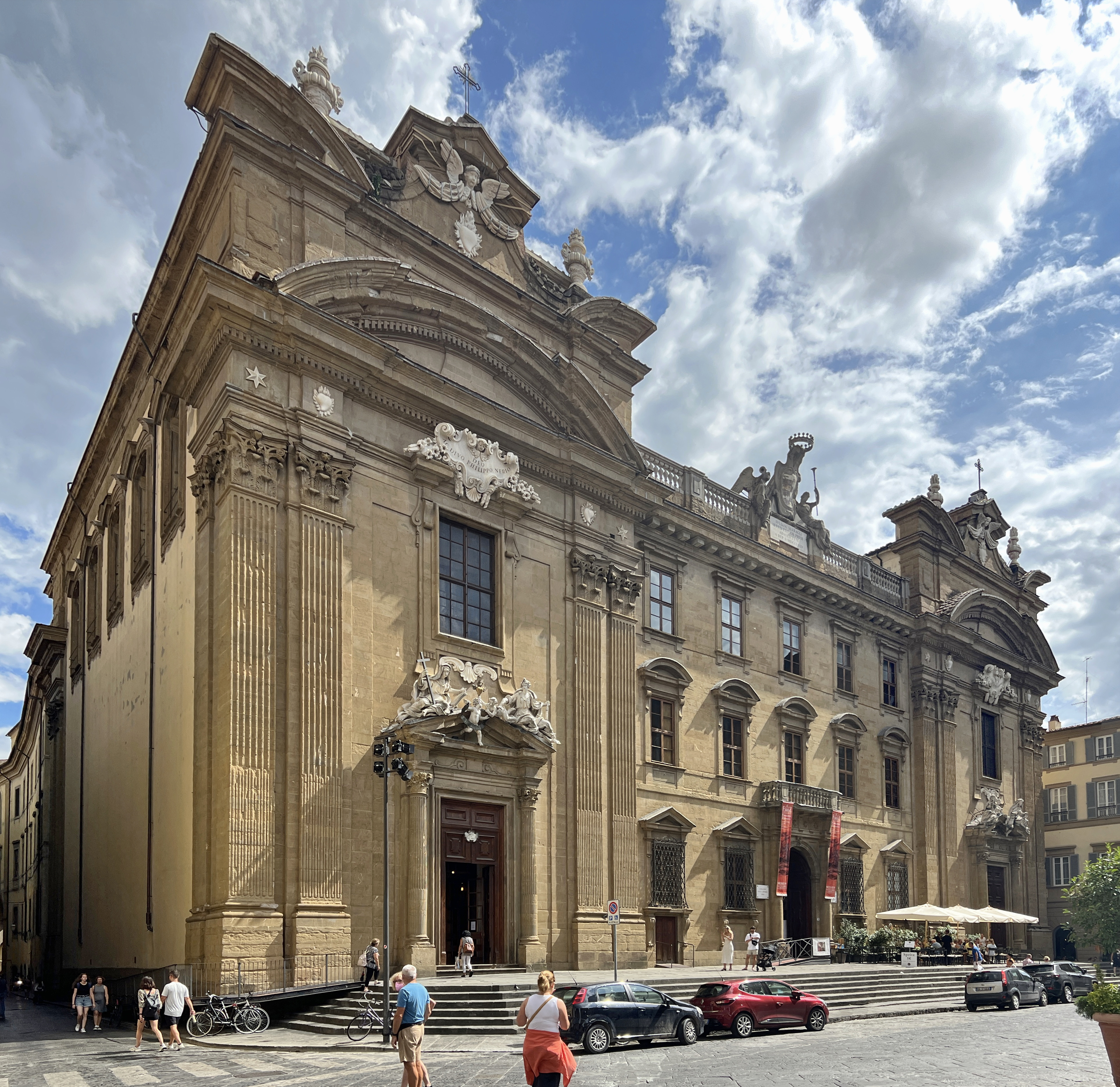
Façade of the Complex of San Firenze, Florence

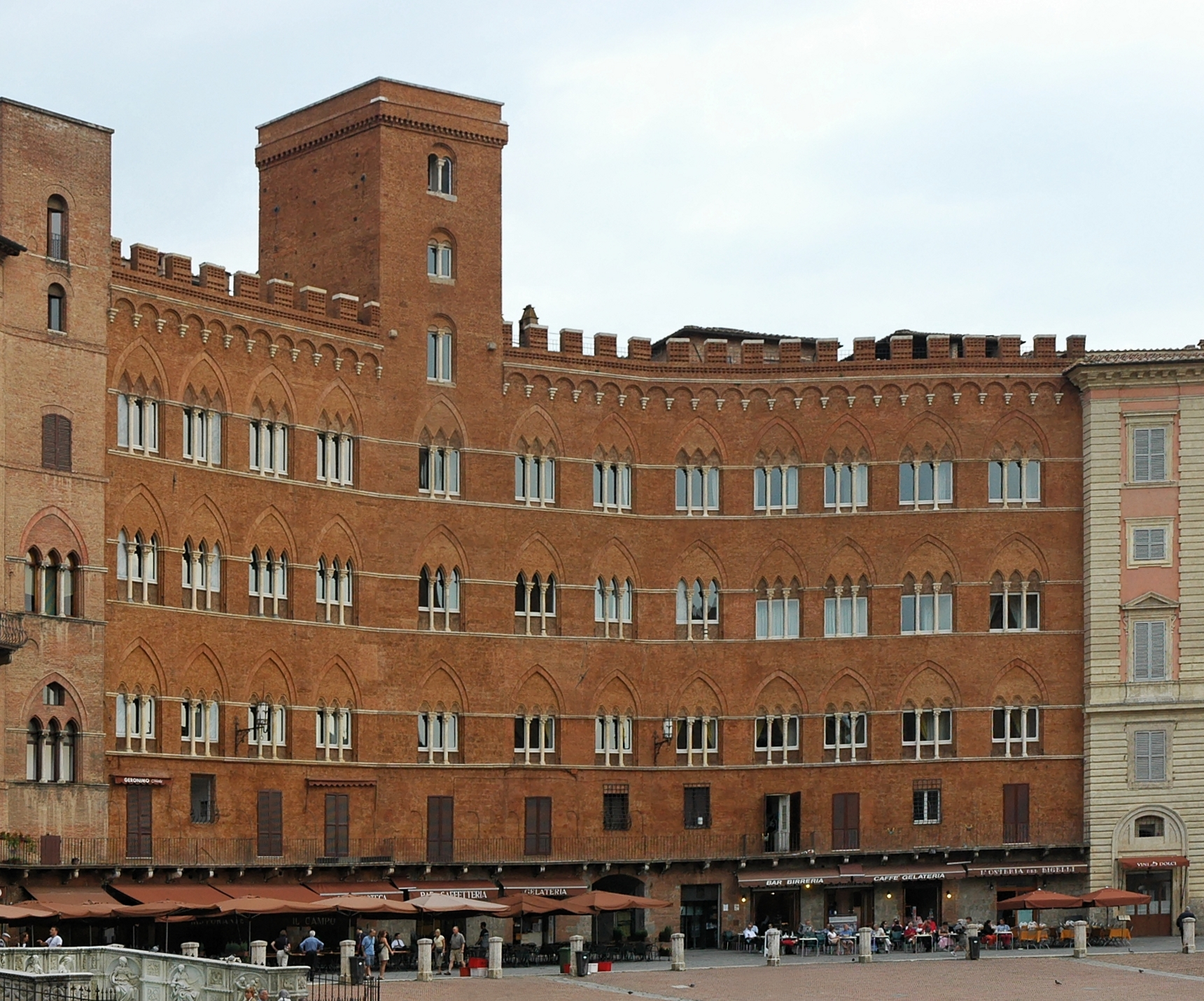
Palazzo Sansedoni, Siena

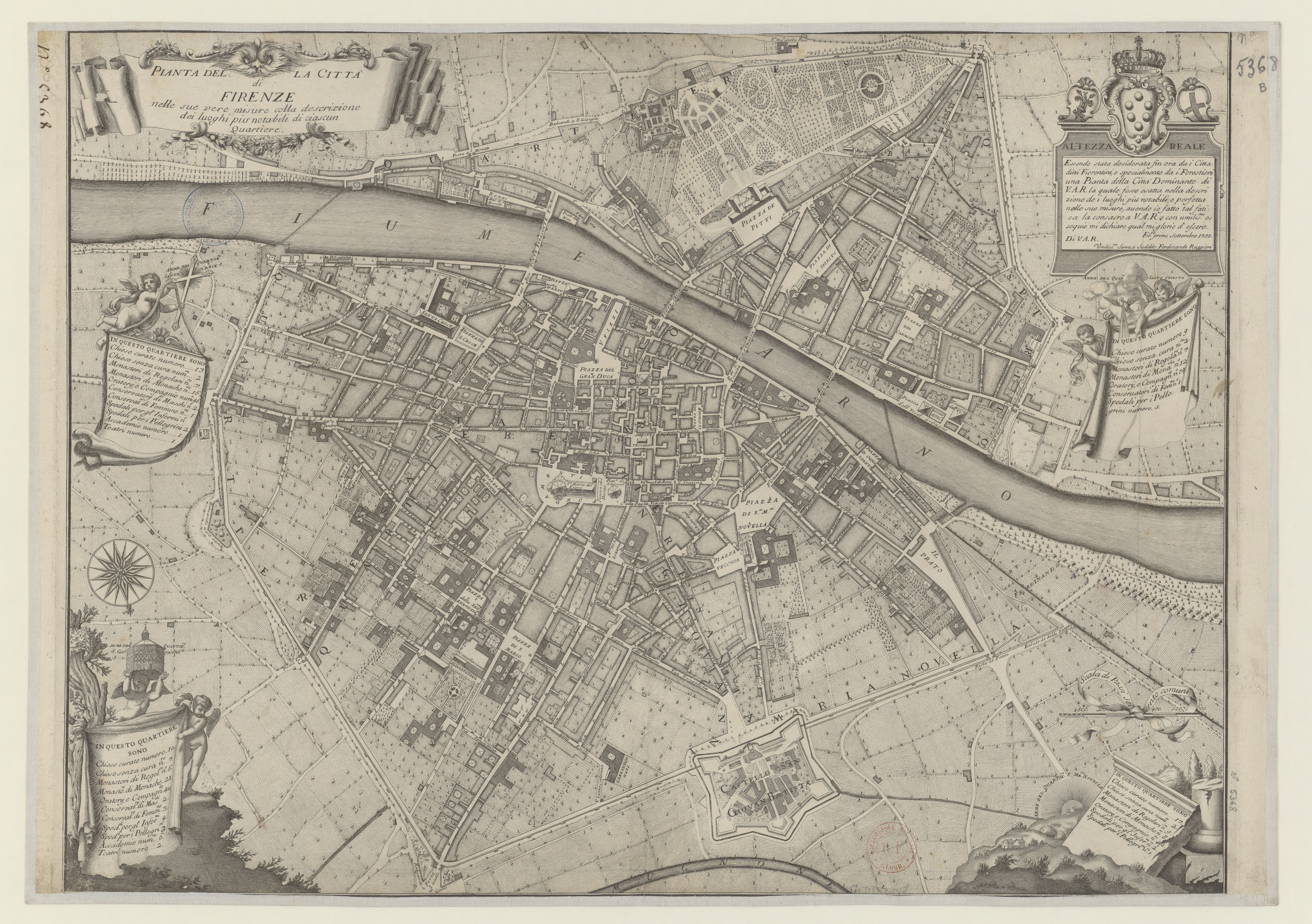
Pianta della Città di Firenze, 1731

== Bibliography ==
- Boffitto, G.; Mori, A. (1926). Piante e vedute di Firenze. Florence: Tip. Giuntina.
- Fanelli, G. (1973). Firenze: Architettura e città. Vol. 2 vols. Florence: Vallecchi.
- M. Mosco, ed. (1974). Itinerario di Firenze barocca. Florence: Centro Di.
- Bencini, R.; Busignani, A. (1974–79). Le chiese di Firenze. 4 vols. Florence: Sansoni.
- Varriano, J. (1986). Italian Baroque and Rococo Architecture. New York and Oxford: Oxford University Press. ISBN 978-0195035483.
