= Palazzo Sansedoni =

Coordinates: 43.319041°N 11.331759°E

Palazzo Sansedoni is a Gothic style urban palace and tower, whose concave facade is situated facing the Palazzo Pubblico across the Piazza del Campo in the political center of the city of Siena, region of Tuscany, Italy.

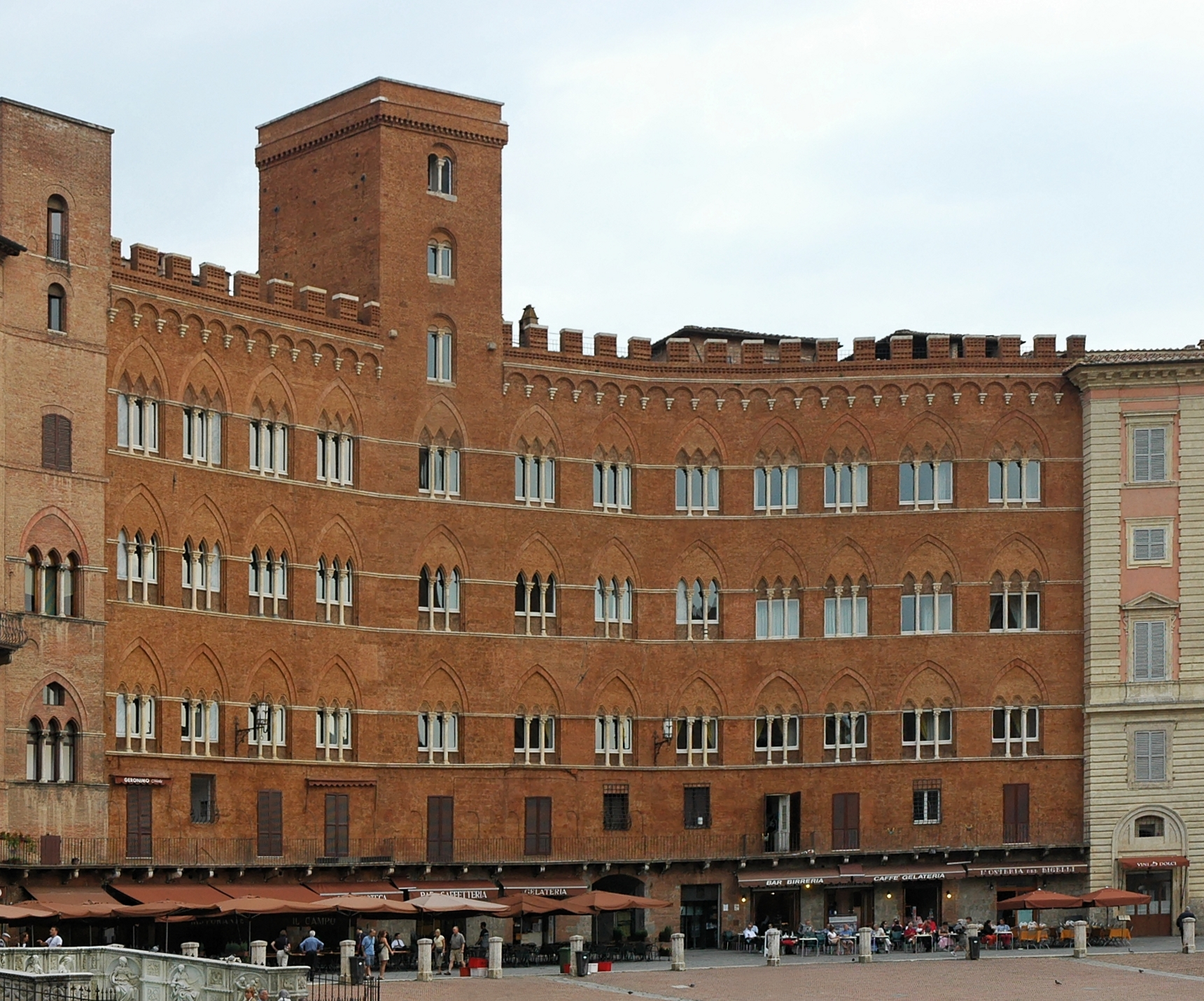
Palazzo Sansedoni view from Piazza del Campo

== History ==
The palace was erected after the mid-13th century fusing nearly five private homes, and closing one of the access points to the Piazza. The contract and design for the building from 1340 still survives, which names the master masons Agostino di Giovanni, Agostino di Rosso and Cecco di Casino as responsible. Completion of the palace took nearly a century. In 1466, the owner, Tofo di Cecco Sansedoni, was requested to complete the Piazza facade, and fill in many of the window arches. The street side was satisfactorily completed. Some sources report the tower was truncated in order to not have it taller than the Torre del Mangia. The ground floor would have had many shops lining the street and campo.

The palace underwent numerous alterations, and the palace as we see it in 2014 is due to a refurbishment in pure original gothic style by the architect Ferdinando Ruggieri. The trifore mullioned windows now appear to be partially blocked by a lower brick wall. The interior has decorations (1645–1760) completed by Gian Domenico Ferretti and Anton Domenico Gabbiani. Gabbiani painted a Glory of the Blessed Ambrogio Sansedoni for the private chapel.

In 2015, the palace has offices and exhibition spaces for the Fondazione Fondazione Monte dei Paschi di Siena.

== Bibliography ==
- Toscana. Guida d'Italia (Guida rossa), Touring Club Italiano, Milano 2003, p. 536.
