= Rinaldo Botti =

Italian painter (1658–1740)

Rinaldo Botti (1658 in Florence – 31 March 1740 in Florence) was a painter active in the Baroque period from the Grand Duchy of Tuscany. He was a pupil of Jacopo Chiavistelli, and specialised in quadratura. He collaborated with Andrea Landini in frescoing some salons of Villas belonging to the Corsini family. He painted the ceiling of Santa Elisabetta delle Convertite.

In other projects, he collaborated with Alessandro Gherardini, Filippo Maria Galleti, Giovanni Andrea Brunori, and Giovanni Sacconi.

In the palace of Francesco Maria Niccolò Gabburri on via Ghibellina, he worked with Lorenzo del Moro in decorating some murals (1708). With the same artist, he worked (1702) in the piano nobile of the Palazzo Incontri. With Andrea Landini in 1700, he helped paint the wall decorations of the Villa Feroni. Stucco decoration was added by Giovanni Battista Ciceri.

He also worked in Pescia, for example, in the Oratory della Misericordia (1702), the nave of Santa Maria Maddalena, the Oratory of San Biagio, the church of Santa Maria Nuova, the Casa Galeffi, and the theatre of the Accademici Cheti.

He performed some decoration with a team including Giuseppe Tonelli, Lorenzo Del Moro, Stefano Papi, and Landini in 1703 for the Cardinal Francesco de Medici, in decorating the Villa di Lappeggi. With Del Moro in 1705, he decorated the quadratura for the church of San Domenico in Fiesole.
