= Antonio Giusti =

Italian painter (1624–1705)

Antonio Giusti (1624–1705) was an Italian painter of the Baroque period, active mainly in Florence. He was a pupil of the painters Cesare Dandini and Mario Balassi. Giusti was known for his landscape paintings, in the style of Salvatore Rosa. Among those who studied with Giusti was Giovanni Camillo Sagrestani.
