= Pala delle Convertite =

Painting by Sandro Botticelli

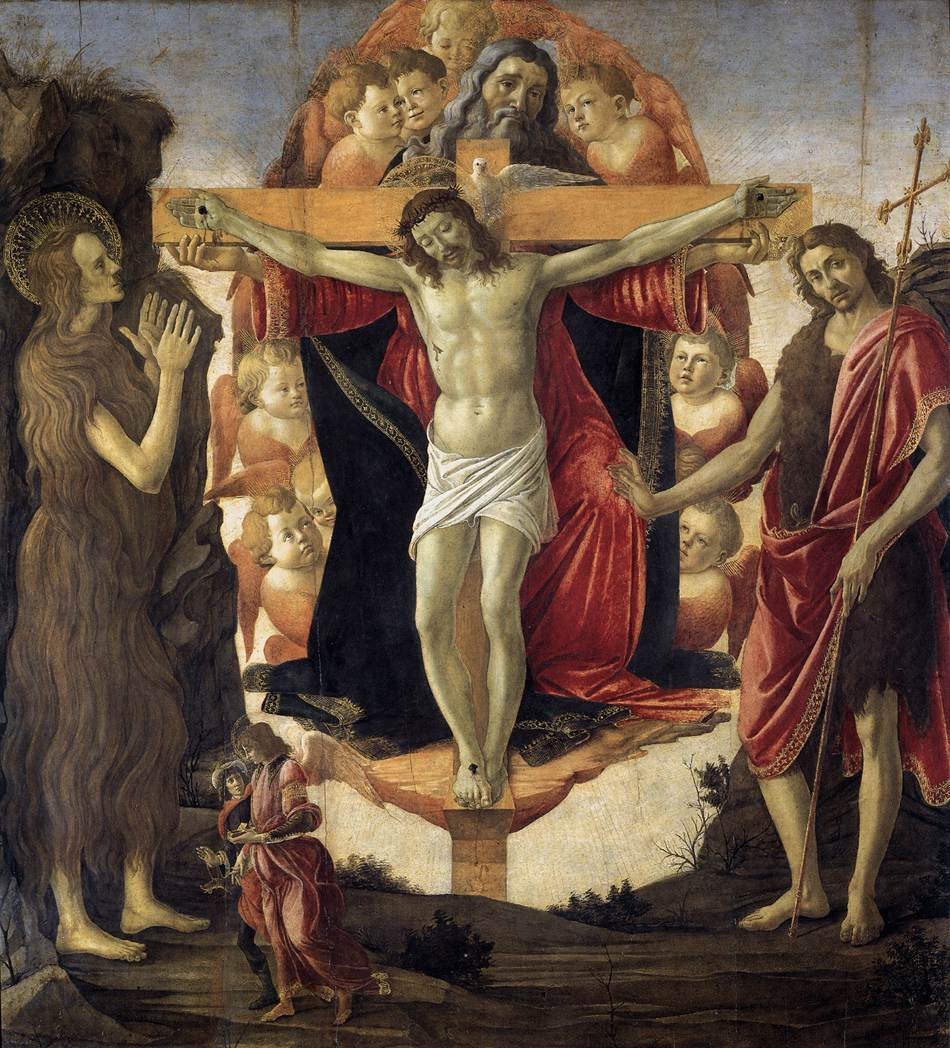
- before 2021 restoration
- Artist: Sandro Botticelli
- Year: 1491–1493
- Medium: Tempera on panel
- Dimensions: 215 cm × 192 cm (85 in × 76 in)
- Location: Courtauld Gallery, London

The Pala delle Convertite or The Trinity with Saints Mary Magdalen and John the Baptist, (the museum's name) or Holy Trinity, is an altarpiece by the Italian Renaissance painter Sandro Botticelli and his workshop, traditionally dated to c. 1491–1493. It is now in the Courtauld Gallery in London. It is now thought the painting was begun much earlier, perhaps in the 1470s, and was worked on during three decades.

It was commissioned by the Arte dei Medici e degli Speziali (guild of the Doctors and Pharmacists, to which the painters also belonged) for the church of Santa Elisabetta delle Convertite in Florence, a church institution housing former prostitutes or fallen women, who had converted from their previous life, and whose patroness saint was Mary Magdalene The traditional Italian name means the altarpiece or "panel" (pala) of the "converted ones" (convertite).

A restoration of the painting was completed in 2021.

== Main scene ==
The painting is in tempera on poplar panel. The main scene shows the Holy Trinity (Jesus crucified, God and a dove representing Holy Spirit) within an mandorla (almond-shaped frame) with seraphim. In the background is a blue sky within two rocky spurs, in front of which are Mary Magdalene, taken in an intense praying posture, and St. John the Baptist, patron saint of Florence, who, as usual in the pictures of the period, is pointing to the centre of the composition.

The figure of Magdalene resembles the rather earlier "Magdalene Penitent" by Donatello, now usually dated to about 1440, and that by Desiderio da Settignano (c. 1455) in the church of Santa Trinita.

There are stylistic disparities between the style of the two standing saints, suggesting they were painted at different times.

== Tobias and the Angel ==
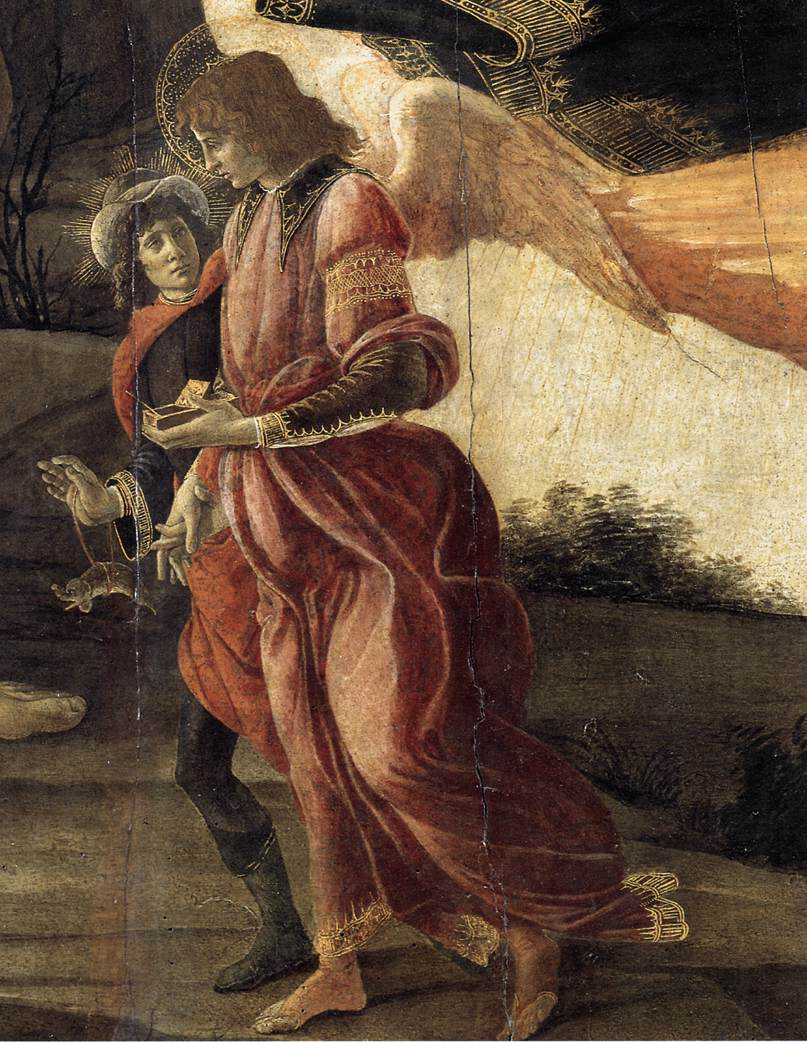
Detail with Tobias and the Angel, 1490s

In the lower part, at a much smaller scale, are Tobias and the Angel (the Archangel Raphael with Tobias), who is holding the fish that, in the Biblical tale, he had been told by the angel to capture in order to save his father (but his usual dog is missing). They walk past, ignoring the main scene above them; there are a number of paintings where the pair intrude on other religious scenes. Their presence is no doubt because Raphael was the patron saint of the Arte dei Medici e degli Speziali.

Modern imaging has revealed that originally this pair were on the right behind the cross in a landscape background that was later overpainted. They are painted in a somewhat different (indeed better) style than the large figures above; the heads of the seraphim in particular are considered to be painted by the workshop.

It is now thought that the first figures of Tobias and the Angel were painted by Filippino Lippi, Botticelli's main assistant in the earlier period, while the relocated pair we see now are probably by Botticelli himself, in the 1490s.

== See also ==
- List of works by Sandro Botticelli
