= Lorenzo del Moro =

Italian painter (1677–1735)

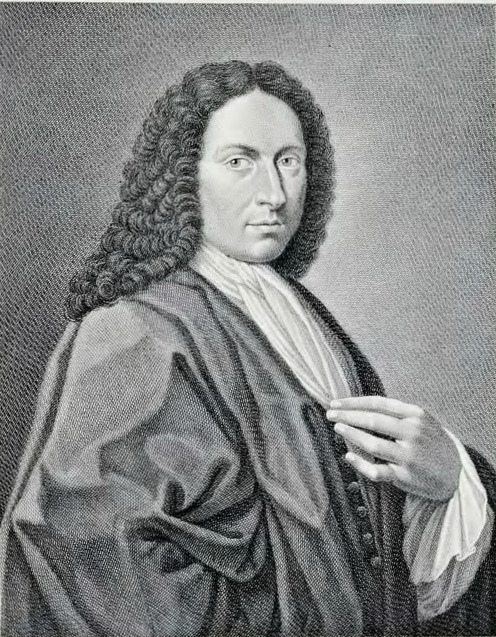
- Born: 16 December 1677; Florence
- Died: 16 July 1735 (aged 57); Florence
- Occupation: Painter
- Children: Giuseppe del Moro

Lorenzo del Moro (1677-1735) was an Italian painter of the Rococo period, active mainly in his native Florence, and painting mainly quadratura.

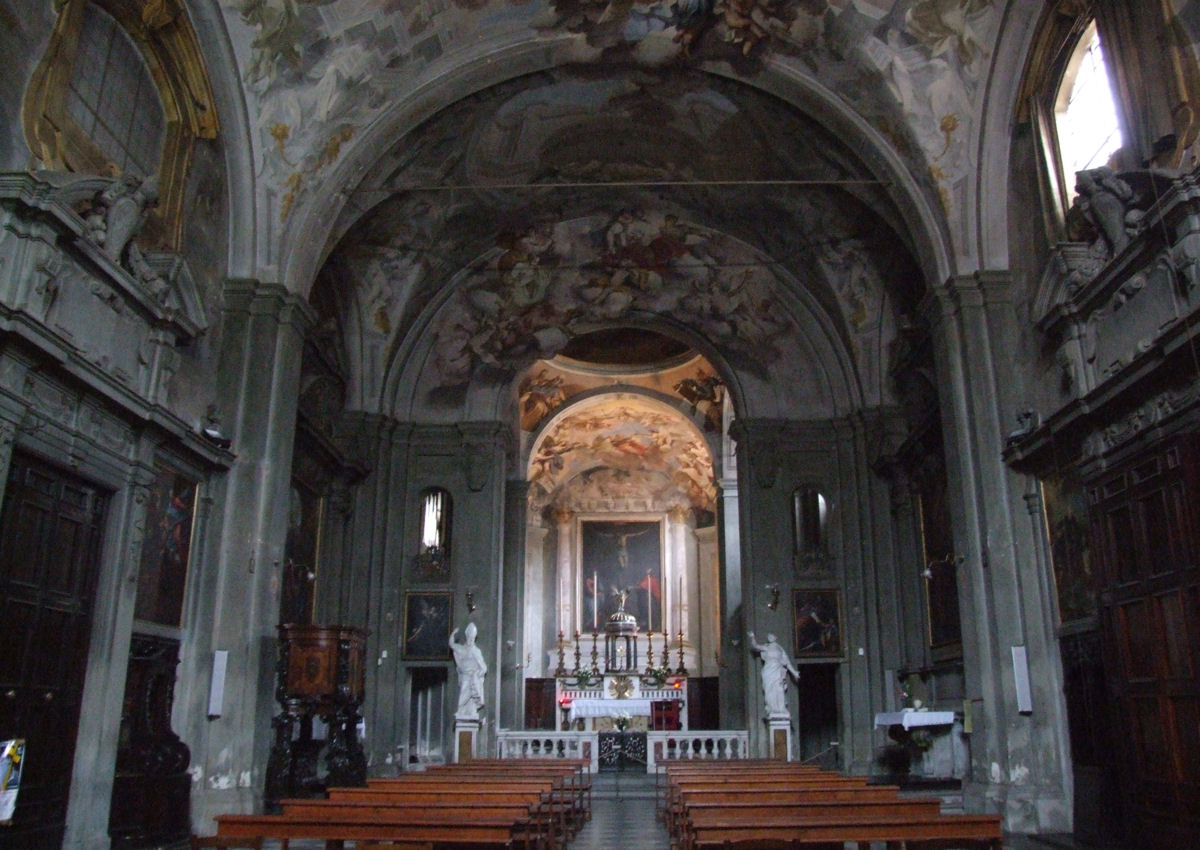
Ceiling fresco of San Filippo e Prospero in Pistoia

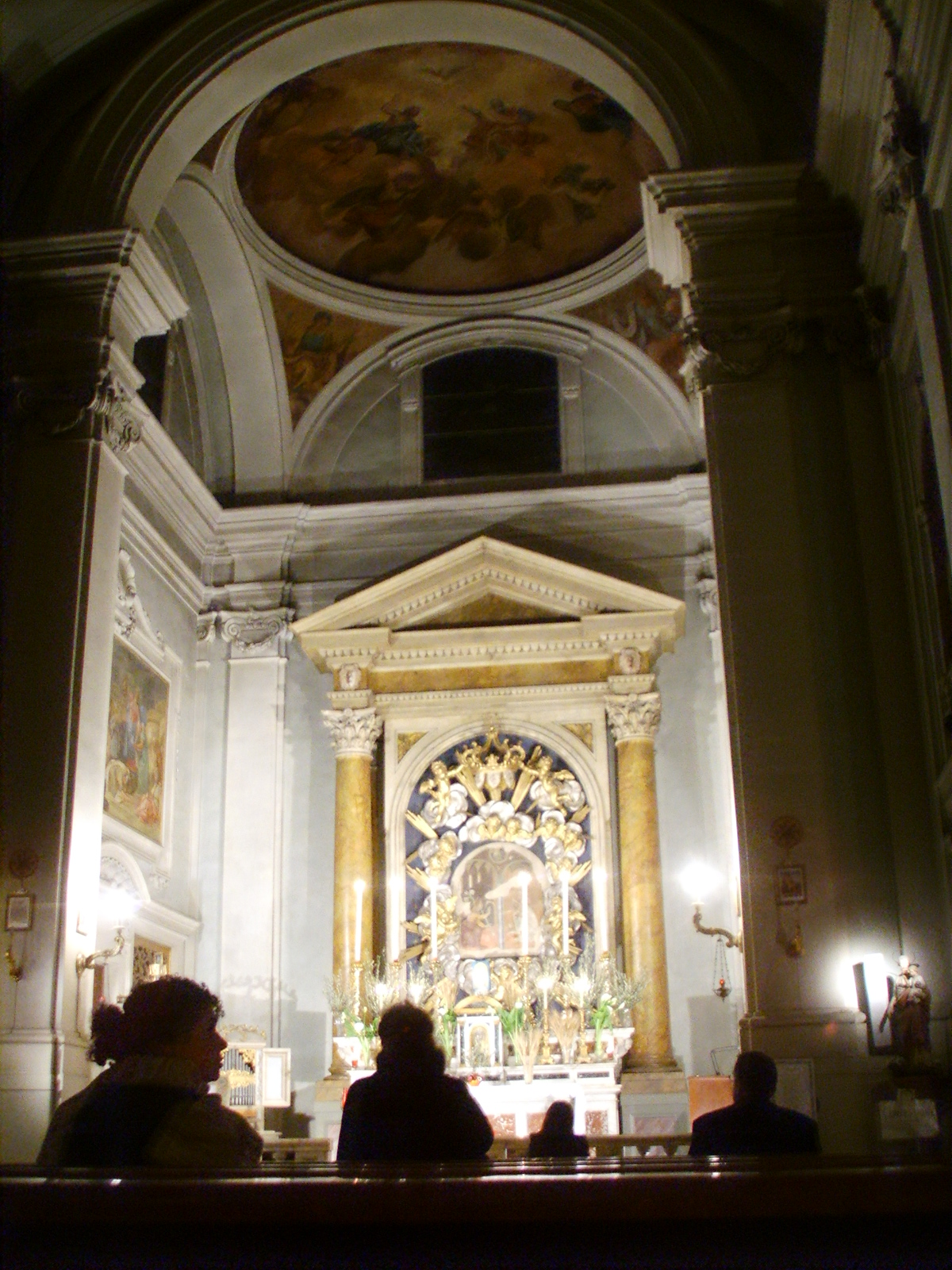
Assumption of the Virgin at Church of Santa Maria de' Ricci

He trained and later often worked with his cousin, Rinaldo Botti. He worked in the Church of San Domenico in Fiesole with Matteo Bonechi. He helped decorate the Sanctuary of Santa Verdiana in Castelfiorentino with the collaboration of Alessandro Gherardini. With Tommaso Redi, he helped decorate the Palazzo Altoviti and the Church of Santa Margherita de' Ricci. He also worked on the Monastery of Santa Maria Rosano. He worked in Pescia and Pistoia. After 1716, he embarked in a series of collaborations with Pietro Anderlini.

== Sources ==
- Quadraturismo Site
