= Santa Elisabetta delle Convertite =

Church building in Florence, Italy

Coordinates: 43°45′55.61″N 11°14′39.51″E

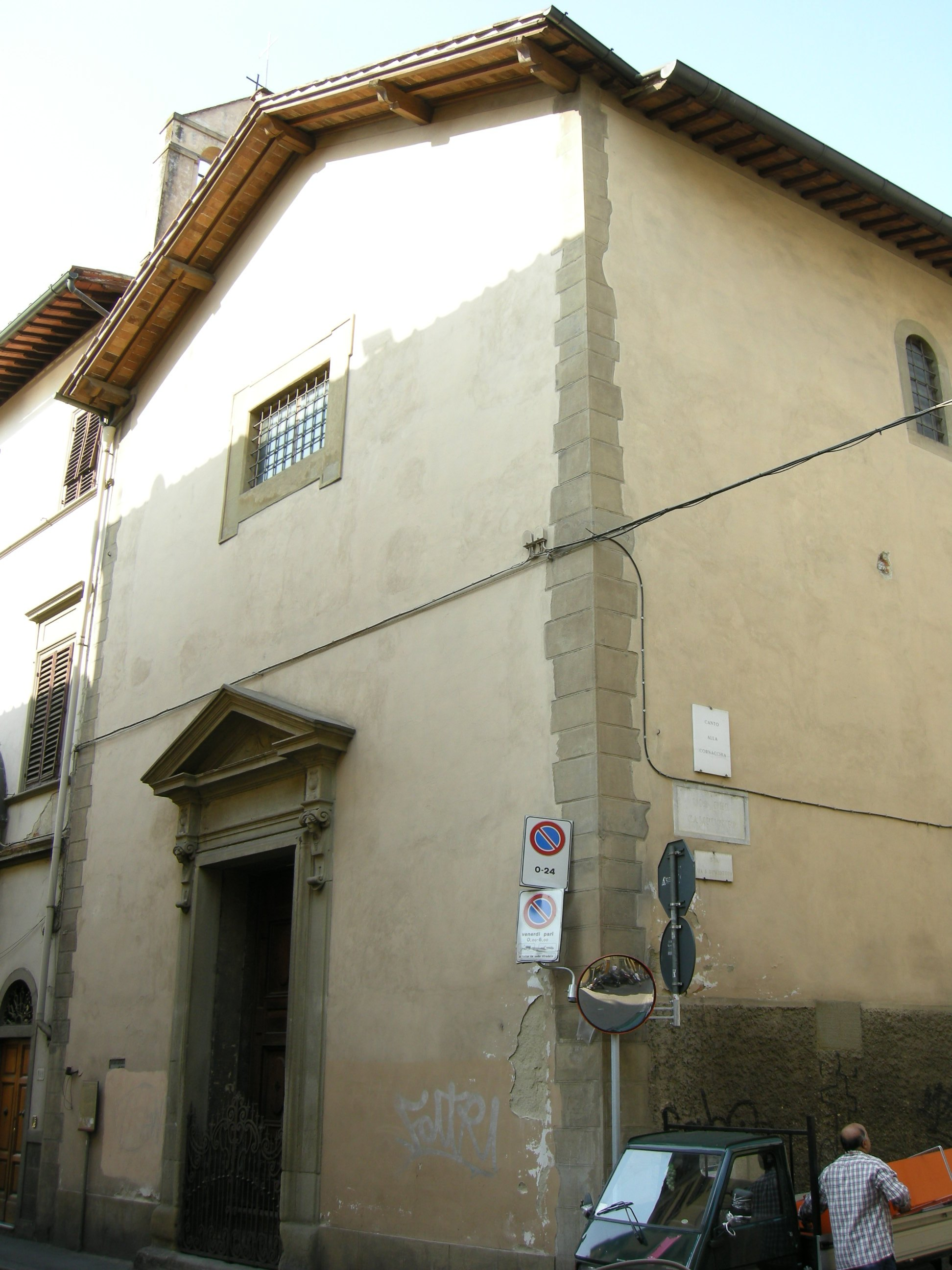

Religion
- Affiliation: Georgian Orthodox
- Province: Florence

Location
- Location: Florence, Italy
- Interactive map of Santa Elisabetta delle Convertite

Architecture
- Type: Church
- Style: Romanesque and Baroque
- Groundbreaking: 1330

Santa Elisabetta delle Convertite is a formerly Roman Catholic church on Via de' Serragli in the Oltrarno neighborhood of Florence region of Tuscany, Italy. Since 2015, the church has functioned as a Georgian Orthodox church. The former adjacent convent has multiple uses, including in 2016 as the Istituti Pio X Artigianelli.

== History ==
In 1332, a confraternity attached to the church of Santo Spirito founded an Augustinian monastery for repentant prostitutes at the site of an existing chapel dedicated to St Elizabeth of Hungary. It became one of the largest (in terms of population) but poorest communities of nuns in Florence. In 1624, the building incorporated the birth house of Saint Phillip Neri (born 1515). In 1808 the monastery was suppressed. It has had a number of subsequent uses since. The chapel is currently used by the Georgian Orthodox Church.

The church has a ceiling fresco depicting the Glory of St Maria Maddalena de' Pazzi by Alessandro Gherardini. While many of the church's famous works are now dispersed, such as Sandro Botticelli's Pala delle Convertite, it still contains Adoration of the Shepherds by Michele di Ridolfo del Ghirlandaio. The structure was restored by Giuseppe Castellucci in the 1900s, and again in the mid-1990s.

== Works circa 1491-1493 by Sandro Botticelli once in the church ==
- Now at Courtauld Gallery
  - Pala delle Convertite
- Now at Philadelphia Museum of Art
  - Magdalen listens to Christ preaching
  - Feast in House of Simon
  - Noli me tangere
  - Communion and Assumption of the Magdalen

== Sources ==
- Sherill Cohen, The Evolution of Women's Asylums Since 1500: From Refuges for Ex-prostitutes to Shelters for Battered Women, ISBN 9780195051643
- Sharon Strocchia, Nuns and Nunneries of Renaissance Florence, ISBN 9780801892929
