= Antonio Puglieschi =

Italian painter

Antonio Puglieschi (Florence, 1660 – Florence, 1732) was an Italian painter of the late Baroque period, active mainly in Florence. he trained initially with Pietro Dandini in Florence, but then went to work in Rome with Ciro Ferri. The church of San Giovannino degli Scolopi in Florence, which formerly had been a Jesuit church, has a canvas by Puglieschi of St Ignatius of Loyola before the Virgin. He also has a canvas in San Frediano in Cestello. One of his pupils was Giuseppe Bottani.

== Sources ==
- French Wikipedia Entry
- Lanzi, Luigi (1828). Thomas Roscoe (ed.). The History of Painting in Italy from the period of the Revival of the Fine Arts to the End of the Eighteenth Century; Volume VI containing the Schools of Lombardy, Mantua, Modena, Parma, Cremona, and Milan. London: W. Simpkin and R. Marshall. p. 342.
