= Niccolò Lapi =

Italian painter

Niccolò Lapi (Florence, c. 1667–1732) was an Italian painter of the Baroque period, active mainly in Tuscany.

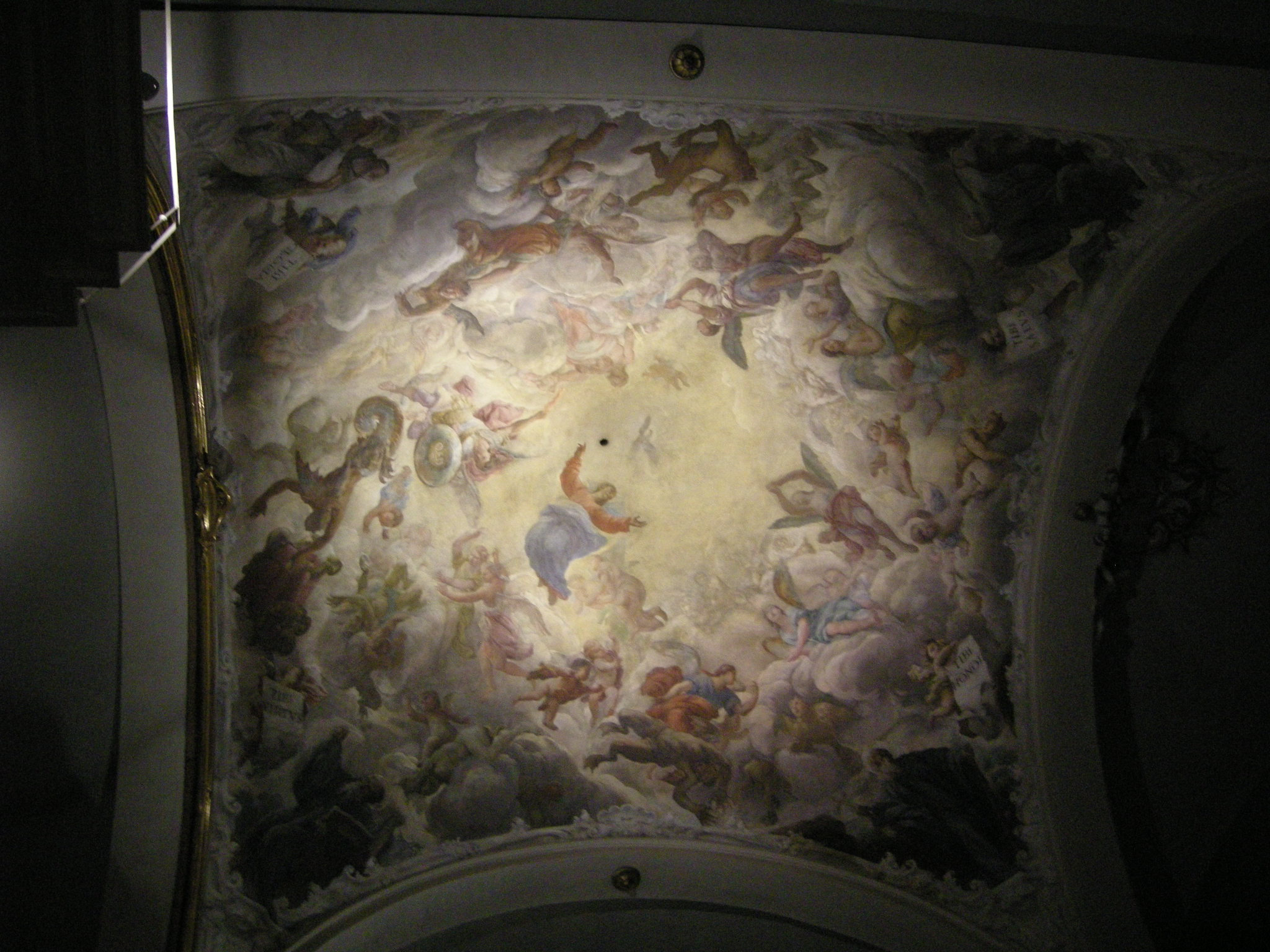
Ceiling in San Michele Visdomini

He is described as a follower of Giordano,

He painted for the church of San Jacopo Soprarno, the church of Santa Maria dei Candeli, and the church of San Michele Visdomini. In Vallombrosa there are paintings, and at Figline Valdarno, there is a Martyrdom of the Blessed Tesauro Beccaria. He was patronized by the Prince Ferdinando de' Medici. Among his colleagues were Anton Domenico Gabbiani and Francesco Conti.

- Media related to Niccolò Lapi at Wikimedia Commons

== Sources ==
- Dizionario biografico degli italiani LXIII, Roma, Istituto dell'Enciclopedia Italiana, 2004
