= Matteo Bonechi =

Italian painter

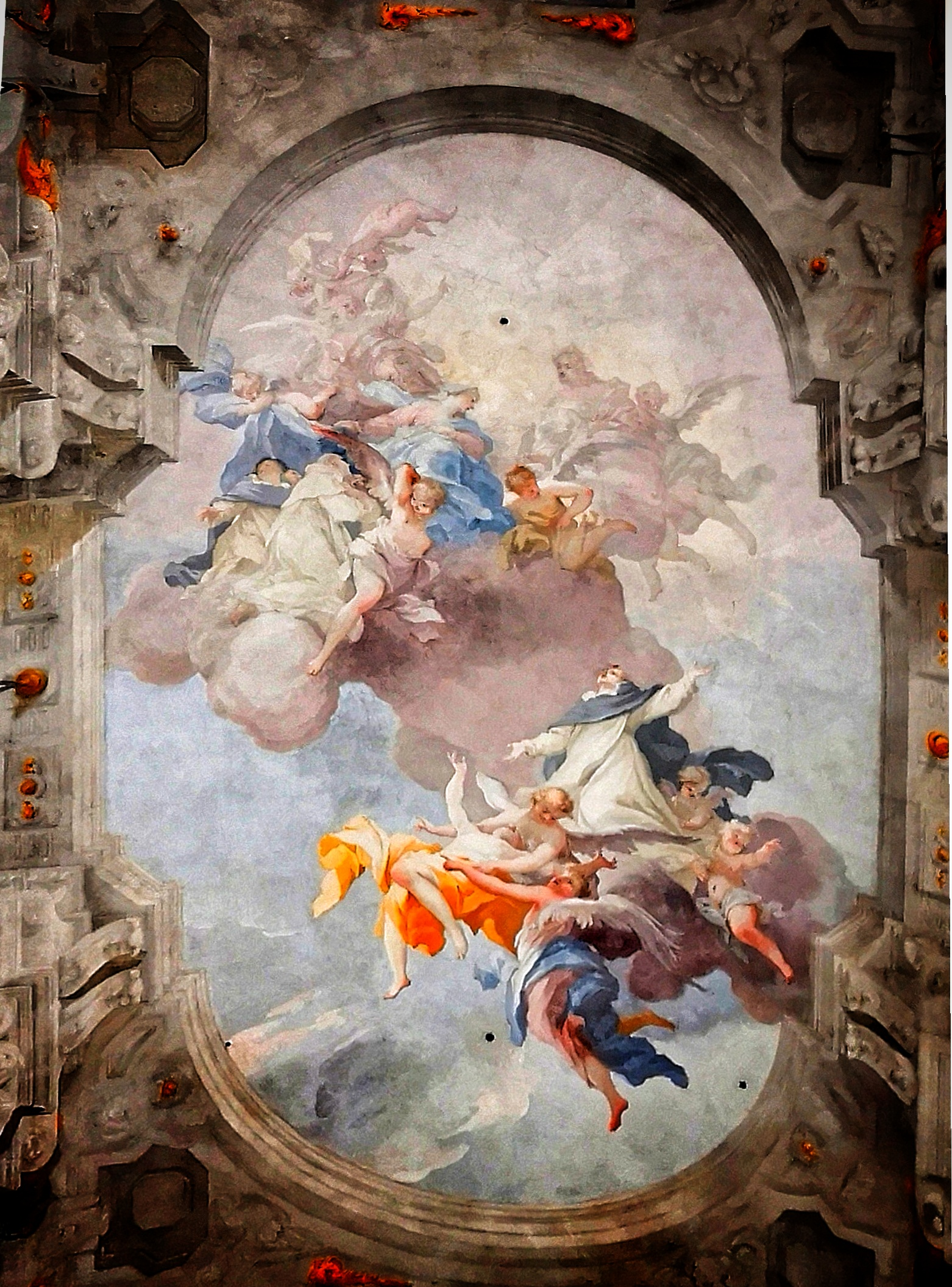
- The Glory of Saint Dominic, Chiesa di San Domenico, Fiesole
- Born: 8 November 1669; Florence, Grand Duchy of Tuscany
- Died: 27 February 1756 (aged 86); Florence, Grand Duchy of Tuscany
- Education: Giovanni Camillo Sagrestani
- Known for: Painting
- Movement: Baroque

Matteo Bonechi (8 November 1669 – 27 February 1756) was an Italian painter of the late Baroque period, active mainly in his native Florence. He trained under Giovanni Camillo Sagrestani. He also executed works in the church of San Frediano in Cestello, in the Oltrarno district of Florence. He also painted for the Palazzo Capponi-Covoni near the Nunziata in Florence. He died in Florence aged 86.

== Sources ==
- Mosco, Marilena (1969). "BONECHI, Matteo". Dizionario Biografico degli Italiani (in Italian). Vol. 11: Boccadibue–Bonetti. Rome: Istituto dell'Enciclopedia Italiana. ISBN 978-88-12-00032-6.
- Lanzi, Luigi (1828). Thomas Roscoe (ed.). The History of Painting in Italy from the period of the Revival of the Fine Arts to the End of the Eighteenth Century; Volume VI containing the Schools of Lombardy, Mantua, Modena, Parma, Cremona, and Milan. London: W. Simpkin and R. Marshall. pp. 348–349.
