= Ranieri Del Pace =

Italian painter

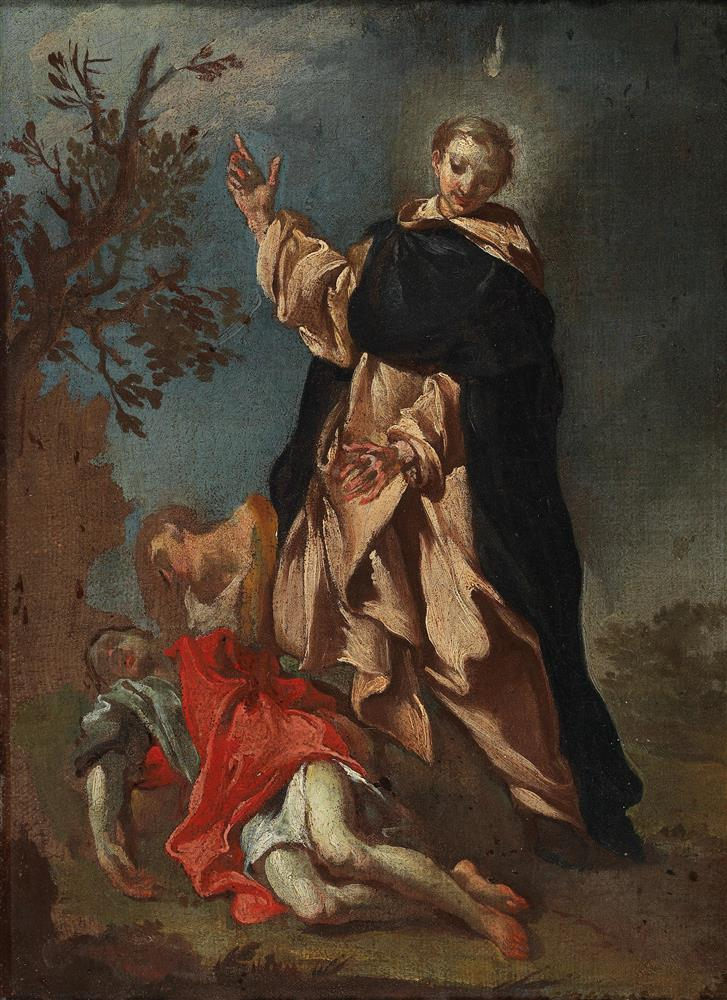
- Saint Vincent Ferrer, c. 1709, Palais Dorotheum, Vienna
- Born: 7 May 1681; Pisa, Grand Duchy of Tuscany
- Died: 27 February 1738 (aged 56); Florence, Grand Duchy of Tuscany
- Education: Giovanni Camillo Sagrestani
- Known for: Painting
- Movement: Baroque

Ranieri Del Pace (7 May 1681 in Pisa – 27 February 1738), also called Giovanni Batista Ranieri Del Pace, was an Italian painter of the late Baroque period, active mainly in Tuscany.

He helped design celebratory floats to celebrate the canonization of Pope Pius V and painted frescoes of the stories of St. Pius the Palazzo Vescovile in Prato, a Martrydom of St Sebastian for the church of Santissima Annunziata in Capannoli, a Presentation of Jesus at the temple for the church of San Filippo Neri in Cortona, and for the church of Santi Andrea e Lucia a Ripoli, Cascina.

== Gallery ==
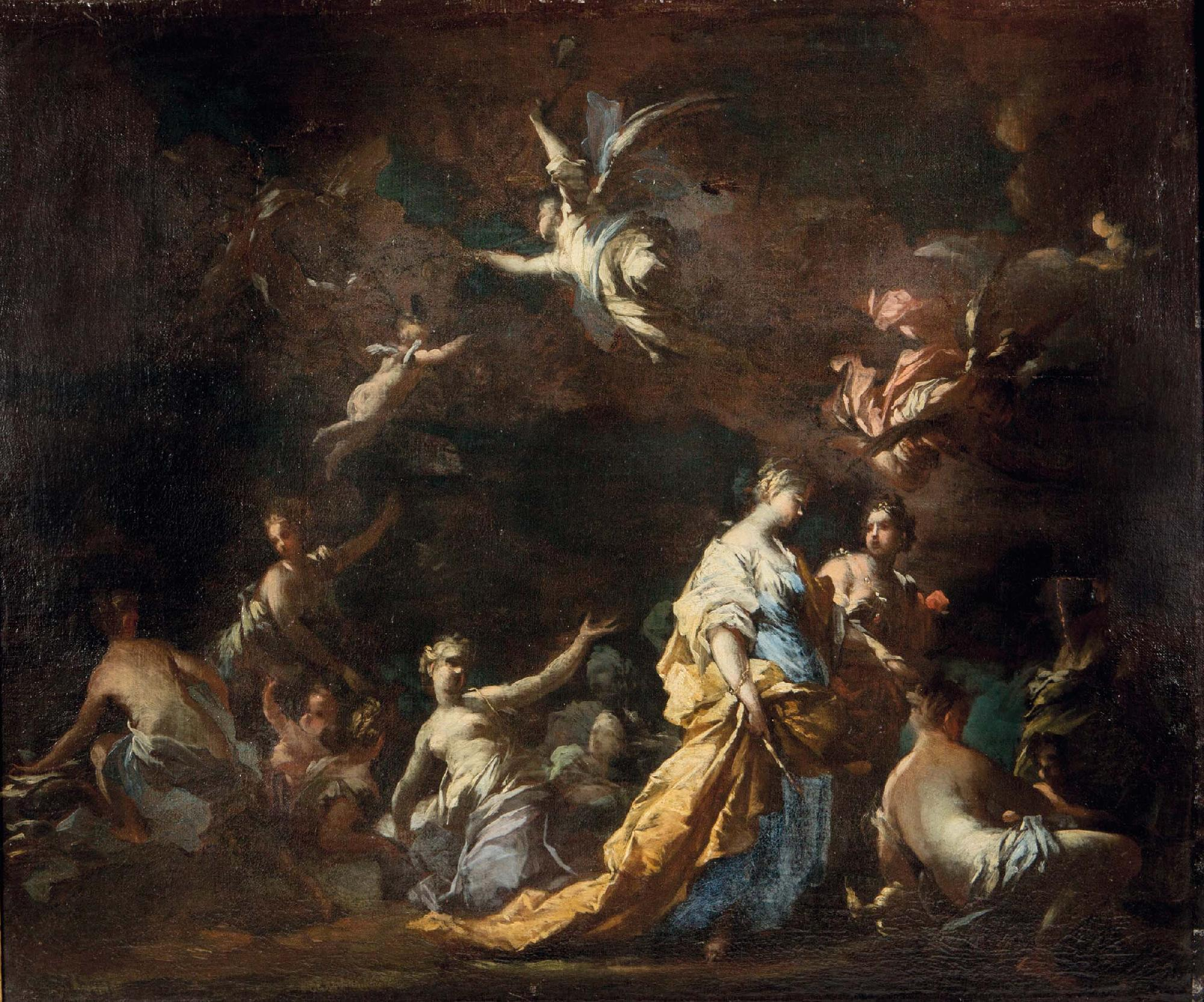
Mythological scene, priv. col.

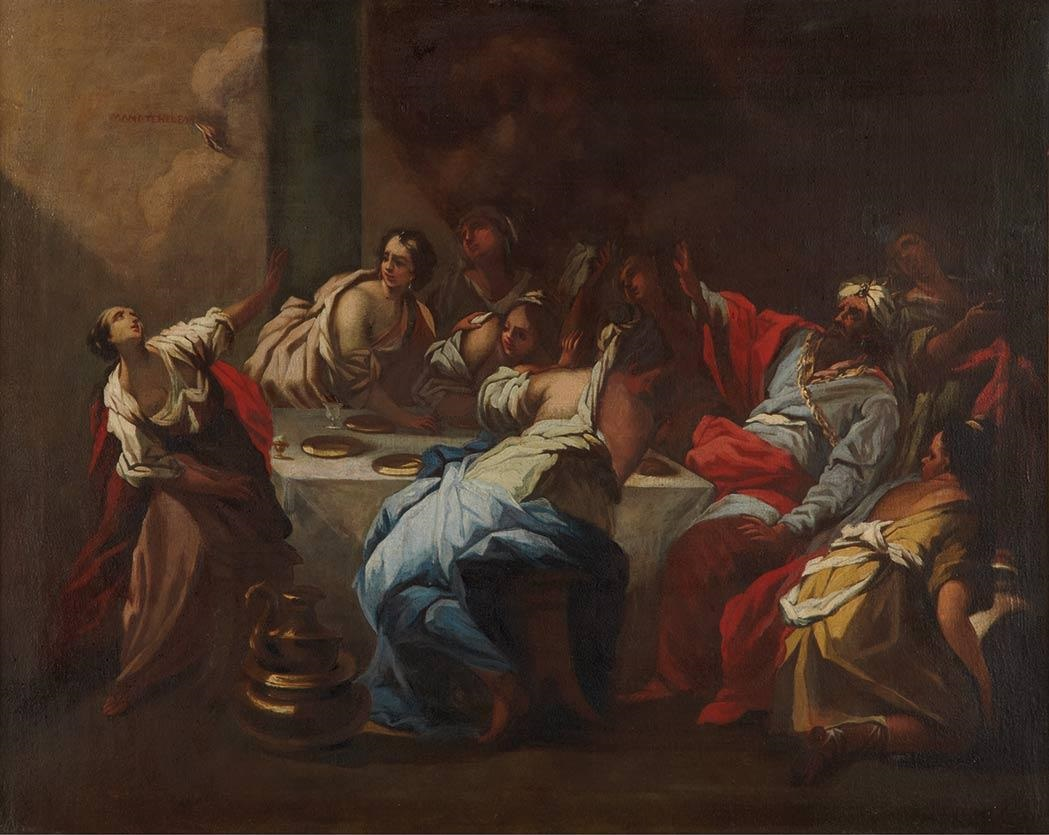
Belshazzar's Feast, priv. col.

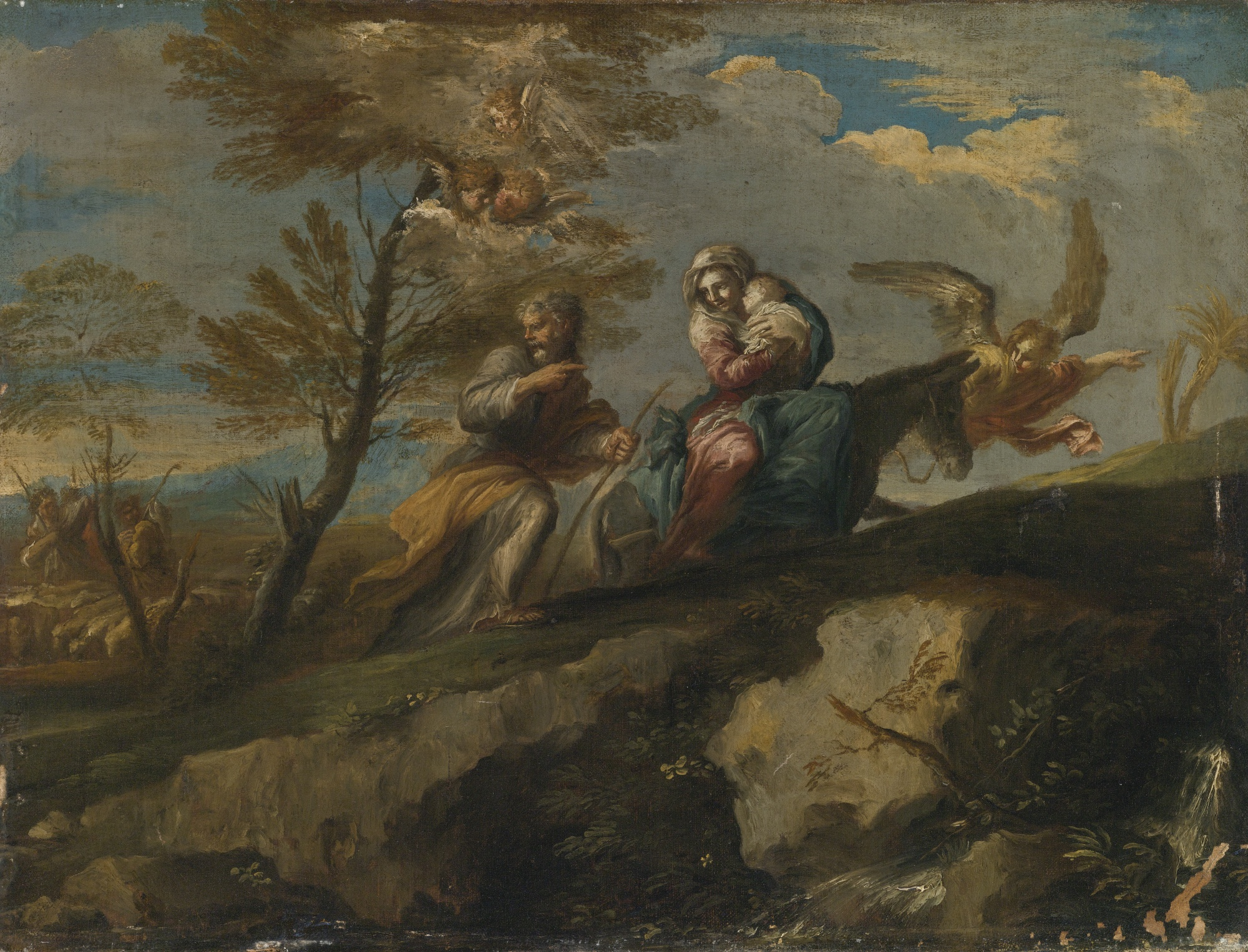
Flight into Egypt, First Congregational Church, Stoneham, Massachusetts

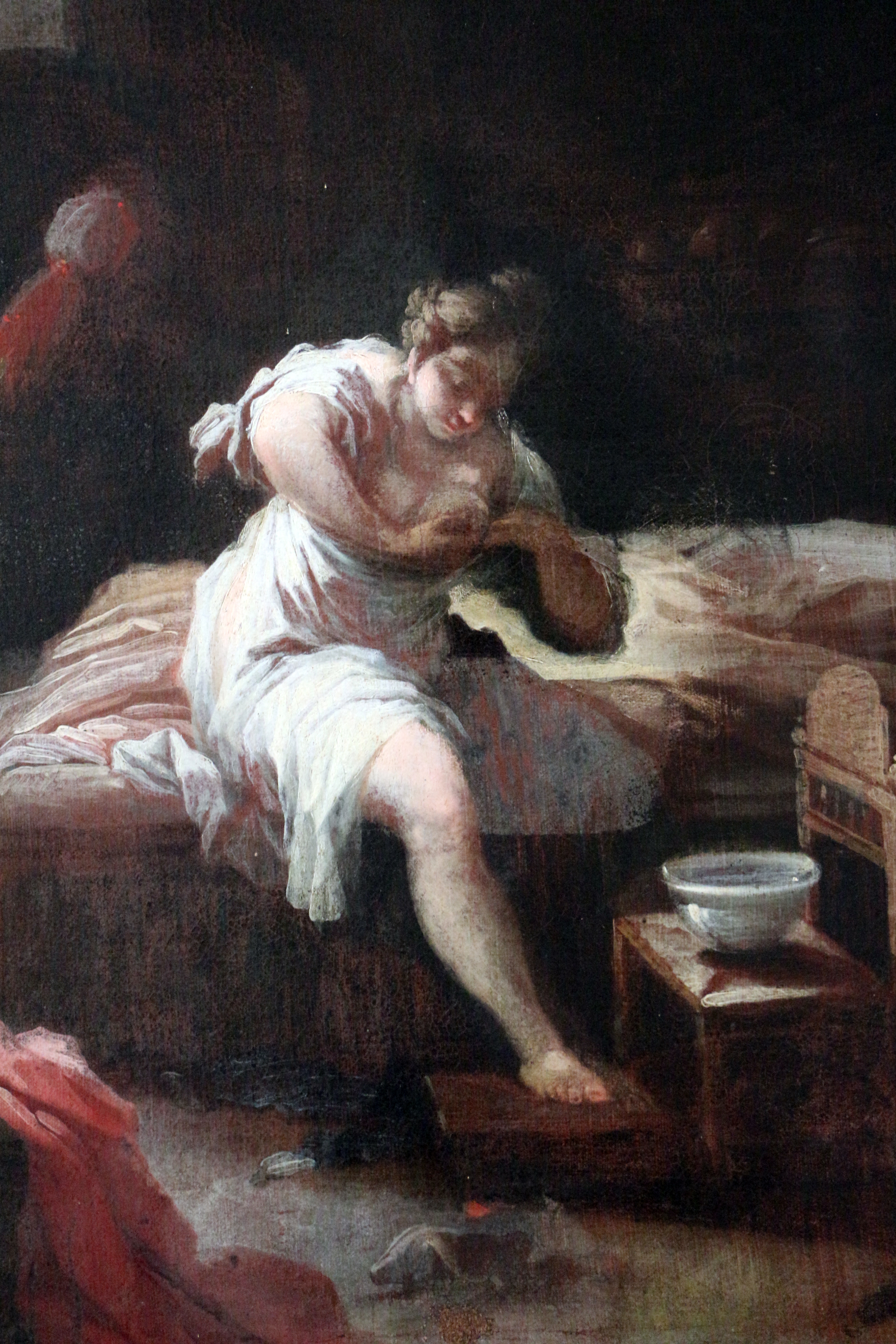
The Flea-Catcher, Ravenna Art Museum

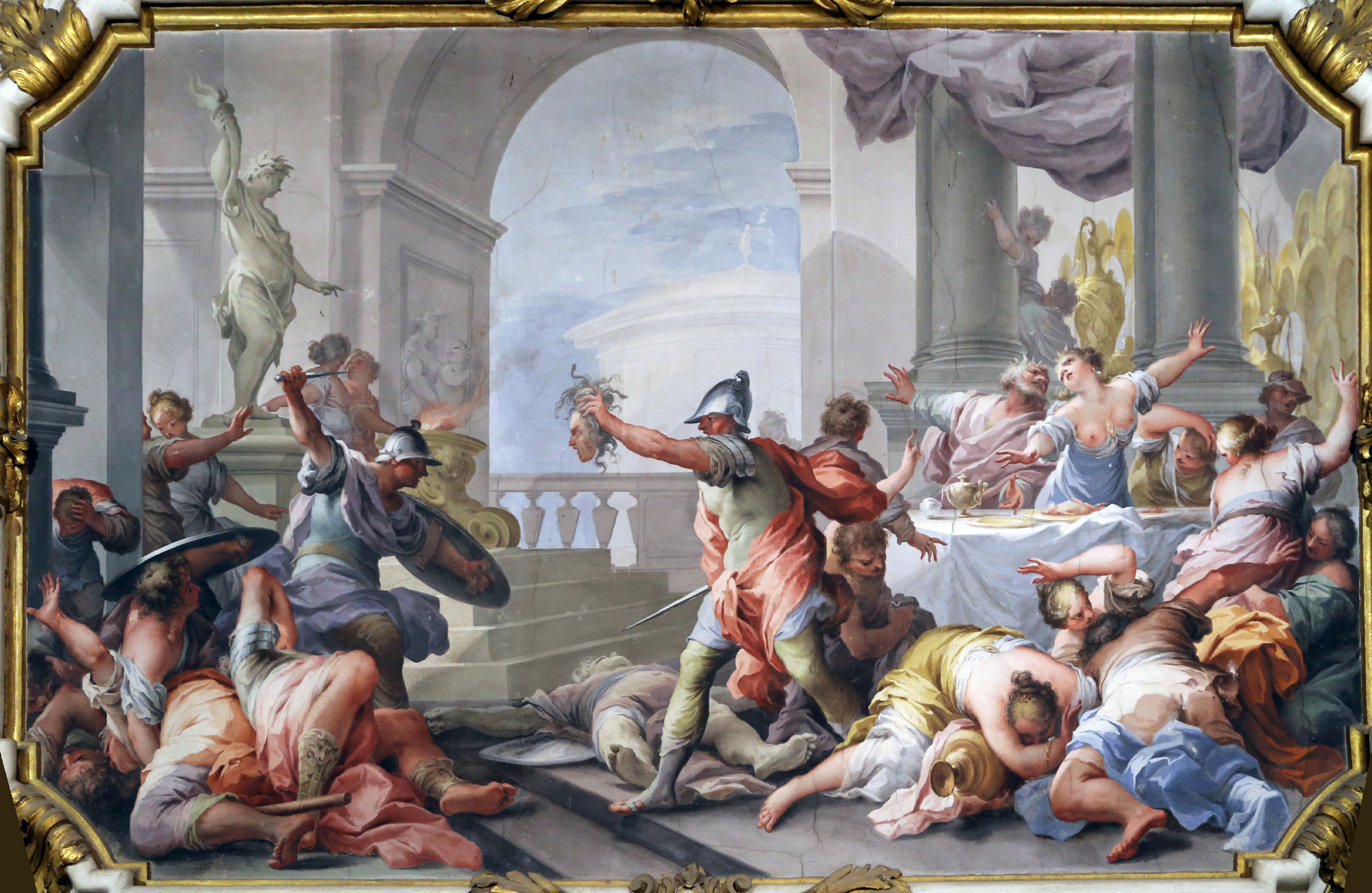
Perseus breaks into the wedding of his mother Danae and Polydectes, Palazzo Magnani Feroni, Florence

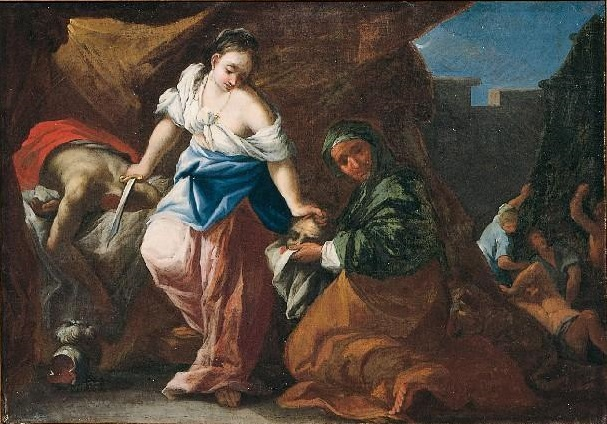
Judith Beheading Holofernes, priv. col.

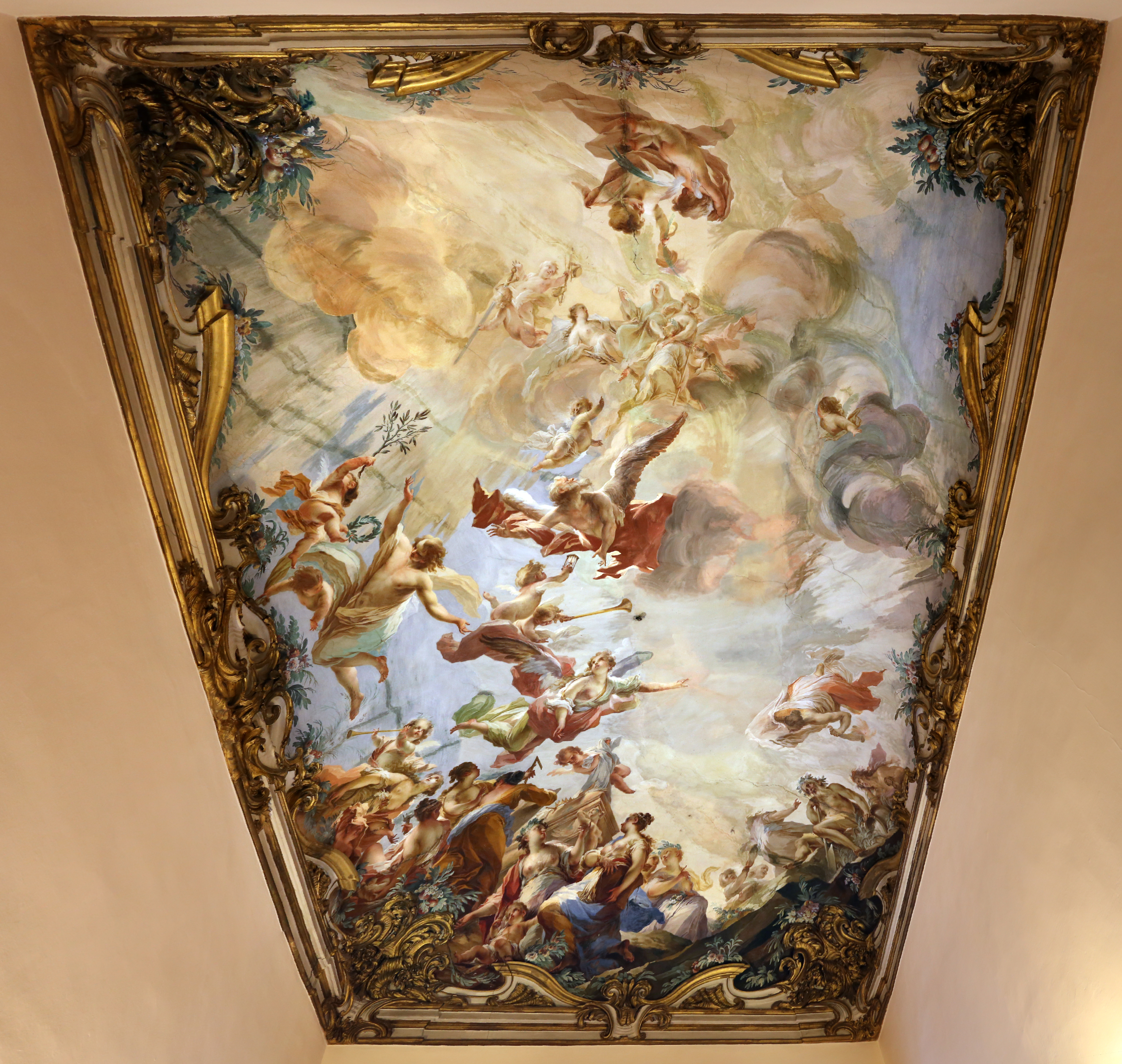
Time that conquers vices and exalts virtues, Palazzo Tempi, Florence

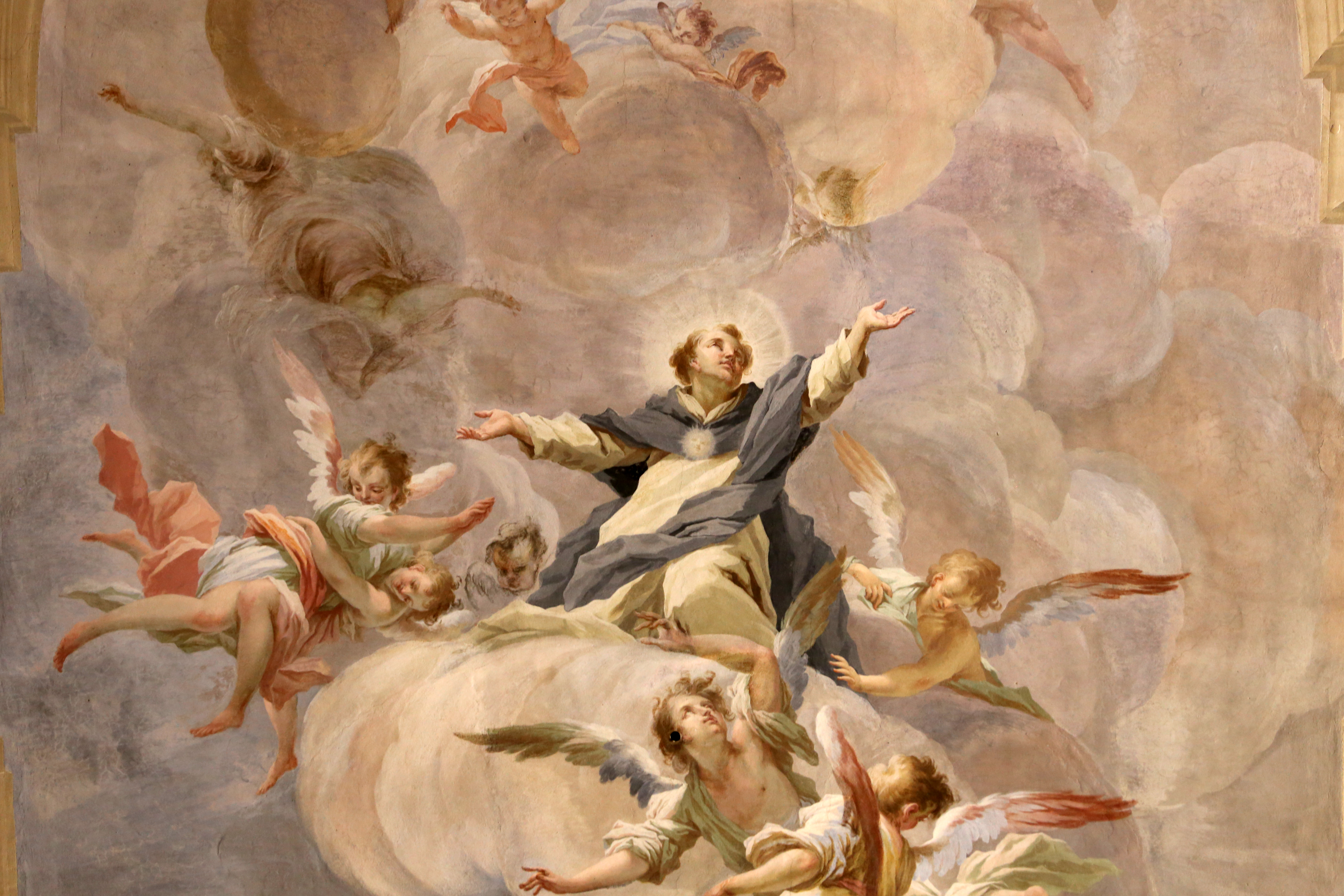
St. Thomas Aquinas in Glory (Detail), Oratory of St Thomas Aquinas, Florence

== Sources ==
- Lanzi, Luigi (1828). Thomas Roscoe (ed.). The History of Painting in Italy from the period of the Revival of the Fine Arts to the End of the Eighteenth Century, translated by Thomas Roscoe; Volume VI containing the Schools of Lombardy, Mantua, Modena, Parma, Cremona, and Milan. London: W. Simpkin and R. Marshall. p. 346.
