= Antonio Montauti =

Italian sculptor

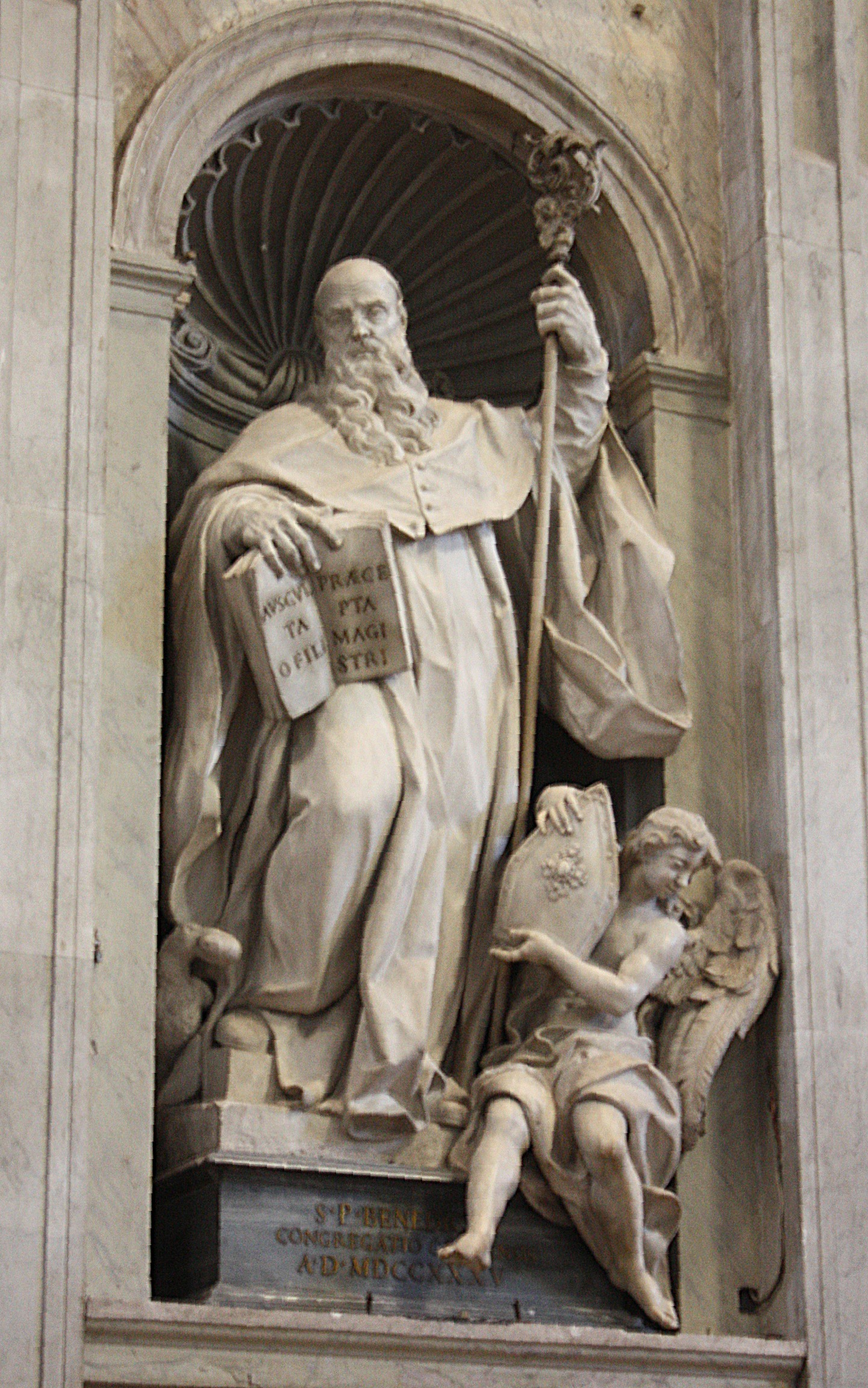
- Statue of St. Benedict in Saint Peter's Basilica
- Born: 14 November 1683; Florence, Grand Duchy of Tuscany
- Died: 1746 (aged 62–63); Rome, Papal States
- Education: Giuseppe Piamontini
- Known for: Sculpture
- Movement: Baroque

Antonio Montauti (14 November 1683 – 1746) was an 18th-century Italian sculptor active in Florence, Grand Duchy of Tuscany and Rome, Papal States. He was noted both for his statuary, busts, as well as for his smaller bronzes and medals.

== Biography ==
=== Early life ===
Antonio Montauti was born in Florence in 1685. A pupil of Giuseppe Piamontini, he was first active as a medalist; one of his earliest and most exquisite medals celebrated the visit of King Frederick IV of Denmark to Florence in 1708. On the obverse is a portrait of the King; on the reverse, a view of the city with a reclining river god personifying the Arno (Florence, Bargello). A medal of Conte Lorenzo Magalotti, dated 1712 (version, London, British Museum) has Apollo on the reverse, whose exaggerated sway in the hips is reflected in two later small bronzes (Palazzo Corsini, Rome). There are also two medals of the Grand Duke Gian Gastone de' Medici (before 1723 and 1731; both Florence, Bargello).

=== Career ===
From the mid 1710s Montauti began his career as a sculptor. About 1715, he carved two reliefs of St. Philip Neri, depicting the Ecstasy of Philip and the Distribution of Bread for the church of San Firenze in Florence. In 1721, a supposedly lost Ganymede and four other marbles he was carving for John Molesworth were described as his "first works"; however "Ganymede and the Eagle" plus a statue of Hebe, stated as being by Montauti and "probably commissioned by the Hon. John Molesworth", recently surfaced at the Christie's auction house, described as "the property of a lady" and having been originally purchased by Thomas Parker, 1st Earl of Macclesfield in around 1723-25 and kept thereafter at the latter's newly refurbished historic property Shirburn Castle until recent times, when they were sold for £79,250 each in 2009. In 1726, he made large marble statue of Saint Maria Maddalena de' Pazzi for the cloister of San Frediano in Cestello.

Montauti’s careful characterizations in the portrait medals are reflected in his marble portrait busts. One, of Gian Gastone de’ Medici (c. 1724; Florence, Hospital of Santa Maria Nuova), emphasizes the ugly features of large nose, pouting lips and jutting chin by using a schematic treatment for the wig.

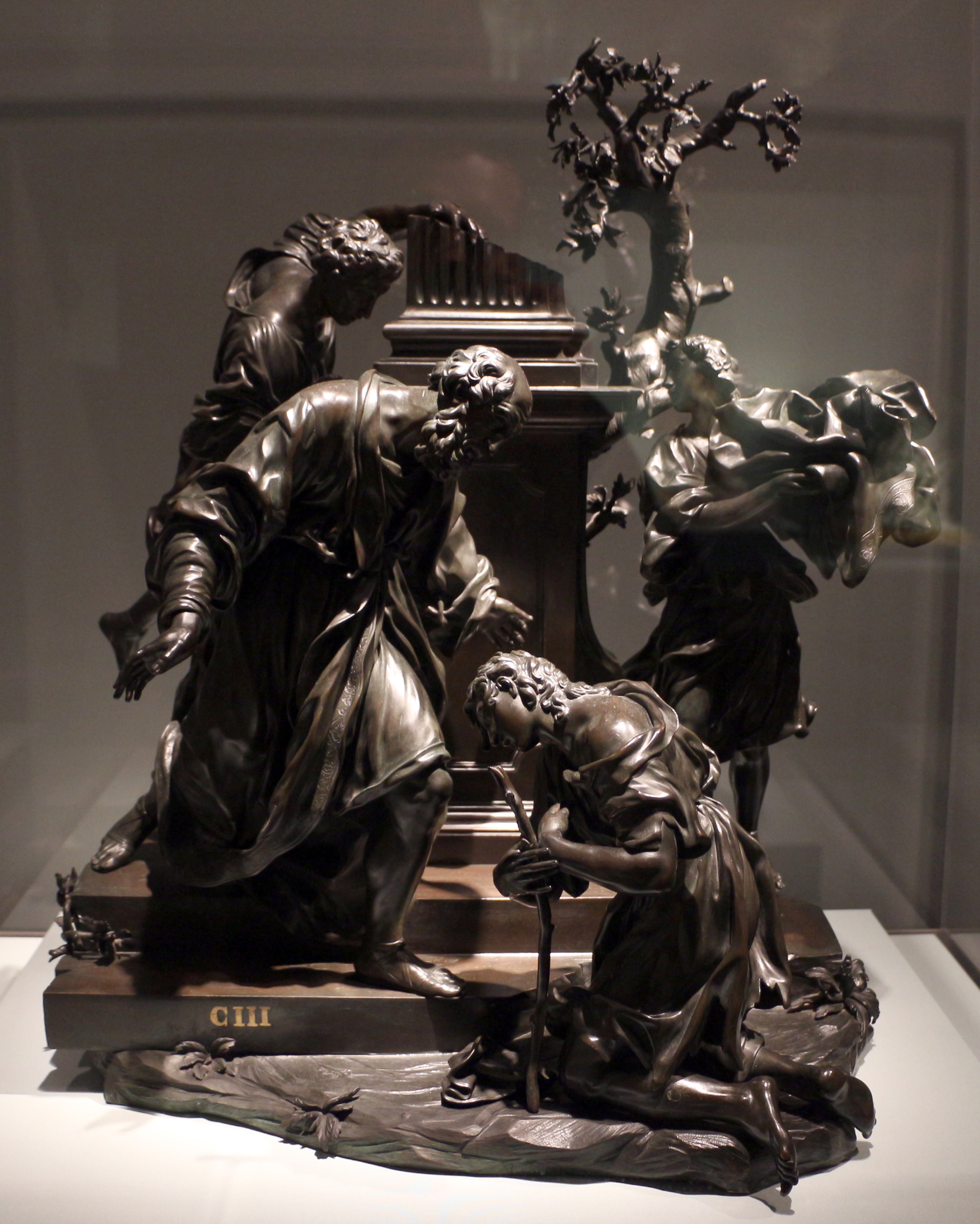
The Return of the Prodigal Son, bronze, 632×495×356 mm, 1724 (Detroit Institute of Arts)

Small bronzes also formed an important part of Montauti’s work. His masterpiece, the Return of the Prodigal Son, signed and dated 1724 (h. 631 mm; Detroit Institute of Arts), is one of 12 bronze groups made for the Electress Palatine Anna Maria Luisa de' Medici. The Prodigal Son is a fine example of the new dramatic treatment of pictorial groups that was emerging in Florence in the 1720s. A second version of the group (h. 650 mm) is in the National Museum Cardiff. Montauti does not seem to have made life-size marble statues before the mid-1720s. In Florence his most interesting examples are Innocence and Religion in the Cappella Maggiore of Santa Maria Maddalena dei Pazzi. Their animated drapery folds are descriptive of the form beneath; that of Innocence forms a strong, serpentine curve.

Montauti was commissioned to complete this series of Cardinal Virtues with Faith and Penitence opposite. However, these were executed later by Innocenzo Spinazzi. Montauti also contributed statues to the basilica of Mafra, Portugal, for which he carved St. Peter and St. Paul in 1732. St. Peter’s drapery still reveals the form beneath, whereas St. Paul’s heavy folds of drapery across the hips anticipate Montauti’s Roman works.

=== In Rome ===
In 1733 Montauti was called to Rome by the diplomat Cardinal Alamanno Salviati, for whom he may have made the second version of the Prodigal Son. Unfortunately, the contents of Montauti’s Florentine studio were shipwrecked during the move. His principal Roman commissions were St. Benedict (1735), one of the series of gigantic statues of the founders of religious orders in St. Peter's Basilica; and the life-size Pietà for the crypt of the Corsini Chapel in the Archbasilica of Saint John Lateran. The Pietà, completed before 1736, recalls the marble bas-relief of the same subject carved by Agostino Cornacchini for the crypt chapel in the basilica of Superga, Turin.

Montauti’s later works are characterized by a new, Roman monumentality, with more classical poses, full drapery and expressive faces. In the Pietà the expression on the Virgin’s face recalls those of Bernini’s ecstatic female figures, and the Instruments of the Passion are offset by heavy, cascading drapery. In 1735 Pope Clement XII appointed Montauti Architect of St. Peter’s (but there is no evidence that he ever worked as an architect); after this he appears to have lost interest in his career as a sculptor.

== Gallery ==
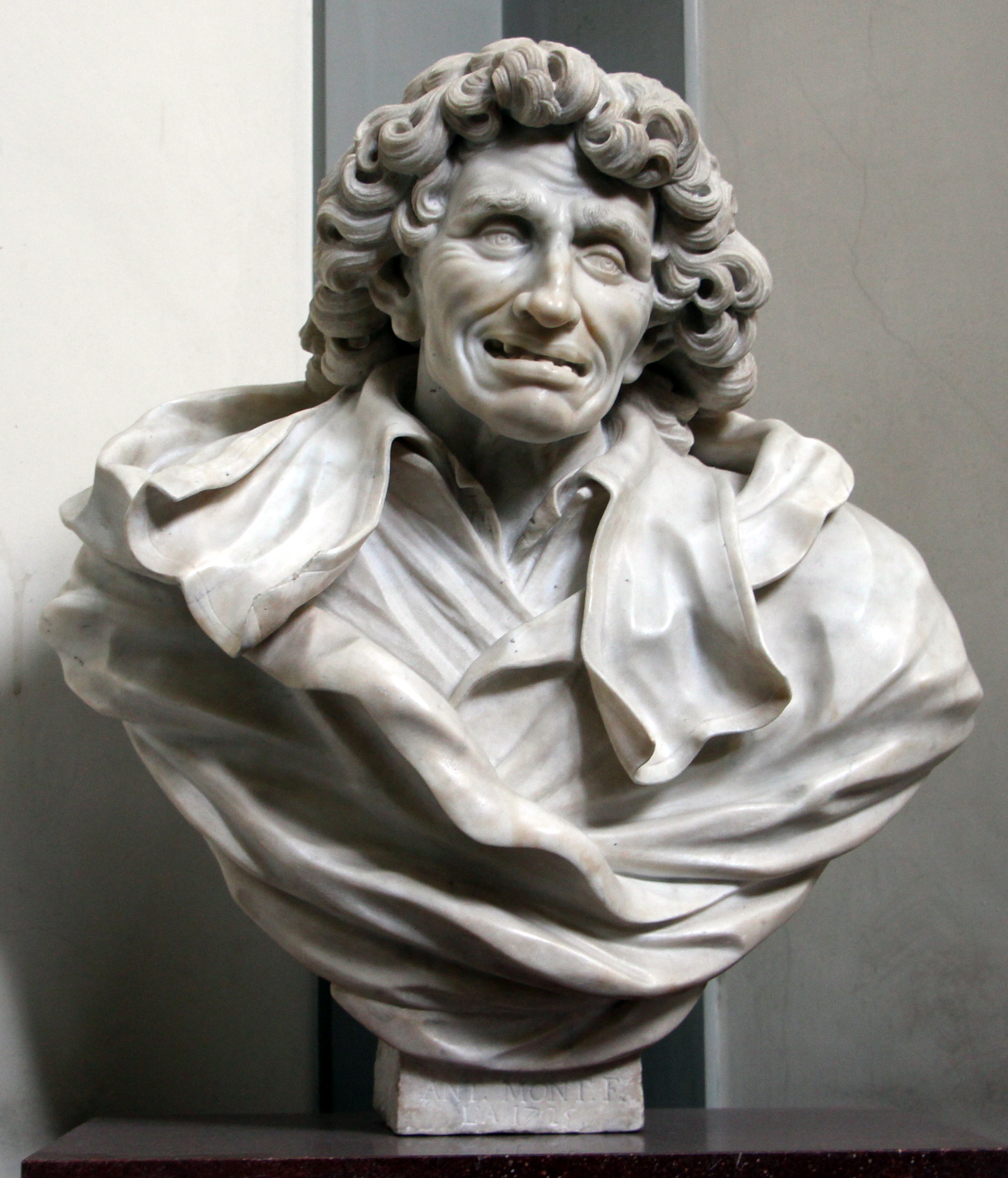
Bust of Antonio Magliabechi

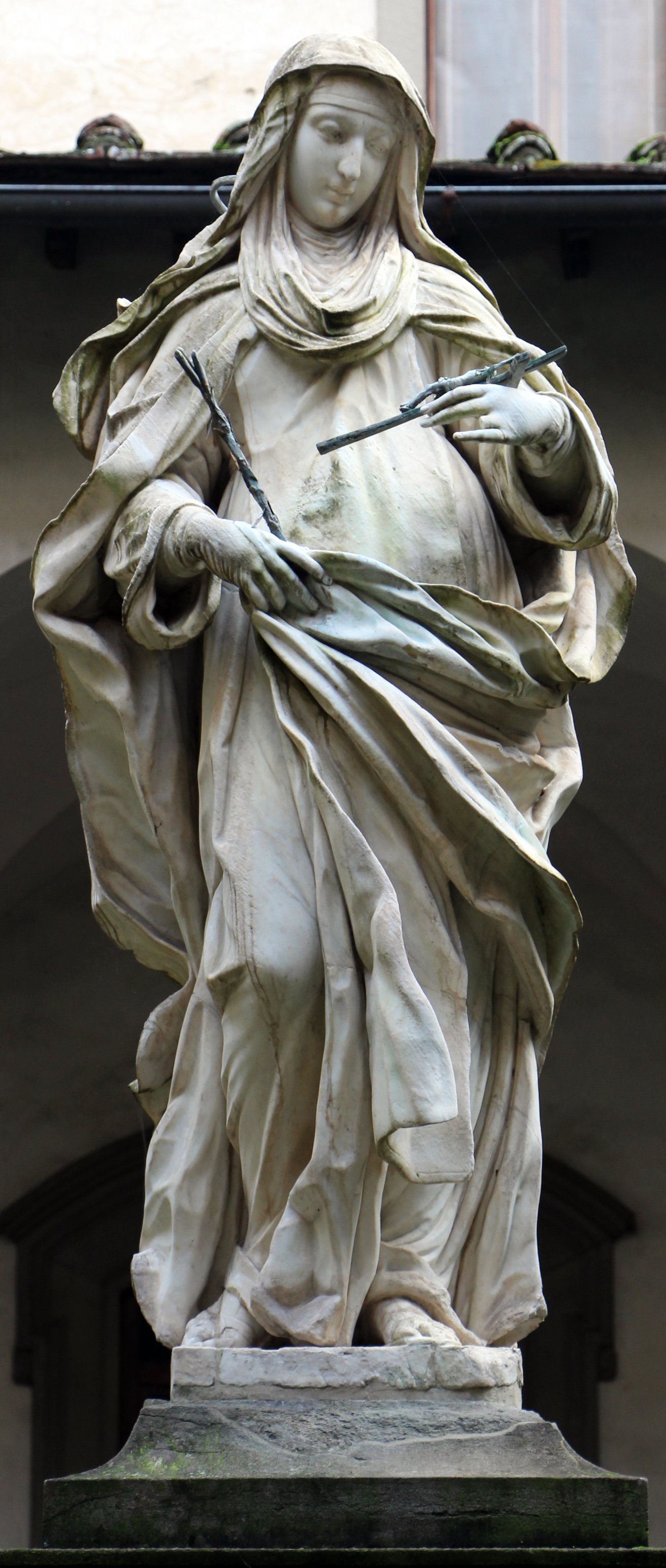
Saint Mary Magdalene de' Pazzi

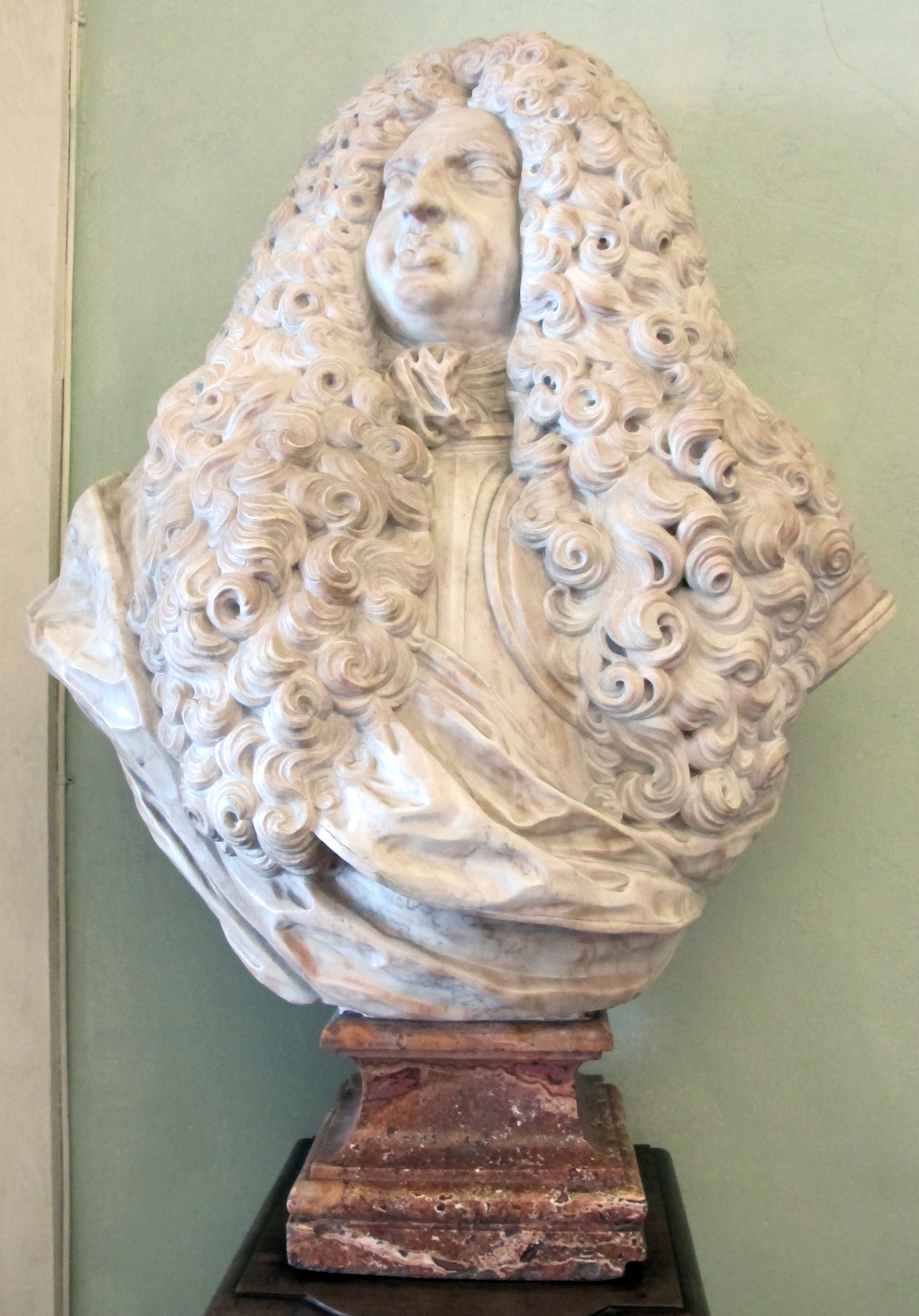
Bust of Gian Gastone de' Medici

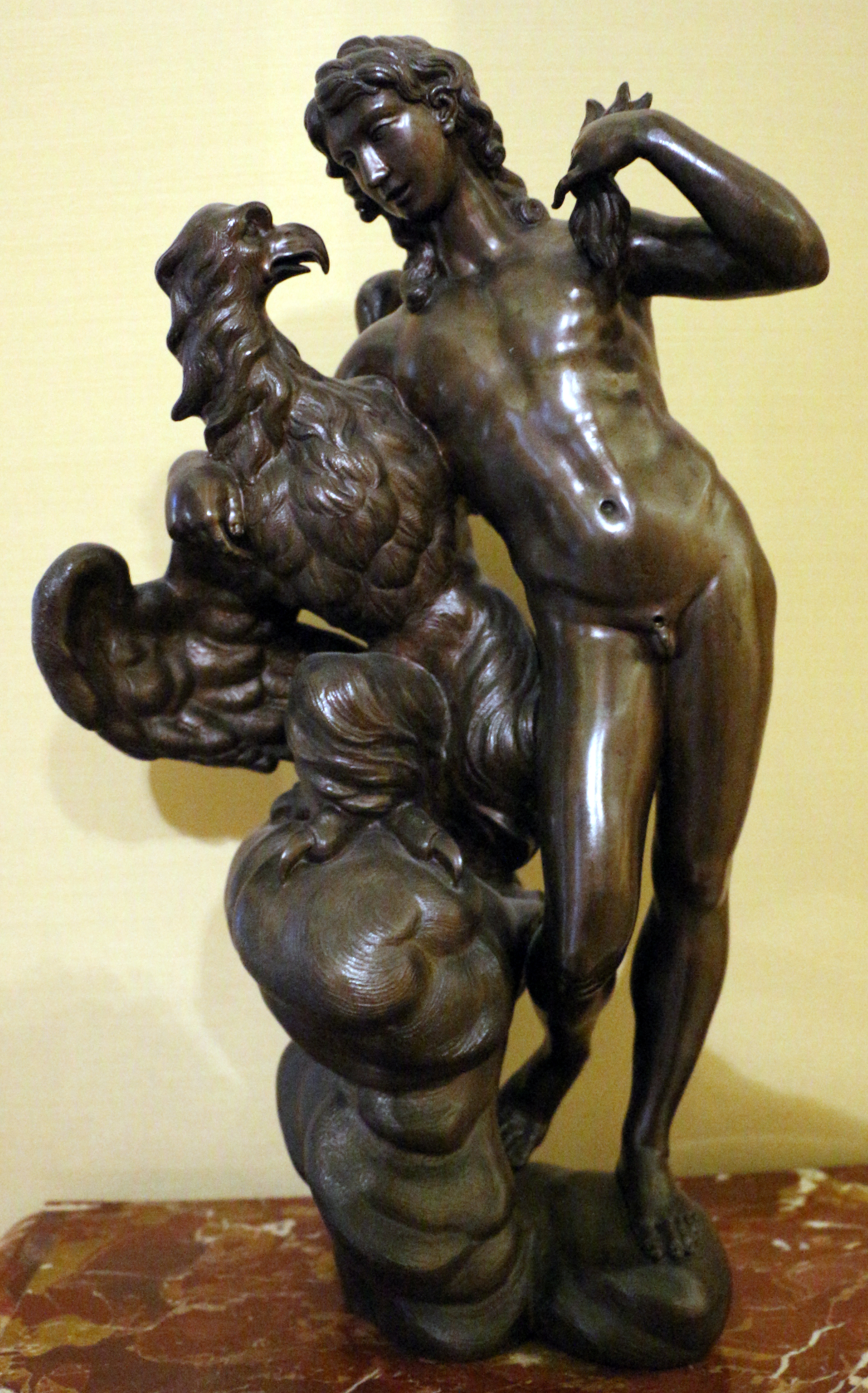
Ganymede and the Eagle

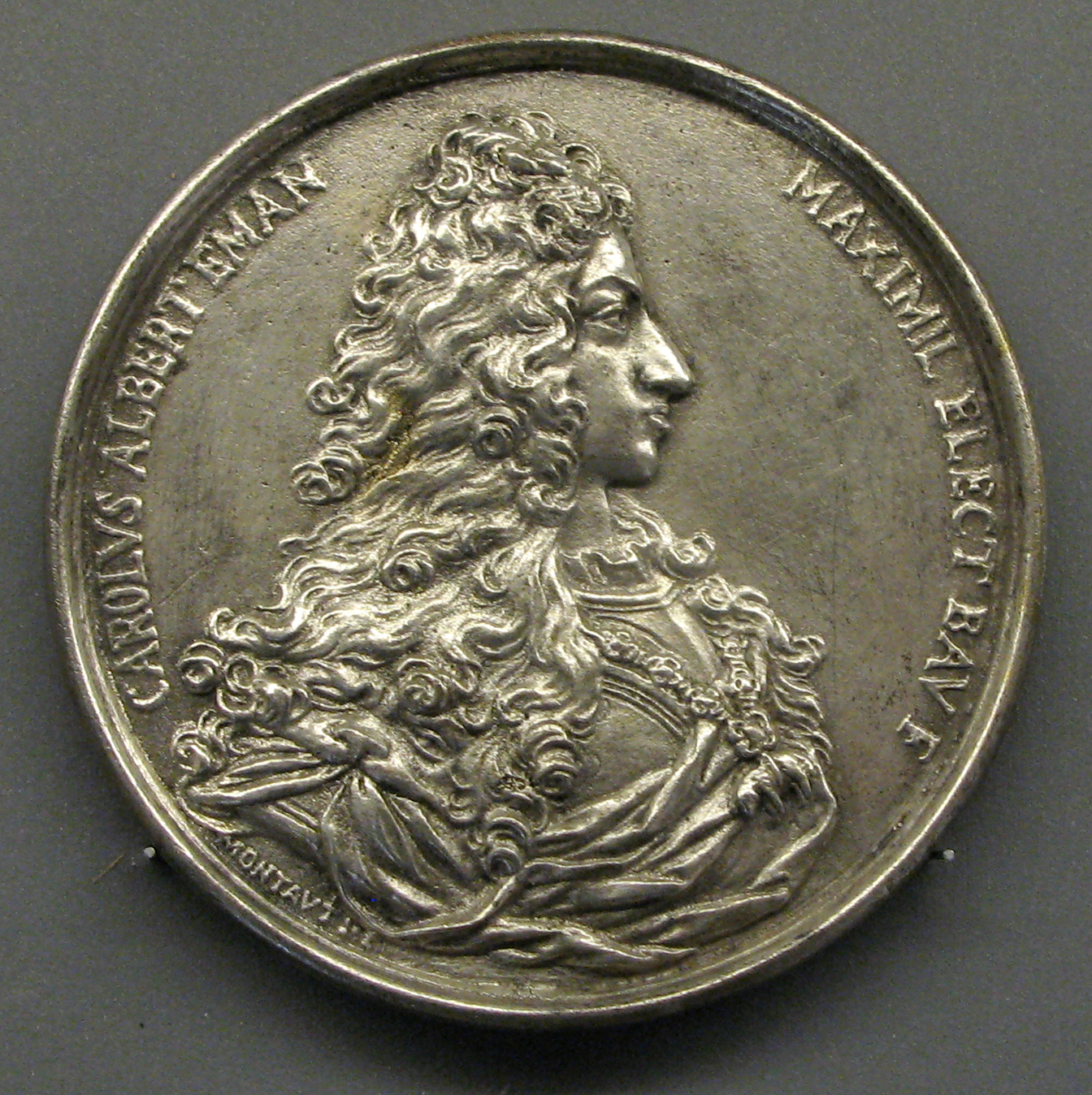
Charles VII, Holy Roman Emperor

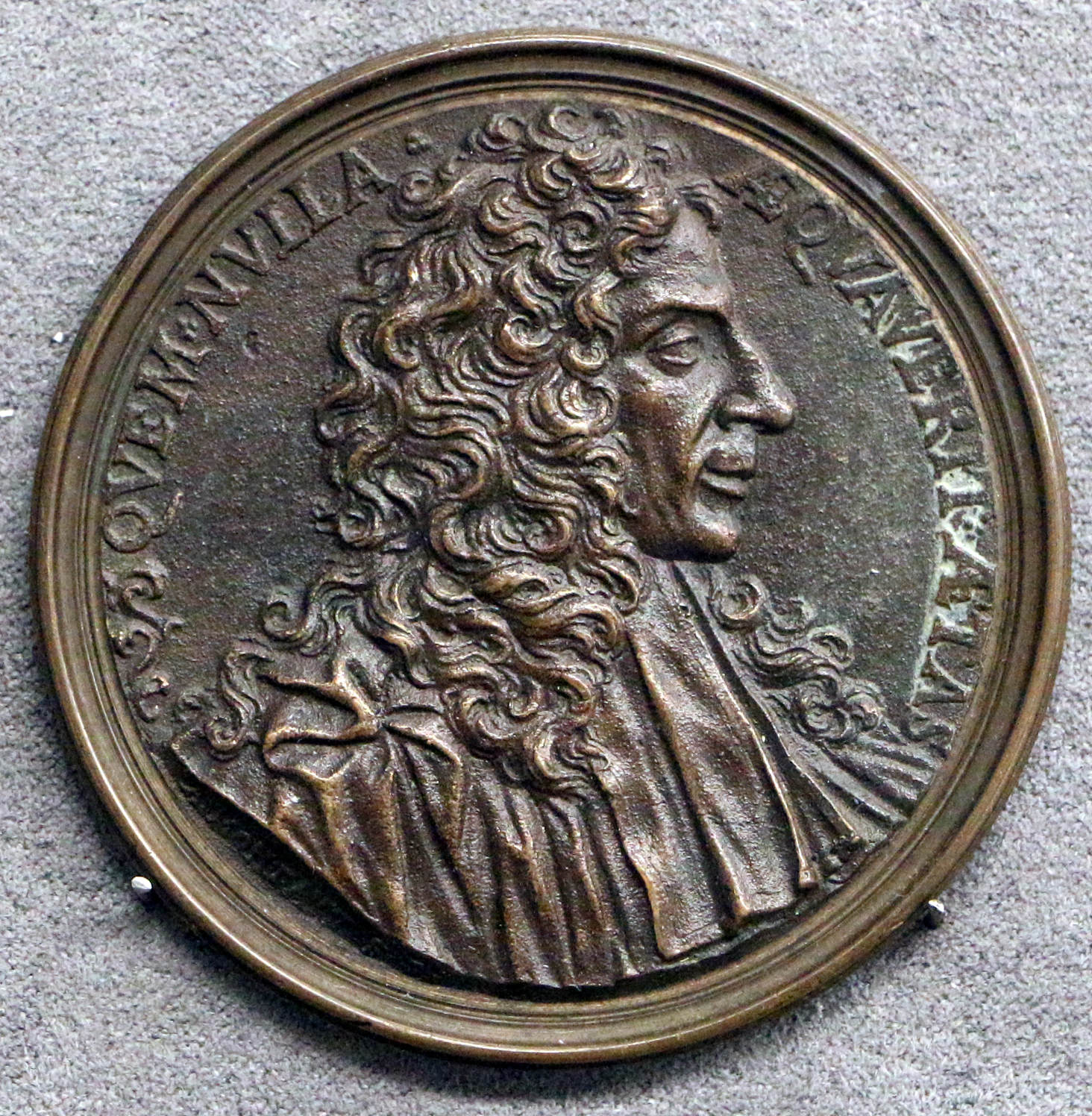
Medal of Filippo Buonarroti
