= San Pietro a Montebuoni =

Church building in Impruneta, Italy

Coordinates: 43°42′16.7″N 11°12′56.3″E

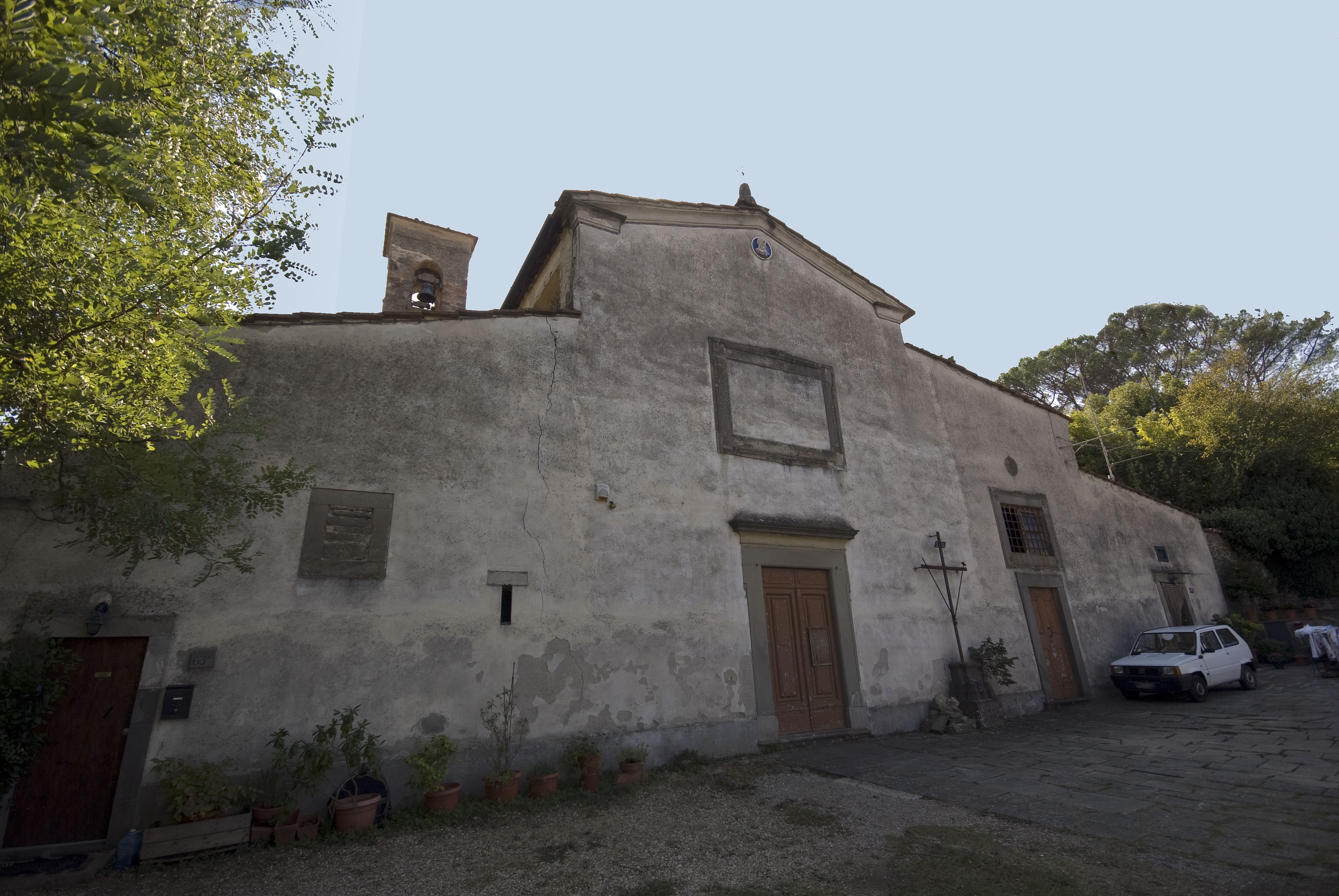
Facade of church

San Pietro a Montebuoni is a Roman Catholic church located in the neighborhood of Tavarnuzze, rising west and near the SR3 road from Florence to Siena, of the town of Impruneta in the province encompassed by the metropolitan city of Florence, region of Tuscany, Italy.

== History ==
The church is documented in 1156 as San Pietro de muliere mala,. It was under the patronage first of the Buondelmonti family, then by the Capitani di Parte, and then under the Grand-Duchy of Tuscany government. It was rebuilt first in the 14th-century, with other refurbishments subsequently. It became a priory in 1518. The interior still houses a Madonna and Child by Lorenzo di Bicci.

The frescoes in the apse depicting Glory of St Peter on the ceiling and Calling of Saints Peter and Andrew and Liberation of St Peter in lunettes, all the 18th-century painter Giacinto Fabbroni, were recently restored in 2018.
