= San Frediano in Cestello =

Church in Florence, Italy

Coordinates: 43°46′11.97″N 11°14′38.28″E

Church of Saint Fridianus (Chiesa di San Frediano in Cestello)
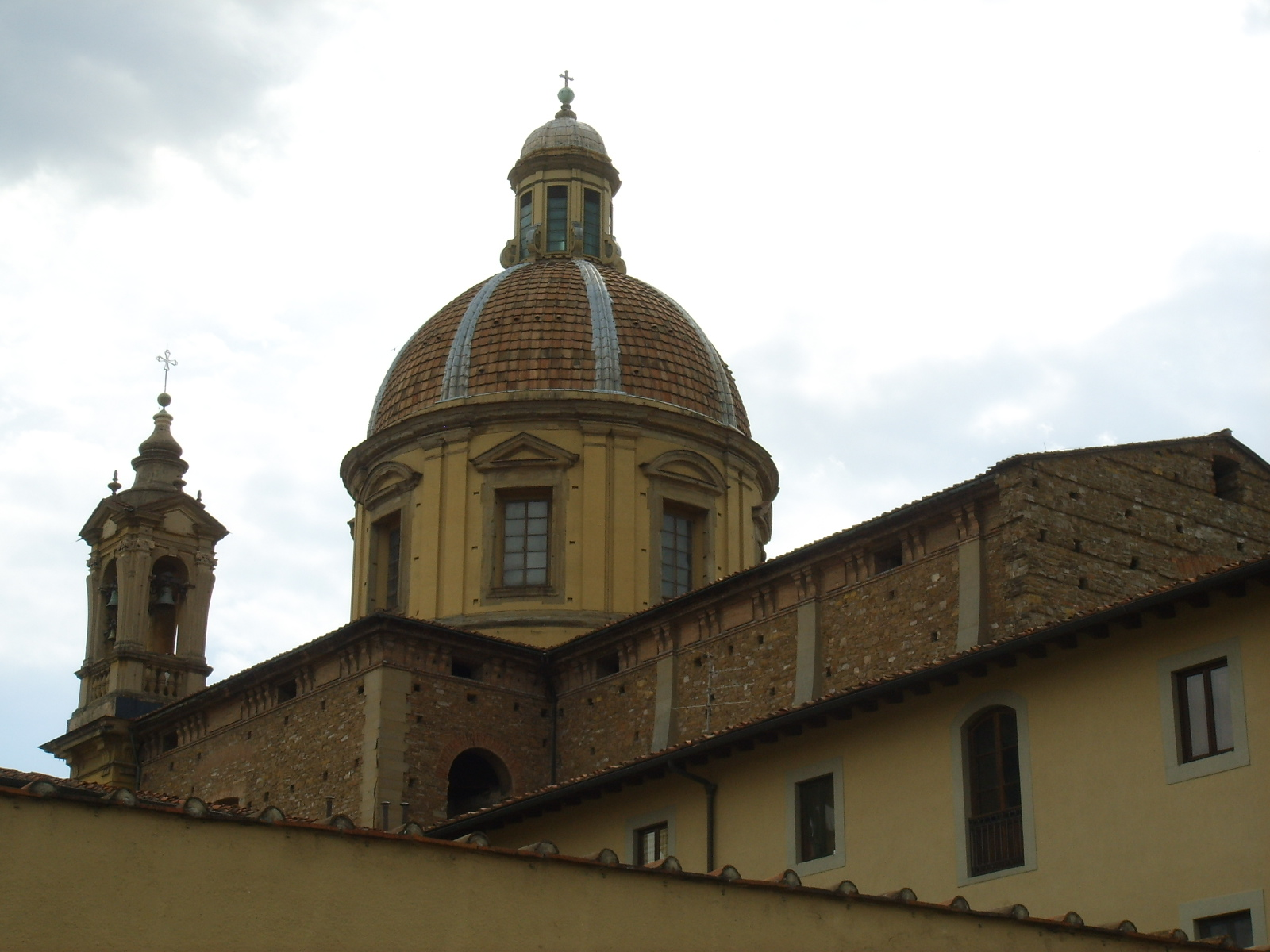
- Dome and bell tower of San Frediano.

Religion
- Affiliation: Roman Catholic
- Province: Florence

Location
- Location: Florence, Italy
- Interactive map of Church of Saint Fridianus (Chiesa di San Frediano in Cestello)

Architecture
- Architects: Gherardo Silvani; Giulio Cerutti; Antonio Maria Ferri
- Type: Church
- Groundbreaking: 1680
- Completed: 1689

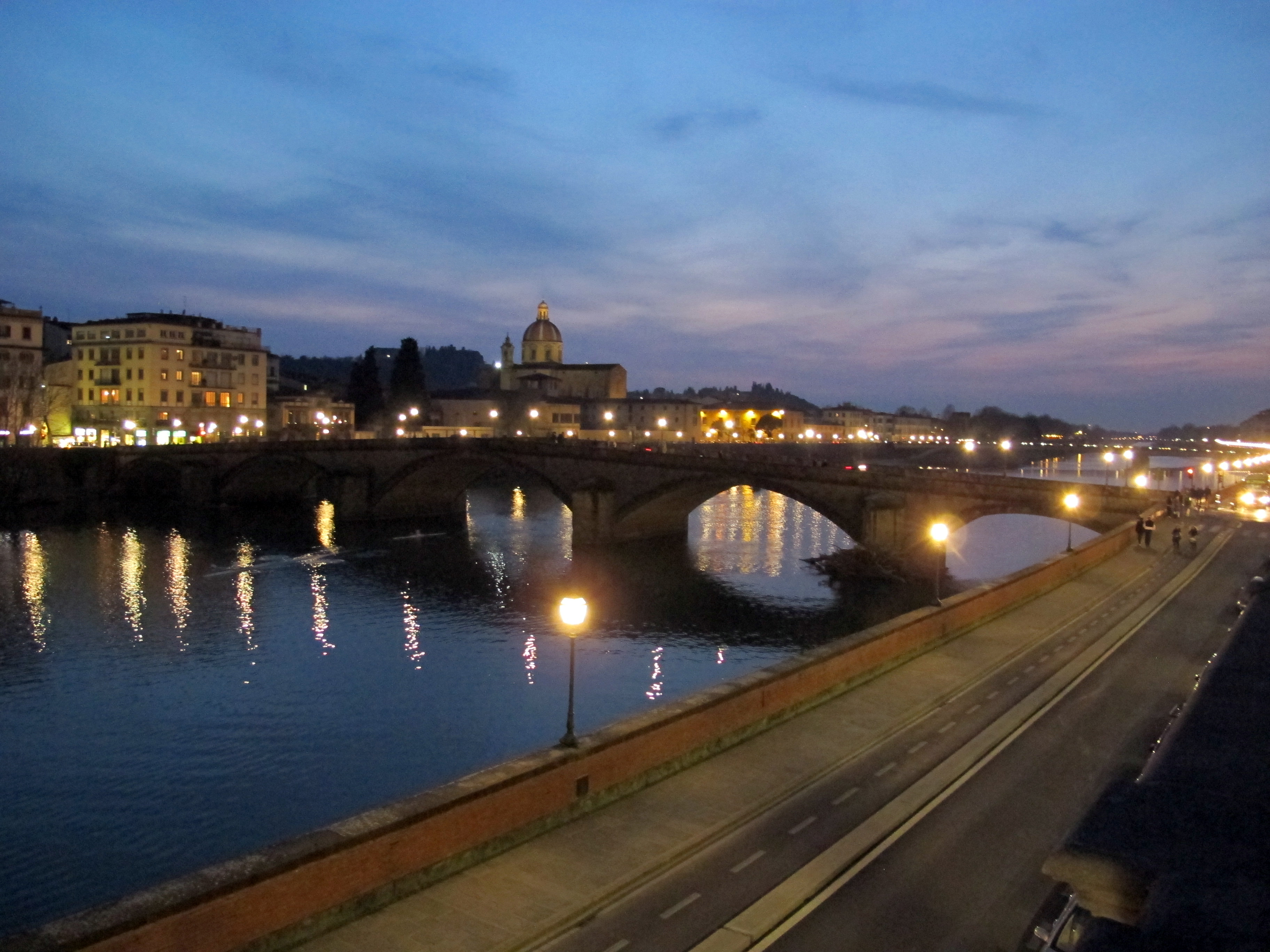
View from the terrace of Palazzo Corsini

San Frediano in Cestello is a Baroque-style, Roman Catholic church in the Oltrarno section of Florence, region of Tuscany, Italy. The name cestello derives from the Cistercians who occupied the church in 1628. Previously the site had a 1450s church attached to the cloistered Carmelite convent of Santa Maria degli Angeli.

== History ==
The church is dedicated to St Fridianus, an early Christian Irish pilgrim who became bishop of Lucca; putatively he miraculously crossed a swollen Arno river near this spot. A church at the site was present before the 11th century. Starting during the papacy of Paul II in the 1460s, the church and adjacent convent were patronized by the Soderini Family. This continued under Cardinal Francesco Soderini. The church suffered under the flood of 1557; the monks had to move to the nearby monastery of the Carmine.

In 1680–1689, the church was rebuilt on the designs of Gherardo Silvani and Giulio Cerutti. The imposing cupola and bell tower added in 1689 by Antonio Maria Ferri.

In the former convent of the site lived and died Saint Magdalena de Pazzi (1566–1607), born to a noble Florentine family. She was renowned for her ecstasies, during which she had visions of the divine will favoring church reforms. She was canonised in 1662. Her body was transferred to the church in central Florence that bears her name.

The interior of the dome is frescoed with a Glory of the Magdalen and Virtue (1702–1718) by Antonio Domenico Gabbiani. The cloisters contain a statue of St Maria Maddalena de' Pazzi (1726) by Antonio Montauti and a St. Bernard of Clairvaux defeats the devil (1702) by Giuseppe Piamontini (1702). The latter cloister was designed by Gherardo and Pier Francesco Silvani.

The refectory has a Last supper and a painting by Bernardino Poccetti. In the transept is a Madonna in glory with saints by Francesco Curradi and a painting of a Crucifixion with saints and Martyrdom of St. Lawrence (late 15th century) by Jacopo del Sellaio. In the third chapel to the left, is a polychrome wooden Madonna and child (1350) by a follower of Nino, the son of Andrea Pisano, and frescoes of the Scenes from the life of the founder of the Cistercian order (1688–1689) by Pier Dandini.
