= Francesco Boschi =

Italian painter (1619–1675)

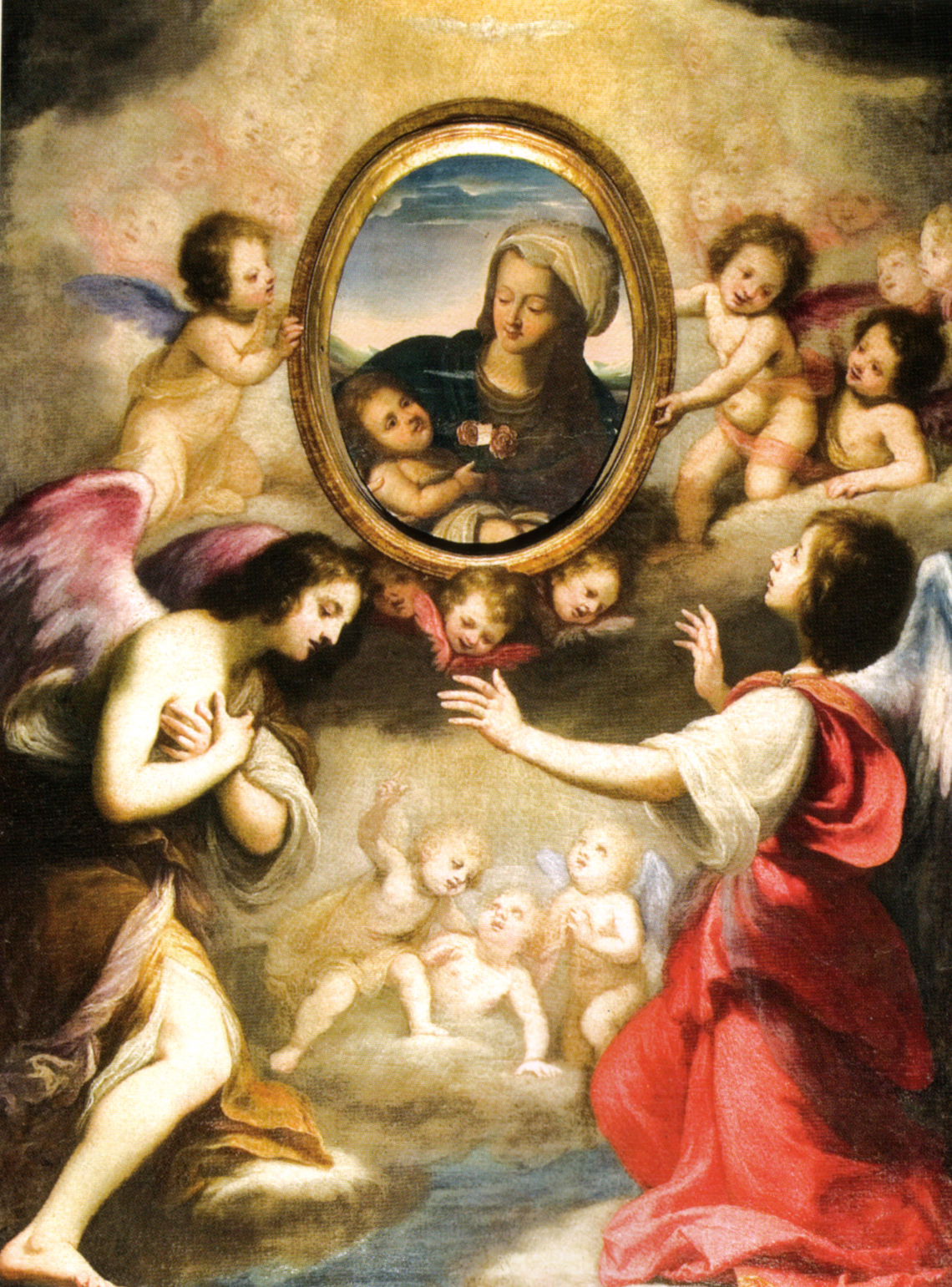
Francesco Boschi, Adoration of Angels, Church of Santi Michele e Gaetano, Florence

Francesco Boschi (1619–1675) was an Italian painter of the Baroque period, active mainly in Florence. He was the pupil of his father, Fabrizio Boschi as well as his uncle, the painter Matteo Rosselli. Born in Florence. He was noted for portraits. He painted the portrait of Galileo now in the Louvre.
