= Fabrizio Boschi =

Italian painter (1572–1642)

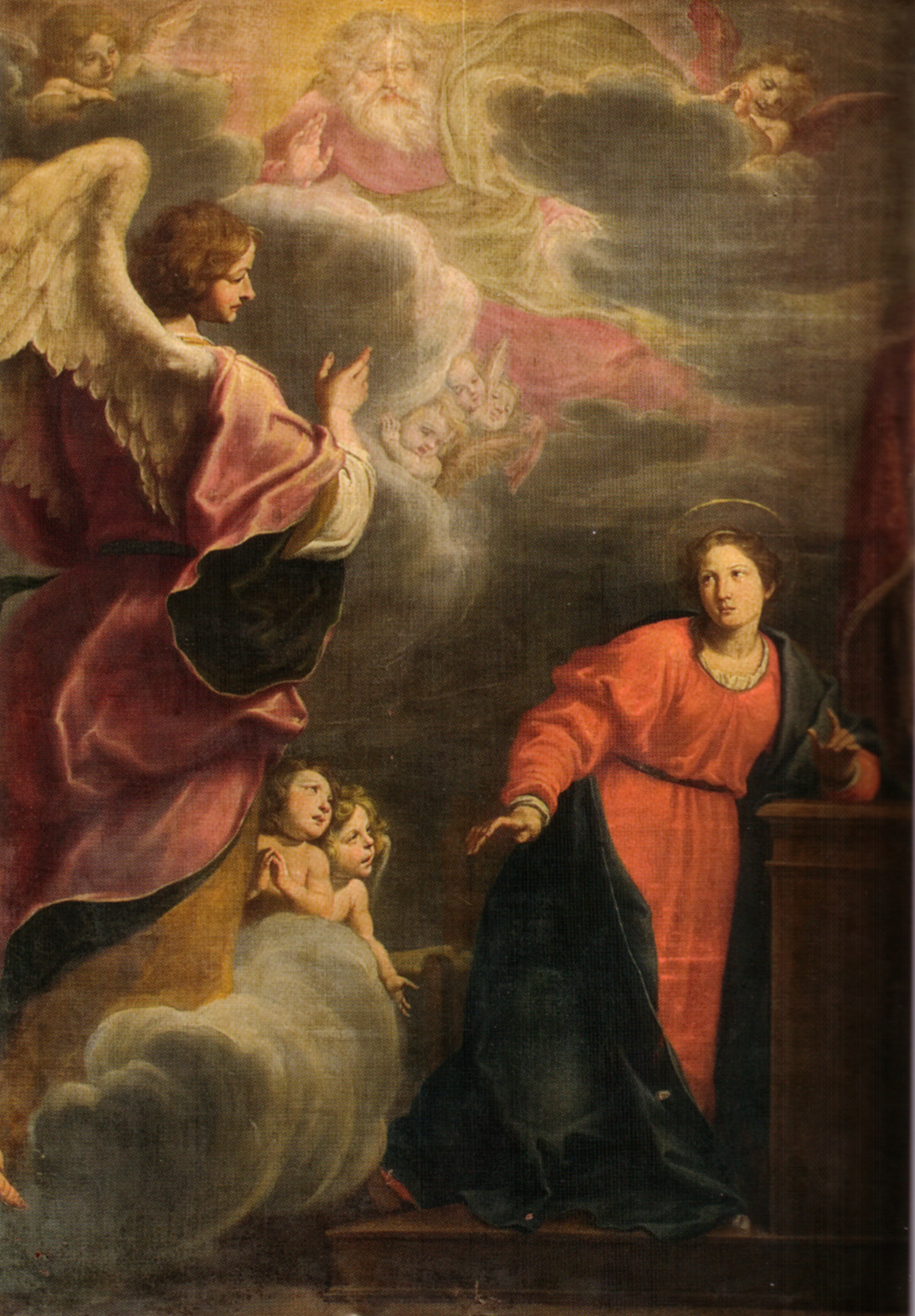
Fabrizio Boschi, Annunciation, San Gaetano, Florence

Fabrizio Boschi (1572–1642) was an Italian painter of the early-Baroque period, active in Florence.

He is said to have been a pupil of Domenico Passignano. In 1615, Michelangelo Buonarroti the Younger asked Boschi to paint Michelangelo presenting the wooden model of the Tribunal of the Wheel in Via Giulia in Rome to Pope Julius III on one of the walls of the Gallery of the Casa Buonarroti. He was one of the artists whose biography was recorded by Filippo Baldinucci, who noted both Boschi's fiery temper as well as his “persistent imagination”.

He also painted St. Bonaventure celebrating mass for the church of Ognissanti in Florence. He painted the Martyrdom of Saints Peter and Paul for the Certosa di Galuzzo. For the church of the Dominican convent of Santa Lucia dè Magnoli, he painted an Assumption of the Virgin surrounded with Angels, and Apostles below.

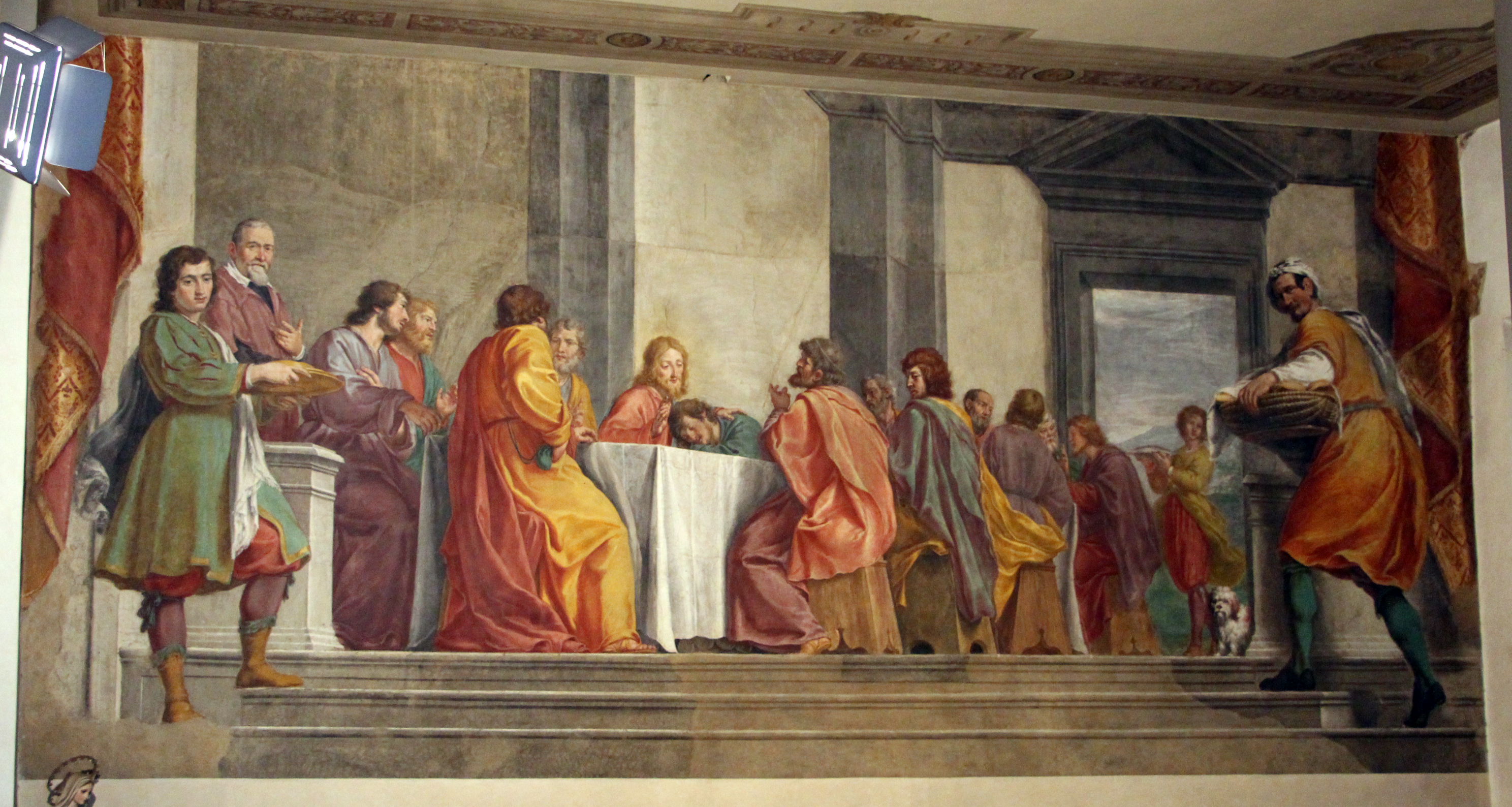
Last Supper in chapel of the Ospedale San Bonifacio, Florence

.
