= Alfonso Boschi =

Italian painter (1615–1649)

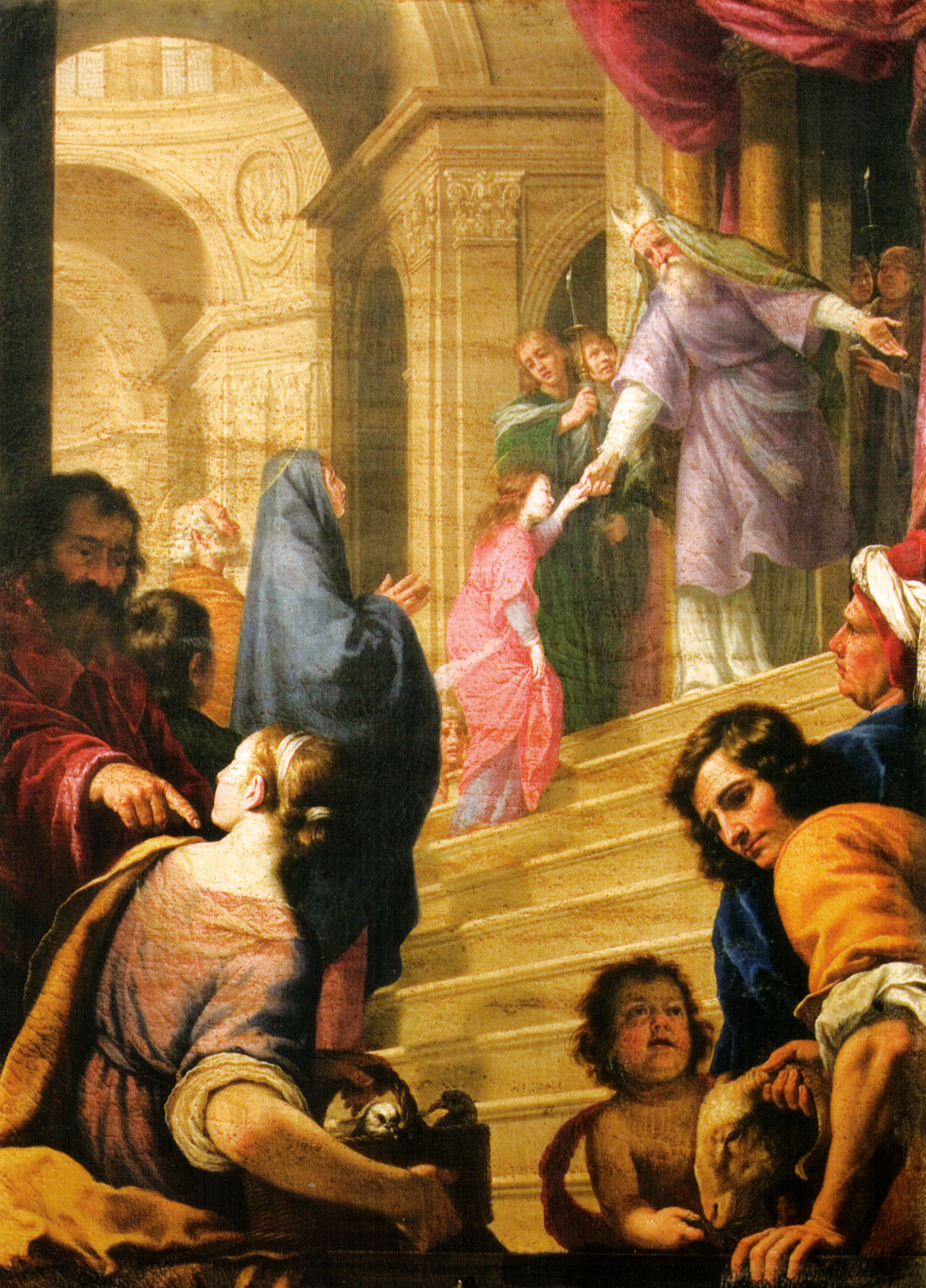
Alfonso Boschi, Presentation of Mary to the Temple, La chiesa dei Santi Michele e Gaetano

Alfonso Boschi (1615 – 1649) was an Italian painter of the Baroque period, active mainly in Florence. He was a pupil of his brother Francesco Boschi.
