= Antonio Magliabechi =

Italian librarian, scholar and bibliophile

Reverend Antonio Magliabechi
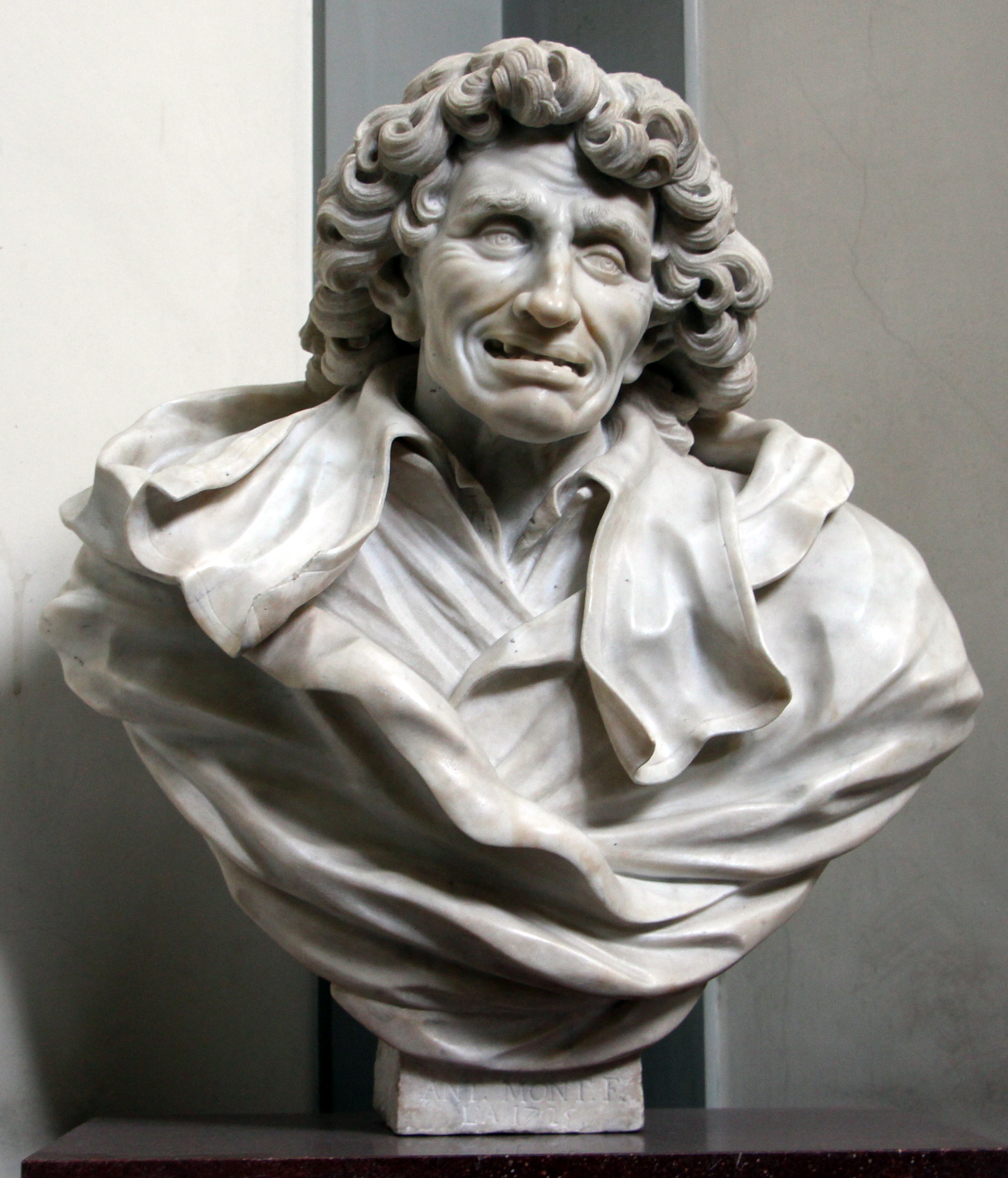
- Portrait bust of Antonio Magliabechi, by Antonio Montauti (Biblioteca Nazionale in Florence)
- Born: October 28, 1633; Florence, Grand Duchy of Tuscany
- Died: 4 July 1714 (aged 80); Florence, Grand Duchy of Tuscany
- Resting place: Santa Maria Novella
- Occupations: Librarian; Scholar; Bibliophile
- Parent(s): Marco Magliabechi and Ginevra Magliabechi (née Baldoriotti)

Antonio di Marco Magliabechi (or Magliabecchi; 29 October 1633 – 4 July 1714) was an Italian librarian, scholar and bibliophile.

== Biography ==
He was born at Florence, the son of a burgher named Marco Magliabechi, and Ginevra Baldorietta. His father died when Antonio was a young man, and he worked briefly in the studio of Matteo Roselli, but was apprenticed to a goldsmith in Ponto Vecchio. There he worked in this capacity until his fortieth year, until Michele Ermini, librarian to Cardinal de' Medici, recognized his academic ability and taught him Latin, Greek, and Hebrew.

In 1673 he became librarian to Cosimo III de' Medici, Grand Duke of Tuscany. Magliabechi became the central figure of literary life in Florence, and scholars of every nation sought his acquaintance and corresponded with him. Whilst this eminent post gave him considerable prominence, he is remembered more for his personal characteristics and his vast store of self-acquired learning. He was nicknamed the Enciclopedic, the animated Library, a literary glutton (Divoratore di Libri), and the most rational of bibliomaniacs, inasmuch as he read everything he bought. His own library consisted of 40,000 books and 10,000 manuscripts. His house literally overflowed with books; the stairways were lined with them, and they even filled the front porch. Many stories are told of his marvellous memory.

Magliabecchi died at the age of 81, in 1714, at the monastery of Sta. Maria Novella. He left his books to the Grand Duke to be used as a public library; his fortune went to the poor. His library, known as the "Magliabechiana", was combined with the grand-ducal private library by Victor Emmanuel II of Italy in 1861, the two forming the core of the Biblioteca Nazionale Centrale Firenze.

== Eccentricities ==
Magliabechi was known as an eccentric. He was a man of a most forbidding and savage aspect, and exceedingly negligent of his person. He refused to be waited upon. His diet was commonly three hard-boiled eggs, with a draught of water. He is said never in his life to have gone farther from Florence than to Prato, whither he once accompanied Cardinal Henry Noris, librarian at the Vatican, to see a manuscript.
