= San Gaetano, Florence =

Baroque church in Florence, Italy

Coordinates: 43°46′20.84″N 11°15′6.45″E

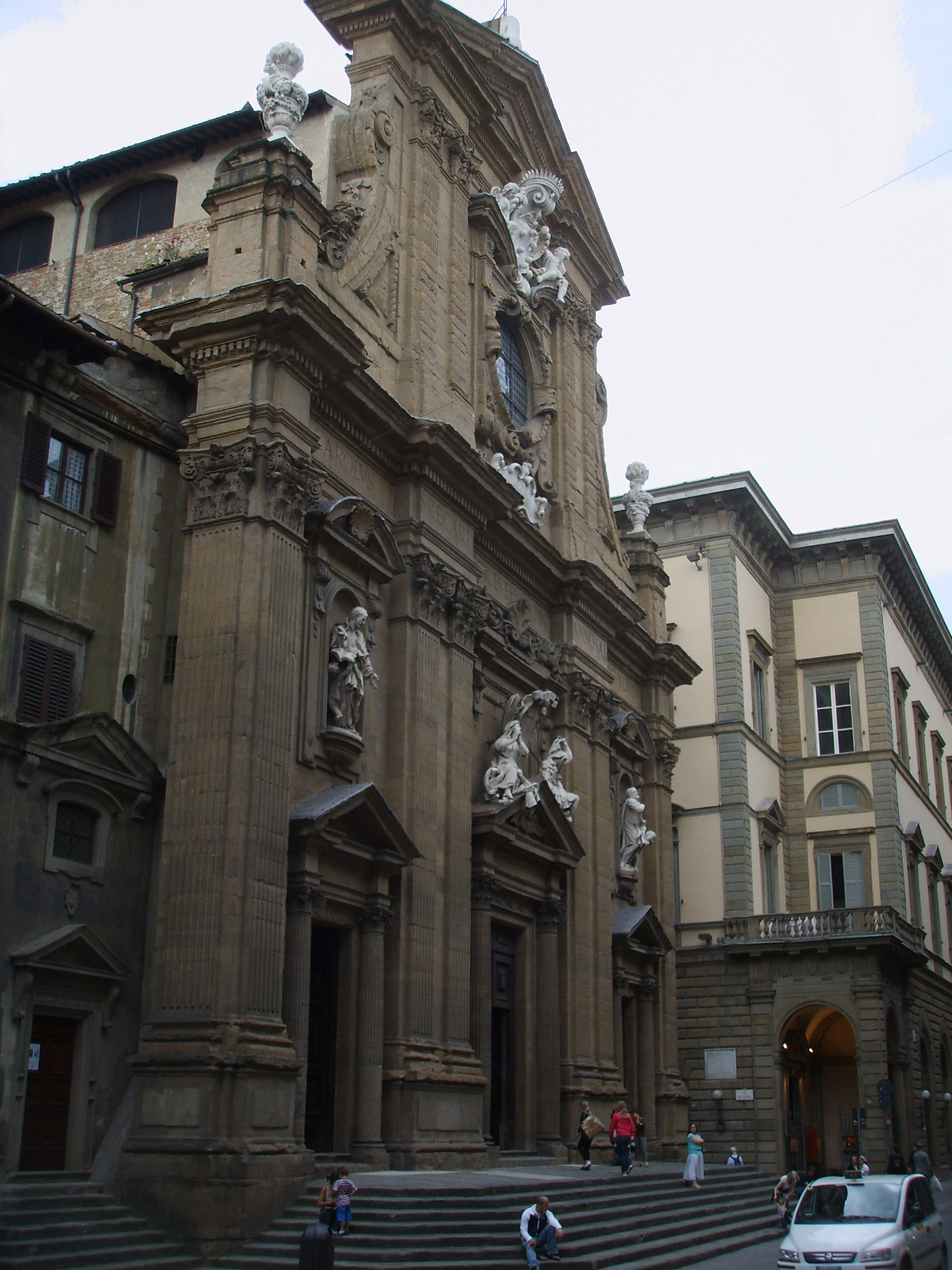
Façade

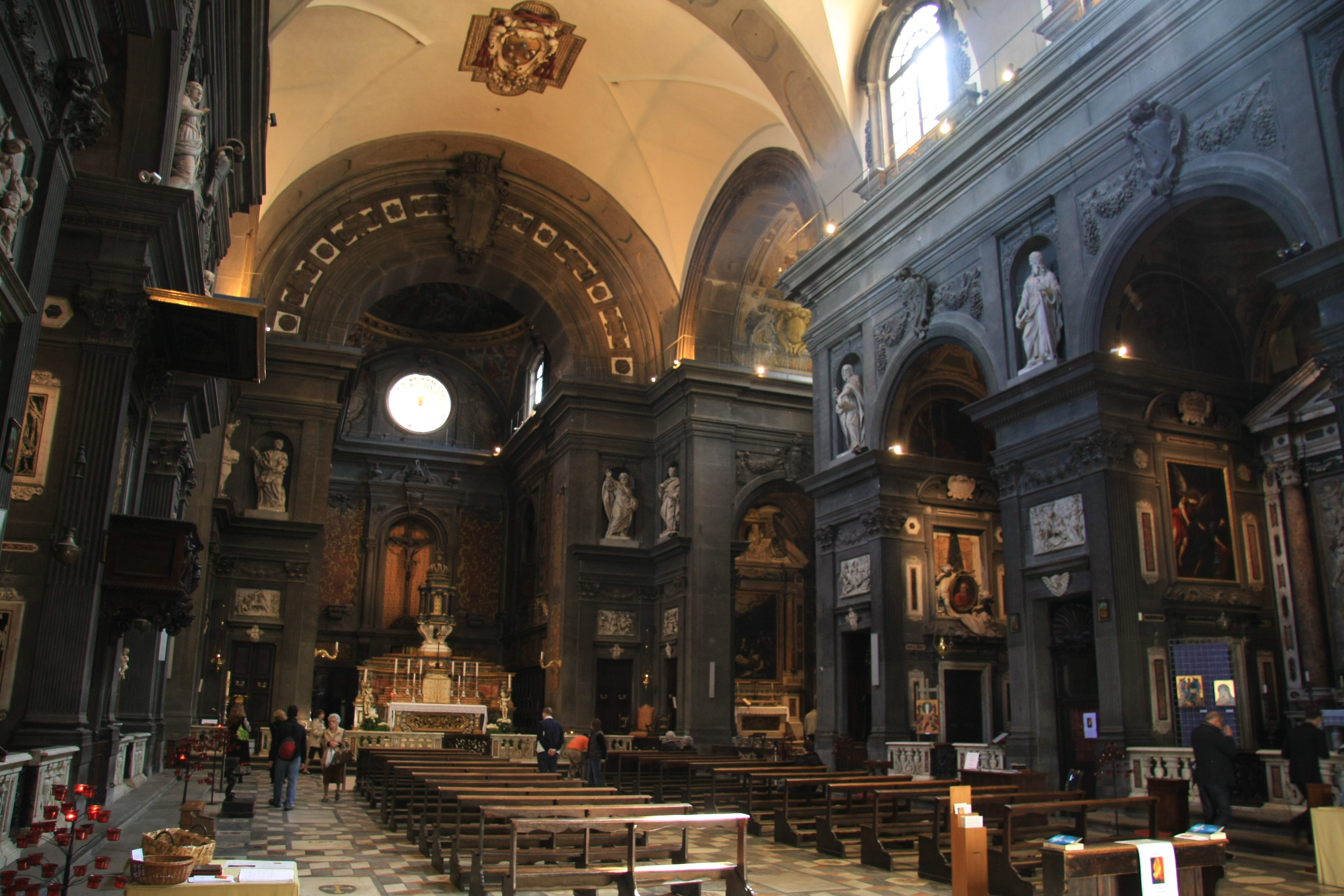
Interior

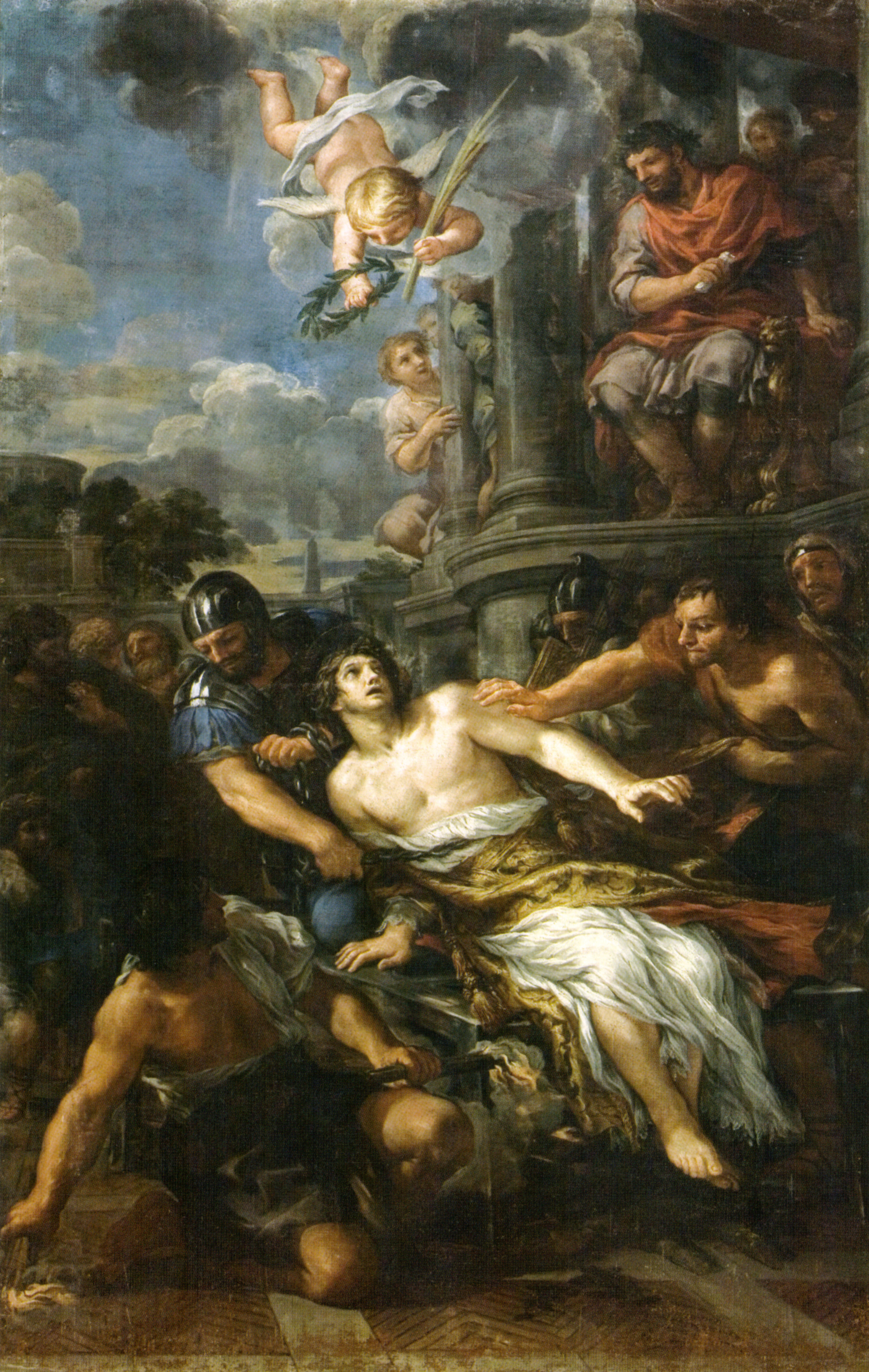
The Martyrdom of Saint Lawrence by Pietro da Cortona

San Gaetano, also known as Santi Michele e Gaetano, is a Baroque church in Florence, Italy, located on the Piazza Antinori, entrusted to the Institute of Christ the King Sovereign Priest.

== History ==
A Romanesque church, dedicated solely to Saint Michael the Archangel, had been located at the site for centuries prior to its Baroque reconstruction. Patronized by the Theatine order, the new church was dedicated to Saint Cajetan, one of the founders of the order, though the church could not formally be named after him until his canonisation in 1671. Funding for this reconstruction was obtained from the noble families of Florence, including the Medici. Cardinal Carlo de' Medici was particularly concerned with the work, and his name is inscribed on the façade. Building took place between 1604 and 1648. The original designs were by Bernardo Buontalenti, but a number of architects had a hand in building the church, each of whom changed the design. The most important architects were Matteo Nigetti and Gherardo Silvani.

In 2008, the church was entrusted to the Institute of Christ the King Sovereign Priest, a traditional institute of clerical life which exclusively offers Mass in Latin according to the pre–Vatican II Roman Rite, and has been the site of ordinations for the order since.

== Exterior ==
The façade, with its sculptural decorations, is atypical for Florentine churches, which had a predilection for geometrically ornamented façades. It has three portals: the central portal has a triangular tympanum surmounted by reclining marble statues representing Faith and Charity, sculpted by the Flemish Baldassarre Delmosel. In the center above the door is the heraldic shield of the Theatine order; higher above is the shield of Cardinal Giovanni Carlo de' Medici, a prominent patron. Above the side doors are a statue of Saint Cajetan (right, by Delmosel) and Saint Andrew Avellino (left, by Francesco Andreozzi).

== Interior ==
The interior is richly decorated, as is customary in Baroque churches. The counterfaçade has an organ by Benedetto Tronci of Pistoia. The marble holy water fonts at the entrance were sculpted in the form of shells supported by angels by Domenico Pieratti. Along the cornice are 14 statues depicting apostles and evangelists, sculpted by Novelli, Caccini, Baratta, Foggini, Piamontini, Pettirossi, Fortini, and Cateni. With each of these statues is a bas-relief depicting an event in the life of each saint.

The first chapel on the right houses a Martyrdom of Saint Andrew by Antonio Ruggeri; the ceiling was decorated by Ottavio Vannini, who painted in the spandrels an Ecce Homo and The Calling of Peter.

The second chapel on the right houses a Saint Michael Freeing the Souls in Purgatory by Vignali, who also painted the canvases on the wall depicting the life of Saint Peter. The ceiling was frescoed by Michele Colonna and Agostino Metello.

The third chapel on the right has an altarpiece depicting Saint Cajetan and Saint Andrea Avellino with the Trinity and Saint Francis of Assisi by Matteo Rosselli. A bust of Saint Francis on the altar was sculpted by Malatesti. The walls have portraits of Cardinal Francesco Martelli and the archbishop Giuseppe Maria Martelli, painted by Roman artists. In a small corridor entering at the crossing are two mausoleums, one with the ashes of Agostino Coltellini, famous jurist and writer, depicted in a canvas. The other is dedicated to Lorenzo Lorenzini, a pupil of Vincenzio Viviani.

On the right crossing is a canvas depicting the Adoration of the Magi by Ottaviano Vannini. Below is a mausoleum of the Bonsi family. In the ceiling is a fresco depicting the Theatine order by Filippo Galletti.

The fourth chapel on the right is dedicated to the Virgin. The Nativity altarpiece was painted by Matteo Rosselli. The walls are painted by Fabbrizio Boschi, depicting the Annunciation and Visitation. Atop the altar is a bronze crucifix by Giovanni Francesco Susini.

The fifth chapel houses the main altar with a silver ciborium made by Benedetto Petrucci, and donated by the Torrigiani family.

Near the choir is a large stone tabernacle with a bronze crucifix by Francesco Susini, patronized by Prince Lorenzo de' Medici, son of Ferdinando I. The cupola is frescoed by Pietro Galletti.

The sixth chapel houses an oil painting on canvas depicting the Invention of the Cross painted by Matteo Rosselli. Two other paintings and the frescoes are by Bilibert and by Vignali.

At the end of the crossing is a canvas by Giovanni Bilibert, depicting the Exaltation of the Cross standing above the mausoleum of Cardinal Giovanni Bonsi.

The seventh chapel houses a Saint Andrea Avellino Struck with Apoplexy at the Altar by Ignazio Hugford. The wall frescoes depict the Presentation at the Temple by Francesco and Alfonso Boschi. The ceiling was decorated by Lorenzo Lippi.

In the eighth chapel (second chapel on the left) is the Cappella Franceschi, the chapel of the Franceschi noble family of bankers and traders. The main altarpiece is a masterwork of Pietro da Cortona, depicting The Martyrdom of Saint Lawrence. The ceiling was decorated by Colonna and Metelli. The side canvases depict the Riches of the Church Dispensed as Charity by Saint Lawrence by Matteo Rosselli and a Saint Francis by Jacopo da Empoli.

The ninth chapel has a canvas depicting the Adoration of the Immaculate Conception by Giacinto Fabbroni. The ceiling was frescoed by P. Galletti. The chapel serves as the mausoleum for Francesco and Marcellino Albergotti, both depicted in bas-reliefs.

=== Statues of Apostles and Evangelists ===
==== Left-hand side (from the altar to the counterfaçade) ====
No.	Image	Subject	Artist	Image	Bas-relief	Artist	Year
1		Saint Peter	Giovan Battista Foggini		The Martyrdom of Saint Peter	Giovan Battista Foggini	1683
2		Saint Jude Thaddeus	Giuseppe Piamontini		The Martyrdom of Saint Jude Thaddeus and Saint Simon	Giuseppe Piamontini	1698
3		Saint Matthias	Gioacchino Fortini		The Martyrdom of Saint Matthias	Gioacchino Fortini	1696
4		Saint John the Evangelist	Antonio Novelli		(pulpit)		1640
5		Saint Matthew the Evangelist	Antonio Novelli		The Martyrdom of Saint Matthew the Evangelist	Circle of Foggini	1640
6		Saint Bartholomew	Giovan Camillo Cateni		The Martyrdom of Saint Bartholomew	Giuseppe Piamontini	1698
7		Saint Luke the Evangelist	Giovan Camillo Cateni		Saint Luke Painting the Virgin and Child; The Sermon of Saint Luke	Giovan Camillo Cateni	1693

==== Right-hand side (from the altar to the counterfaçade) ====
No.	Image	Subject	Artist	Image	Bas-relief	Artist	Year
1		Saint Paul	Giovan Battista Foggini		The Martyrdom of Saint Paul	Giovan Battista Foggini	1683
2		Saint Thomas	Giovanni Baratta		The Martyrdom of Saint Thomas	Florentine school	1700
3		Saint Philip	Bartolomeo Cennini		The Martyrdom of Saint Philip	Tuscan school	1658
4		Saint James the Less	Lodovico Salvetti		The Martyrdom of Saint James the Less	Tuscan school	1658
5		Saint Andrew	Antonio Novelli		The Martyrdom of Saint Andrew (1774)	Giovan Battista Capezzoli	1640
6		Saint Simon	Antonio Novelli		The Martyrdom of Saint Simon	Antonio Novelli	1640
7		Saint Mark the Evangelist	Giuseppe Piamontini		The Sermon of Saint Mark the Evangelist; The Martyrdom of Saint Mark the Evangelist	Giuseppe Piamontini	1693
