= Ottavio Vannini =

Italian painter

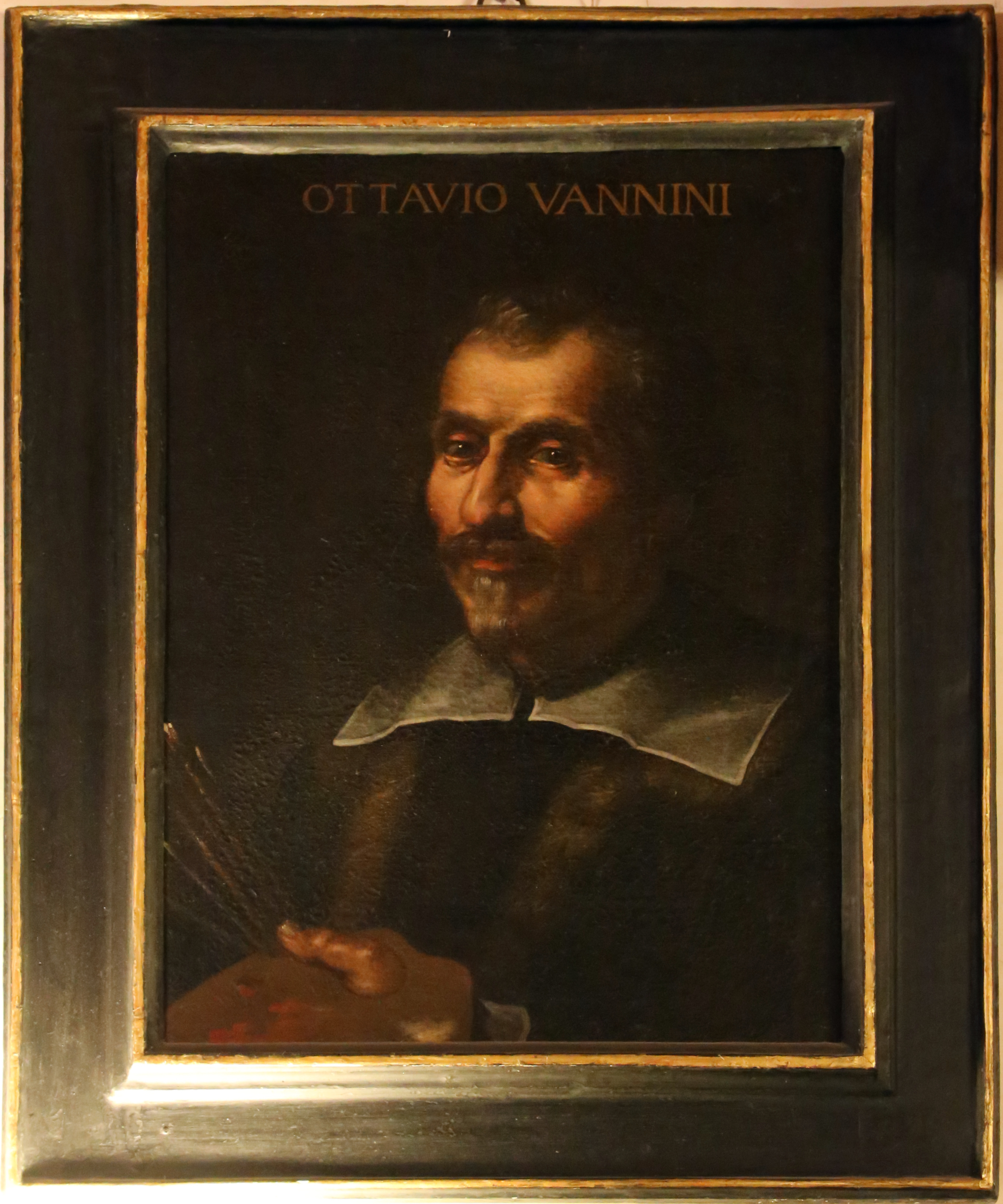
Ottavio Vannini

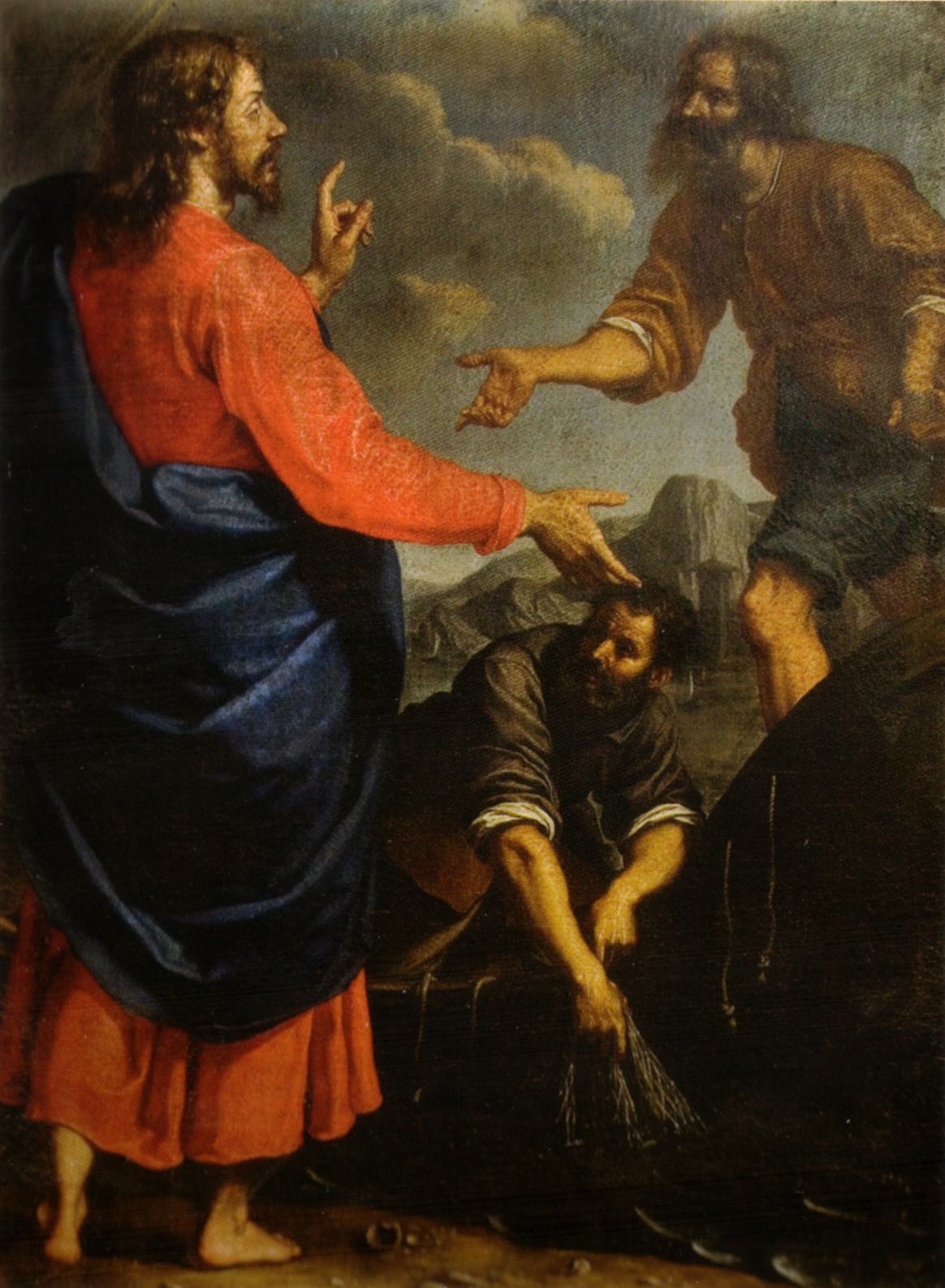
Ottavio Vannini, The Vocation of Saint Andrew and Saint Peter, San Gaetano, Florence

Ottavio Vannini (September 15, 1585 – c. 1643) was an Italian artist of the Baroque period, active mainly in Florence.

== Biography ==
Born in Florence to Michele Vannini. He initially apprenticed for four years with a mediocre painter by the name of Giovanni Battista Mercati (possibly the engraver), but he then trained in Rome under Anastasio Fuontebuoni. He returned to Florence to work with Domenico Passignani. He painted a St Vincent Ferrer for the church of San Marco, Florence; and an Adoration of the Magi for the church of the Carmine. He painted the altarpiece for the chapel of the Holy Sacrament in the cathedral of Colle Val d'Elsa. He painted a Tancred and Erminia and an Ecce Homo now in the Palazzo Pitti. He painted a Communion of St. Jerome for the church of Santa Anna.

In 2007, Vannini's 1640 work, The Triumph of David (on loan from the Haukohl Family Collection) hanging at the Milwaukee Art Museum's Early European Gallery was attacked by a person described as having a history of mental illness. It was reported he was disturbed by the image of Goliath's severed head.
