= Giuseppe Maria Martelli =

Catholic archbishop

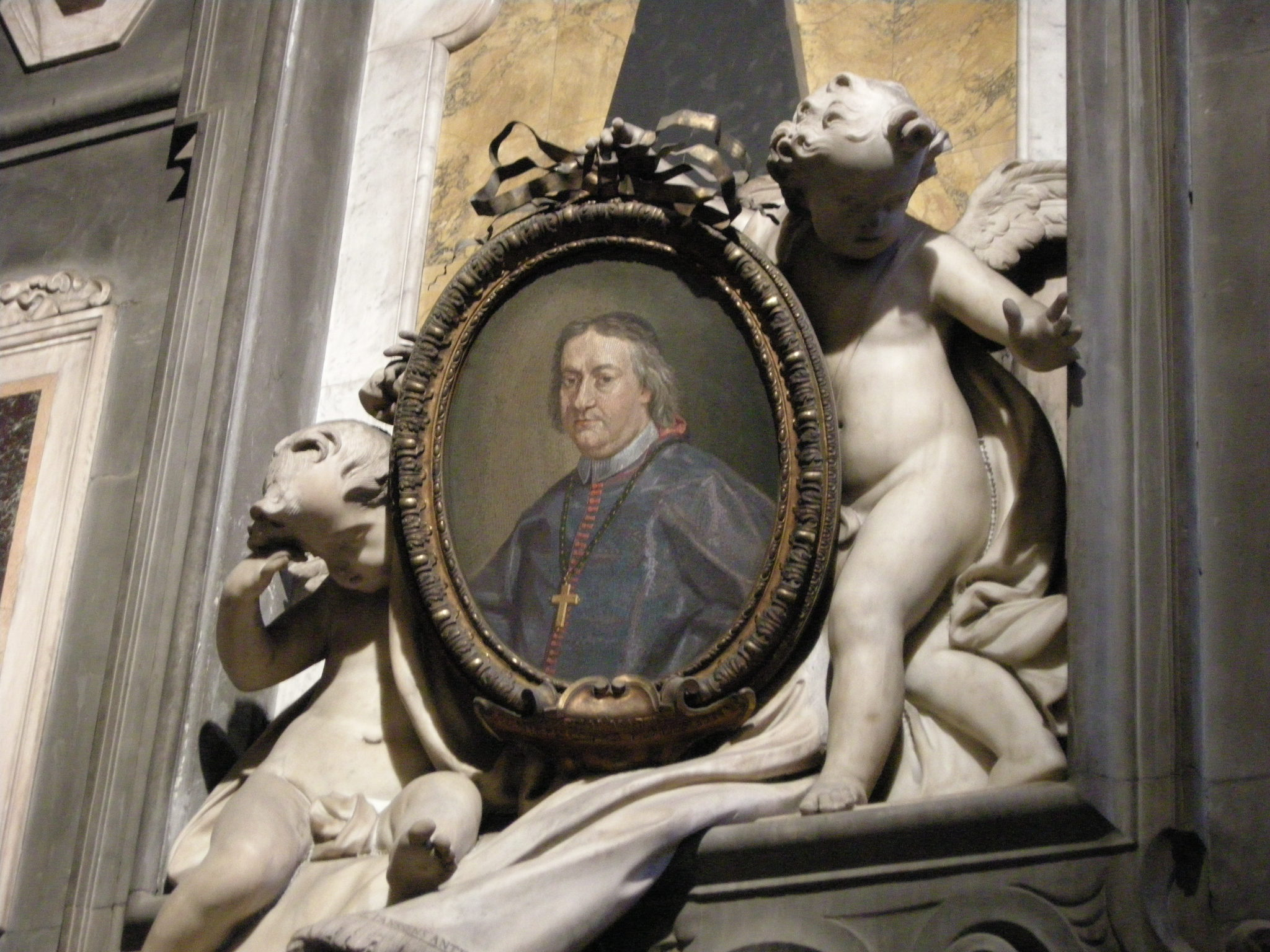
Portrait of Giuseppe Maria in the family chapel

Giuseppe Maria Martelli (1678 – 1741) was an Italian Roman Catholic archbishop of Florence from 1722 to 1740.

== Biography ==
He was born to the aristocratic Martelli family. He rose rapidly in ecclesiastical rank, becoming prior of San Lorenzo and synod examiner for the dioceses of Florence and Fiesolo. He supervised a synod of the diocese in 1732. In Florence, he helped refurbish the Palazzo Arcivescovile and the church of San Salvatore al Vescovo. He was buried in the church of San Michele e Gaetano.
