= Filippo Buonarroti =

Florentine antiquarian

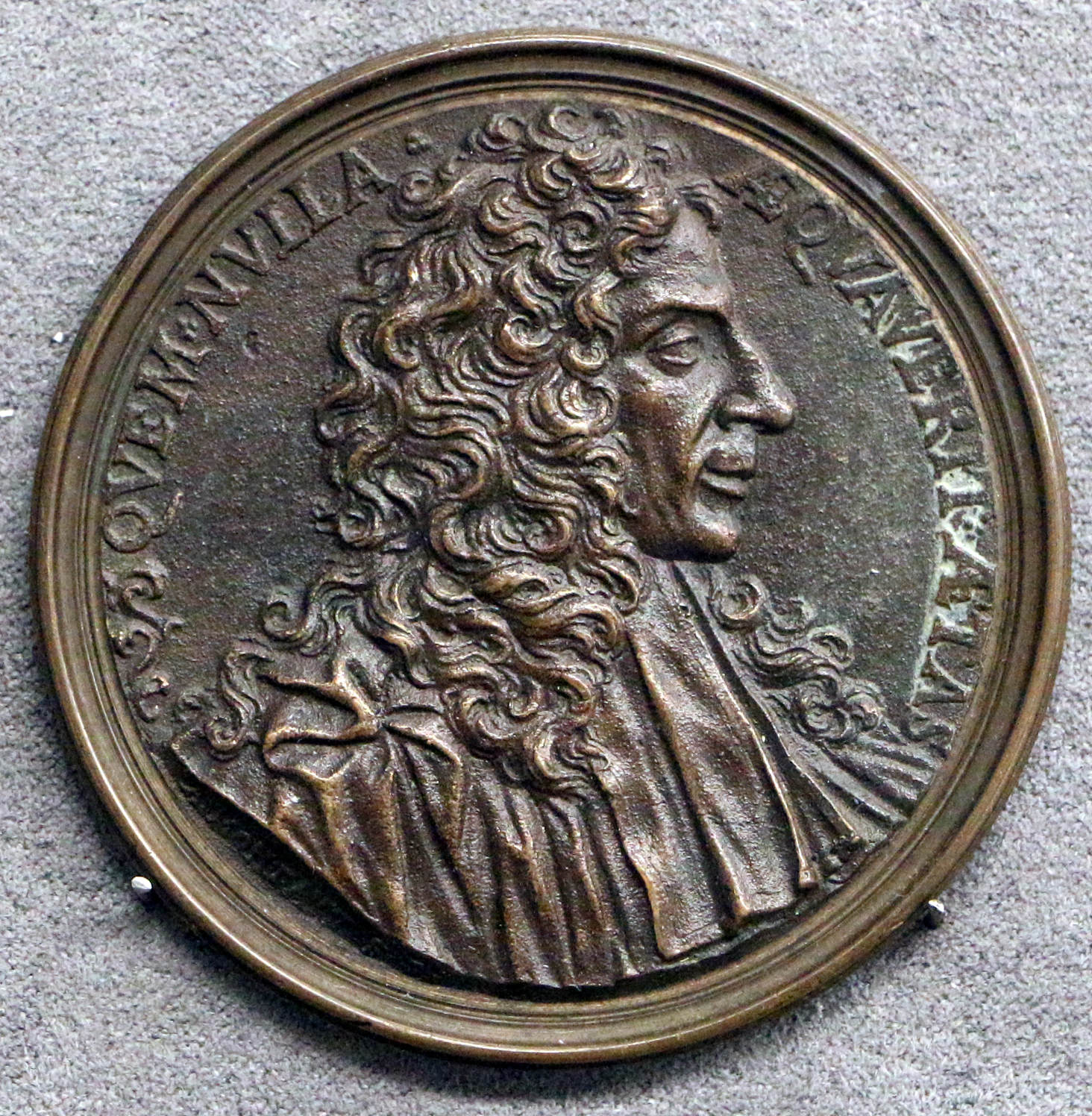
- Antonio Montauti, Medal of Filippo Buonarroti
- Born: 18 November 1661; Florence, Grand Duchy of Tuscany
- Died: 10 December 1733; Florence, Grand Duchy of Tuscany
- Occupations: Antiquarian, numismatist, archaeologist
- Parent(s): Leonardo Buonarroti and Ginevra Buonarroti (née Martellini)

Filippo Buonarroti (18 November 1661 in Florence – 10 December 1733 in Florence), the great-grandnephew of Michelangelo Buonarroti, was an Italian official at the court of Cosimo III, Grand Duke of Tuscany and an antiquarian, whose Etruscan studies, among the earliest in that field, inspired Antonio Francesco Gori. The Etruscan art and antiquities in the family palazzo-museum of Florence, Casa Buonarroti, are his contribution to the artistic-intellectual memorial to the Buonarroti.

== Biography ==
Filippo Buonarroti pursued studies in law and exercised an early scientific curiosity.

His early iconographic study of Imperial bronze coins and medals of Roman emperors in the collection of Cardinal Gasparo di Carpegna, which he dedicated to Cosimo III, made his reputation as a scholar; it was published as Osservazioni Istoriche sopra alcuni medaglioni antichi all'Altezza Serenissima di Cosimo III Granduca di Toscana (Rome 1698) and contained thirty full-page engraved plates by Francesco Andreoni, all but one of coins. The books had its origins in Buonarroti's years 1684 to 1699 in Rome in the familia of Cardinal Carpegna, whom he served as secretary, conservator of collections and librarian. In 1699 Cosimo III recalled him to Tuscany and employed him as Auditore delle Riformagioni, as minister of the Pratica of Pistoia, secretary of the Florentine Pratica and as a participant in a newly organised committee for jurisdictional affairs. In 1700 he was made a senator, a purely honorary role in the Medici Grand Duchy.

He is remembered most for his pioneering study of gold glass vessel bottoms used as grave-makers in the Catacombs of Rome, Osservazioni sopra alcuni frammenti di vasi antichi di vetro ornate di figure trovati nei cimiteri di Roma (1716), in which he made the extraordinary, almost proto-Romantic assertion that the aesthetic crudity of early Christian art, often remarked by connoisseurs of Roman arts, had served to intensify the piety of the worshipper, an early expression of feeling for primitive art.

He updated and edited Thomas Dempster's De Etruria Regali Libri Septem (in eight volumes, 1723), a classic study of Etruscan art that had been written a century earlier by the Scottish scholar who was based in Pisa. Buonarroti provided some of the engraved illustrations and in 1724 he published a commentary on the work.

== Main works ==
Osservazioni istoriche sopra alcuni medaglioni antichi, Rome: Ercole, 1698.

- Buonarroti, Filippo (1698). Osservazioni Istoriche sopra alcuni medaglioni antichi all'Altezza Serenissima di Cosimo III Granduca di Toscana. Rome: Domenico Antonio Ercole.
- Buonarroti, Filippo (1716). Osservazioni sopra alcuni frammenti di vasi antichi di vetro ornati di figure trovati ne' cimiteri di Roma. Florence: Jacopo Guiducci, e Santi Franchi.
- Ad monumenta etrusca operi Dempsteriano addita Explicationes et Conjecturae, published at the end of the second volume of Buonarroti's edition of Dempster's De Etruria Regali, Florence, 8 vols, 1723.
