= Giuseppe Piamontini =

Italian sculptor

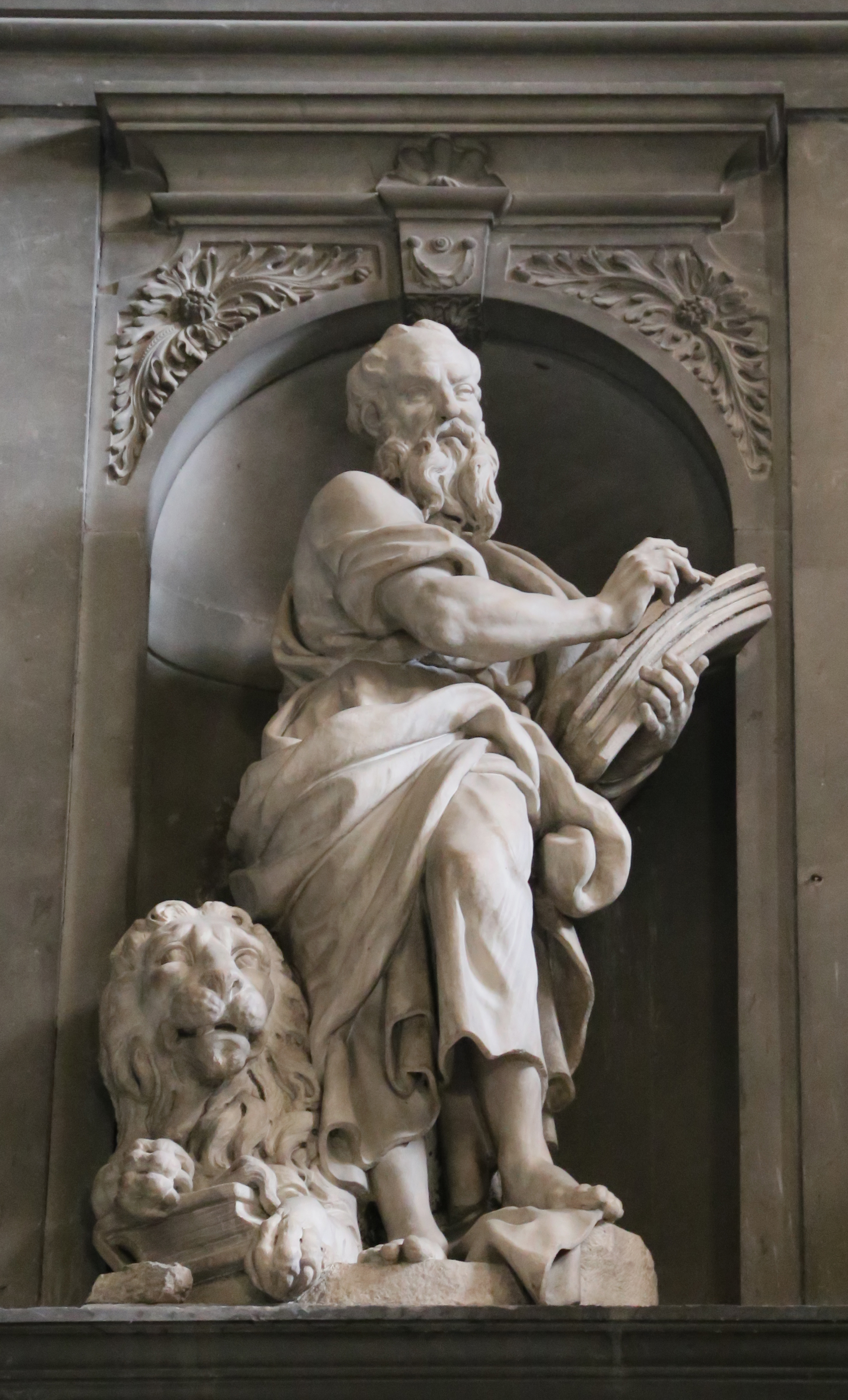
- St. Mark the Apostle, San Gaetano, Florence
- Born: 3 January 1664; Florence, Grand Duchy of Tuscany
- Died: 13 February 1744 (aged 80); Florence, Grand Duchy of Tuscany
- Known for: Sculpture
- Movement: Baroque

Giuseppe Piamontini (3 January 1664 – 13 February 1744) was an Italian Baroque sculptor, born and active in Florence.

== Biography ==
=== Early lide and education ===
Giuseppe Piamontini was born in Florence on 3 January 1664. He initially trained with Giovanni Battista Foggini, but then spent five years working with Ercole Ferrata in Rome. It has been suggested that the bronze statuette of Jupiter (Philadelphia Museum of Art; and Oxford, Ashmolean Museum), which shows the influence of Alessandro Algardi, may have been executed as a studio exercise during Piamontini’s student years in Rome. (A statuette of Juno, in the same collection, which is dated stylistically to the 1690s, was later paired with the Jupiter).

=== Early career ===
After 1686 Piamontini returned to Florence, where he shared a studio with Cateni, and began work on the small alabaster Dead Christ for the Palazzo Pitti and the life-size marble St. John the Baptist for the Baptistery. His main activity, however, was in collaboration with Foggini and others: in the Feroni Chapel, Santissima Annunziata (1691–3), he carved two large marble figures of Fortuna Nautica and Pensiero. The first is a seated, draped female figure holding a cornucopia and a bronze medallion of a boat. The Pensiero is a vigorous, bearded nude figure resting his head on his left hand, with his right arm and right leg resting on a pile of books, peering out of the chapel in a grotesque fashion. It is an inventive and powerful image, which Piamontini adopted a few years later in his work, also under the direction of Foggini, in San Gaetano, Florence. Here he carved the marble statues of St. Mark and St. Jude with two reliefs under St. Mark, one under St. Jude and one under St. Bartholomew, a statue by Pietro Novelli.

=== Mature work ===
In 1702 Piamontini carved the marble statue of St. Bernard for the second cloister of San Frediano in Cestello, Florence. Comparison with the contorted figure of a demon below St. Bernard suggests that the two bronze reliefs of the Massacre of the Innocents and the Fall of the Giants (both Museum of Fine Arts, Boston) were probably executed around the same time, although they were not exhibited at the Santissima Annunziata until 1724. The huge marble version of the latter in the Palazzo Spini Feroni in Florence is signed and dated 1705. The complexity of the composition and the emotional intensity of the expressions and gestures illustrate Piamontini’s originality and ingenuity, although some of the figures are anatomically awkward.

This combination of innovation and clumsiness is apparent again in another pair of bronzes, the Sacrifice of Isaac (1722; Florence, priv. col.) and St. Louis Bearing the Crown of Thorns (1723; Florence, Bargello), part of a series made for Anna Maria Luisa de' Medici, the Electress Palatine. Undeterred by the restrictions of a bronze group Piamontini shows the angel flying down to grab the knife from Abraham, but the finished effect remains too heavy to be credible. The group of St. Louis shows a greater attention to the detail of the draperies and to the narrative, even including an attendant carrying St. Louis’s boots.

Piamontini returned to large-scale statues with his marble figure of St. Luke of 1732 for the convent church at Mafra, Portugal and Jupiter for the triumphal arch (1739) of Grand Duke Francis II in the Piazza della Libertà, Florence. After Massimiliano Soldani Benzi and Giovanni Battista Foggini, Piamontini was one of the most accomplished sculptors to emerge from the academy of Cosimo III.

== Works ==
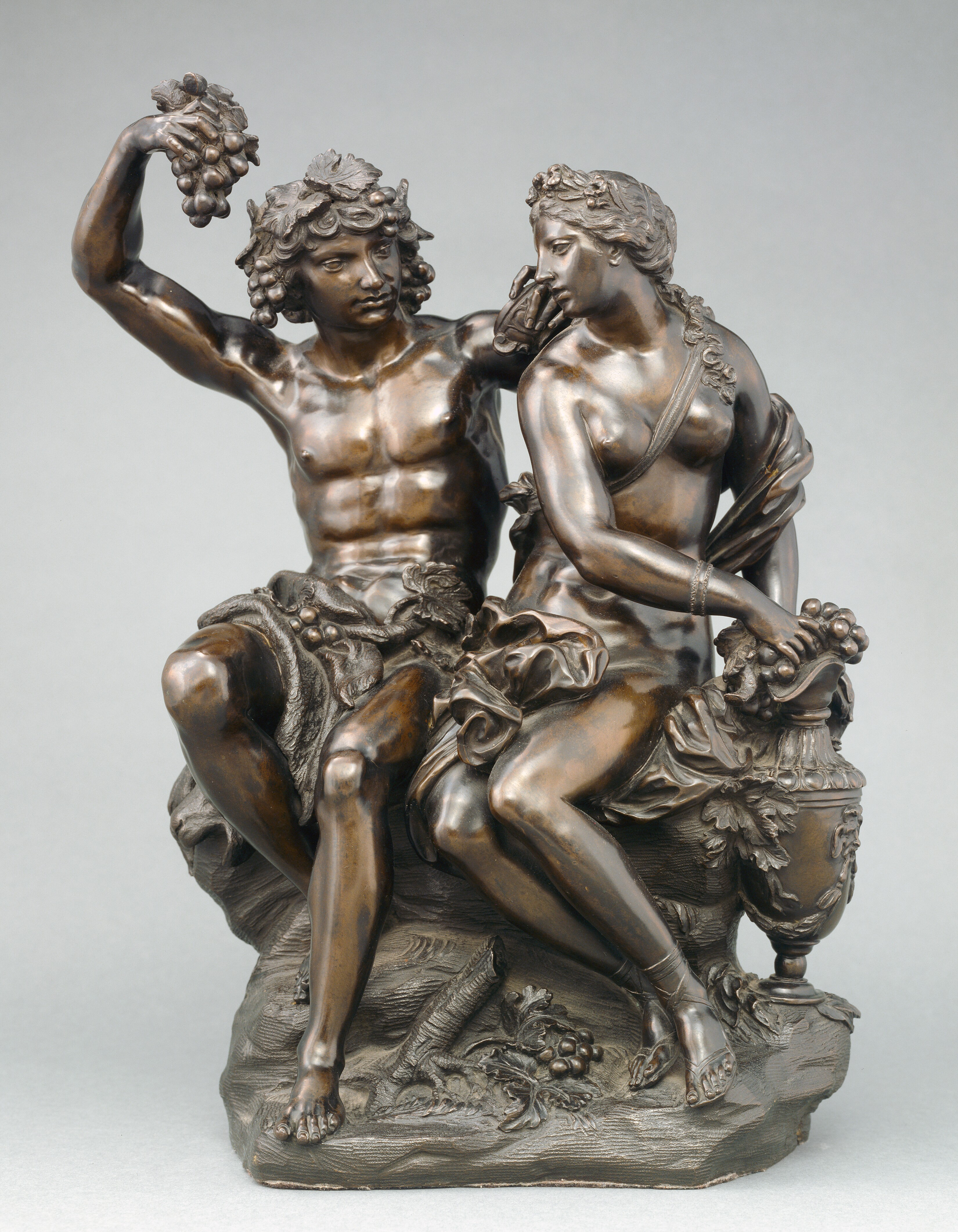
Bacchus and Ariadne, Getty Center

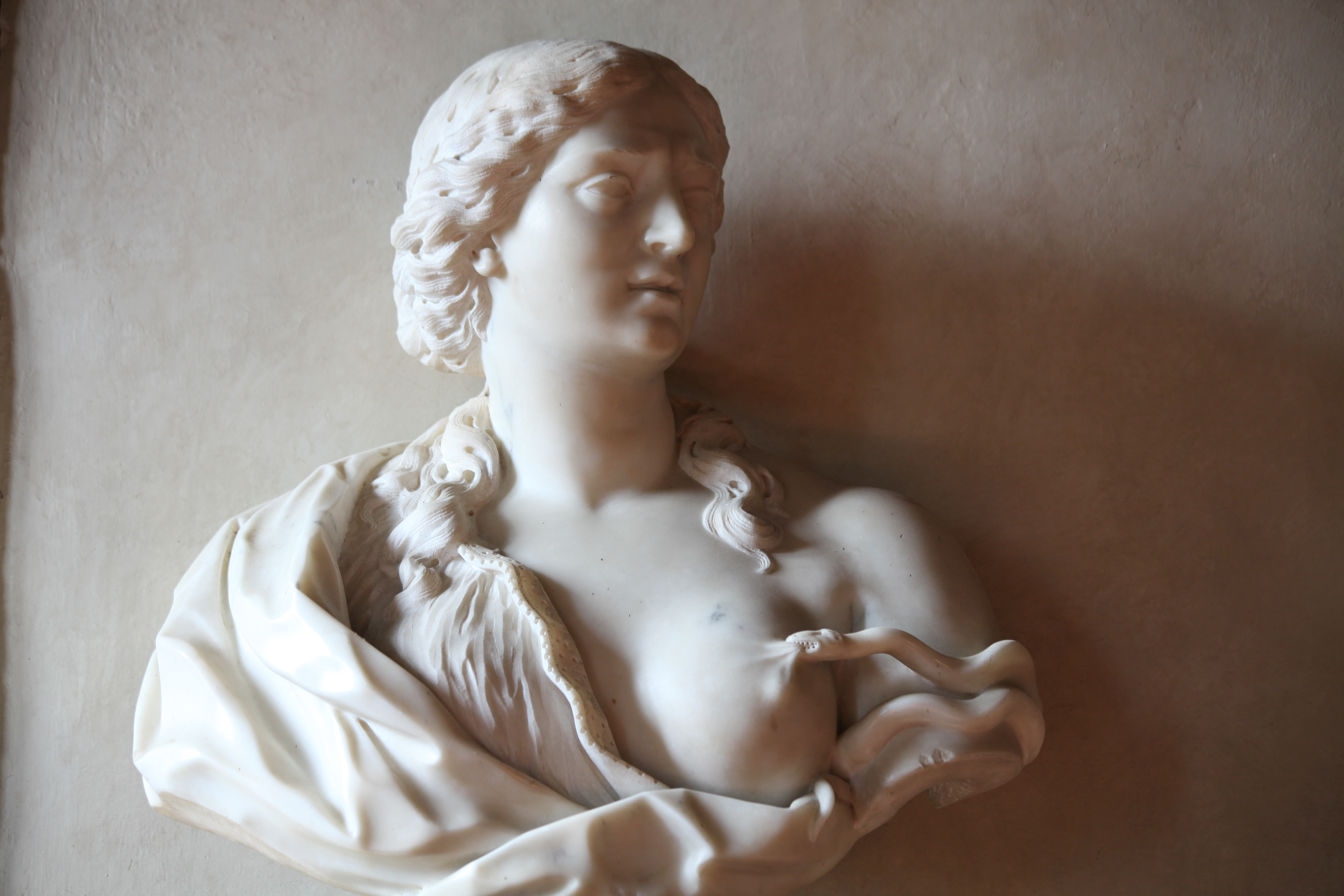
Cleopatra, Villa Medicea di Cerreto Guidi, Italy

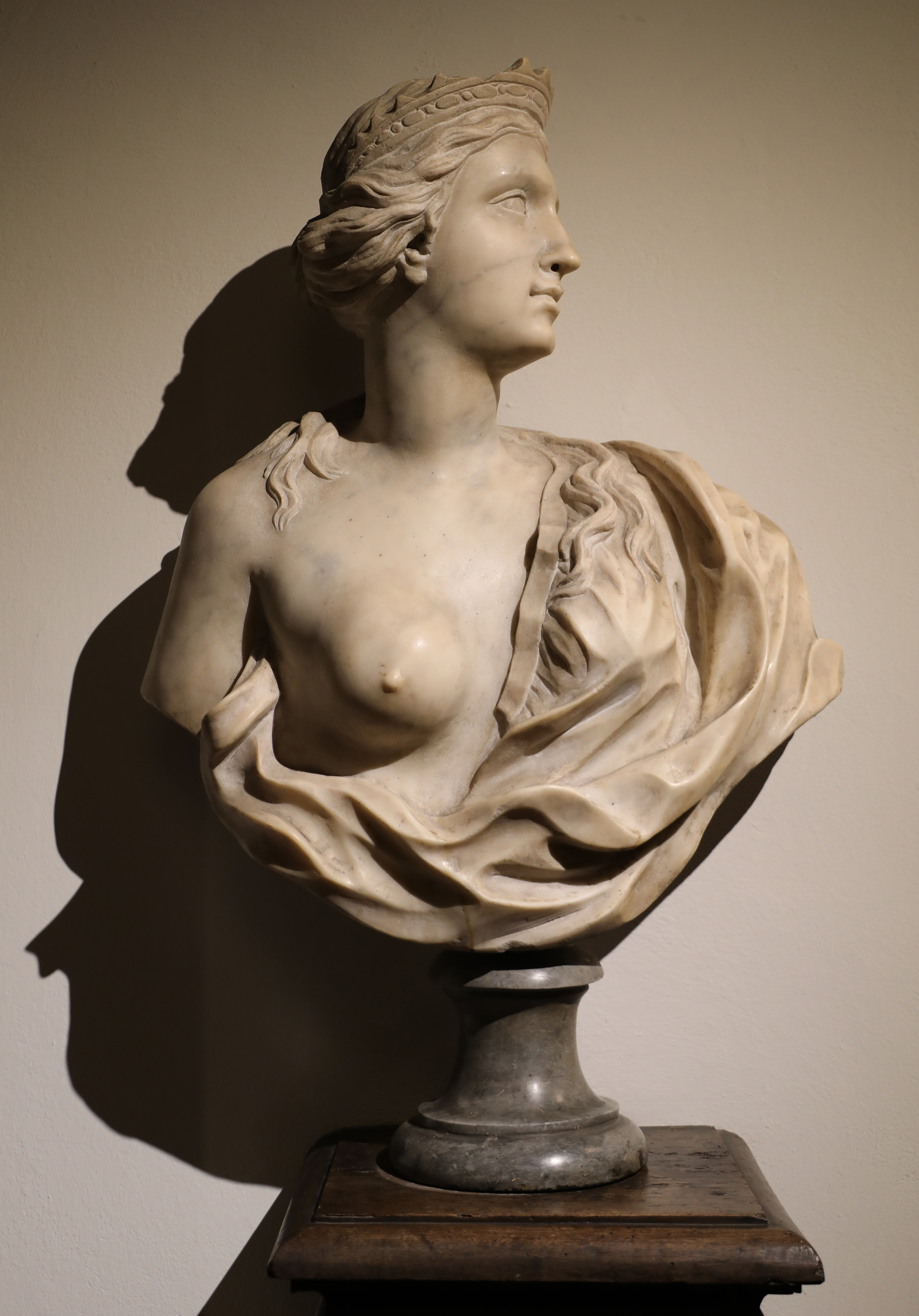
Bust of a woman, Palazzo Viviani della Robbia, Florence

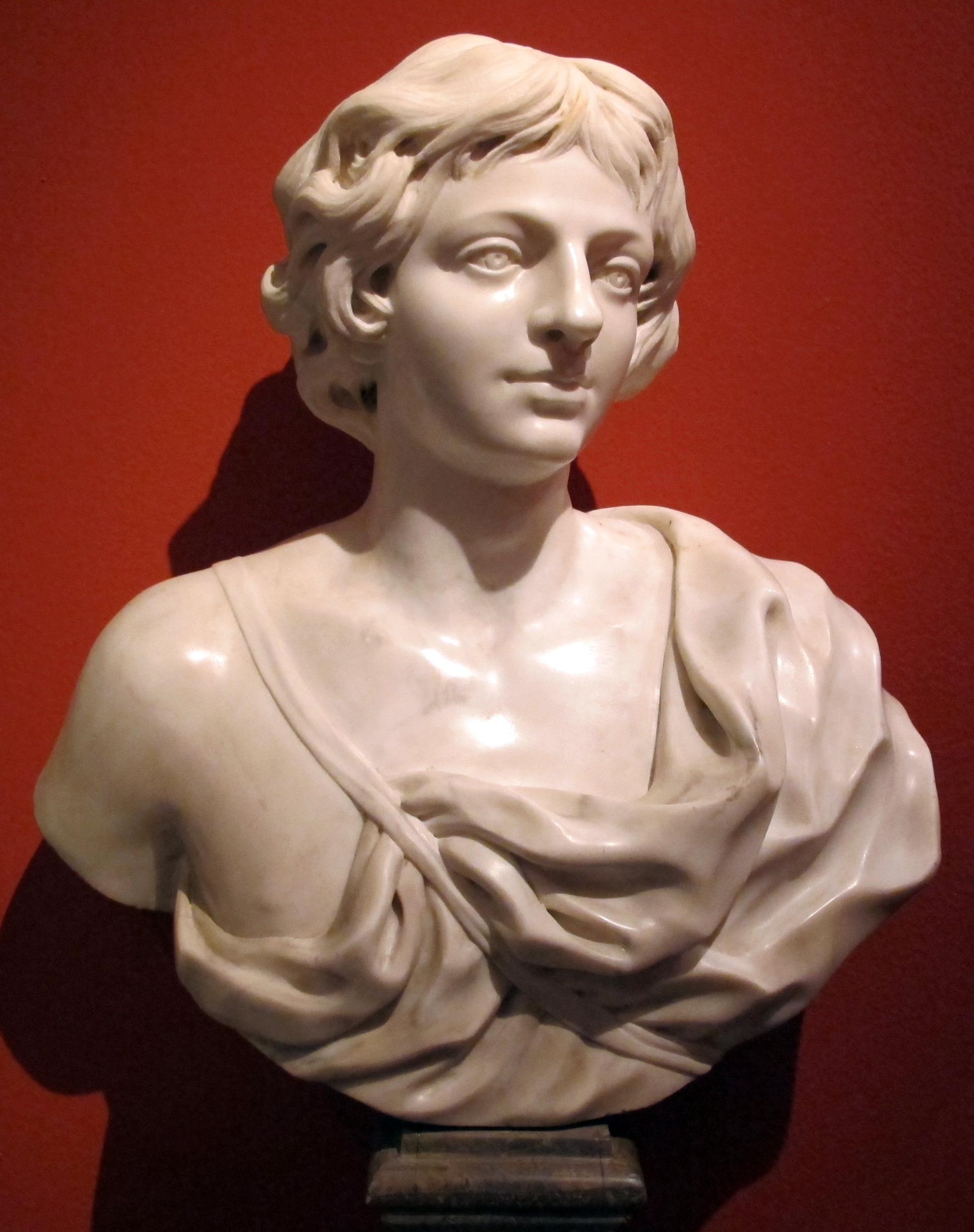
Adonis, priv. col.

Young Saint John and the Lamb, Cleveland Museum of Art

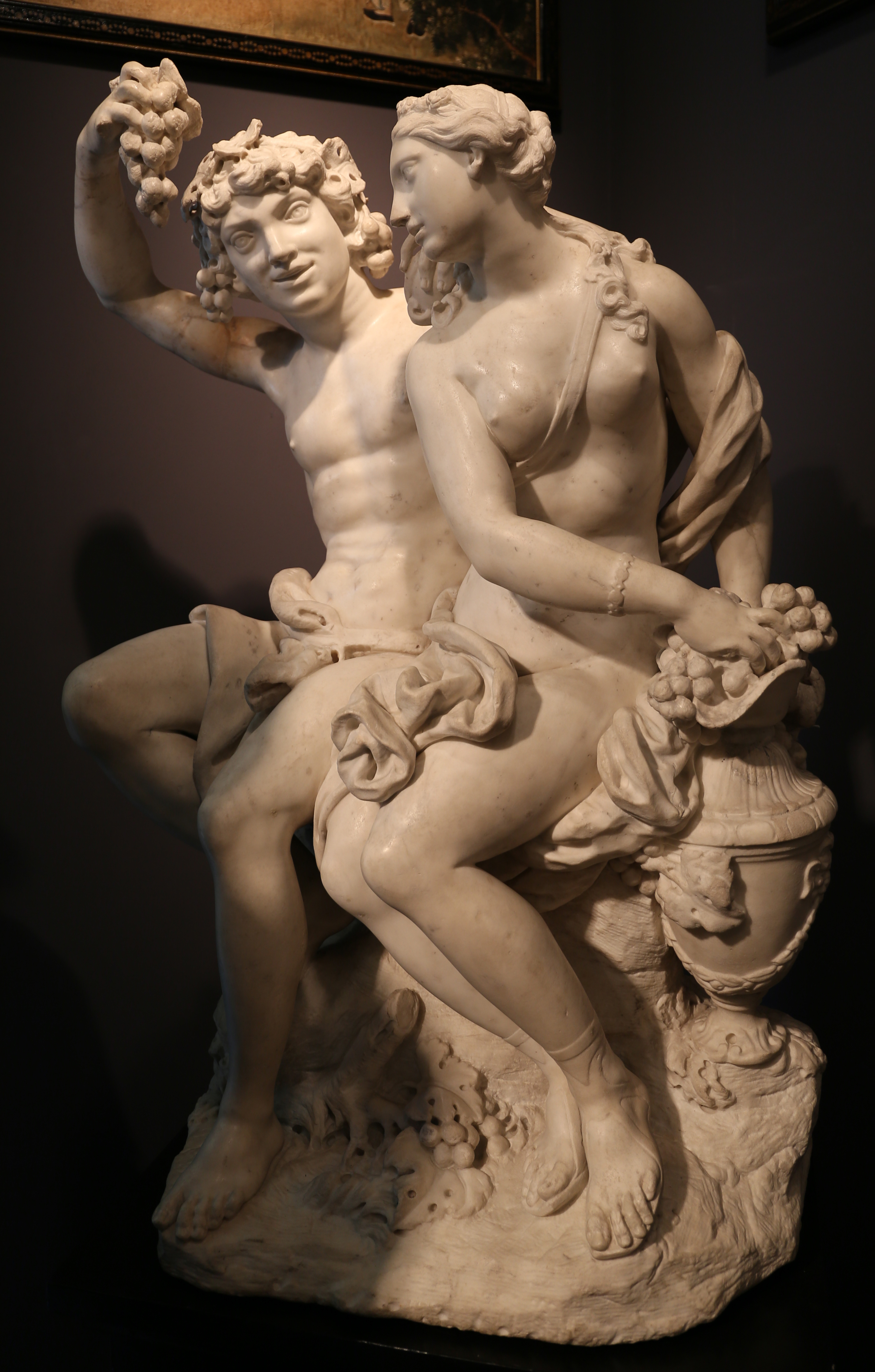
Bacchus and Ariadne, priv. col.

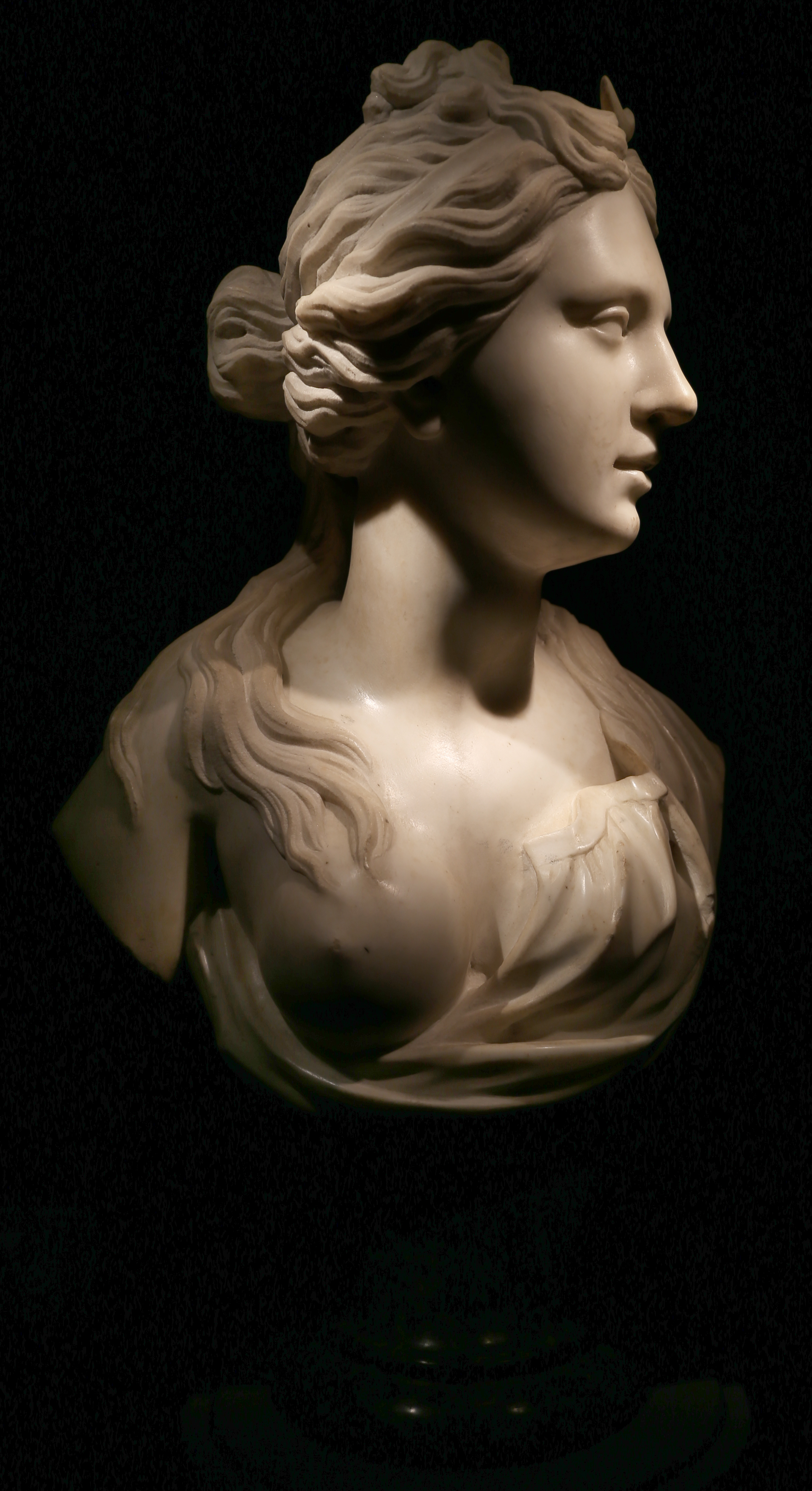
Diana, priv. col.

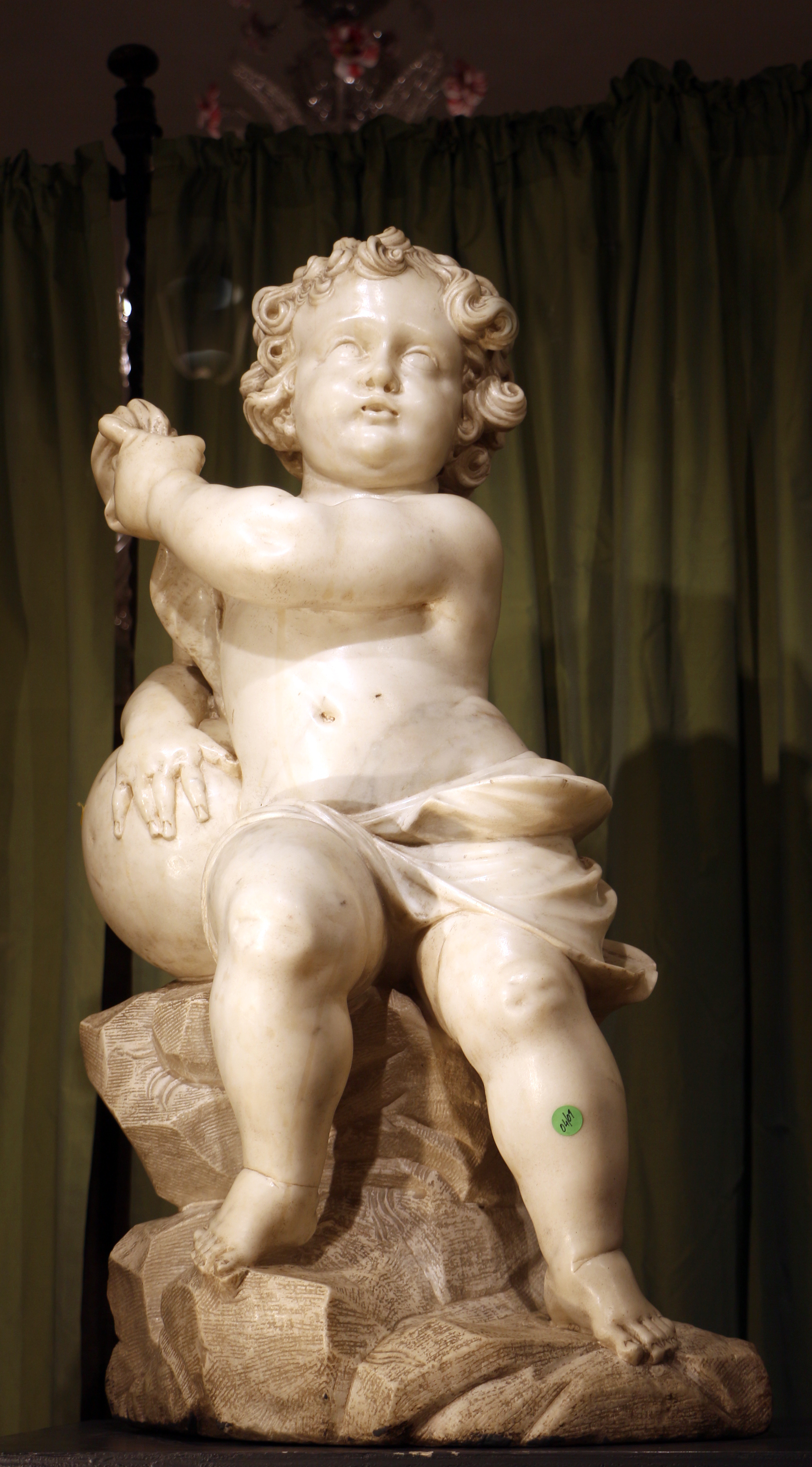
Christ Child, priv. col.

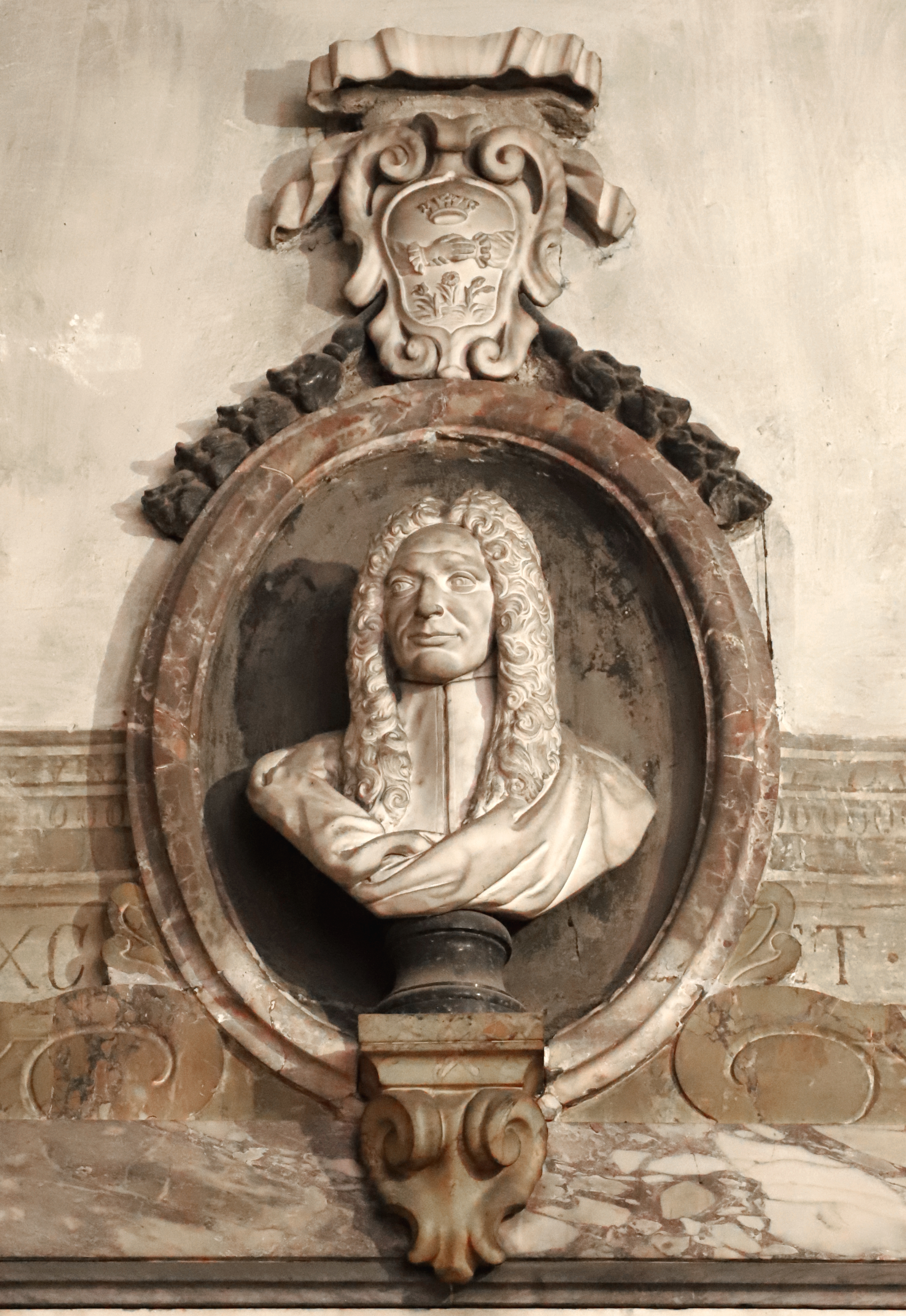
Funerary monument of Giuseppe Del Papa
