= Giacinto Fabbroni =

Italian painter

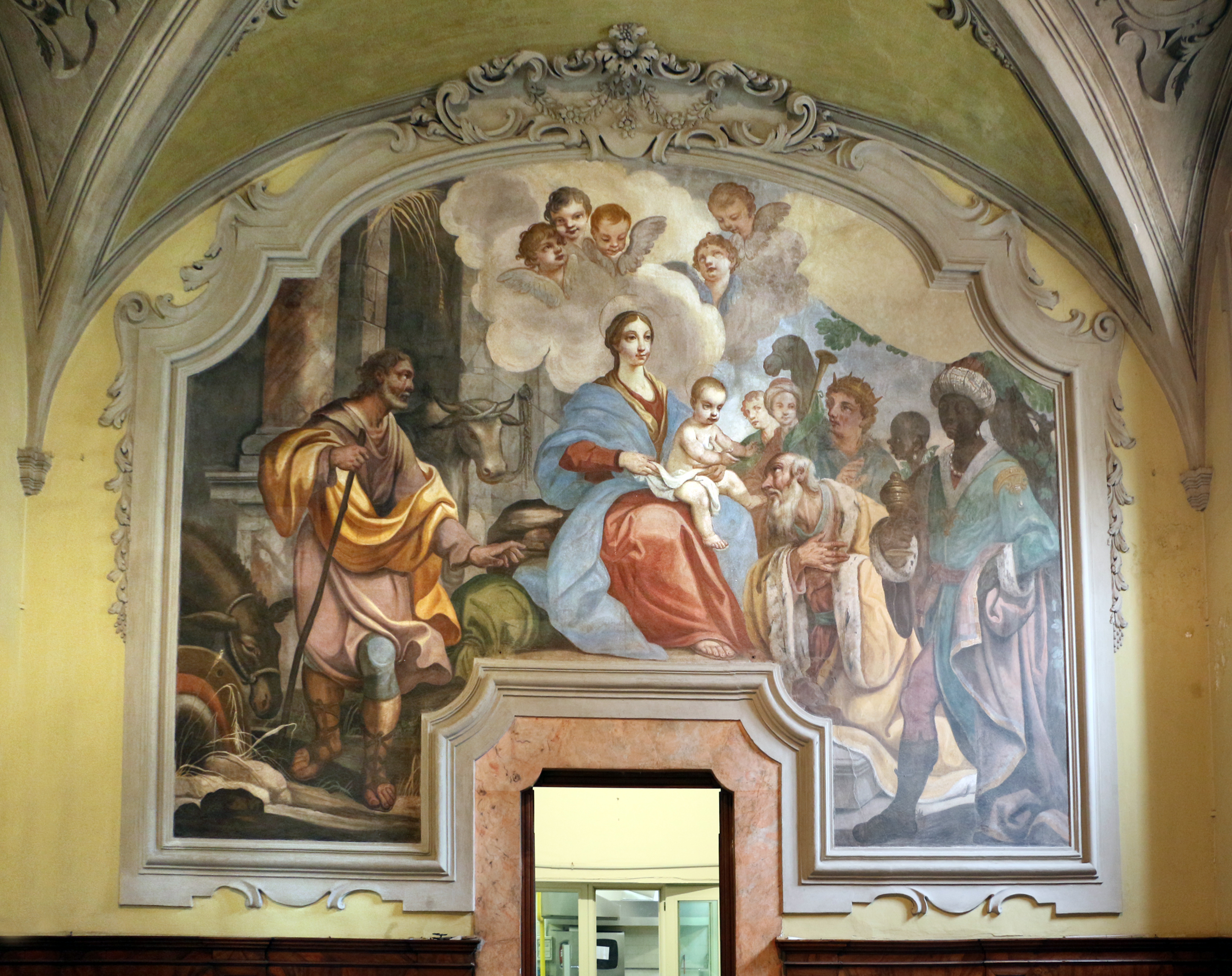
Fresco in collegio Cicognini, Prato

Giacinto Fabbroni (active mid-18th century) was an Italian painter, born in Prato, but mainly active in Impruneta and Florence. He painted an altarpiece of La Concezione for one of the chapels the church of San Gaetano in Florence.
