= List of churches in Florence =

The following is a list of the churches in Florence, Italy. For clarity, it is divided into those churches that are north and south of the River Arno.

== North of the Arno ==
- Florence Cathedral (Duomo di Santa Maria del Fiore)
- Florence Baptistery (Battistero di San Giovanni)
- Santissima Annunziata, Florence (Basilica della Santissima Annunziata)
- Badìa Fiorentina
- Chiesa Valdese (Union of Methodist and Waldensian Churches)
- Gesù Pellegrino
- Ognissanti
- Orsanmichele
- Sant'Agata
- Sant'Ambrogio
- Sant'Apollonia
- Santi Apostoli
- San Barnaba
- San Carlo dei Lombardi
- Santa Croce, Florence (Basilica di Santa Croce di Firenze)
- Sant'Egidio
- San Filippo Neri
- San Gaetano
- San Giovanni di Dio
- San Giovannino dei Cavalieri
- San Giovannino degli Scolopi
- San Giuseppe
- San Jacopo tra Fossi (Evangelical Methodist Church of Florence)
- San Lorenzo
- Santa Lucia
- San Marco
- Santa Margherita de'Cerchi
- Santa Margherita in Santa Maria de'Ricci
- Santa Maria degli Angeli
- Santa Maria dei Candeli
- Santa Maria della Croce al Tempio
- Santa Maria Maddalena dei Pazzi
- Santa Maria Maggiore
- Santa Maria de' Ricci
- Santa Maria Novella
- Santa Maria Sovraporta (deconsecrated)
- Santa Maria della Tromba
- San Martino del Vescovo
- San Michele Visdomini
- San Pancrazio (deconsecrated)
- San Paolino
- San Pier Scheraggio (destroyed)
- San Remigio
- Santa Reparata (destroyed)
- San Salvatore al Vescovo
- San Salvi
- Santi Simone e Giuda
- Santo Stefano al Ponte
- Santa Trìnita

Interior of the Church of Santo Spirito, Florence.

== South of the Arno ==
- Basilica di San Miniato al Monte
- San Carlo dei Barnabiti
- San Felice
- Santa Felicita
- San Francesco di Paola
- San Frediano in Cestello
- San Giorgio sulla Costa
- San Jacopo sopr'Arno
- San Leonardo in Arcetri
- Santa Lucia dei Magnoli
- Santa Maria del Carmine
- Santa Maria al Pignone
- St Mark's English Church
- Santa Monica
- San Niccolò sopr'Arno
- San Piero in Gattolino
- Santa Rosa
- San Salvatore al Monte
- Santo Spirito
- San Vito
- Madonna delle Tosse
- Madonna del Buon Consiglio (Jesuit)
