= Galeotti =

Galeotti is a surname, and may refer to:

- Anna Galeotti (1739–1773), Italian engraver and painter
- Bethany Joy Galeotti (born 1981), American singer and actress
- Cesare Galeotti (1872–1929), Italian composer and pianist
- Daniela Galeotti (born 1977), Italian high jumper
- Giuseppe Galeòtti (1708–1778), Italian painter
- Henri Guillaume Galeotti (1814–1858), French-Belgian botanist and geologist
- Margherita Galeotti (1867 – after 1912), Italian pianist and composer
- Mark Galeotti (born 1965), British scholar
- Martius Galeotti (1427–1494), Italian humanist
- Sebastiano Galeotti (1656–1746), Italian painter
- Sergio Galeotti (1945–1985), Italian architect and co-founder of the Giorgio Armani Corporation
- Vincenzo Galeotti (1733–1816), Italian-born Danish dancer, choreographer and ballet master
