= Giovanni Domenico Ferretti =

Italian painter

Vincenzo Camuccini
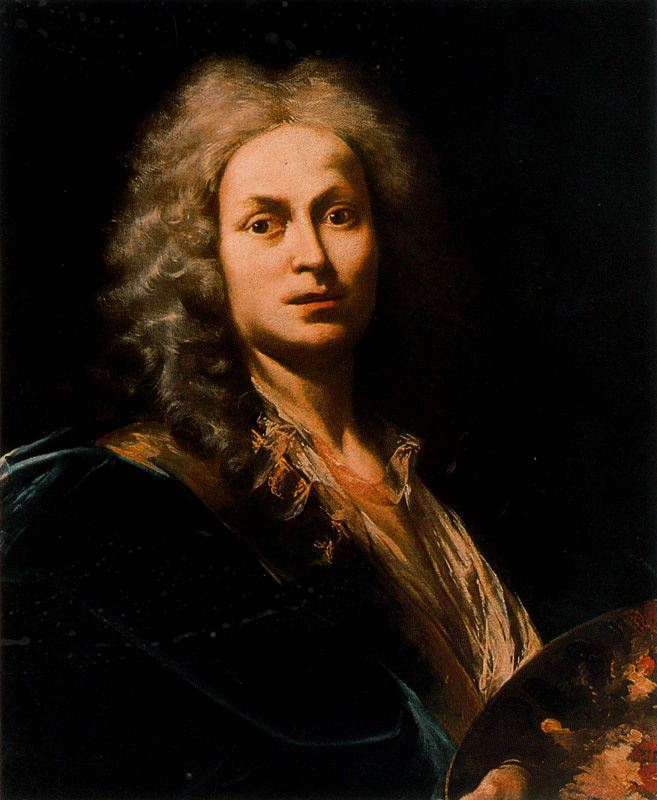
- Ferretti's Self Portrait, Florence, Uffizi
- Born: 15 June 1692; Florence, Grand Duchy of Tuscany
- Died: 18 August 1768 (aged 76); Florence, Grand Duchy of Tuscany
- Known for: Historical and religious painting
- Movement: Rococo
- Patrons: Gian Gastone de' Medici

Signature
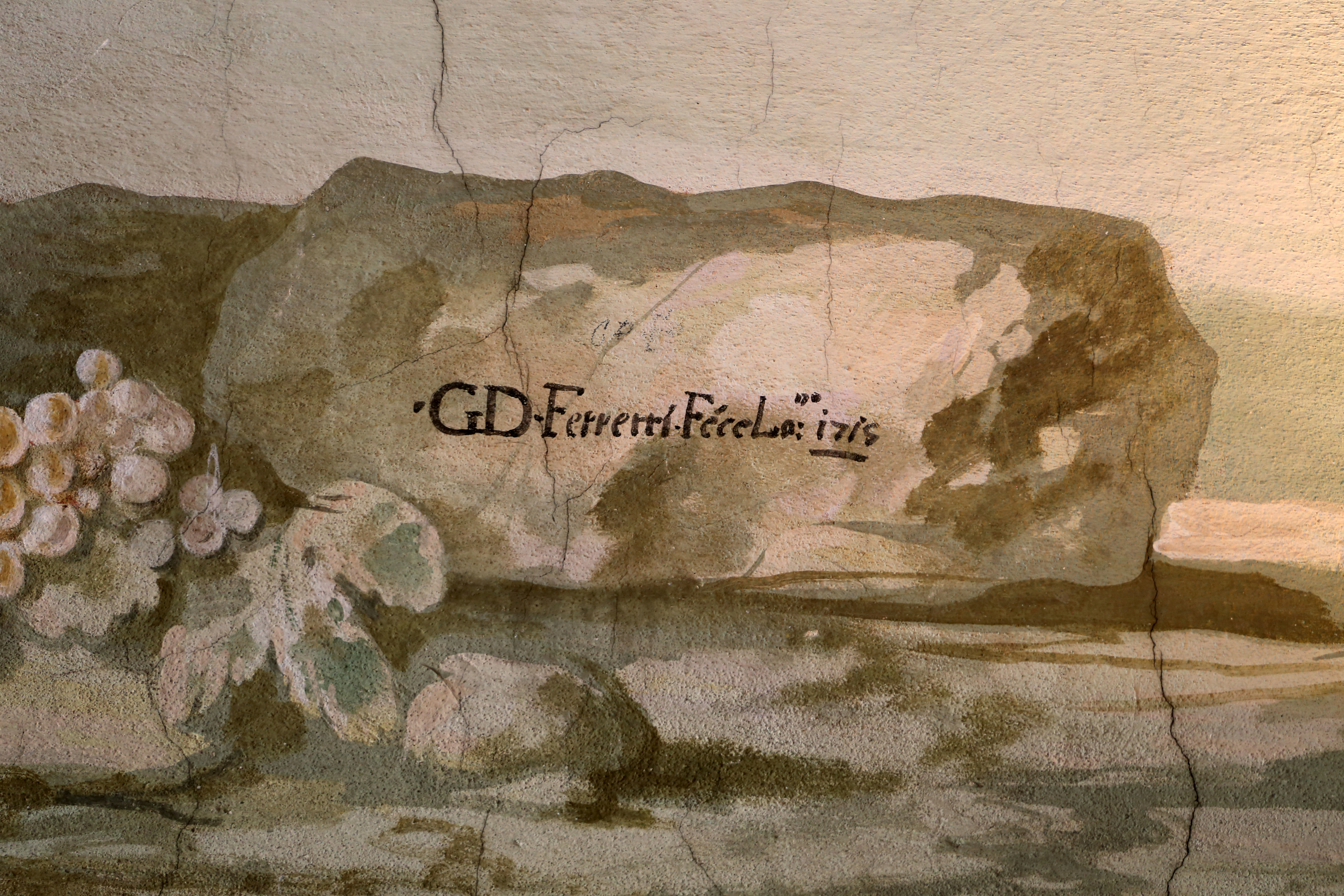

Giovanni Domenico Ferretti (Giandomenico), also called Giandomenico d'Imola (15 June 1692 – 18 August 1768), was an Italian Rococo style painter from Florence. His fresco style was influenced by Sebastiano Ricci's lively, colourful, and pastel-hued frescoes in the Palazzo Fenzi.

== Biography ==
=== Early career ===
Giovanni Domenico Ferretti was born in Florence on 15 June 1692, the son of Antonio di Giovanni da Imola and Margherita di Domenico Gori. He was the nephew of the antiquarian Antonio Francesco Gori. He spent his youth in Imola with his parents. Back in Florence, he studied painting under Tommaso Redi and Sebastiano Galeotti. He travelled to Bologna to work under Felice Torelli and then resettled in Florence in 1715. Ferretti soon joined the Florentine Accademia del Disegno, where he later taught painting but also designed tapestries for the Medici.

Between 1718 and 1719, thanks to the protection of Cardinal Gozzadini, Ferretti obtained several commissions in Bologna and Imola. At the latter he decorated the cupola of the cathedral with images of the patron saints, John Cassian, Peter Chrysologus, Praejectus and Maurelius. Back in Florence he produced two canvases for the church of the Impruneta (1721–2) and an oval painting for the Badia of Castiglion Fiorentino showing the Ecstasy of Saint Teresa of Avila with Saint Catherine of Siena (1723), which is the only signed and dated work surviving from the early part of his career.

Among the most important works of his youthful period are the decoration of the ceiling of a salone in the Palazzo Nonfinito in Florence (1715–20) and the ceiling of the great staircase of the Palazzo Amati-Cellesi in Pistoia (1721), which shows the strong influence of the cycle painted by Sebastiano Ricci in the Palazzo Fenzi (1706–7). The airy quality of Ricci’s compositions, however, is interpreted in the light of Ferretti’s own Emilian training. Ferretti went on to develop his interest in the bozzetto (oil sketch), a form particularly congenial to him.

In 1725 Ferretti frescoed some rooms in the Villa Puccini near Pistoia; by this time he had clearly achieved a distinctive, personal approach to style and the rhythmic composition of figures. From about 1728, if not before, he worked for the arazzeria or tapestry workshop of Gian Gastone de' Medici, the Grand Duke of Tuscany, for which several payments are listed. He undertook to design a tapestry representing Water, in collaboration with Lorenzo del Moro, who executed the decorative friezes and also assisted him in other projects during the following years. The Rape of Europa (Florence, Uffizi) was probably the modello for the cartoon of a tapestry, which was never finished, and which had been intended to hang beside those of Fire by Giuseppe Grisoni and of Air by Vincenzo Meucci.

=== Mature years ===
The increased number of Ferretti’s commissions and academic honours accompanied his growing reputation in Florence. In 1731 he became one of the Dodici Maestri di Pittura at the Accademia di Belle Arti di Firenze, and in the following year he became Console of the same institution, a post he retained almost until his death. In the 1730s he produced some of his most important works for numerous Florentine churches. In 1734 he finished the decoration of the choir and apse of the Badia Fiorentina, with the Martyrdom of St Stephen and the Assumption and Coronation of the Virgin. In collaboration with Mauro Soderini, formerly his colleague in the Torelli workshop in Bologna, Ferretti completed two decorative cycles (1736–7). The first was for the oratory of the Madonna della Quercia at Le Cure (near Florence), in which Rinaldo Botti also participated; this was lost at the end of the 18th century, when the building was modernized. The second cycle, painted with Meucci also, is in San Domenico al Maglio in Florence. In the same year the Archbishop of Florence, Giuseppe Montelli, commissioned from a group of painters the decoration of his private chapel, San Salvatore al Vescovado. Ferretti was responsible for the apse with the Adoration of the Shepherds and the cupola with God the Father Blessing.

Ferretti’s fame also extended outside Florence. In Pistoia he painted the work that is considered his masterpiece, the frescoes in the church of San Prospero e Filippo (1731–46). His collaborators were Lorenzo del Moro and Pietro Anderlini, who painted the quadratura passages. These paintings, which are outstanding for their complexity and monumentality, represent the moment of the artist’s fullest maturity, having absorbed the influence of Ricci and translated the solidity learnt from his Emilian masters into airy and elegant forms. In 1741, for the chapel of San Giuseppe in Florence Cathedral, he painted the canvas of the Death of Saint Joseph; and in the refectory of the convent of the Santissima Annunziata he produced frescoes depicting scenes from the Life of Christ.

Harlequin and Columbine

Ferretti’s sureness of technique is manifested not only in his large religious compositions but also in such secular paintings as the frescoed allegorical scenes in the Sala delle Stagioni in the Palazzo Sansedoni at Siena. His various series of Harlequinades (1742), depicting burlesque genre scenes of characters from Commedia dell'Arte, were undoubtedly influenced by the presence of Goldoni in Florence that year. In these the treatment of the still-lifes and the naturalistic details reflect the influence of the Bolognese painter Giuseppe Crespi, which can, in fact, already be seen in some of the artist’s early works. In the last phase of his career Ferretti produced several elaborate paintings, which in some places show a decline in quality and a few concessions to academic taste. Among these were the Martyrdom of Saint Bartholomew for Santi Ranieri e Luigi in San Giuliano Terme (near Pisa), and the Adoration of the Magi in San Paolino, Florence. In 1755 he worked on the last great decorative project of his life, the frescoes for Santa Maria del Carmine in Florence. The work was carried out in several stages. First he decorated the chapels of Saint Lucy and the Ascension with frescoes of Saint Mary Magdalene de’ Pazzi and Angels and Saint Andrea Corsini and Angels. Three years later, on the inner façade of the church, he painted four pictures framed by stucco decorations, showing the Blessed Angelico Mazzinghi and the Venerable Arcangiolo Paoli with Groups of Angels. The cycle also includes a grandiose canvas depicting the Deposition, which was to have been placed in the chapel of Saint Jerome, but the rather uneven quality of the painting betrays the participation of assistants. This was the only work to escape the disastrous fire of 1771 that destroyed the rest.

Ferretti died while working on the canvas of the Virgin Giving the Scapular to Saint Simeon Stock for the central nave of the church, and the work was left for his pupil Alessandro Masini to complete.

== Gallery ==
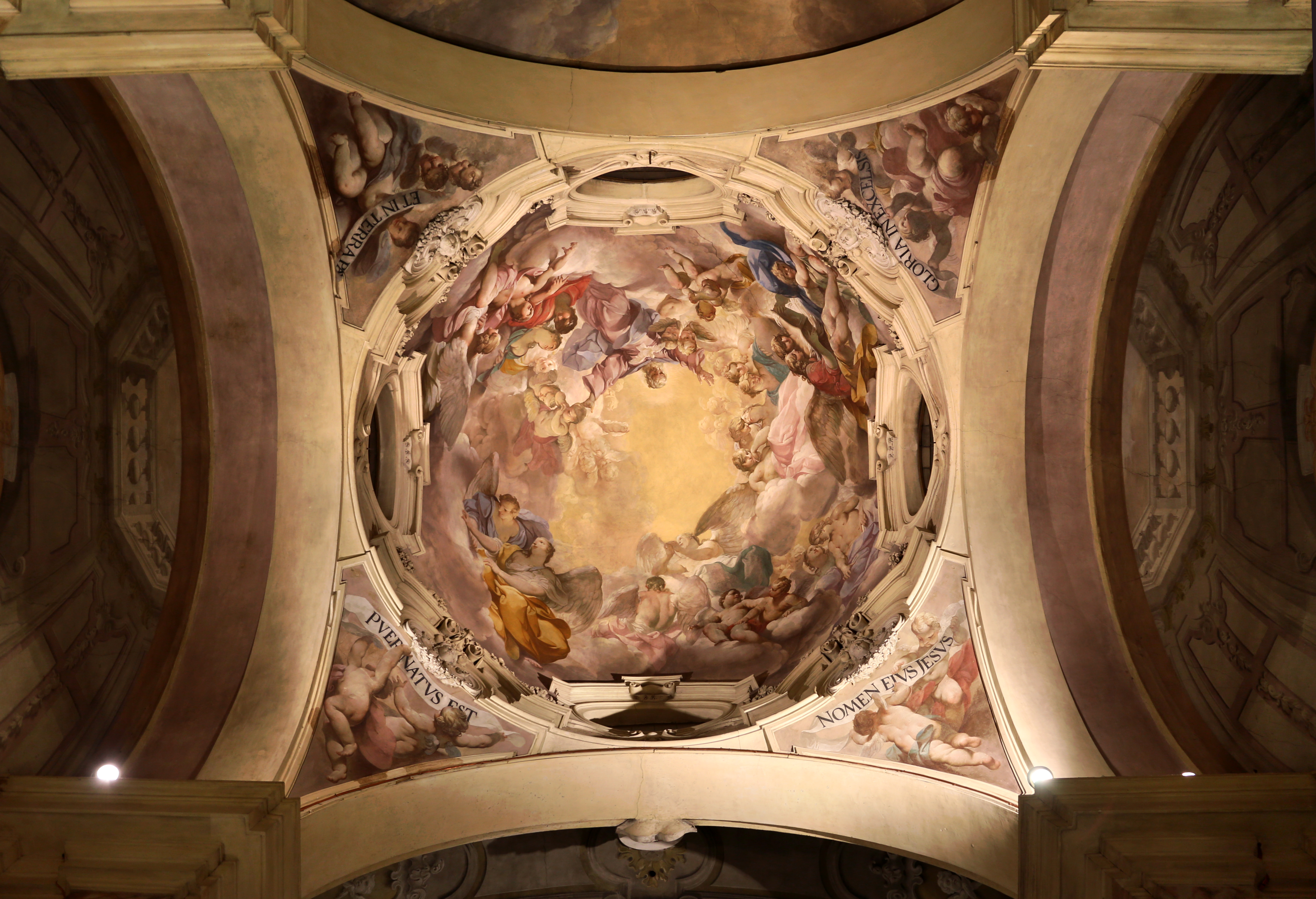
God the Father Blessing, San Salvatore al Vescovado, Florence

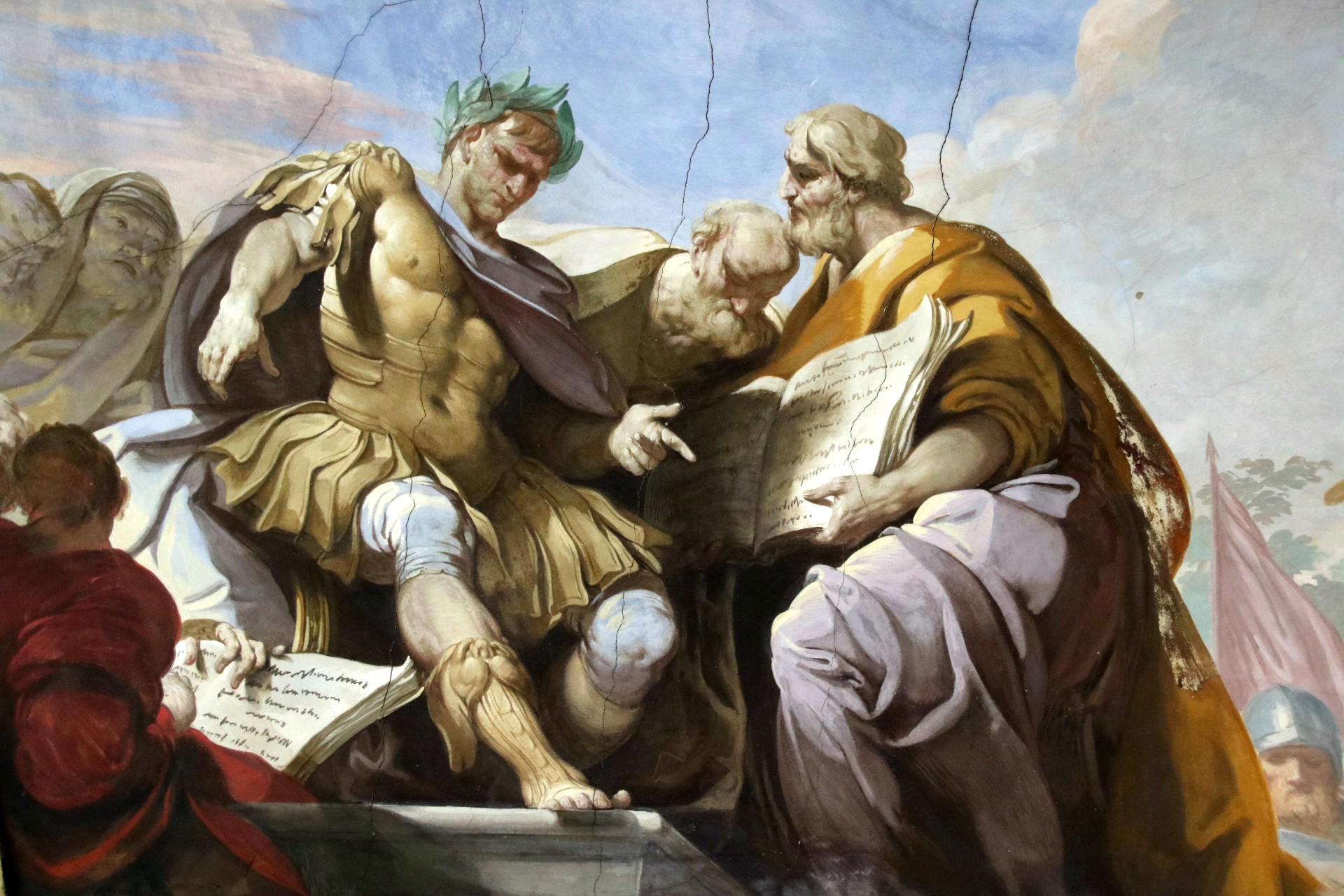
Emperor Justinian dictating the Pandects, Palazzo Quaratesi, Pisa

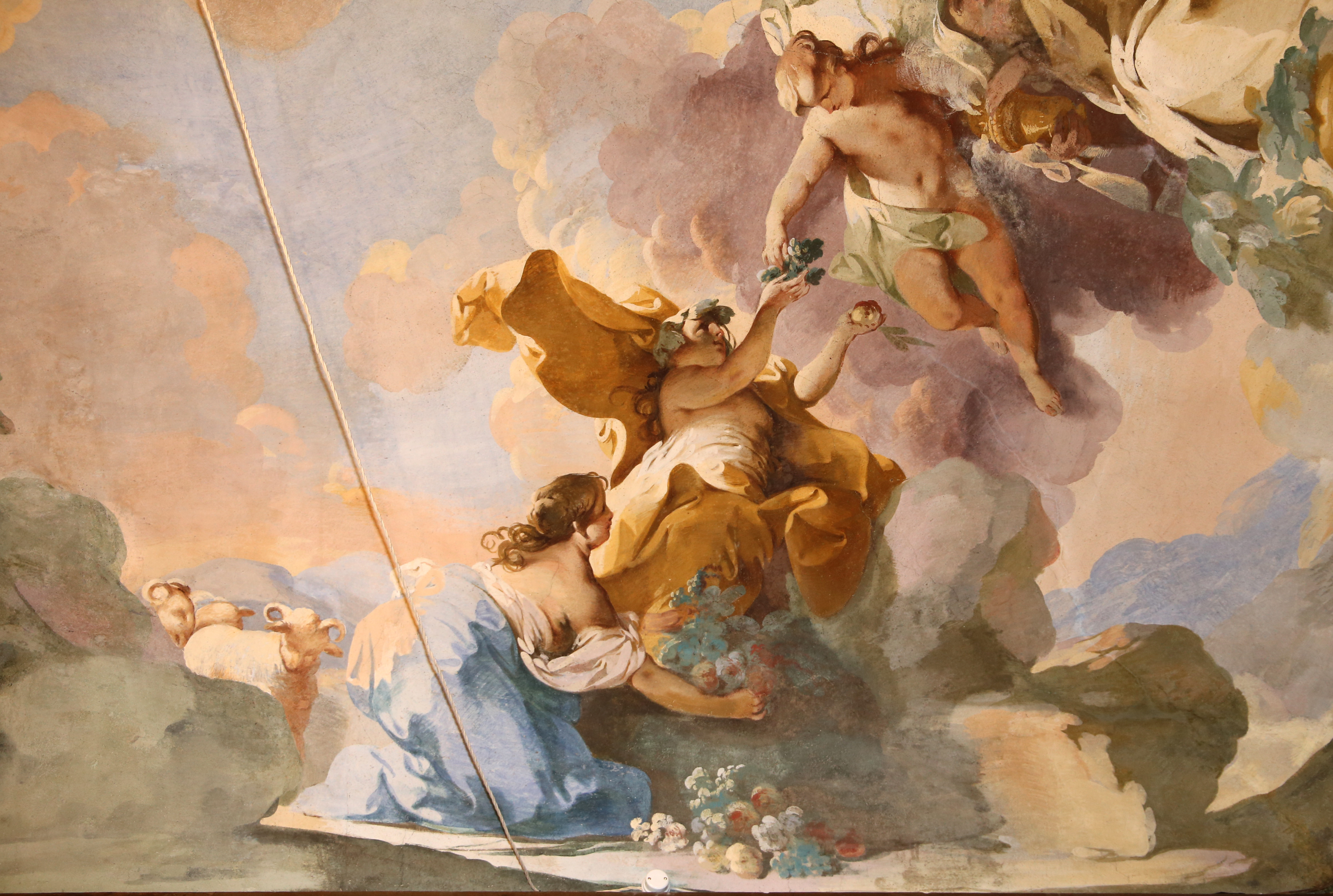
Triumph of Bacchus, Villa Puccini, Scornio

Maenads, before 1737, Palazzo Pitti, Florence

Sts. Francis of Paola, Pius V, Francis of Assisi, and Charles Borromeo, c. 1723, Palazzo Pitti, Florence

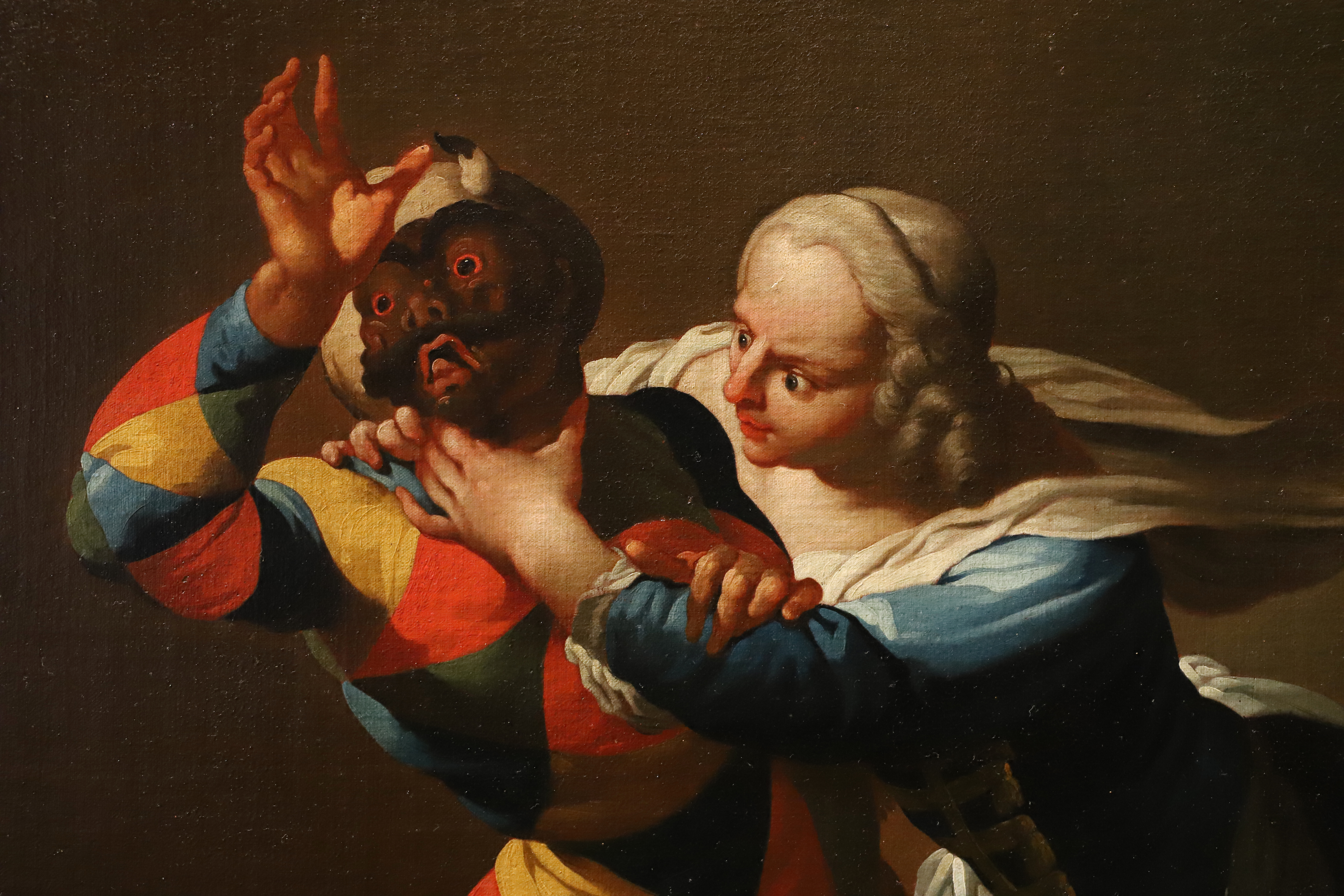
Harlequin Attacked, 1746–49, priv. col.

Cicero's Commentators, before 1751, priv. col.
