= Pietro Anderlini =

Italian painter

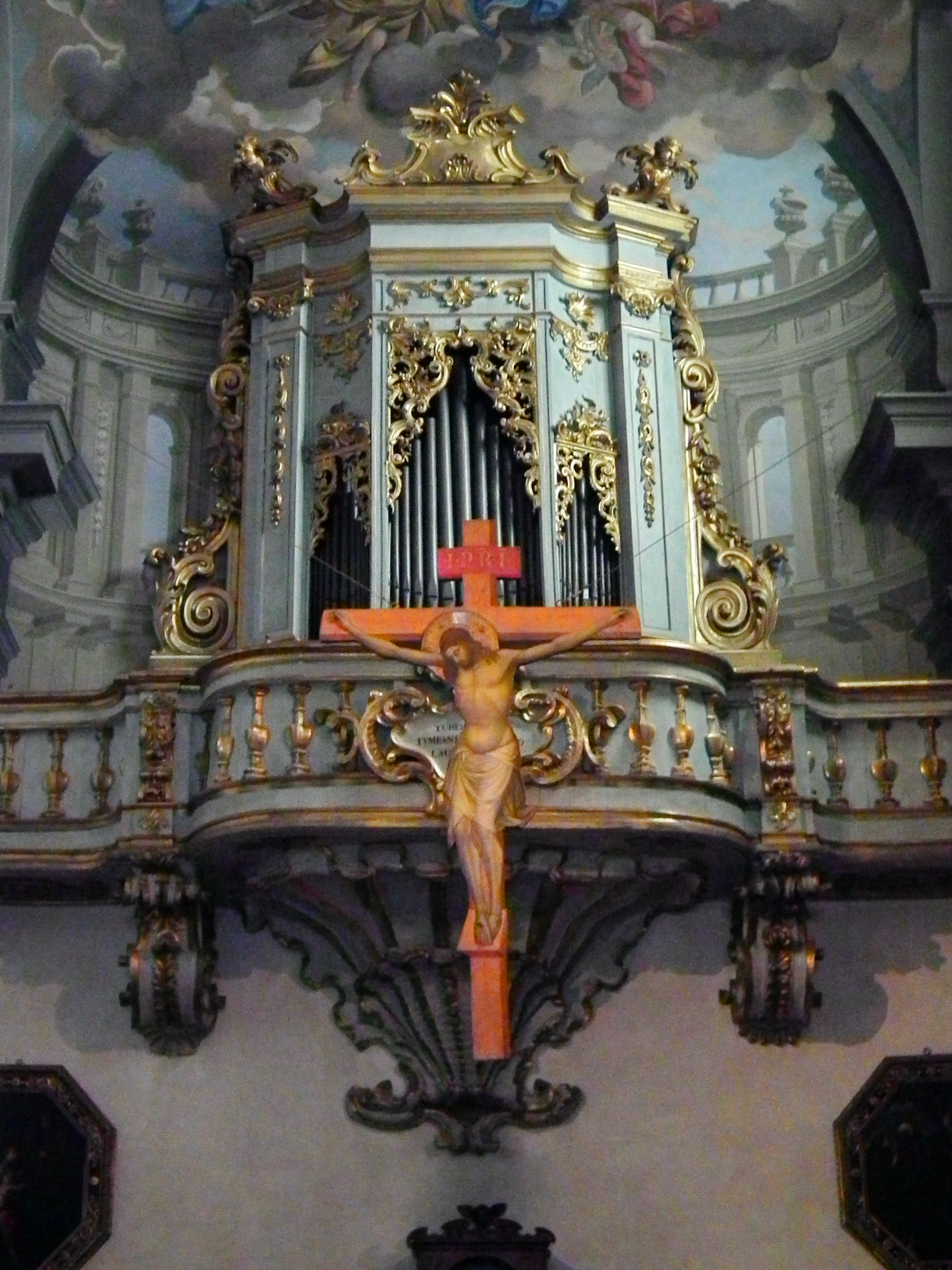
Illusionistic perspective behind the organ by Pietro Anderlini, San Giuseppe (Florence)

Pietro Anderlini, also Andorlini, (1687–1755) was an Italian painter of the Rococo period.

== Biography ==
He was born and died in Florence, Grand Duchy of Tuscany. Anderlini was a pupil of Giuseppe Tonelli, and his first documented work was the fresco of the Convent of San Lorenzo in Florence in 1718. He worked alongside, and on behalf, of some of the main Florentine painters of the 1700s.

The quadratura fresco style that he painted in was widely used by contemporary painters to embellish with designs of their own works architectures, the most famous of these painters were Gerolamo Mengozzi Colonna and Giovanni Battista Tiepolo.

== Works ==
Among the works mentioned in the eighteenth-century guides of Florence were:

- Frescoes in the basement of San Lorenzo, on the vault above the altar of the Compagnia di San Lorenzo, with architecture by Anderlini and the background by Niccolò Nannetti (completed and discovered on 17 September 1718);
- Grotesque on the walls and vaults of the church of S. Salvatore in Vescovo;
- Frescoes on the staircase and in the atrium that introduce the "great hall" in the archbishop's palace which was rebuilt in 1737 by Monsignor Giuseppe Martelli (architecture by Anderlini background by Vincenzo Meucci);
- frescoes in the church of San Giuseppe, in collaboration with Sigismondo Betti, and in the Benedictine abbey in collaboration with Onorio Marinari.
