= Mauro Soderini =

Italian painter

Mauro Soderini (1704 – after 1739/1751) was an Italian painter of the late Baroque period, mainly painting sacred subjects and active in his native Florence.

He studied in Bologna and Rome. In Florence he worked with Vincenzo Meucci and Giovanni Domenico Ferretti. He painted altarpieces for San Salvatore: a Deposition (1738; and for Santo Stefano: a Miracle of San Zenobi (1745). Luigi Lanzi describes him as a pupil of Giovanni Camillo Sagrestani or of Sagrestani's mentor, Carlo Cignani.
