= Palazzo Dosi-Magnavacca, Pontremoli =

The Palazzo Dossi-Magnavacca is a prominent Late-Baroque palace in the town of Pontremoli in the province of Massa and Carrara, Region of Tuscany, Italy. It is still the property of the Magnavacca family.

== History ==
The palace was commissioned by a rich merchant and Marquis of the Dosi family, and built during 1742-1749 using designs of the painter and architect Giovanni Battista Natali.

The palace entrance includes a scenic interior staircase leading to the Piano Nobile. It contains a vedute by Antonio Contestabili. The large salon is decorated with Rococo stucco work, and painted with mythologic frescoes with quadratura by Natali and figures by Giuseppe Galeotti. Among the subjects is a Triumph of the Dosi Family in the ceiling, and in the walls, Neptune and Galatea, Mercury seeks to free Proserpine from Hades, and the Rape of Europa.
