= Anna Galeotti =

Italian artist (1739–1773)

Anna Galeotti (1739–1773) was an Italian engraver and painter.

== Biography ==
Born in Florence, Galeotti trained under the engraver Cosimo Colombini. She then studied painting under Violante Cerroti. Finally she worked also under Giuseppe Parenti, a pupil of Vincenzo Meucci.

Galeotti painted a St Lawrence for the church of Castelbonfi. She painted altarpieces for churches in Porciano, Pontedera, and Lari. She settled and married in Arezzo, where she continued to paint, including a canvas for the Capuchin priests. She was in demand as a portraitist.
