= Pier Francesco Foschi =

Italian painter

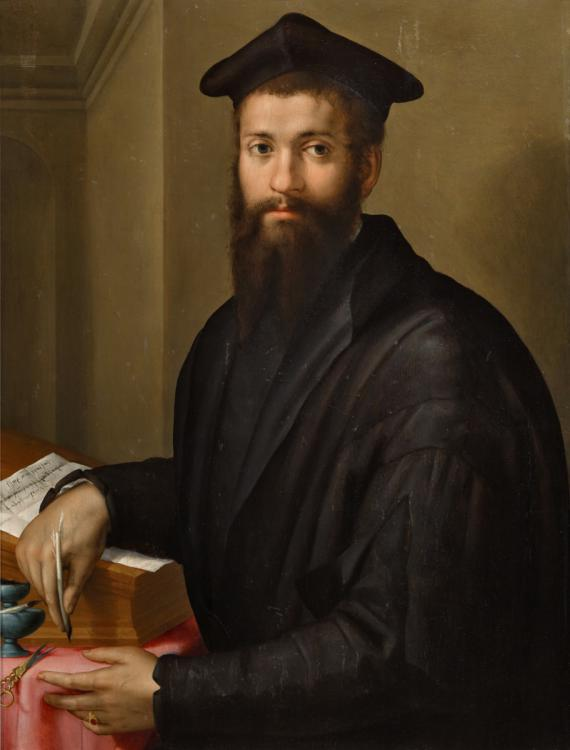
Portrait of Giovanni Salviati by Pier Francesco Foschi (Moscow, Pushkin Museum of Fine Arts)

Pier Francesco Foschi (1502–1567) was an Italian painter active in Florence in a Mannerist style. He was pupil of Andrea del Sarto and assisted Pontormo with his frescoes at Careggi in 1536. He completed 3 altarpieces, commissioned in 1540–1545 for the church of Santo Spirito in Florence: an Immaculate Conception, Resurrection, and a Transfiguration. Foschi was also influenced by Il Bronzino. One of his pupils was Alessandro Fei.

Also called Pier Francesco di Jacopo Foschi or Toschi, he was the son of Jacopo Sandro Foschi, known for his Madonna and Child with the Infant Saint John. (Utah Museum of Fine Arts).

Foschi is best noted for his portraits painted between 1530 and 1540, including his Portrait of a Lady (Museo Thyssen-Bornemisza), Portrait of a Young Man Weaving a Wreath of Flowers (Utah Museum of Fine Arts), and his Portrait of a Man, (Uffizi Gallery).

In his portraits he adhered to Mannerist style, utilizing a slight Contrapposto in the sitter with their head turned from the body. This pose gave the depiction a spontaneity and sense of movement for the innovative Mannerists, but was eventually so formulaic that it lost its intention of originality. Foschi's Portrait of a Lady and Portrait of a Man Weaving a Wreath of Flowers, shows an interesting use of background and subtle symbolisms to convey the essence of the sitter, while his Portrait of a Man (at the Uffizi), shows a more standard portrait depiction of the period.

In 2022, the Georgia Museum of Art at the University of Georgia organized the first exhibition devoted entirely to Foschi's work and published an exhibition catalogue that is the most widely available resource on the artist. Additional information and context

Foschi lived and worked in Florence during a time of intense artistic and cultural transformation, closely linked to the Medici court and the intellectual circles surrounding it. His early career was shaped by the balanced compositions and soft modeling of Andrea del Sarto, while his mature works display the refined elegance and cool tonalities typical of Bronzino and the Florentine Mannerists.

In addition to his portraits, Foschi produced a number of religious commissions for both private patrons and public institutions. These works, such as the Immaculate Conception and Transfiguration in Santo Spirito, reveal a delicate equilibrium between devotional intensity and formal sophistication. His figures are often idealized, with graceful gestures and polished contours that reflect the Mannerist pursuit of beauty and perfection.

Foschi's social connections included members of the Salviati and Strozzi families, which granted him access to Florence's elite clientele. His Portrait of Giovanni Salviati (Pushkin Museum, Moscow) is a notable example of how he integrated status symbols and subtle iconographic details to communicate moral and intellectual virtues.

Although highly regarded during his lifetime, Foschi's reputation declined in later centuries, and many of his works were misattributed to other painters. It was only in the late 20th and early 21st centuries that scholars began to reassess his contribution to Florentine art.

In 2022, the Georgia Museum of Art at the University of Georgia organized the exhibition "Disputed Beauty: Pier Francesco Foschi and Painting in Renaissance Florence", accompanied by a scholarly catalogue that reestablished his position as a key figure in the transition between High Renaissance harmony and Mannerist refinement.

== Gallery ==
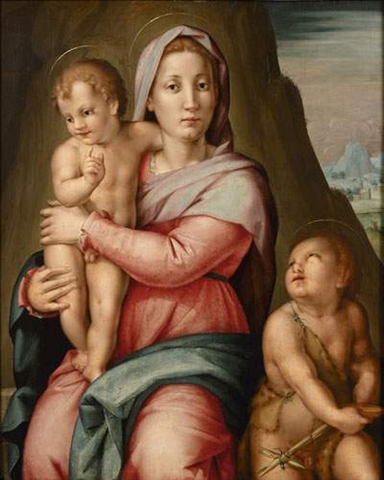
Madonna, child and John the Baptist

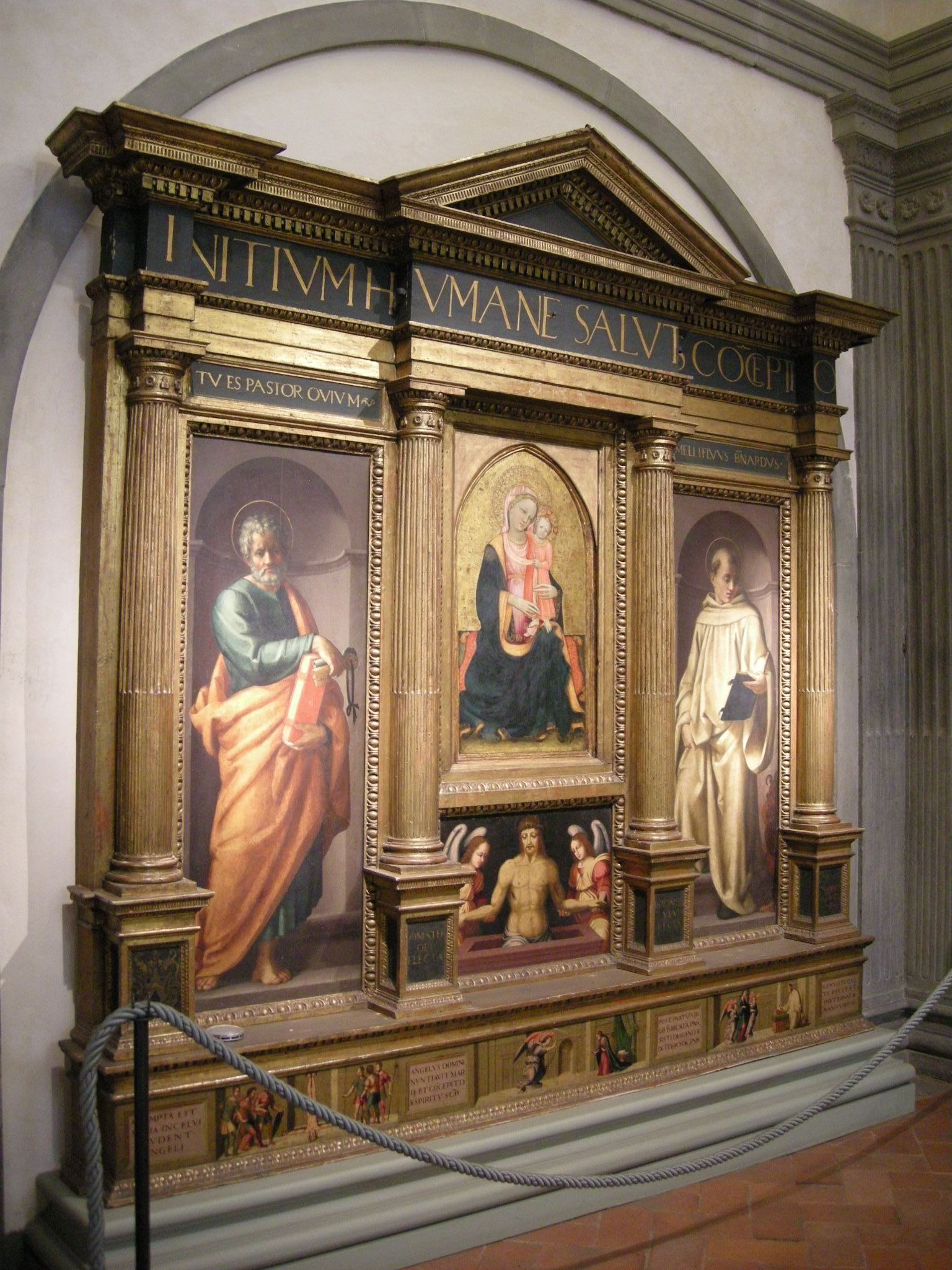
Oratory dei Bini, lateral panels by Foschi

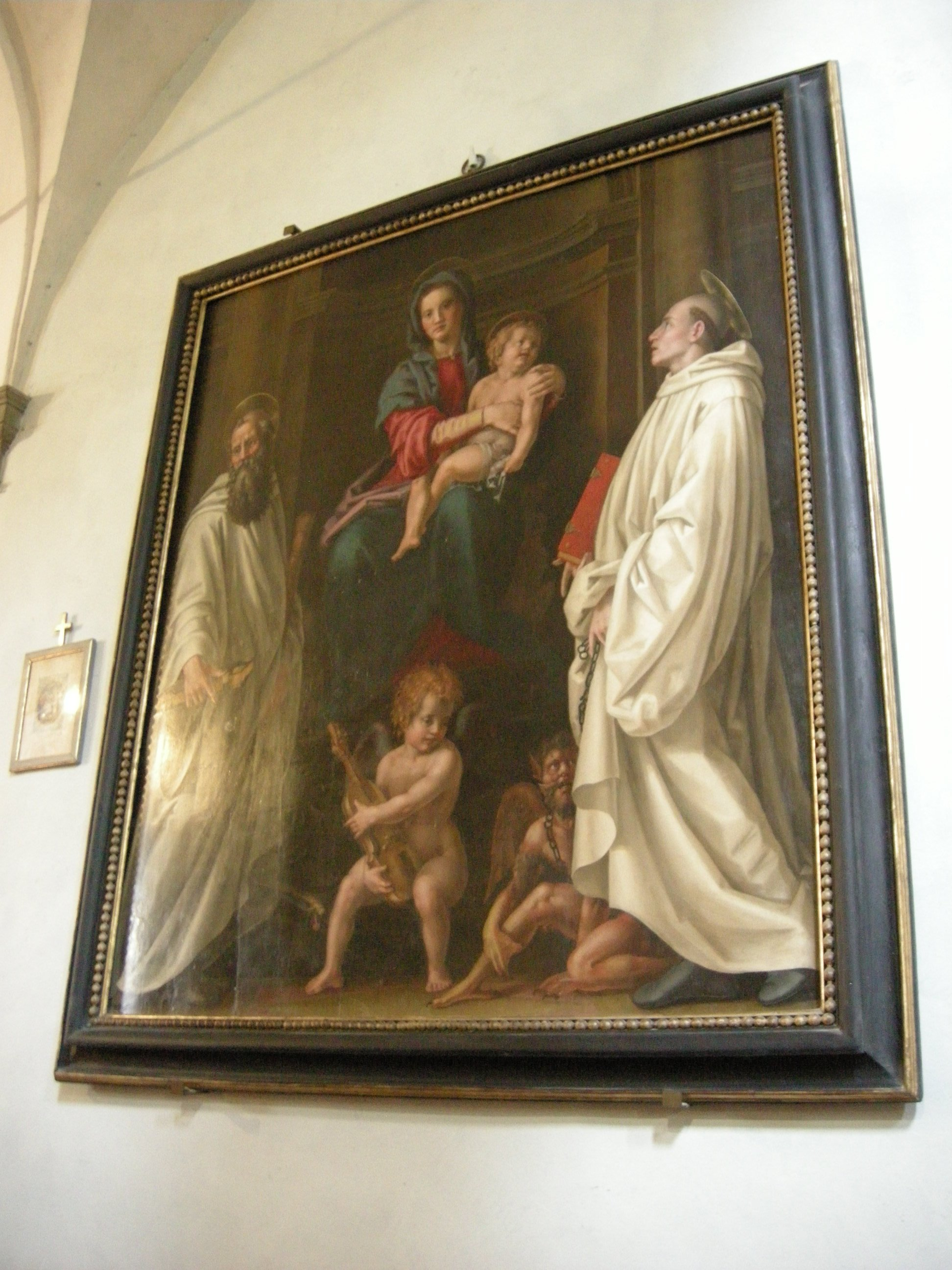
Madonna, child, and Saints (San Barnaba, Florence)

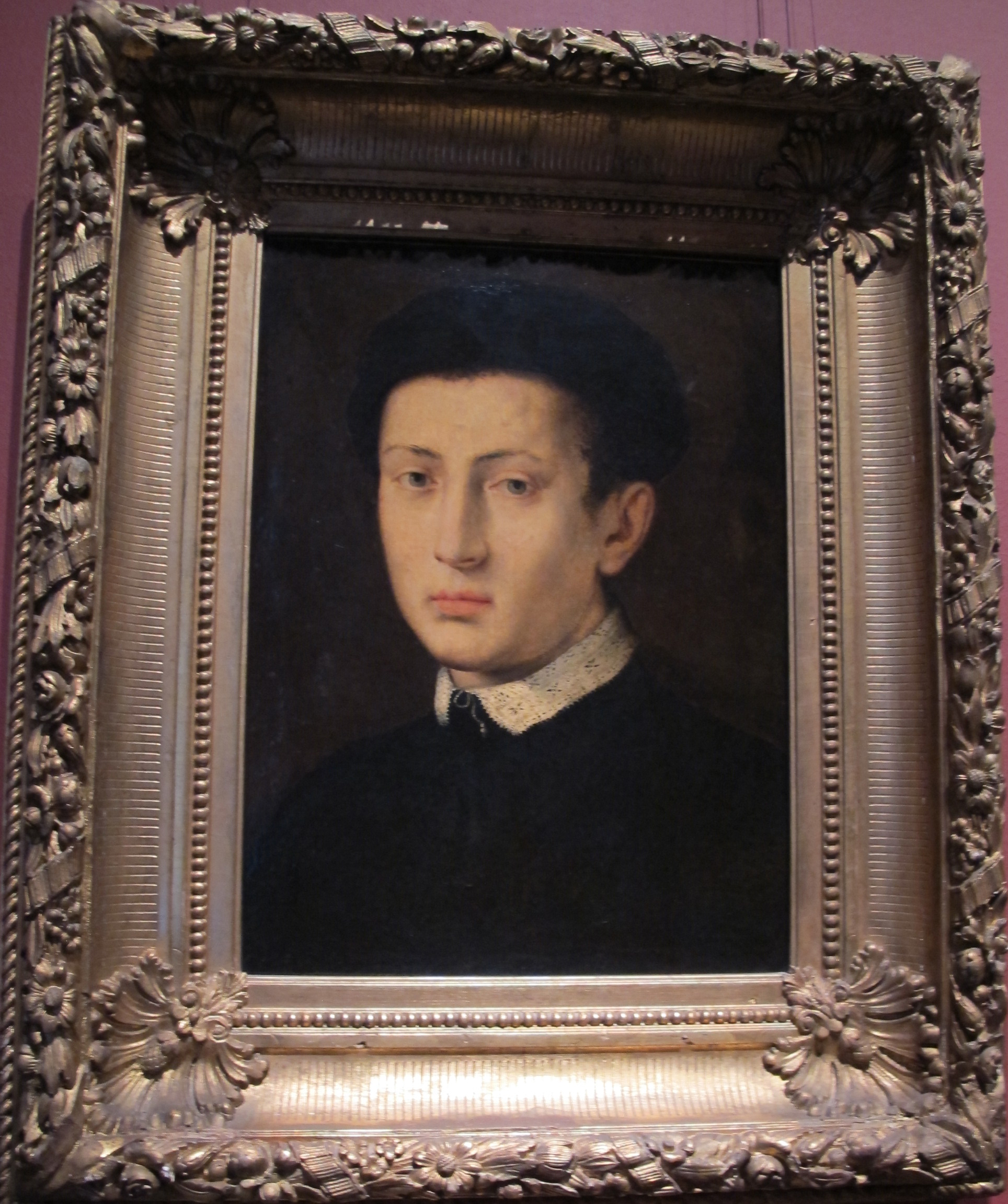
Portrait of Young Man (Pushkin Museum)

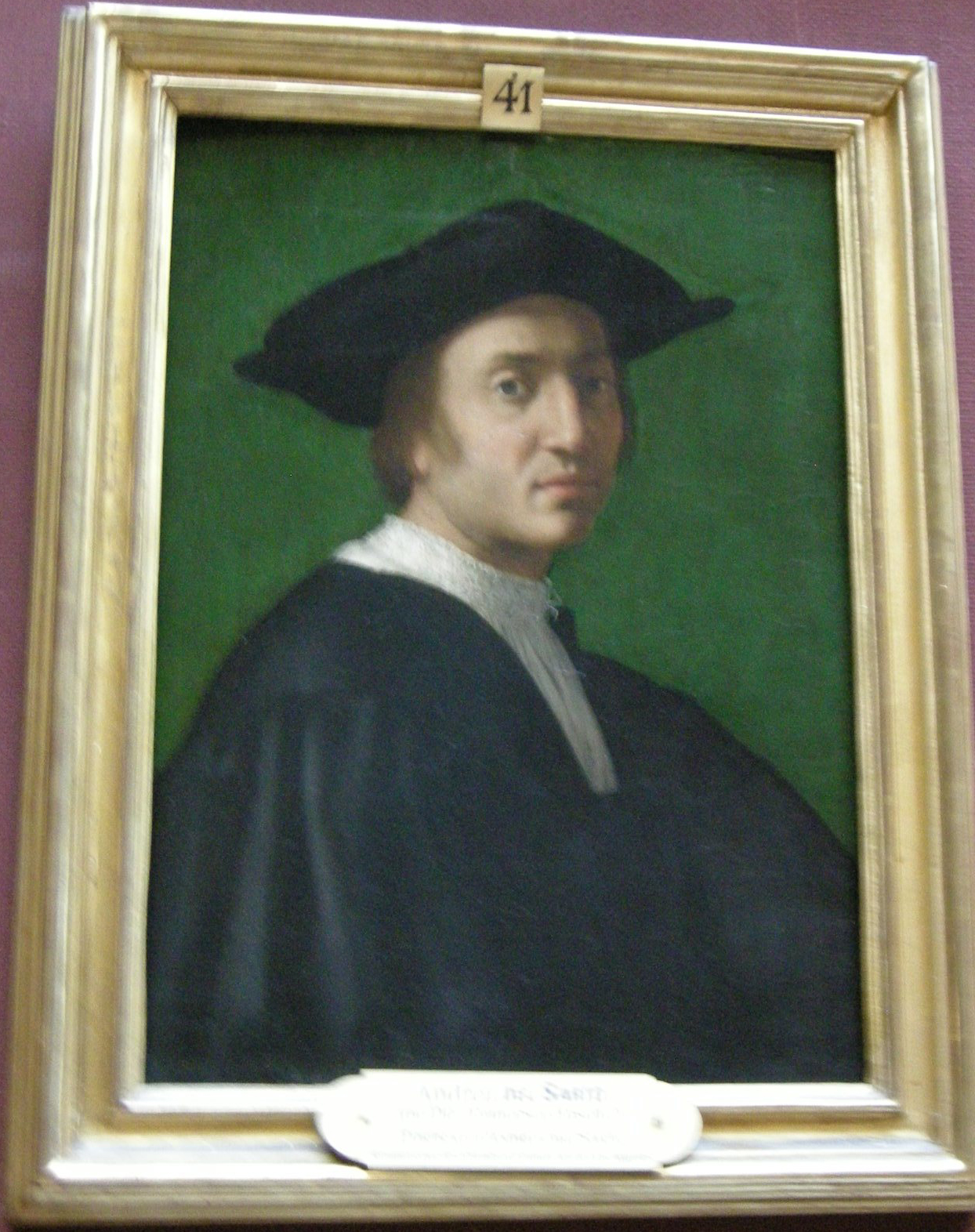
Andrea del Sarto (1486–1530)

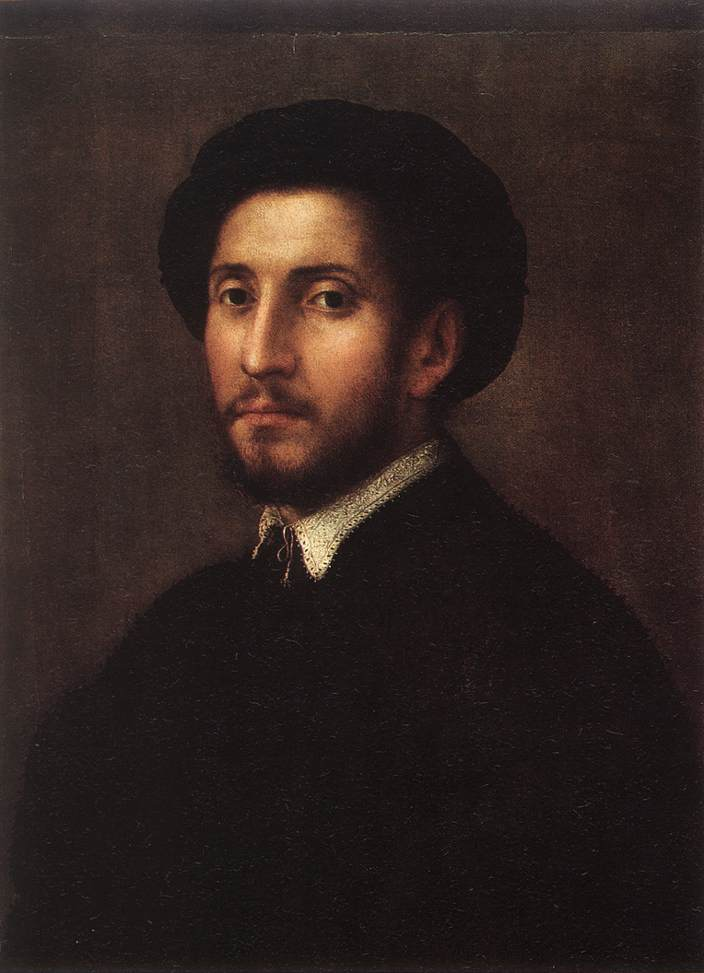
Portrait of Man (Uffizi)

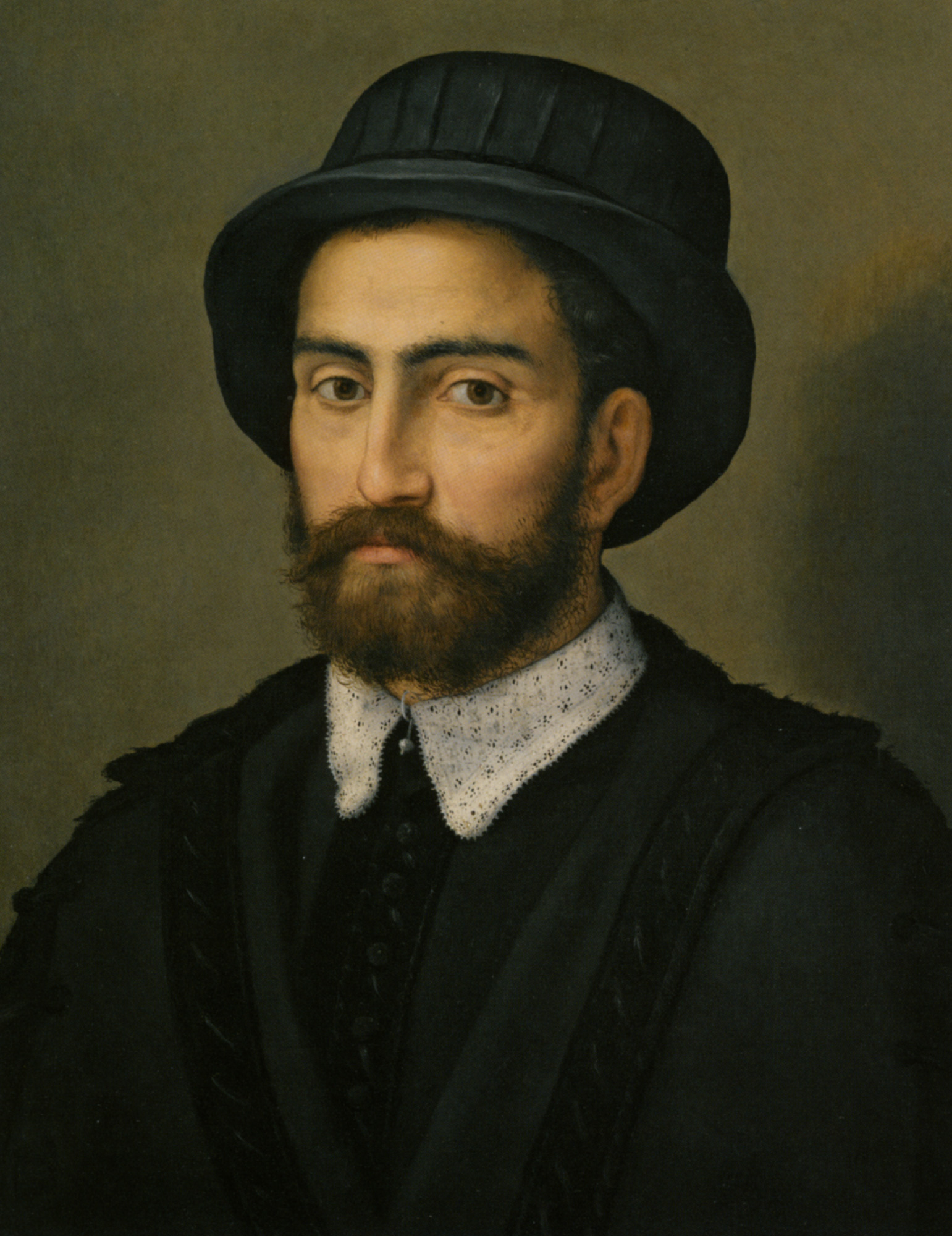
Portrait of Man with Hat

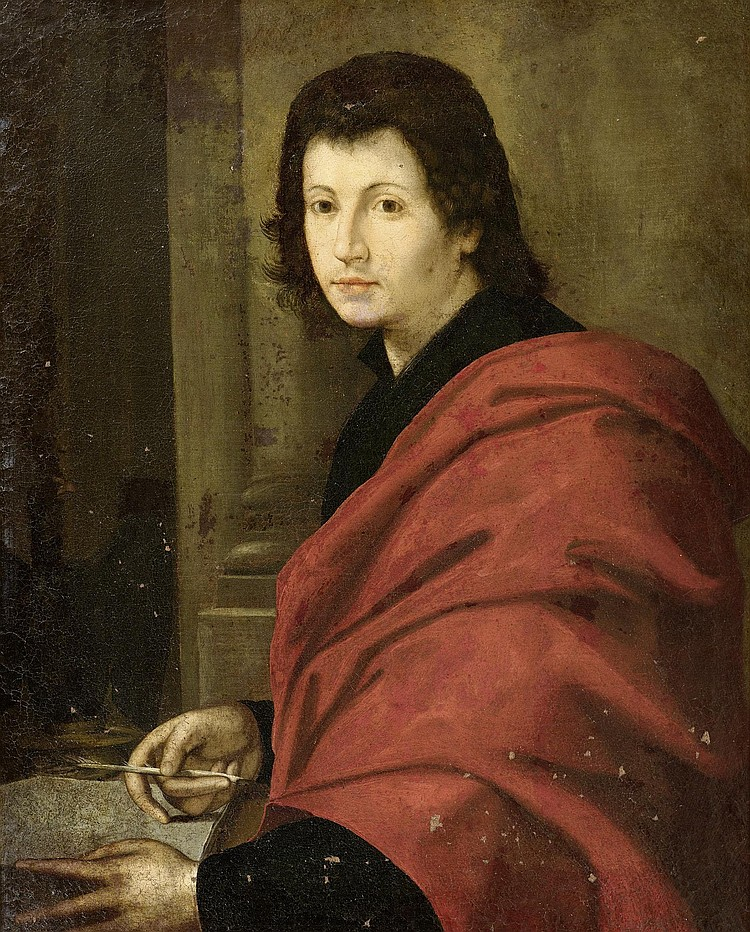
Portrait of Man Writing

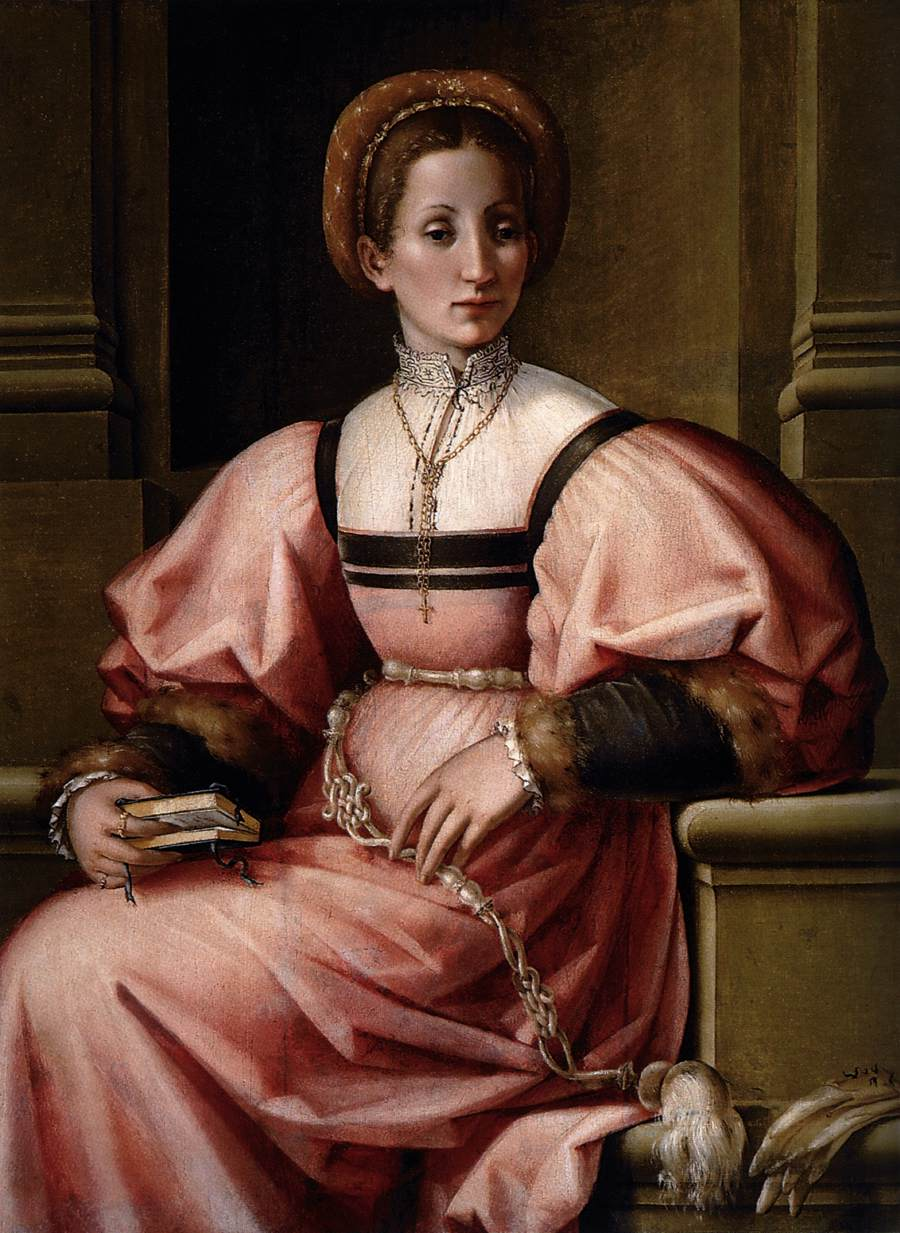
Portrait of Lady
