= Domenico Udine Nani =

Italian painter

Domenico Udine Nani, also known as Domenic Nani da Udine (1784–1850), was an Italian painter, originally from the Region of Trento and active in a Neoclassical style.

== Biography ==
He was born in Rovereto and trained at the Academy of Fine Arts of Florence, to where he moved in 1802. He died in Florence.

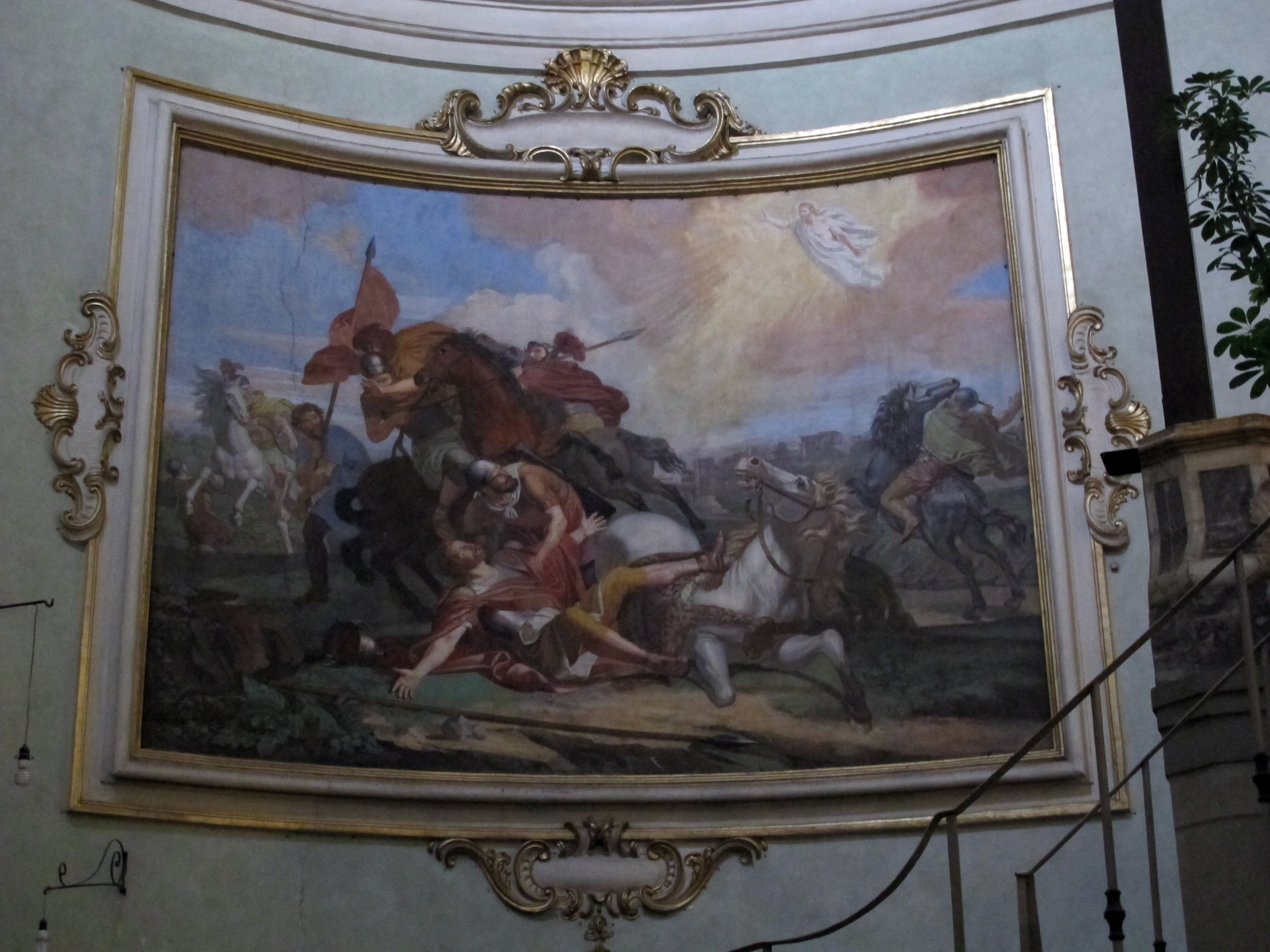
Conversion of St Paul in choir of San Paolino, Florence

He painted history and mythologic themes, winning the premio triennale in Rome in 1816 with a painting depicting Theseus leads back to Oedipus the two daughters taken by Creon. In 1821, he participated in the decoration of the Camera Rossa of the Palazzo Borghese, with frescoes depicting Venus intervenes with Mars in favor of the Thebans.

After he moved back to Florence, he painted frescoes in the choir of the church of San Paolino. He also participated in the decoration of the Villa di Poggio Imperiale with frescoes depicting the Story of Achilles, with landscapes by Giorgio Angiolini. He helped Leopoldo Cicognara with drawings of famous sculptures for his Storia della scultura.

By the 1820s, he had returned to the region of Trento, and he painted the altarpiece of the Duomo of Trento. He began painting devotional subjects in the northern provinces, in Arco, Rovereto and other sites. He painted a canvas depicting the Murder of Archimedes (1815) now at the Museo Civico of Rovereto. He painted a canvas depicting an Apparition of Madonna to Shepherds for the parish church of San Maurizio in Campodenno. He also contributed a design for an engraving of Pope Pius VII Enters Rome On Morning Of June 7, 1815.
