= Margherita Galeotti =

Italian pianist and composer

Margherita Galeotti (1867 – after 1912) was an Italian pianist and composer. She was born in Mauern, Bavaria, and studied piano and composition with Giuseppe Buonamici in Florence and Giuseppe Martucci in Bologna. After completing her studies, she performed as a concert pianist in Europe.

== Works ==
Galeotti composed works for voice, piano, violin and cello. Selected compositions include:

- Piano Trio in D minor (1912)
- Violin Sonata
