= Vescovo =

Vescovo is an Italian surname. Notable people with the surname include:

- Camillo Vescovo (born 1960), Italian ski mountaineer
- Rob Vescovo (born 1977), American politician
- Victor Vescovo (born 1966), American financier and undersea explorer
