= San Paolino, Florence =

Church building in Florence, Italy

Coordinates: 43.7727°N 11.2477°E

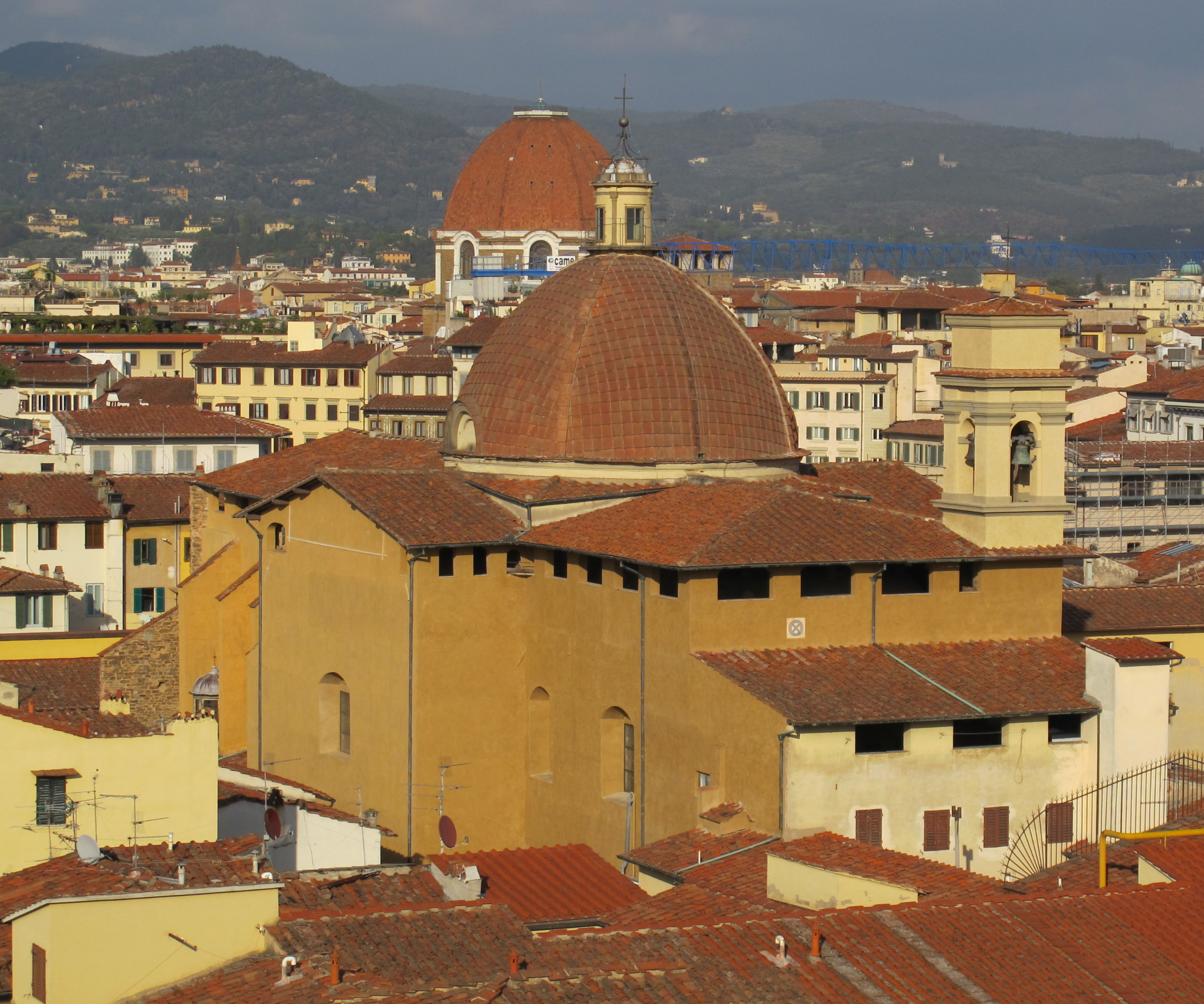
San Paolino

San Paolo Apostolo, more commonly known as San Paolino, is a Romanesque-style, Roman Catholic church and convent located in Via di S. Paolino #8, in central Florence, region of Tuscany, Italy. The church is near the Church of the Ognissanti.

== History ==
A church at the site was putatively located here by the 4th century, and dedicated to the Conversion of St Paul. It was originally located outside the Carolingian walls, and facing the former Decumanus maximus, now mainly Via Tornabuoni. A church replaced the chapel between the 10th and 11th centuries, and this was refurbished in an early Gothic-style by the 13th century. By 1208, the church at the site was called San Paolino to distinguish it from the church of San Paolo in the nearby Ospedale dei Convalescenti. By 1250, it was a collegiate church, and officiated during 1217-1221 by Dominican friars from Santa Maria Novella.

The church exteriors remained unfinished with a single portal and oculus in the façade. Under Pope Leo X, the collegiate church was suppressed, and it became a parish church. The façade has coats of arms of the Pope, and the Cardinal Giulio di Giuliano de' Medici, Archbishop of Florence and future pope Clement VII.

In 1529, it was staffed by the Franciscan Observant Minorites. In 1618, it was transferred to the Discalced Carmelite order, with the rights to found a convent. In 1621–1622, the interior of the church was refurbished. A major reconstruction took place in 1667, when it was decided the church was to be rotated 90 degrees from the prior orientation, under the guidance of the architect Giovan Battista Balatri. The rebuilt church had a single nave with four chapels at each side and a dome. Work was completed in 1693 with contributions by Maestro Francesco Masini for the nave and Messer Bastiano Messeri for the dome. The interior decoration was baroque in character.

After the suppression of the Carmelite order in 1810, the church was property of the government.

An Guide to Florence in 1669 noted the church had the following works:

- Martyrdom of Saint Cecilia, by Baldassare Franceschini
- Annunciation, attributed to Fra Angelico
- Holy Family, by Ignazio Hugford
- Agony of St Joseph, by Giovanni Domenico Ferretti
- Marriage of the Madonna, by Vincenzo Meucci
- Conversion and Beheading of St Paul, paintings in Choir by Domenico Udine Nani
- Rapture of St Paul in Choir by Francesco Curradi
- Frescoes in Sacristy, by Paolo Sarti
- Apparition of Christ before St John, by Ignazio Hugford
