= San Barnaba, Florence =

Roman Catholic church in Florence, Italy

Church of San Barnaba
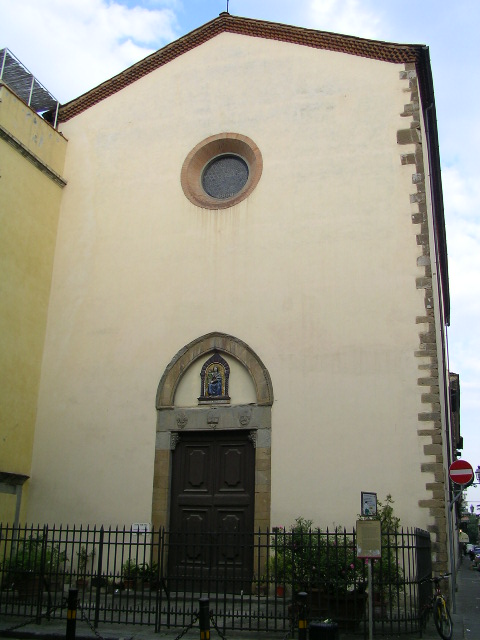
- Façade of San Barnaba

Religion
- Affiliation: Roman Catholic
- Province: Florence

Location
- Location: Florence, Italy
- Interactive map of Church of San Barnaba
- Coordinates: 43°46′40″N 11°15′14″E

Architecture
- Type: Church
- Groundbreaking: 15th century

The church of San Barnaba is a small Renaissance-style church in the center of Florence, at the corner of Via Panicale and Via Guelfa.

== Description ==
Initially built in the 14th century by the Chapter of St. Lawrence, in memory of the June 11, 1289 victory at the Battle of Campaldino of the Guelphs from Florence over Ghibelline opponents from Arezzo. The poet, Dante Alighieri is said to have fought with the Guelph cavalry. After 1356, the church was affiliated with the Augustinian order, housed in an adjacent convent. In the 16th century, the complex was granted to a Carmelite order, and the underwent rebuilding of the church, including the elaborate gilded wooden ceiling, completed in 1717 by Giovanni Vernaccini. The convent was suppressed and converted into apartments. The church is now part of the parish of San Lorenzo.

The rather plain façade has heraldic symbols of a red cross, eagle defeating a dragon, and the Florentine giglio (stylized iris), which are the symbols respectively of the people of Florence, the guelphs, and the city of Florence. The portal has a Giovanni Della Robbia Madonna made of terracota (1528-1529). The church contains paintings by Pier Francesco Foschi, Alessandro Allori, and Lorenzo di Bicci. An altarpiece of the Enthroned Madonna with Saints and Angels, known as the San Barnaba Altarpiece, circa 1487 by Sandro Botticelli, is now housed in the Uffizi Gallery.
