= Giuseppe Galeòtti =

Italian painter

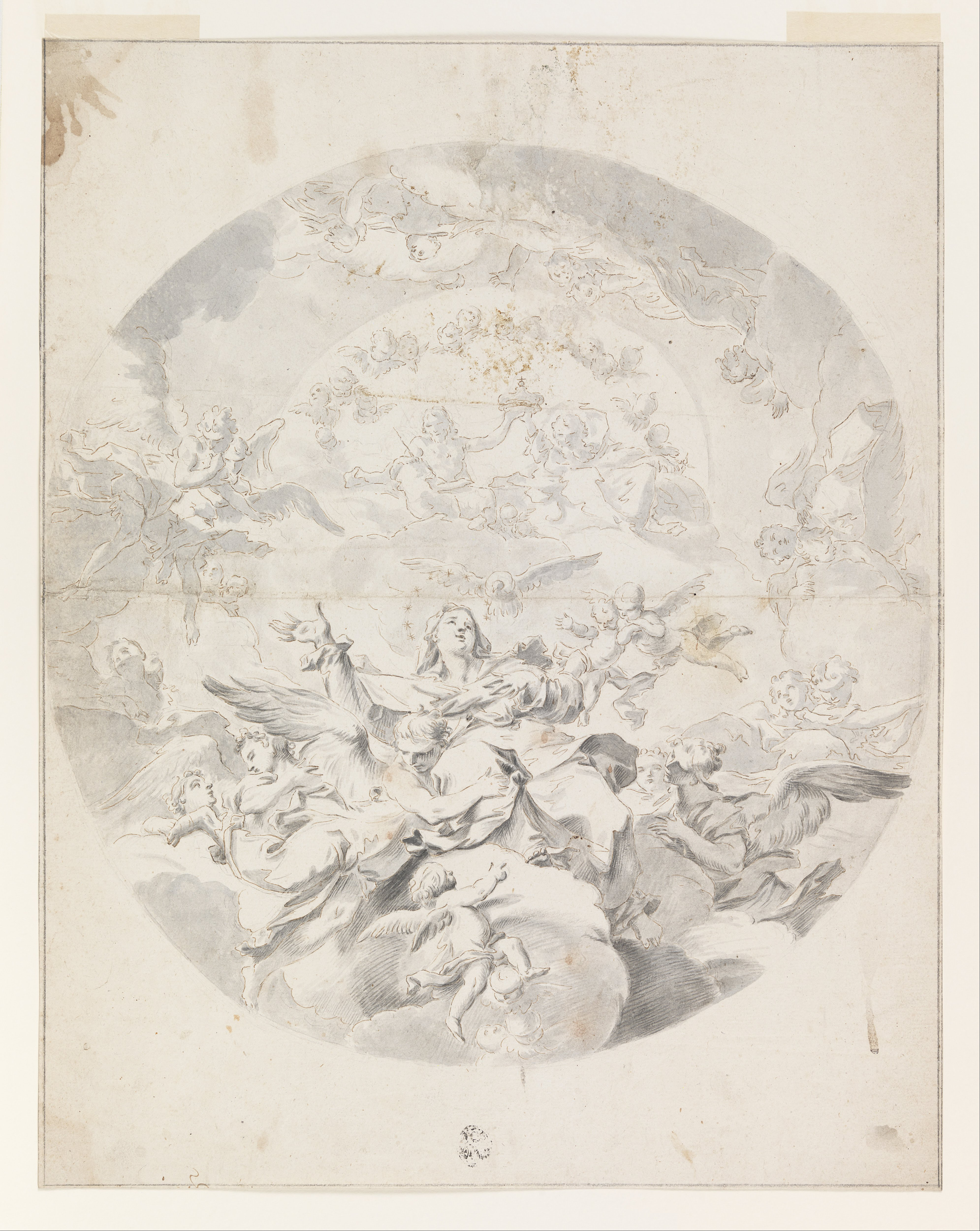
Ascension of the Virgin

Giuseppe Galeòtti (1708–1778) was an Italian painter, active in a Baroque style, mainly in the Republic of Genoa.

== Biography ==
He was born in Florence, to the peripatetic Baroque painter Sebastiano Galeòtti, he moved to Bologna, to train under Marcantonio Franceschini, and painted mainly figures and history painting.

Galeòtti returned to Liguria, where he was very active. In collaboration with Giovanni Battista Natali, he painted frescoes in the Palazzo Dosi-Magnavacca in Pontremoli, depicting Triumph of the Dosi Family in a ceiling and wall fresco of Neptune and Galatea.

For the church of Giovanni Battista in Chiavari, he painted a canvas depicting The Discovery of the Cross. For the church of San Giovanni Battista in Genoa, he painted a Comparsa della Madonna in collaboration with Giovanni Andrea Carlone. He painted a San Carlo Borromeo for Santa Maria Maddalena in Genoa.

For the church of the Annuziata of Savona, Galeòtti painted the figures in a ceiling fresco with quadratura by Giovanni Battista Natali. Also for the Church of San Filippo Neri in Savona, which later became the church of the Scuole Pie, he painted the main altarpiece with San Filippo Neri and the Virgin. He painted an Annunciation for the Parish church of Spotorno. Galeòtti died in 1778 in Genoa.
