= Sebastiano Galeotti =

Italian painter (1656–1746)

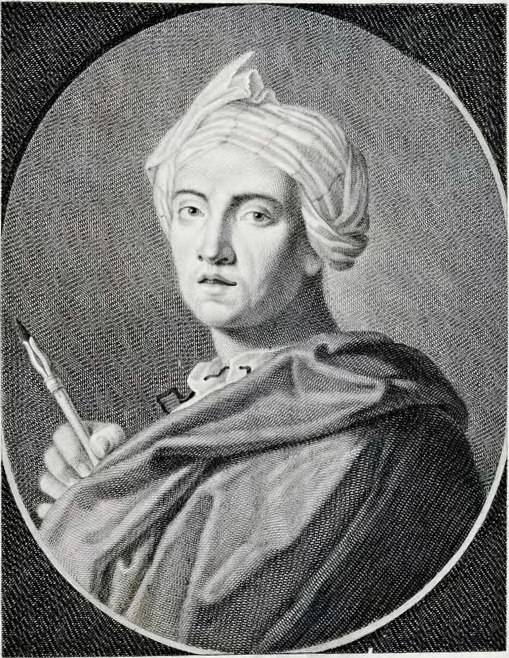
- Born: 22 December 1675; Florence
- Died: 1746 (aged 70–71); Vico
- Occupation: Painter
- Children: Giuseppe Galeòtti, Giovanni Battista Galeotti

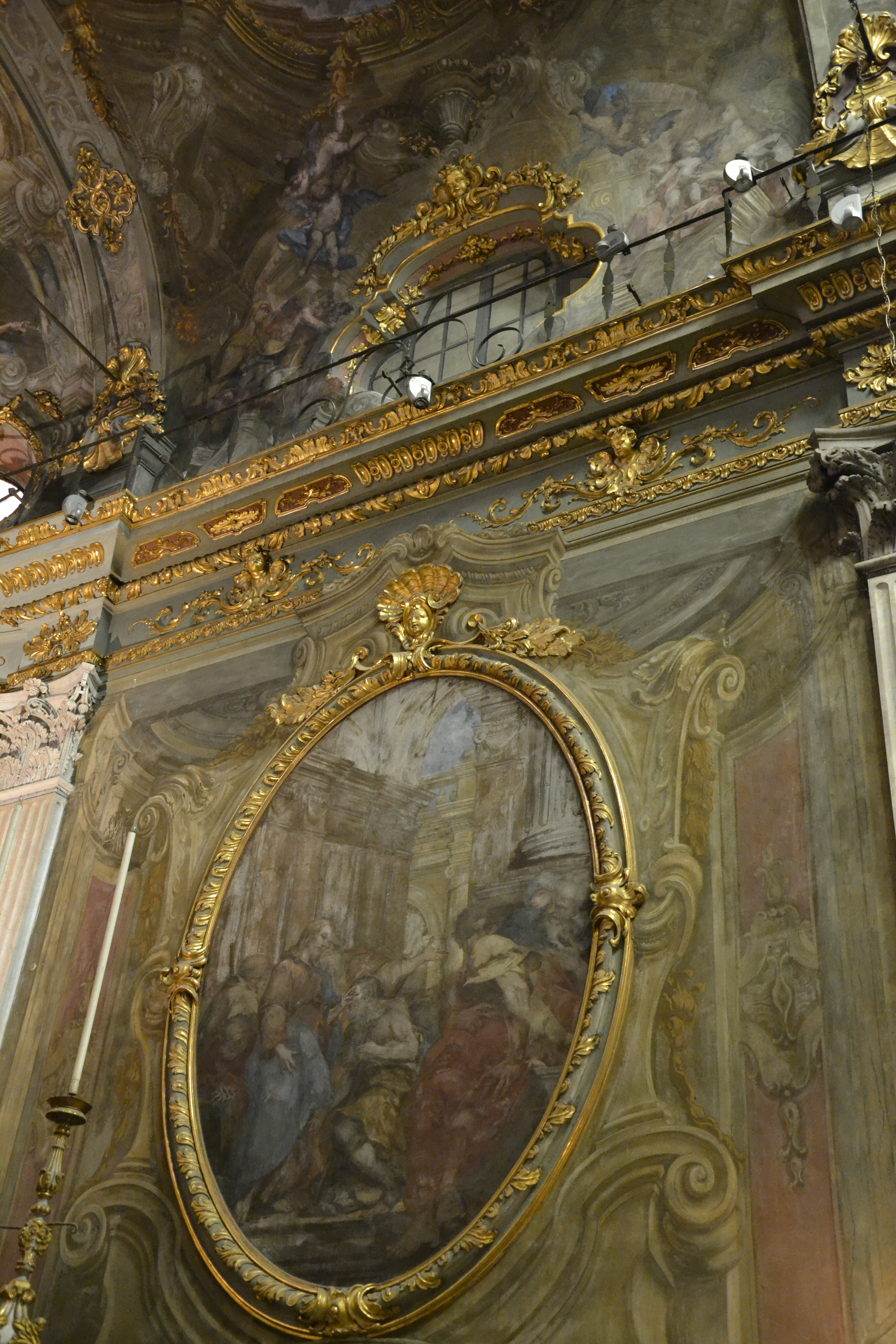
Chiesa di Santa Maria Maddalena (Genova) fresco by Sebastiano Galeotti

Sebastiano Galeotti (1656–1746) was a peripatetic Italian painter of the late-Baroque period, active in Florence, Genoa, Parma, Piacenza, Codogno, Lodi, Cremona, Milan, Vicenza, Bergamo, and Turin.

Born in Florence, Grand Duchy of Tuscany, he was a pupil of the painter Alessandro Gherardini, Felice Torelli, and Giovanni Gioseffo dal Sole. He collaborated with Giovanni Domenico Ferretti or Francesco Natali of Cremona in some projects, and among his pupils were Vincenzo Meucci.

He painted with Natali in the Oratory of Santa Maria delle Grazie, Parma.

He helped decorate with frescoes the rooms of the Farnese Rocca in Sala Baganza. Died in Mondovì working for the House of Savoy. He decorated the church of the Magdalen in Genoa. In Turin, he was appointed director of the Academy, the precursor of the Accademia Albertina.

His son Giuseppe was active in Liguria as a painter.
