= Evangelical Methodist Church of Florence =

Church in Florence, Italy

Coordinates: 43.460509°N 11.153438°E

The Evangelical Methodist Church of Florence is an Italian Methodist church located on via de' Benci #9 of Florence, region of Tuscany, Italy. The congregation occupies the former Roman Catholic church of San Jacopo tra i Fossi, founded in the 12th century. It was originally staffed by Vallombrosian monks of San Salvi, but by 1543 it was transferred to the Augustinian order that had remained faithful to Cosimo I. The present church was rebuilt in the 17th century. The adjacent convent and church were suppressed in 1808. The church was allocated in 1874 to the Scottish missionary John R. MacDougall. As of 2013, the Methodist Church is currently cared for by the pastor of the Waldensian Church of Florence, and the Tuscany Methodist Circuit.

The interior has an elaborately stuccoed ceiling with a canvas by Alessandro Gherardini depicting the Triumph of Faith with St Augustine in Ecstasy (circa 1690).
