= San Giuseppe, Florence =

Church building in Florence, Italy

Coordinates: 43°46′5.04″N 11°15′55.89″E

Church of San Giuseppe
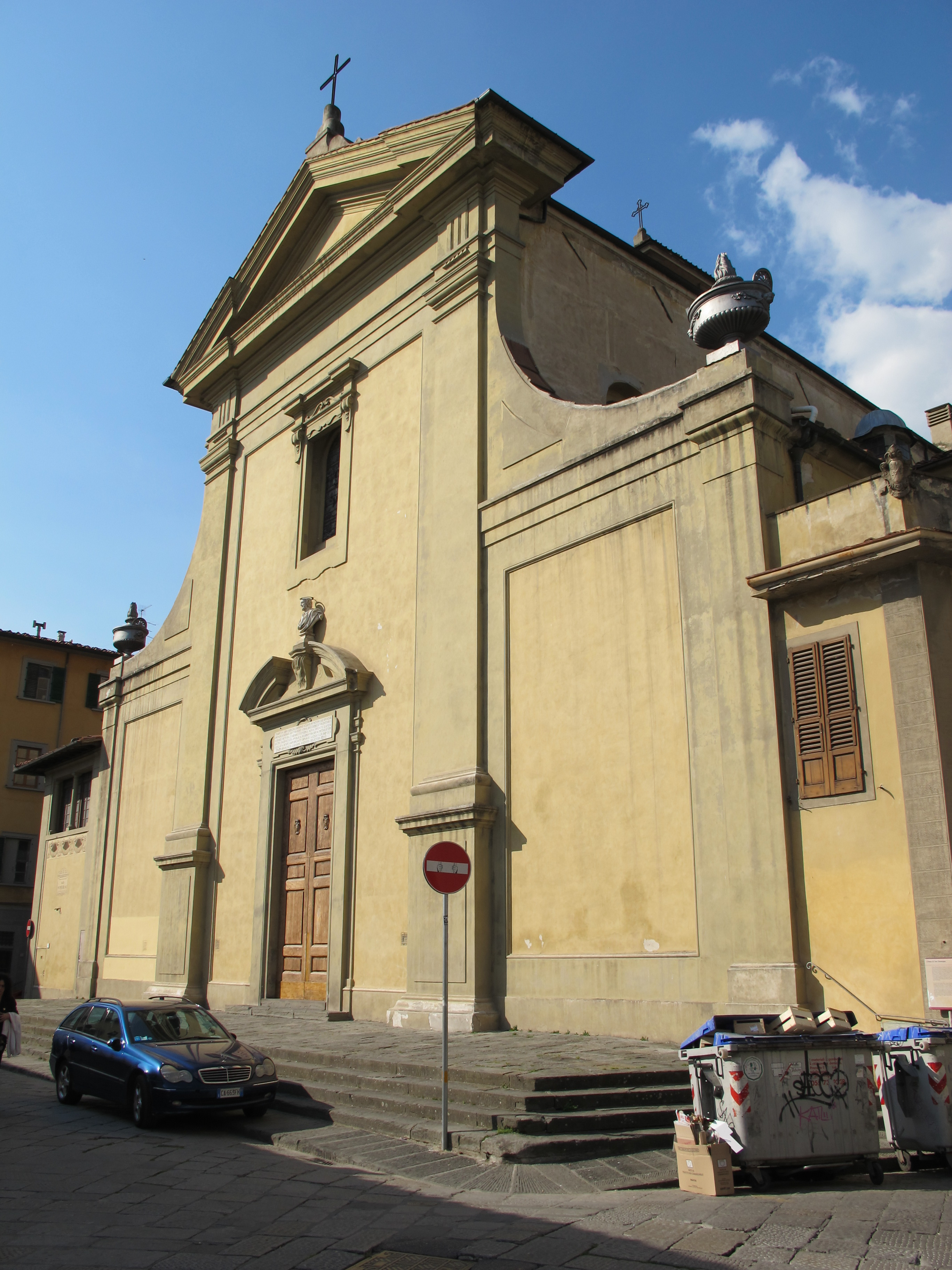
- Façade of San Giuseppe

Religion
- Affiliation: Roman Catholic
- Province: Florence
- Year consecrated: 1519

Location
- Location: Florence, Italy
- Interactive map of Church of San Giuseppe

Architecture
- Architect: Baccio d'Agnolo
- Type: Church
- Style: Renaissance and Baroque
- Completed: 1759

San Giuseppe is a Baroque architecture, Roman Catholic church building located on Via San Giuseppe, near Piazza Santa Croce, in central Florence, region of Tuscany, Italy, and is one of two churches and an oratory in the city dedicated to Saint Joseph.

== History ==
The church was built on a site that once held the oratory of the Confraternity of St. Joseph, and the present church was designed by Baccio d'Agnolo. In 1583, the complex was deeded to the Minims of Saint Francis of Paola. A new façade was completed in 1759. When the Minim order was suppressed in 1784, the convent was put to new uses.

== Interior ==
In 1752, the interior was frescoed by Sigismondo Betti and Pietro Anderlini. The otherwise Baroque decoration of the interior conserves a medieval painted crucifix by Lorenzo Monaco, with which the Battuti Neri or black hooded penitents from this church, accompanied those condemned to death to the scaffold outside of the city gate called Porta alla Giustizia. The interior also contains two canvases by Santi di Tito: a Nativity and St Francesco di Paola heals the Sick.

== Gallery ==
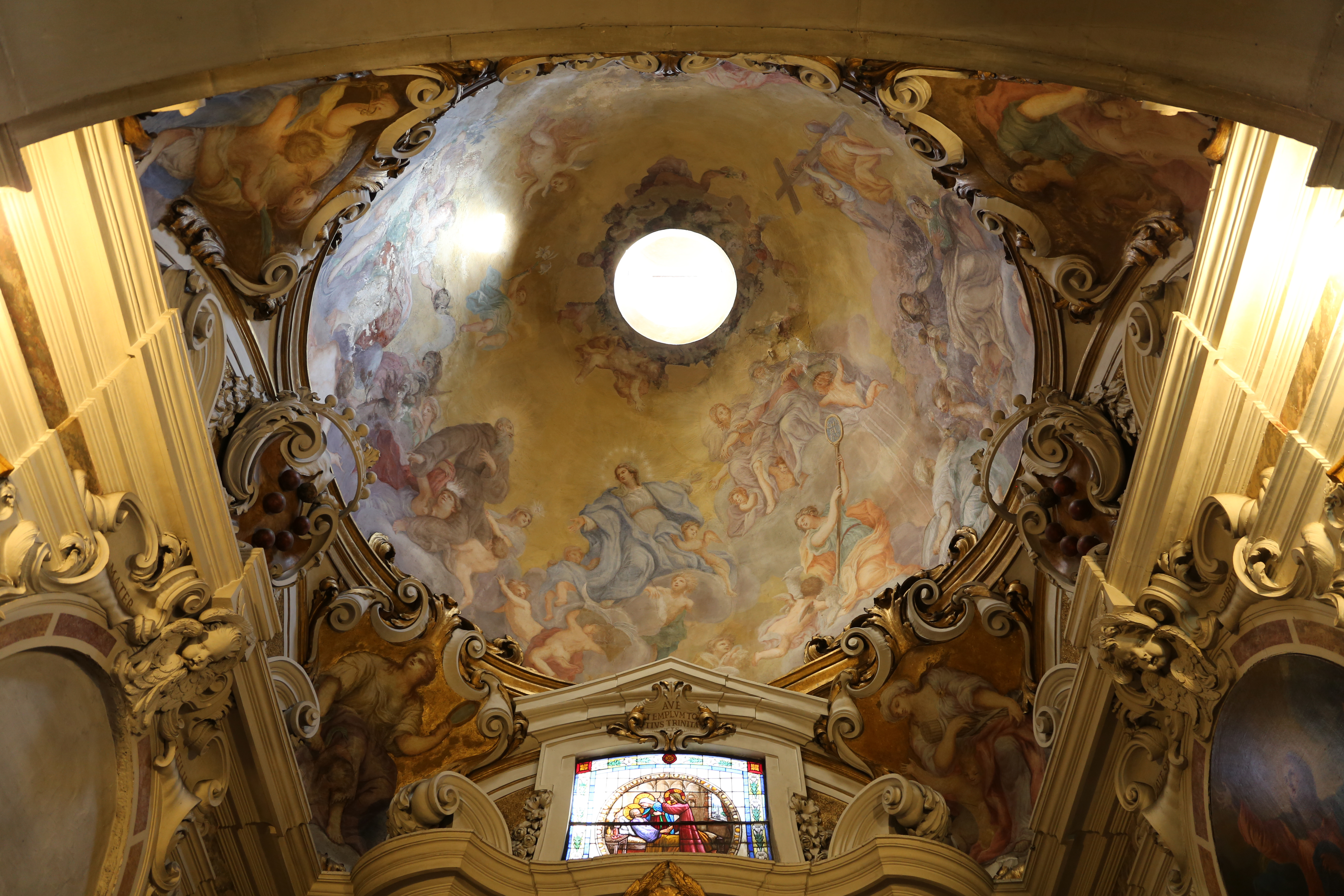
Frescoed Cupola by Atanasio Bimbacci from 2nd chapel on right

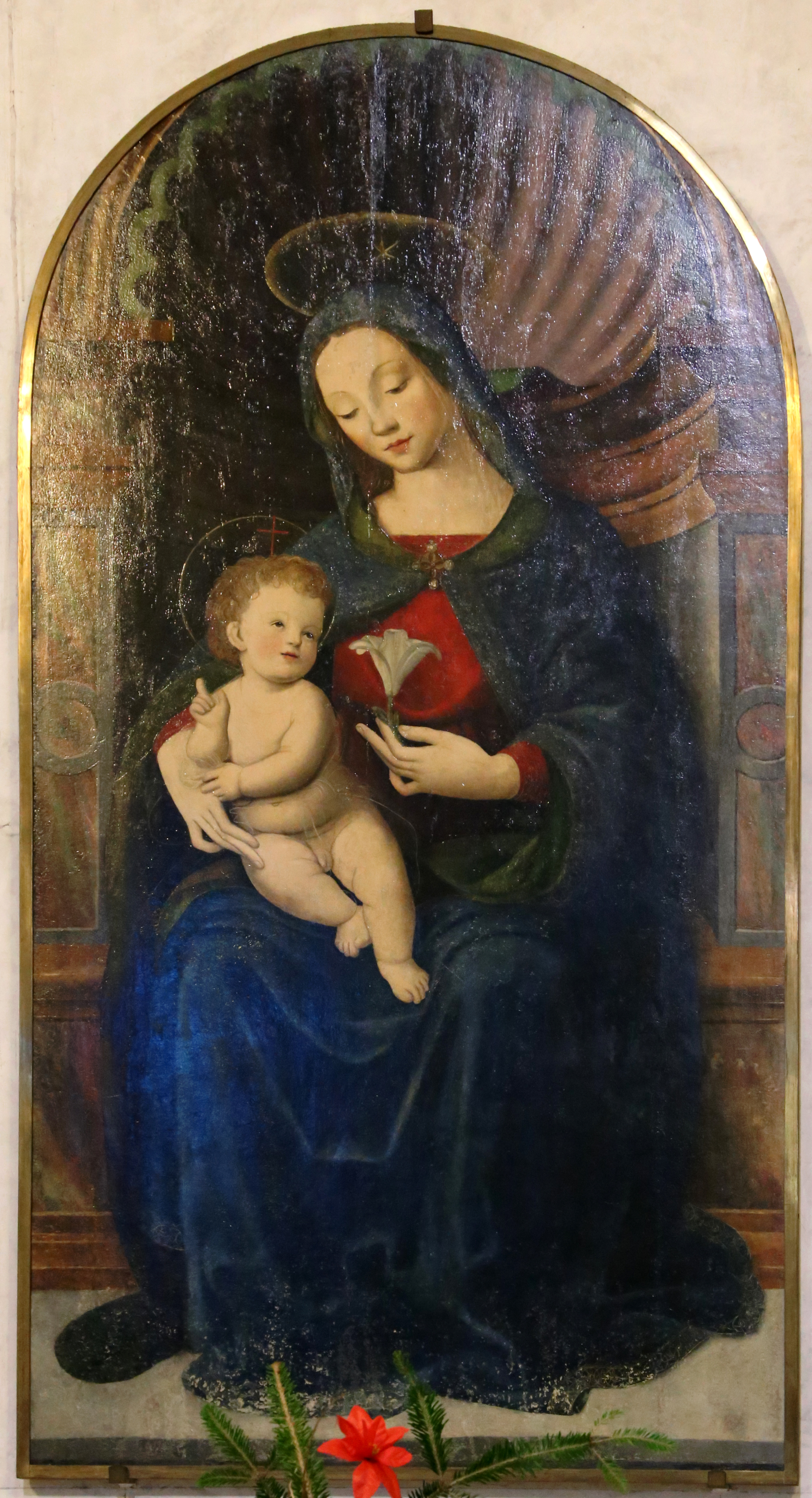
Madonna del Giglio by Raffaellino del Garbo

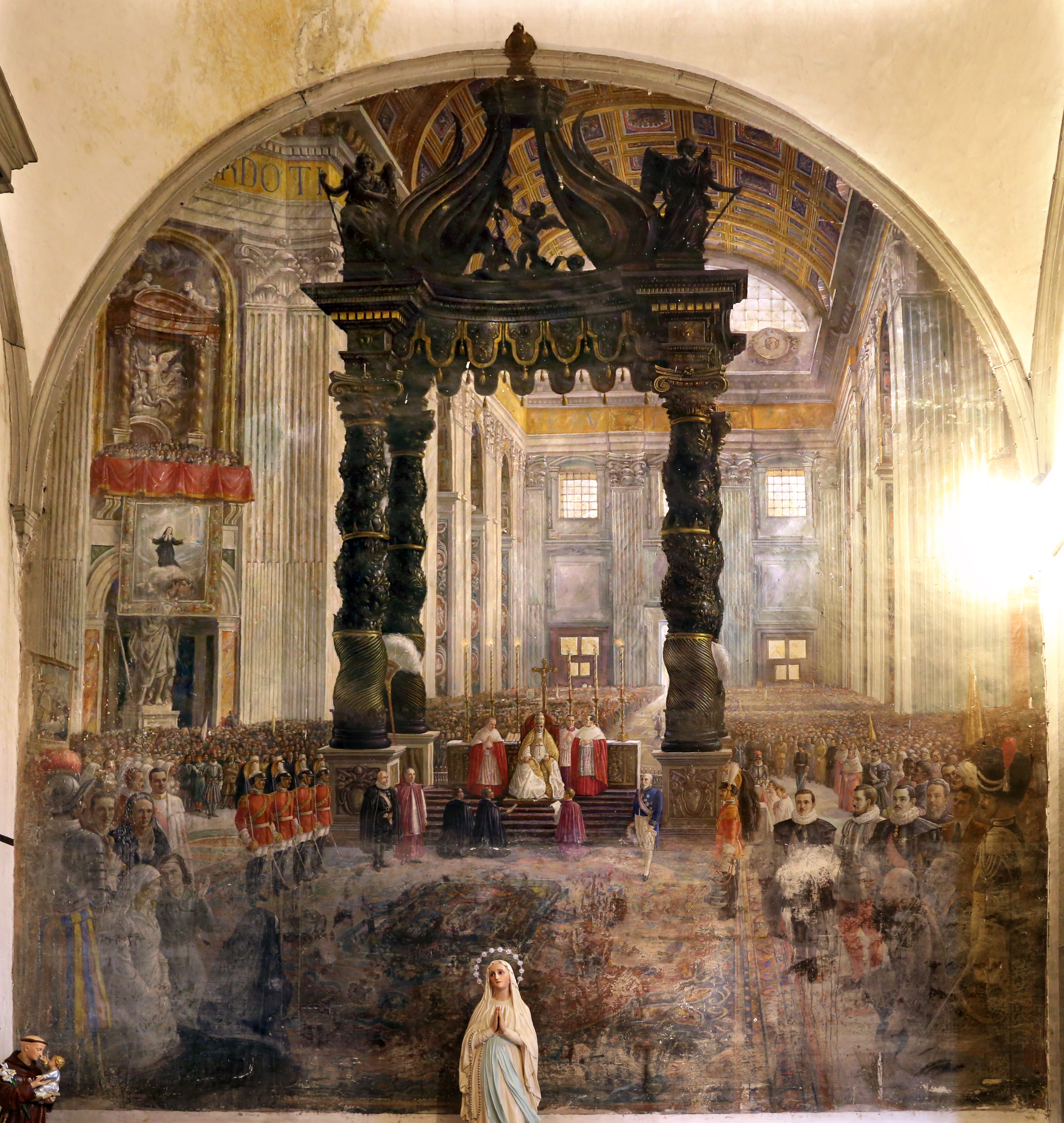
Fresco of Beatification of Bernardette di Lourdes (1930s), 1st chapel on left, damaged during 1966 flood

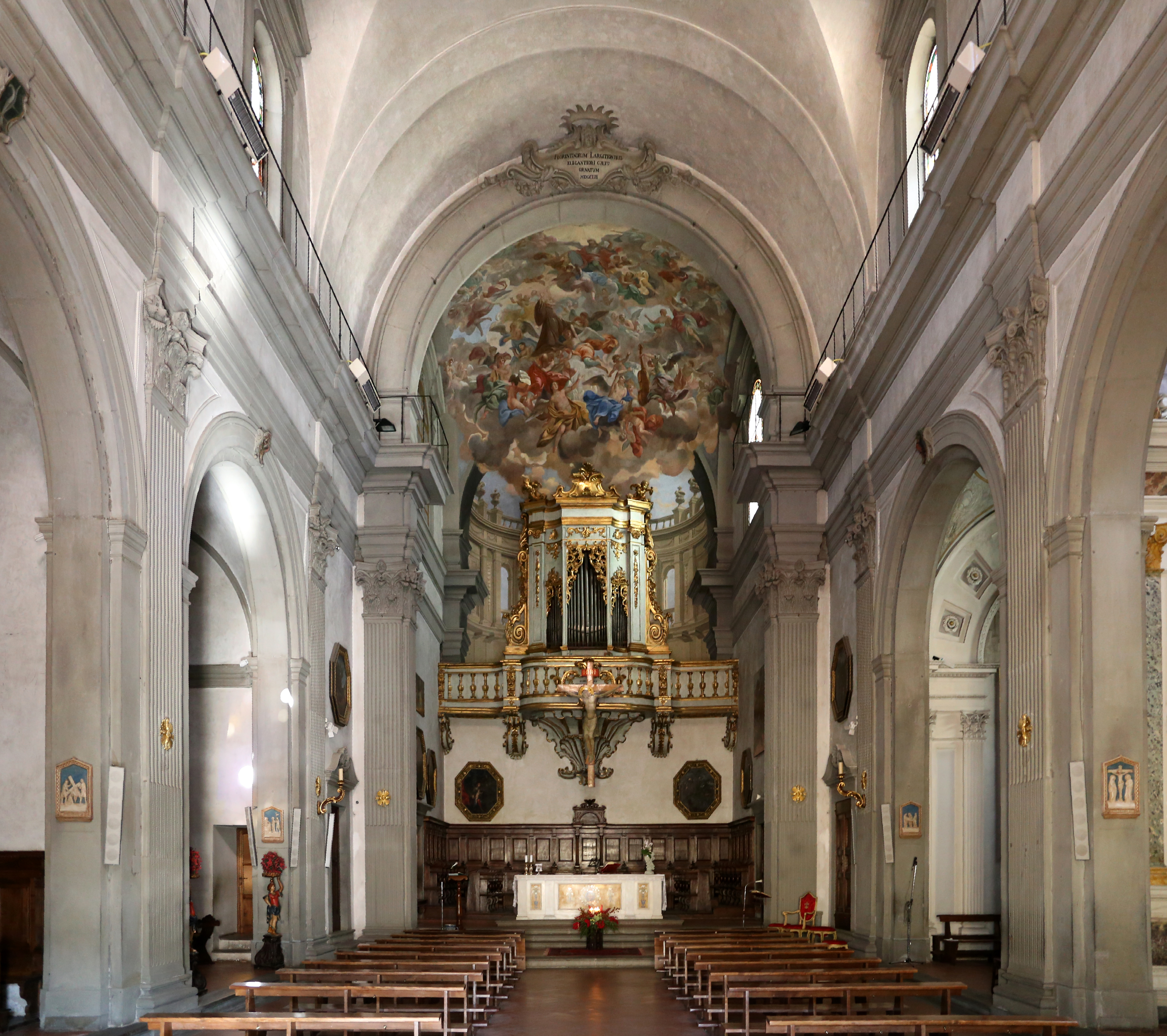
The interior

== Sources ==
- Derived from Italian Wikipedia entry
- Guide of Art in Italy
