= San Salvatore al Vescovo =

Church in Florence, Italy

Coordinates: 43°46′22.97″N 11°15′14.97″E

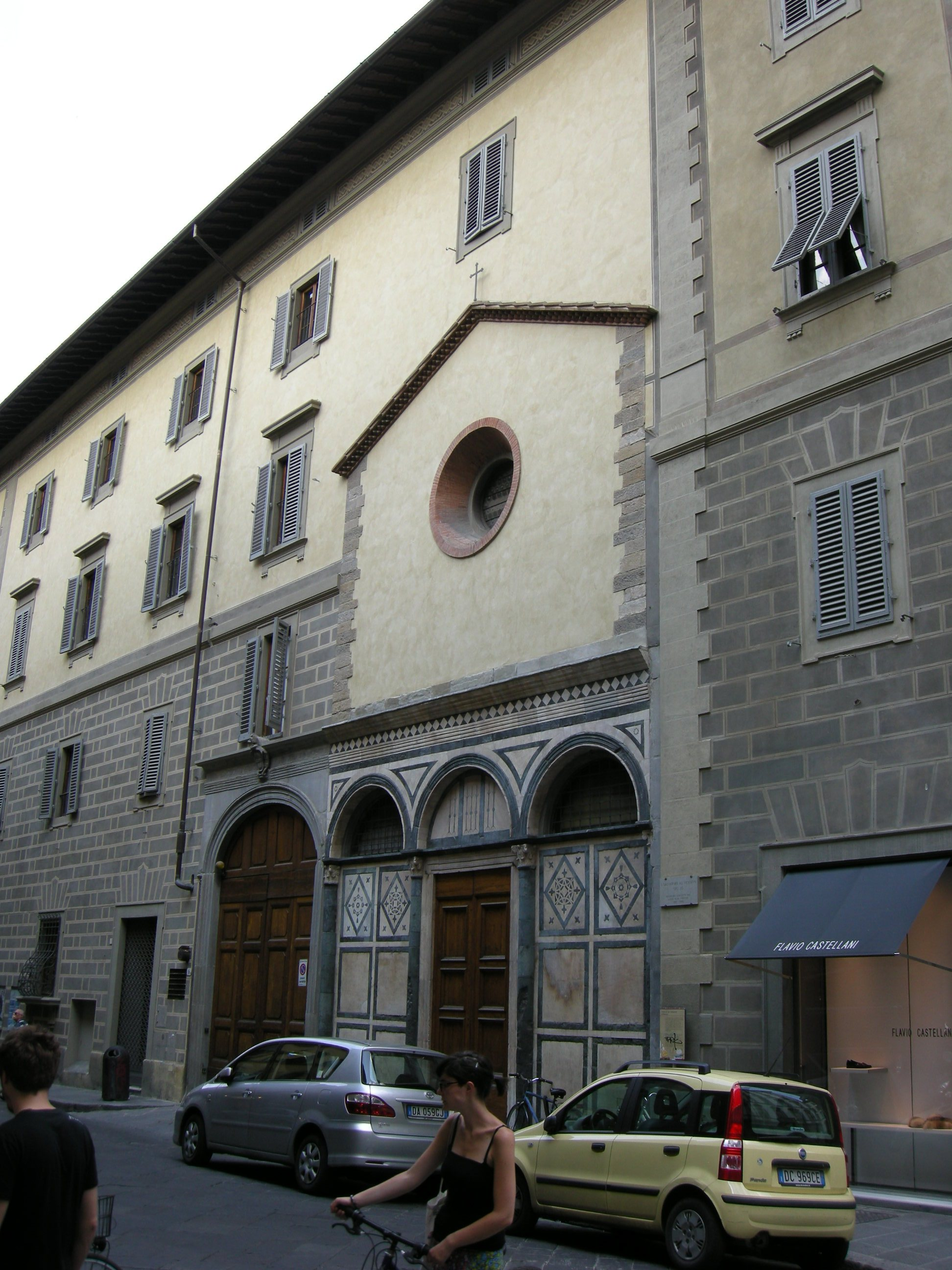
San Salvatore al Vescovo

San Salvatore al Vescovo is a church located in Florence, Italy.

It was first built in the 11th century and has had several subsequent modifications. The lower portion of the facade is built in a Romanesque architecture style with bi-colored marble decorations.

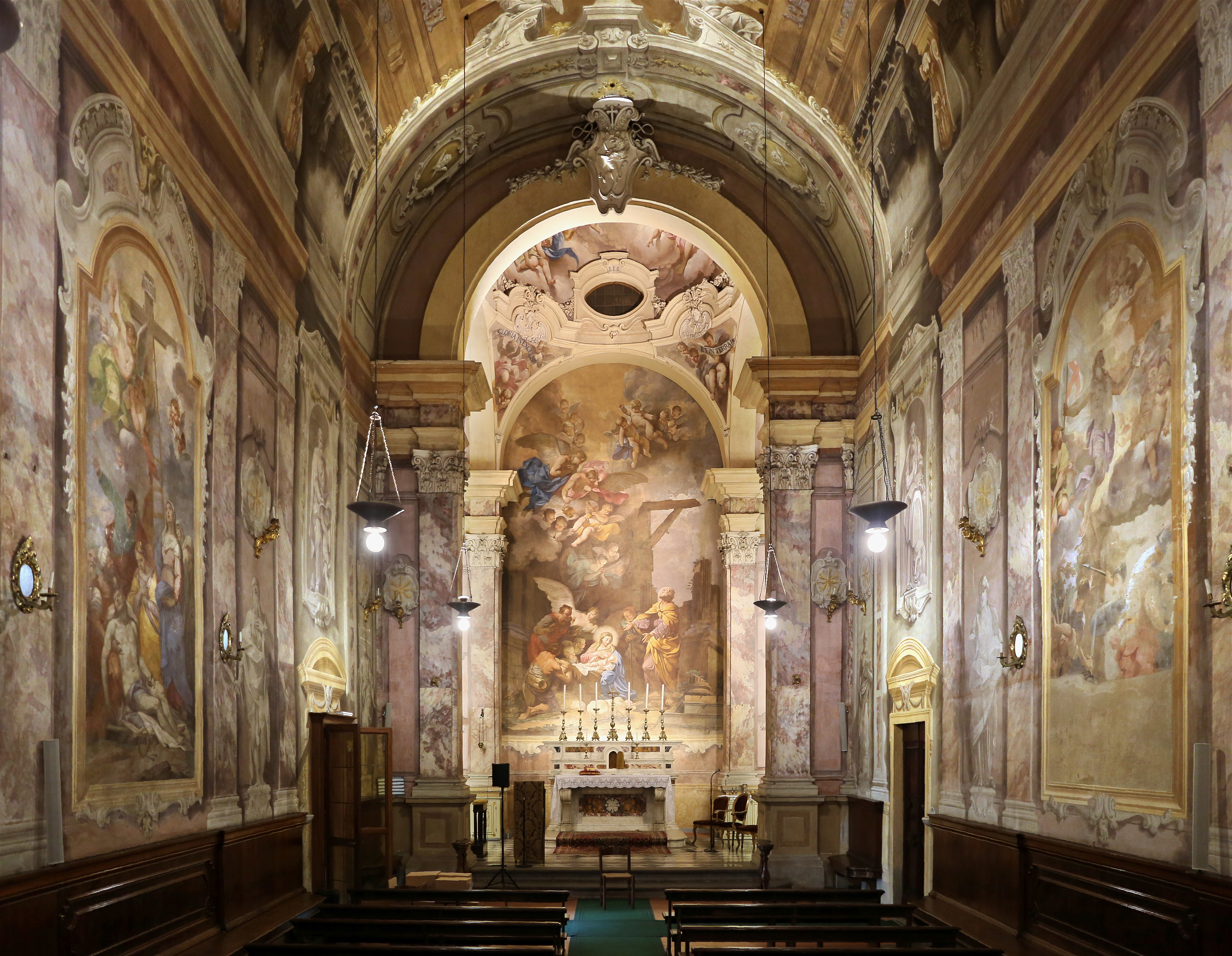
Interior

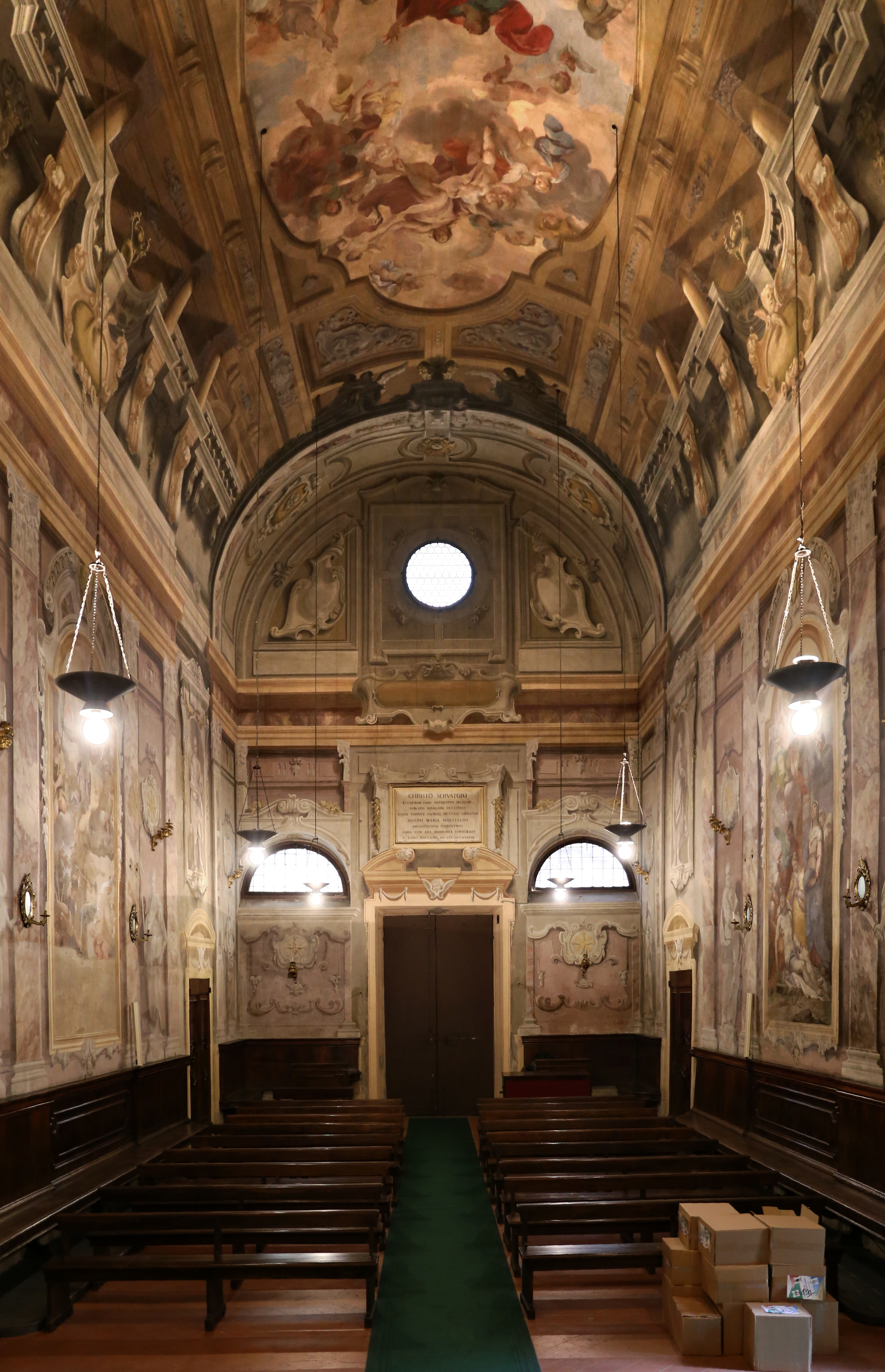
Interior

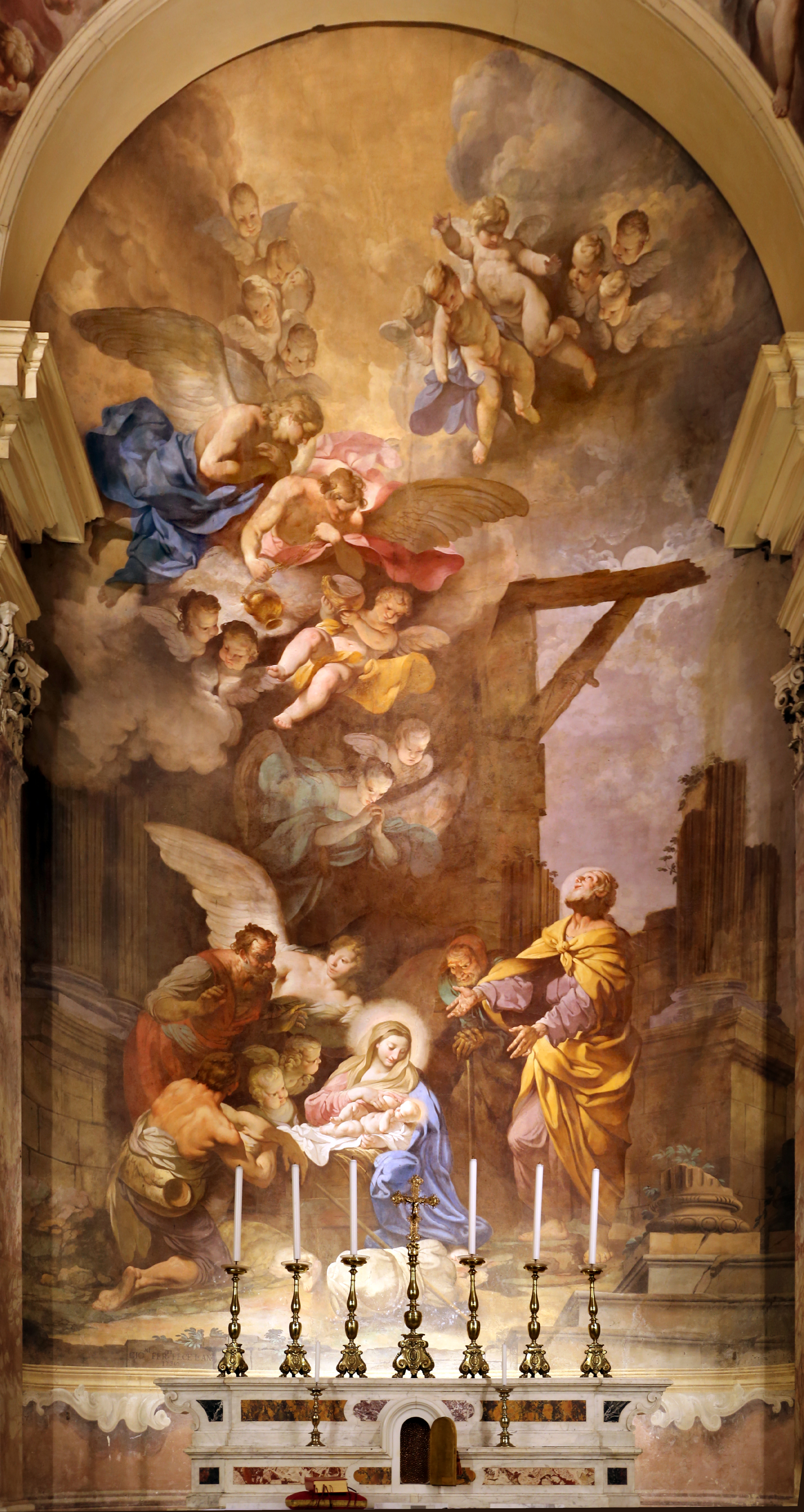
Gian Domenico Ferretti, Adorazione dei pastori, 1738

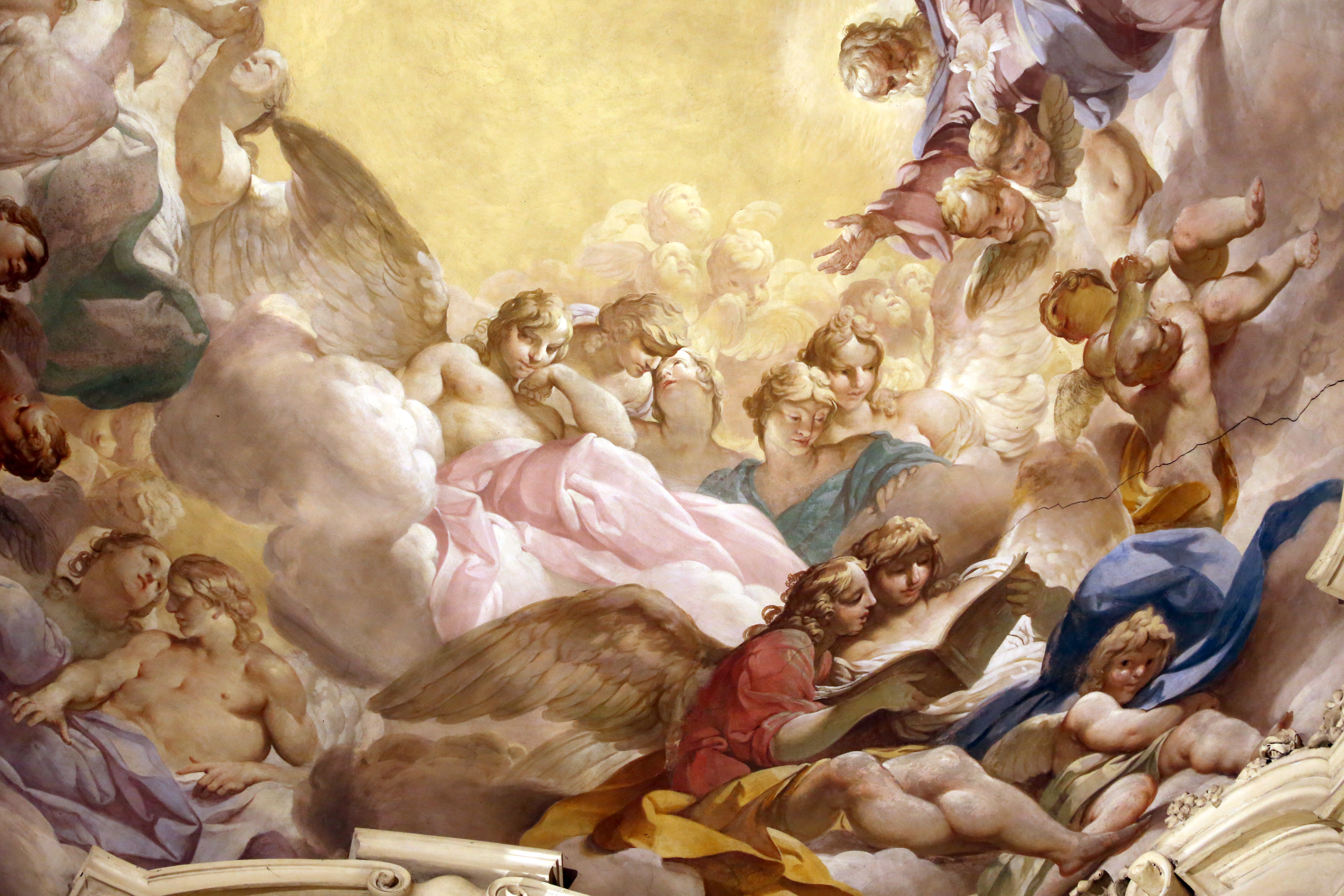
Gian Domenico Ferretti, affreschi della cupoletta del presbiterio

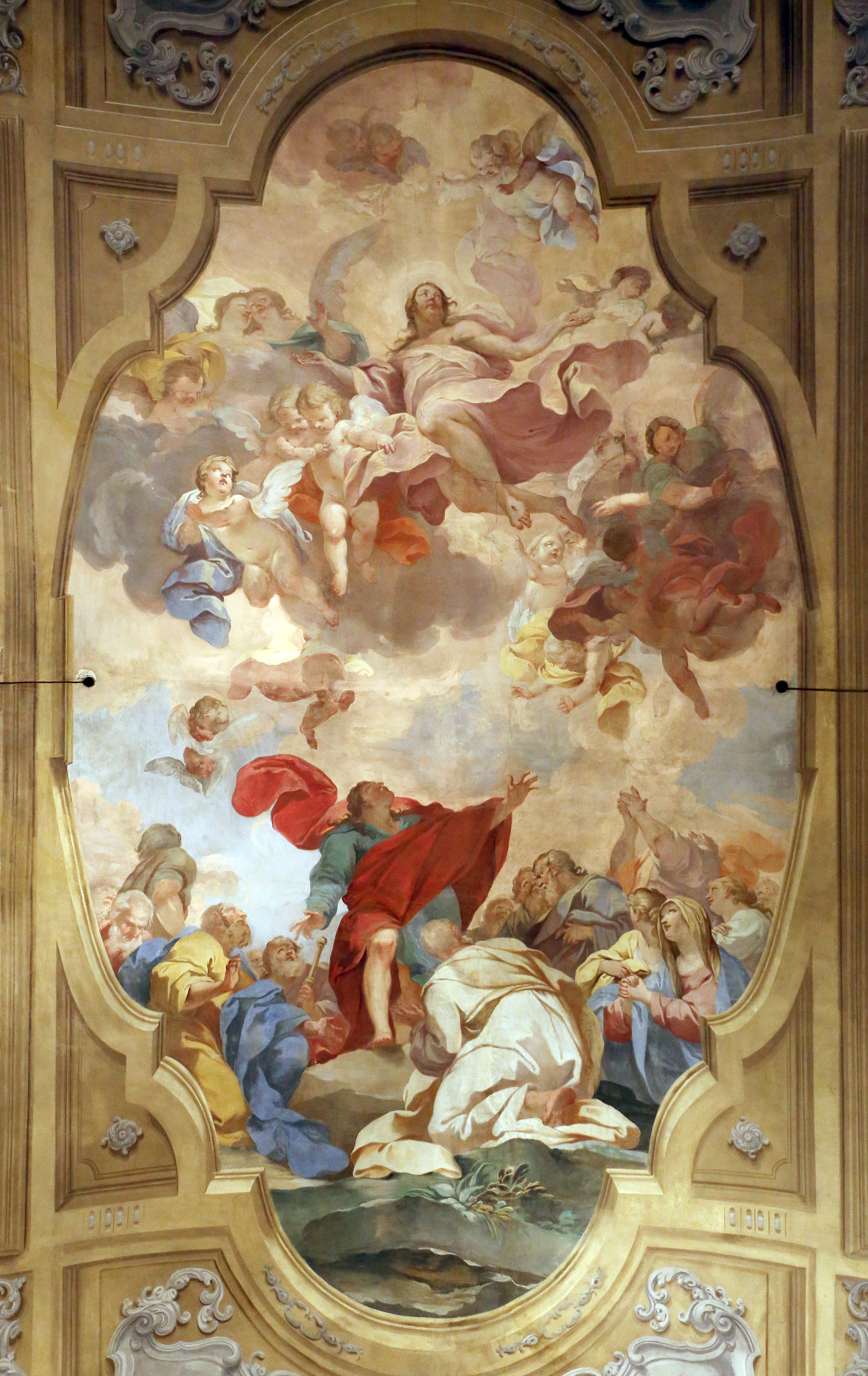
Vincenzo Meucci, Ascensione di Cristo
