= Vincenzo Meucci =

Italian painter (1694–1766)

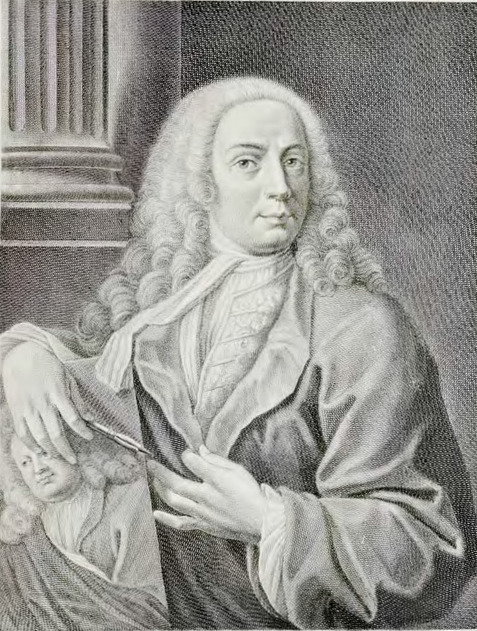
- Born: 1694
- Baptised: 6 April 1694
- Died: 7 November 1766 (aged 71–72); Florence
- Occupation: Painter

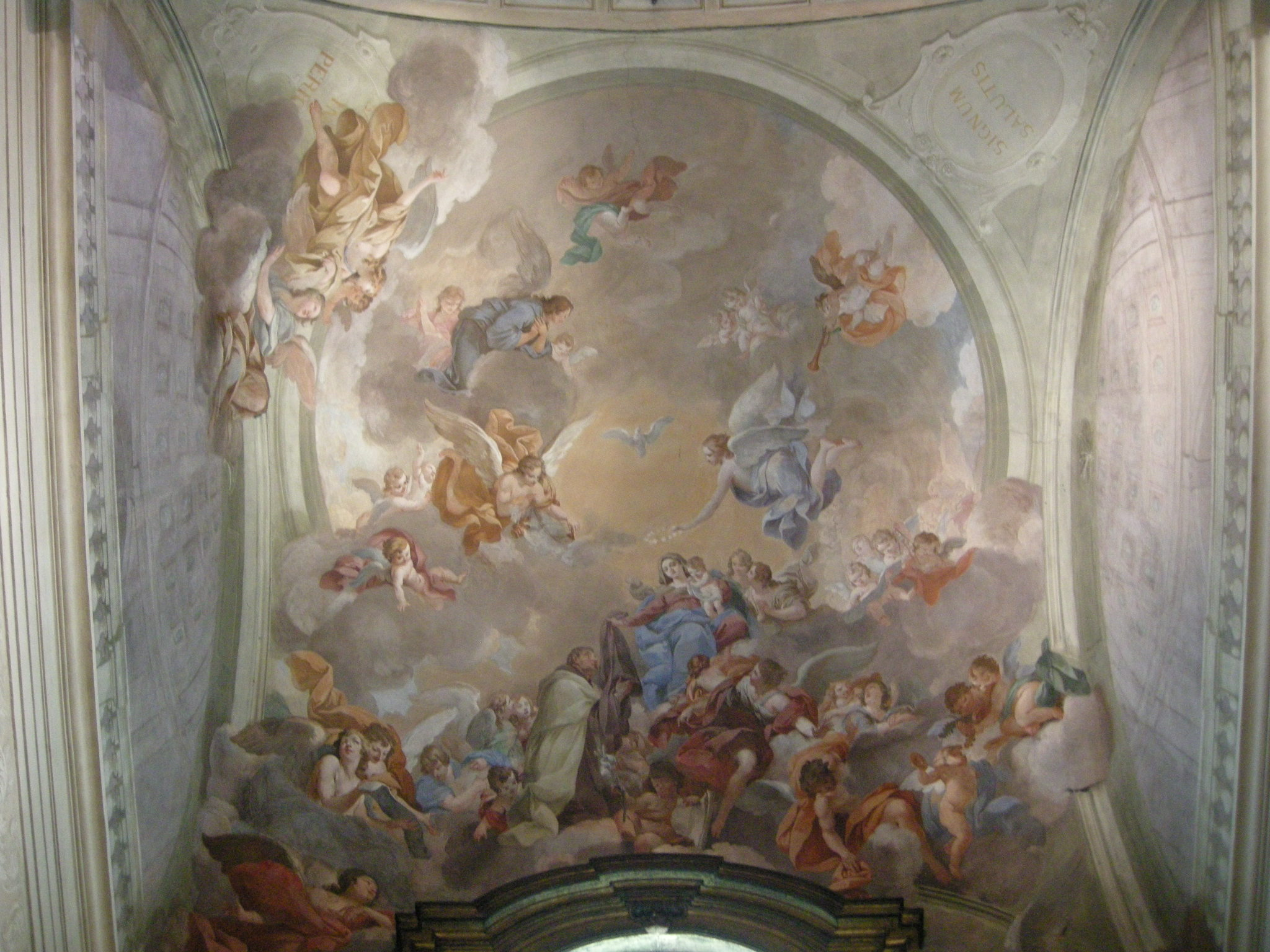
Fresco at Cappella Brancacci, Florence

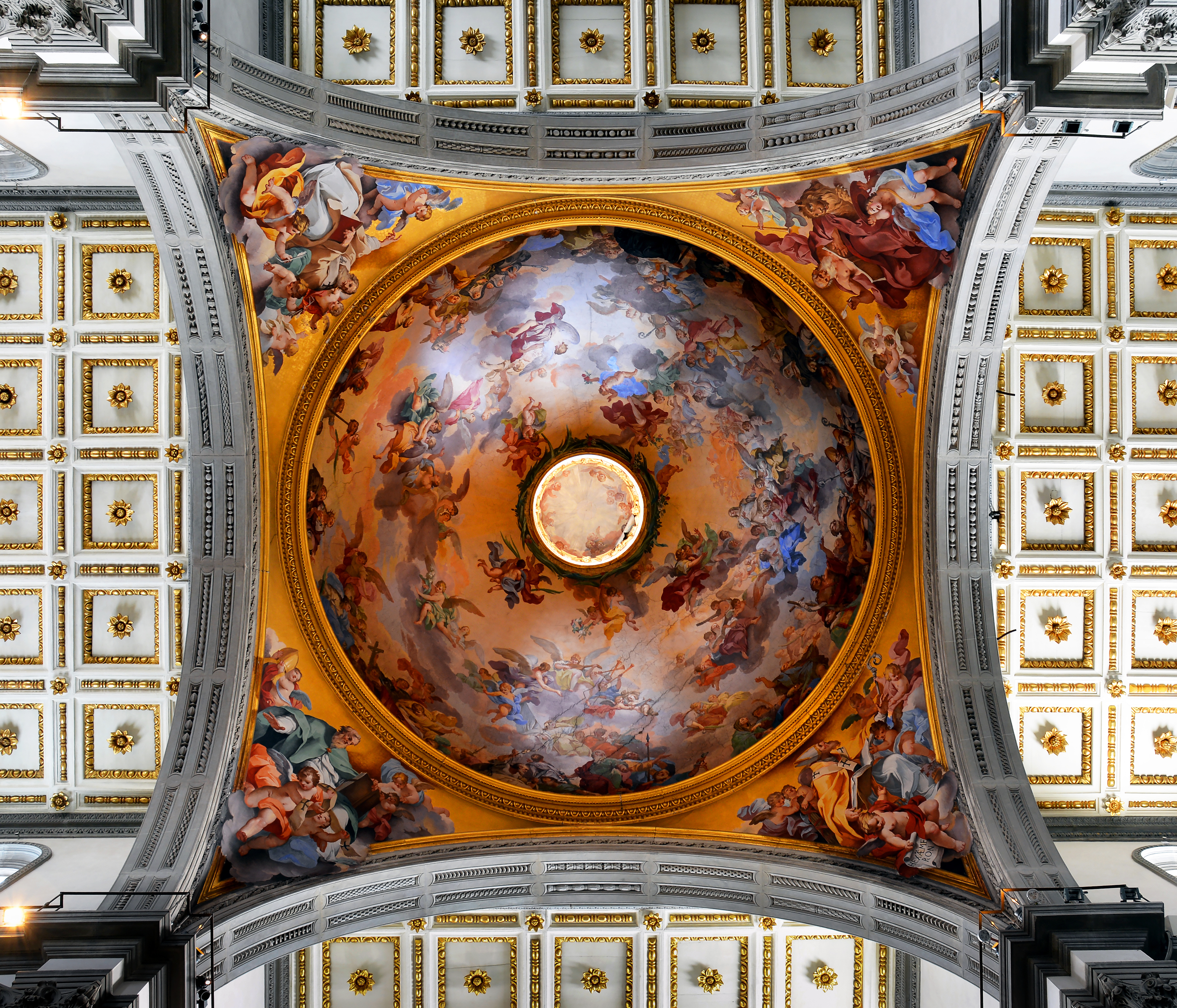
Fresco at San Lorenzo, Florence

Vincenzo Meucci (1694–1766) was an Italian painter of the late-Baroque period. Born in Florence. He was a pupil first of the painter Sebastiano Galeotti, then of Giovanni Gioseffo dal Sole in Bologna.

He was patronized by the Marchese Giovan Battista Salimbeni of Siena, as well as the cardinals Alessandro Chigi Zondadari and Neri Corsini. His masterpiece was a commission by Anna Maria Luisa de' Medici, the last Medici resident of the Pitti Palace, who contracted him to fresco the cupola of the Basilica di San Lorenzo di Firenze with the Glory of Florentine Saints (1742).

Among his pupils are Tommaso Gherardini.

== Selected works ==
- Frescoes for Chapel of San Mauro, Badia Fiorentina, Florence (1717)
- Madonna del Rosario, Santa Lucia alla Castellina, Sesto Fiorentino (1731)
- Frescoes for ceiling at the entrance of Ospedale di San Giovanni di Dio, Florence(1735)
- Frescoes for Palazzo Panciatichi, Florence (c. 1741)
- Marriage of Virgin San Paolino, Florence
- Altarpiece for church of Santa Maria Maggiore, Florence
- Ascension of Christ, frescoed on nave ceiling of San Salvatore al Vescovo, Florence
