= Dandini =

Dandini is an Italian surname. Notable people with the surname include:

- Cesare Dandini (1596–1657), Italian painter
- Girolamo Dandini (1509–1559), Italian Cardinal
- Girolamo Dandini (1554–1634), Italian Jesuit
- Ottaviano Dandini (?-1750), Italian painter and Jesuit
- Pietro Dandini (1646–1712), Italian painter
- Vincenzo Dandini (1607–1675), Italian painter

== See also ==
- Dandini (character), servant of Prince Charming in the story of Cinderella
