= 1659 in art =

Events from the year 1659 in art.

== Events ==
- Frescoes at the Quirinal Palace in Rome are completed by Pietro da Cortona and his team of artists.

== Paintings ==
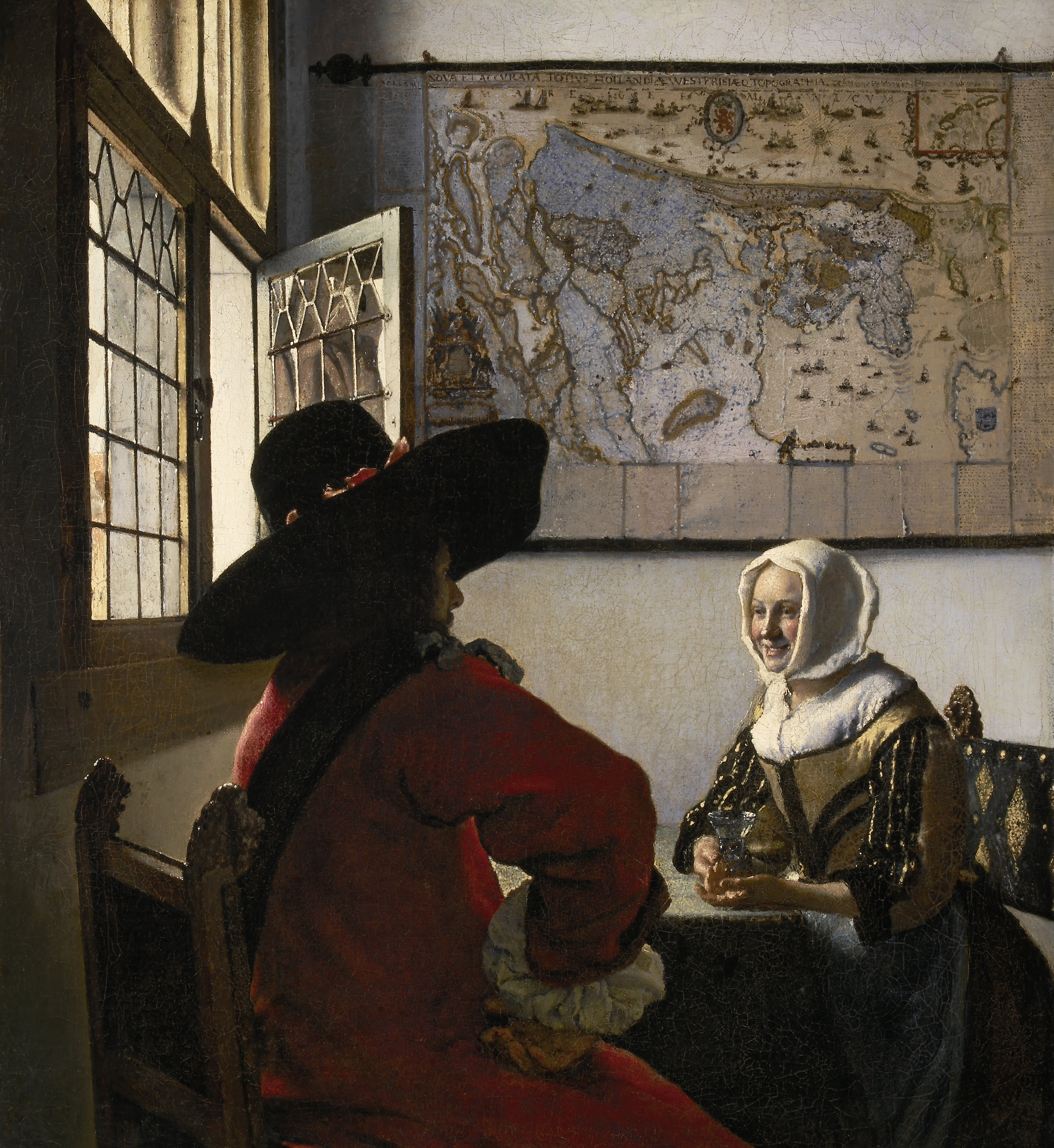
Jan Vermeer, Officer and a Laughing Girl

- Peter Lely – A Boy as a Shepherd (approximate date)
- Rembrandt
  - Hendrickje as flora
  - Jacob Wrestling with the Angel
  - Moses with Law
  - Self Portrait with Beret and Turned-Up Collar
- Salvator Rosa – Allegory of Fortune
- Adriaen van Ostade – The Fish Market
- Diego Velázquez
  - Infanta Margarita Teresa in a Blue Dress
  - Portrait of Prince Philip Prospero
- Jan Vermeer – Officer and a Laughing Girl (1657–59)

== Births ==
- January 21 – Adriaen van der Werff, Dutch painter of portraits and erotic, devotional and mythological scenes (died 1722)
- March 4 – Pierre Lepautre, French sculptor (died 1744)
- April 11 – Hendrick van Streeck, Dutch Golden Age painter of church interiors (died 1719)
- July 8 – Justus van Huysum, Dutch Golden Age flower painter (died 1716)
- July 18 – Hyacinthe Rigaud, French painter of Catalan origin (died 1743)
- August 1 – Sebastiano Ricci, Italian painter in the Cortonesque style of grand manner fresco painting (died 1734)
- September 29 – Michael Dahl, Swedish portrait painter (died 1743)
- December 12 – Francesco Galli Bibiena, Italian architect/painter (died 1739)
- date unknown
  - Faustino Bocchi, Italian painter, active in Brescia, who specialized in bizarre paintings of dwarfs (died 1742)
  - Niccolò Cassana, Italian painter born in Venice (died 1714)
  - Giovanni Paolo Castelli, Italian painter, active in Rome painting still-life paintings of bowls of fruit and flowers (died 1730)
  - Giovanni Girolamo Frezza, Italian engraver (died 1730)
  - Bernard Lens II, English engraver, pioneer of mezzotint technique, and publisher (died 1725)
  - Krzysztof Lubieniecki, Polish Baroque painter and engraver (died 1729)
  - Giovanni Battista Marmi. Italian painter (died 1686)
  - John Baptist Medina, Flemish-Spanish portrait painter and illustrator of Paradise Lost (died 1710)
  - Thomas van der Wilt, Dutch painter (died 1733)
  - Catharina Ykens, Flemish Baroque painter (died unknown)

== Deaths ==
- January 1 – Giovanni Martinelli, Italian painter of allegorical frescoes (died 1600/1604)
- February – Willem Drost, Dutch Baroque painter and printmaker (born 1633)
- October – Valerio Castello, Italian painter (born 1624)
- date unknown
  - Pedro de Obregón, Spanish painter and printmaker (born 1597)
  - Jacques Fouquier, Flemish landscape painter (born 1591)
  - Filippo Gagliardi, Italian painter, active mainly in Rome (date of birth unknown)
  - Jean Lemaire, French painter (born 1598)
  - Giovanni Pietro Possenti, Italian painter of battle scenes (born 1618)
  - Frans Wouters, Flemish Baroque painter (born 1612)
