= Pietro Marchesini =

Italian painter

Pietro Marchesini (April 7, 1692 – October 24, 1757) was an Italian painter of the Baroque period, active in Tuscany.

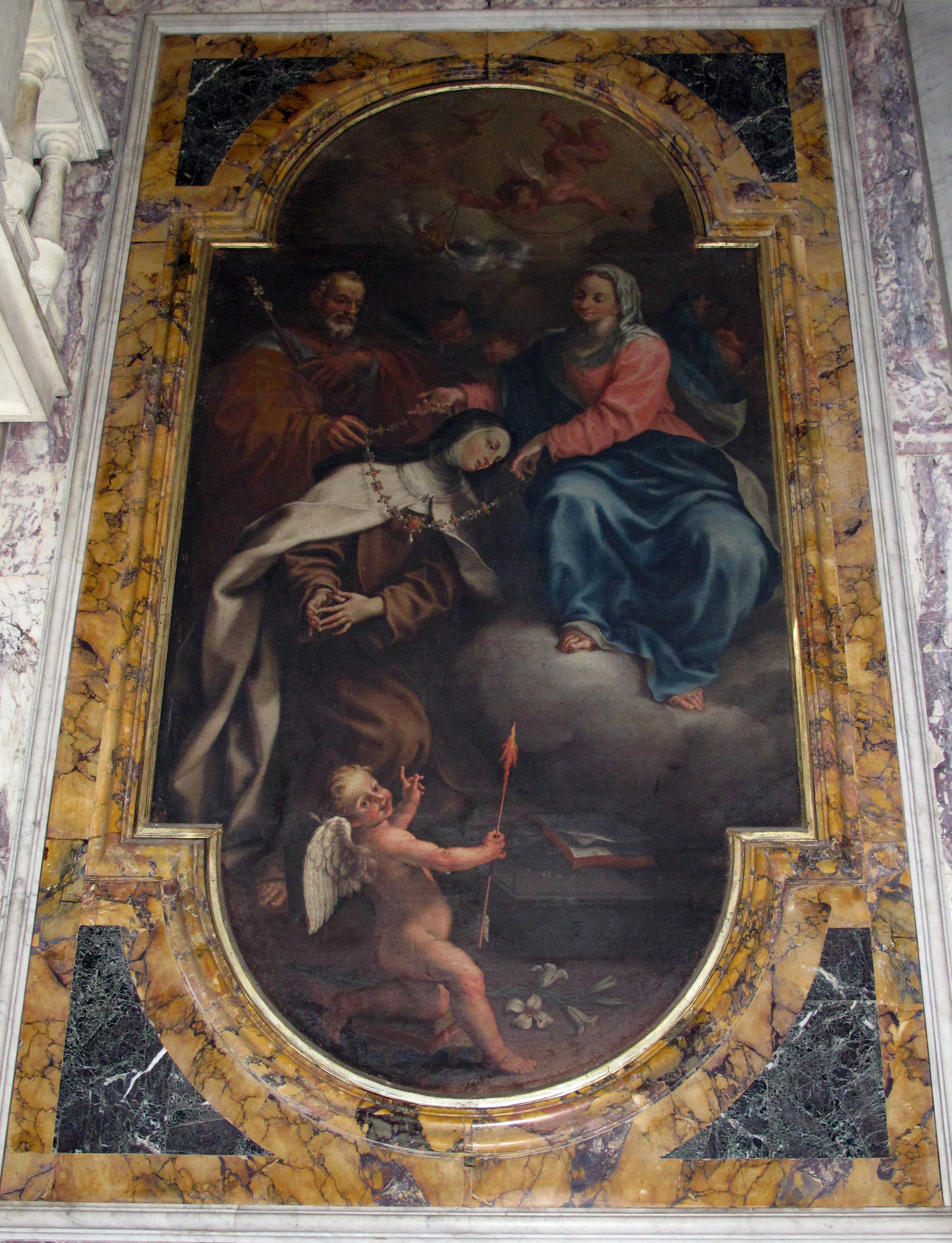
Madonna offers Rosary to St Teresa (c. 1740, Church of San Paolino, Florence)

== Biography ==
He was born in Pistoia. He was patronized by Lorenzo Maria Gianni, and studied with Anton Domenico Gabbiani in Florence. For the Gianni family, he often traveled to create a number of copies of originals of Titian, Veronese, Raphael, Carracci, and Andrea del Sarto. His travels gave his paintings a Venetian coloration. He painted a Santa Margherita for the church of the Ognissanti in Florence; a St Thomas for the church of San Lorenzo. He also painted in Pistoia and the church of Valdibure.
