= Gaetano Gabbiani =

Italian painter

Gaetano Gabbiani (by full name Giovanni Gaetano Gabbiani) was an Italian painter, born in the late 17th century and active in the first third of the 18th century in Florence.

== Biography ==
Born in Florence, as the nephew of a painter Antonio Domenico Gabbiani, he studied under his uncle, and became a meritorious portrait painter in pastel as well as in oil. He painted at least five portraits of members of family Medici.

He died before March 26, 1734 in Florence.

== Works in Uffizi ==
At least five portraits from the so-called "serie aulica" ("the most serene princes"), a collection of portraits of the most important members of the House of Medici:

- Portrait of Princess Violante Beatrice of Bavaria (then Grand Princess of Tuscany)
- Three portraits of Gian Gastone de' Medici
- Portrait of Anna Maria Franziska of Saxe-Lauenburg, his wife
