= Anton Domenico Gabbiani =

Italian painter (1652–1726)

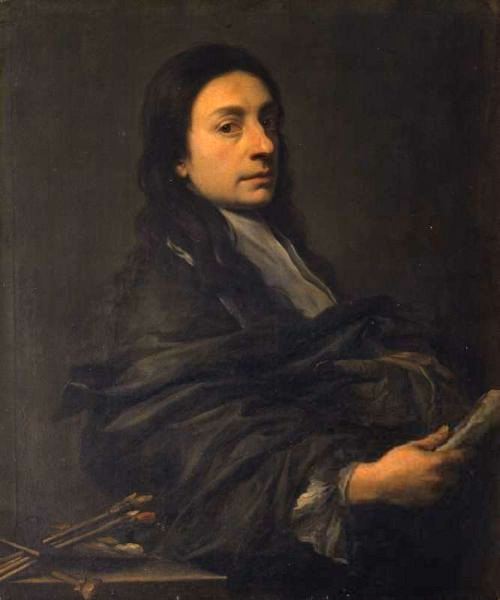
- Self-Portrait
- Born: 13 February 1652; Florence, Grand Duchy of Tuscany
- Died: 22 November 1726 (aged 74)
- Known for: Painting
- Movement: Baroque

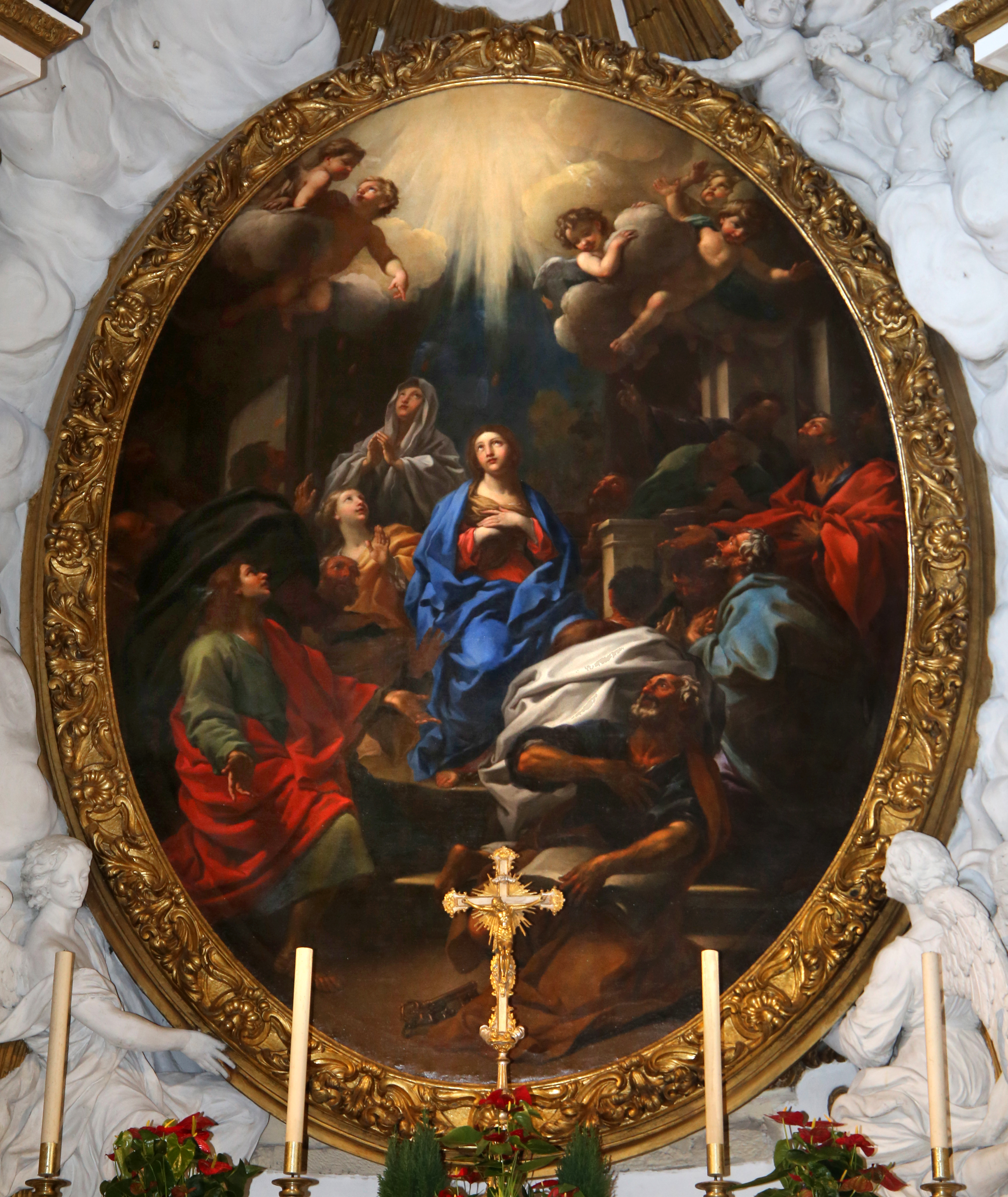
Pentecost, 1705, San Giorgio alla Costa, Florence

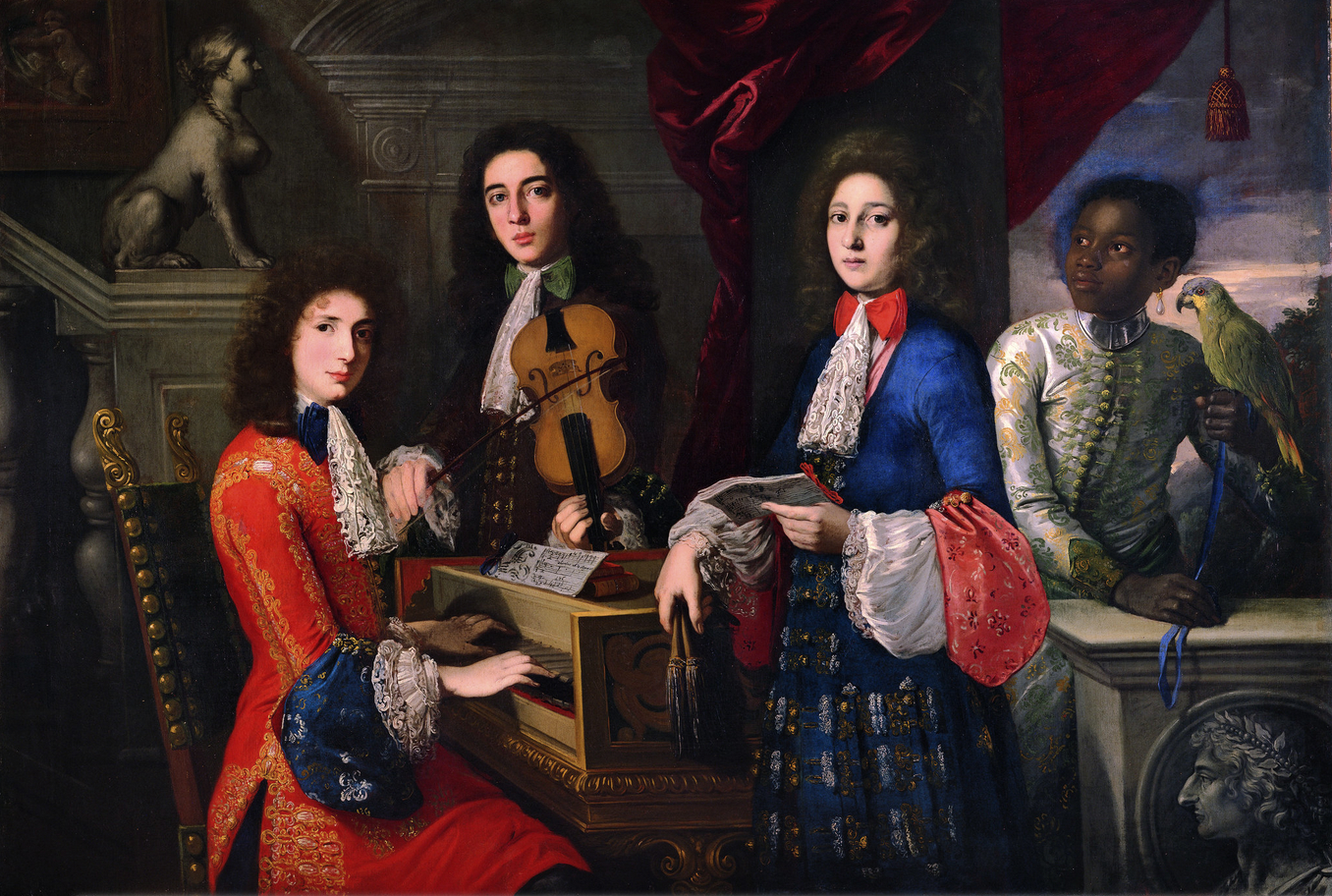
Three musicians and servant with parrot

Anton Domenico Gabbiani (13 February 1652 – 22 November 1726) was an Italian painter and active in a late Baroque style. He worked primarily in Florence for the Medici court.

== Biography ==
Born in Florence, Gabbiani first apprenticed with the Medici court portrait painter Justus Sustermans, then with the Florentine Vincenzo Dandini; subsequently moved to Rome in 1673, where he studied under the Medici-sponsored Accademia Fiorentina, led by Ciro Ferri and Ercole Ferrata. This latter tutelage and his style has led Gabbiani to be described as one of the ‘’Cortoneschi’’ or followers of Pietro da Cortona, albeit second-generation. In 1678–79, he traveled to Venice, where he worked in the studio of Sebastiano Bombelli, returning to his native Florence in 1680, where he was often patronized by Grand Prince Ferdinando, the son of the Grand Duke Cosimo III. He painted the portrait of his patron surrounded by musicians (c. 1685; Pitti Palace). He frescoed the Apotheosis of Cosimo il Vecchio in the ceiling of the Sala da Pranzo in the Villa di Poggio a Caiano (1698).

Gabbiani also completed works on sacred subjects. He painted in the church of San Frediano in Cestello. By 1684, he completed an Annunciation for the Pitti Palace. He completed a St. Francis de Sales in Glory (1685) for the church of Santi Apostoli.

His pupils included Giovanna Fratellini, Ignazio Enrico Hugford (also a biographer), Benedetto Luti, Pietro Marchesini of Pistoia, Ranieri del Pace, Giovanni Battista, Tommaso Redi, and his brother Gaetano Gabbiani.

== Frescoes of the Palazzina Meridiana ==
Gabbiani’s masterpiece is considered to be his ceiling frescoes for the Palazzina Meridiana, specifically in the Sala Meridiana adjacent to the Pitti Palace and Boboli Gardens. This work underscores the frequent, yet somewhat ostentatious Medici patronage of arts related to science. The Salone was so named because it encased a Meridian line (a metal strip along floor and wall) with which one could make annotations of solar time, by noting where a beam of sunlight pointed at high noon. The Palazzina once formed the south west corner of the Pitti, and is little visited.

When the frescoes were painted, the Palazzina rooms were part of the mezzanine apartment of Grand-prince Ferdinando de' Medici, son of the Grand Duke Cosimo III and child-pupil of Vicenzo Viviani. Viviana was a court scholar who had been devoted to Galileo in the master’s last years, and even published some of his papers posthumously. For the Sala Meridiana, Gabbiani adopted a panoramic ceiling similar to both Cortona’s apotheotic frescoes in Palazzo Barberini and in the Sal di Marte in the Pitti itself. Open sky is depicted above and around the cornice a circumferential horizon of activity. Originally, the room was pierced by a hole in the ceiling, now sealed, originally located near the trunk of the frescoed tree. At noon, a sun beam through the hole, alit on the meridian strip. The iconography is complex, and was described by his Gabbiani’s pupil Hugford as Time raising up Arts and Sciences to the temple of glory and trampling Ignorance. Some of the icons can be identified, Father Time sits below the tree, near the column. His symbols, detailed in Cesare Ripa’s Iconologia (1603), are the scythe, circle and hourglass, and are lofted about by neighboring putti. The woman on his arm is Scienza or Knowledge preening herself in the mirror. Ignorance has ass’s ears supine by broken column.

But the genius of the work is the lonely bearded figure on the side, behind a cannon and beside an armillary sphere, detached from the lofty bombast. The portrait matches the portrait by Susterman of Galileo, who sits on the sidelines, behind a symbol of his contribution to the science of ballistics. Perhaps he awaits Time, who points to him, to defeat ignorance, and rescue him from the ignominy he suffered at the hands of the Roman Inquisition.
