= Giovanni Martinelli (painter) =

Italian painter

Giovanni Martinelli (Montevarchi, Arezzo 1600 - Florence 1659) was an Italian, Baroque era painter active mainly in Florence.

== Life ==
Inexplicably ignored by biographers and art historians, Martinelli was long left in the shadows. As Luigi Lanzi suggested in his History of Painting in Italy in 1847, his works however deserve far more attention. On the 400th anniversary of his birth, the artist finally received the acknowledgement he merits; He was the subject, first, of a monographic volume containing various essays dedicated to aspects of his brilliant sacred and profane production, both on canvas and in frescoes, and, subsequently, of an exhibition organized by the Uffizi in his native town.

Martinelli started his apprenticeship in the studio of Jacopo Ligozzi in Florence and stayed there until 1625. Little is known about his early days as an artist. It however seems he was relatively successful, considering that the Commander of the Order of Malta and late patron of Caravaggio, Fra Francesco Dell'Antella, commissioned him in 1622 a number of works (now lost) for the church of San Leonardo in Grosseto.

Though there is no documented trace of the artist during the following ten years, he most likely sojourned in Rome, beginning a long and profitable period of study. There, he probably came into contact with the paintings of Caravaggio and the caraveggesque movement. This thesis is confirmed by the style Martinelli adopted in the altarpiece with the Miracle of the Mule today in the church of San Francesco at Pescia, Pistoia. Created in 1632, the painting demonstrates a profound adhesion to the Caravaggesque lesson in terms of naturalistic mastery and use of light.

During all these years, Martinelli also painted allegories characterized by the prevailing influence of Orazio and Artemisia Gentileschi as well as the French Vouet and Valentin. The faces of the protagonists in the paintings of those years are rendered with clarity and illuminated by clear, cold colour tones.

In 1636, Martinelli enrolled the Accademia del Disegno in Florence. Partly due to the influence of the works of Francesco Furini and Cesare Dandini, he then began to paint more complex allegories and to darken the range of colour tones. Although devoid of any chronological reference, the paintings made in this stylistic phase clearly distinct themselves from the ones created in the earlier periods.

By 1638, Martinelli completed a series of frescoes for the Certosa del Galluzzo, near Florence.

The artist died in 1659, leaving a significant work that deserves far more commend than it received.

== Works ==
Giovanni Martinelli was an assiduous adept of the allegorical representation. In perfect harmony with the climate of fervent philosophical and moral debate practised by the local Academies, he owned a remarkable skill in rendering a captious symbolism in his figures. His allegorical works are of rare elegance and refined formal nobility, having little to envy to the other representatives of the Florentine Seicento, such as Francesco Furini, Cesare Dandini and Lorenzo Lippi.

The artist concentrated on rendering the elegance and beauty of the female figure. Most women protagonists in his paintings are illustrated with long and slender hands, slightly parted vermillion lips and the hair held in place by a ribbon, such as in the series of four Allegories dedicated to the Arts of the Quadrivium executed for the Rospigliosi family.

Martinelli also dedicated a major part of his work to the painting of religious subjects and biblical stories, charging them with strong moral connotations. Among these, the extraordinary Feast of Balthasar and the Ecce Homo in the Uffizi or the Judgement of Solomon in the National Art Gallery in Karlsruhe.

The artist's outstanding rendering of objects, regardless of the subject, reflects his interest for nature.

== Gallery ==
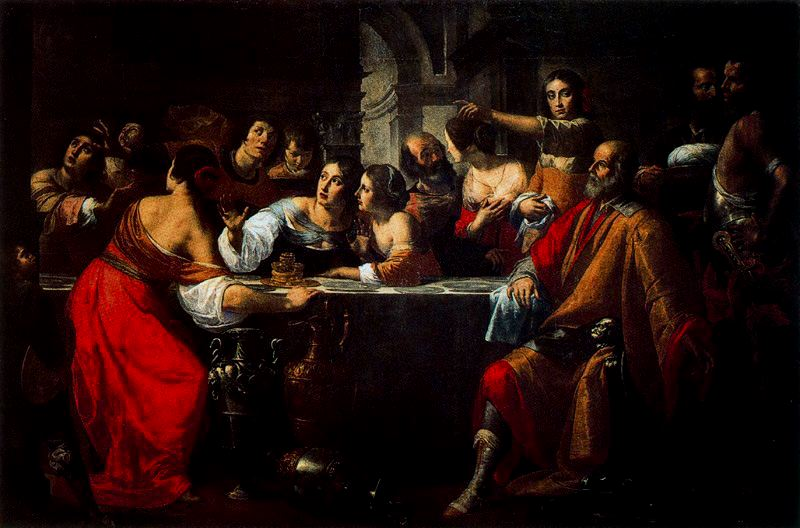
Giovanni Martinelli, The Banquet of Baldassarre, Uffizi

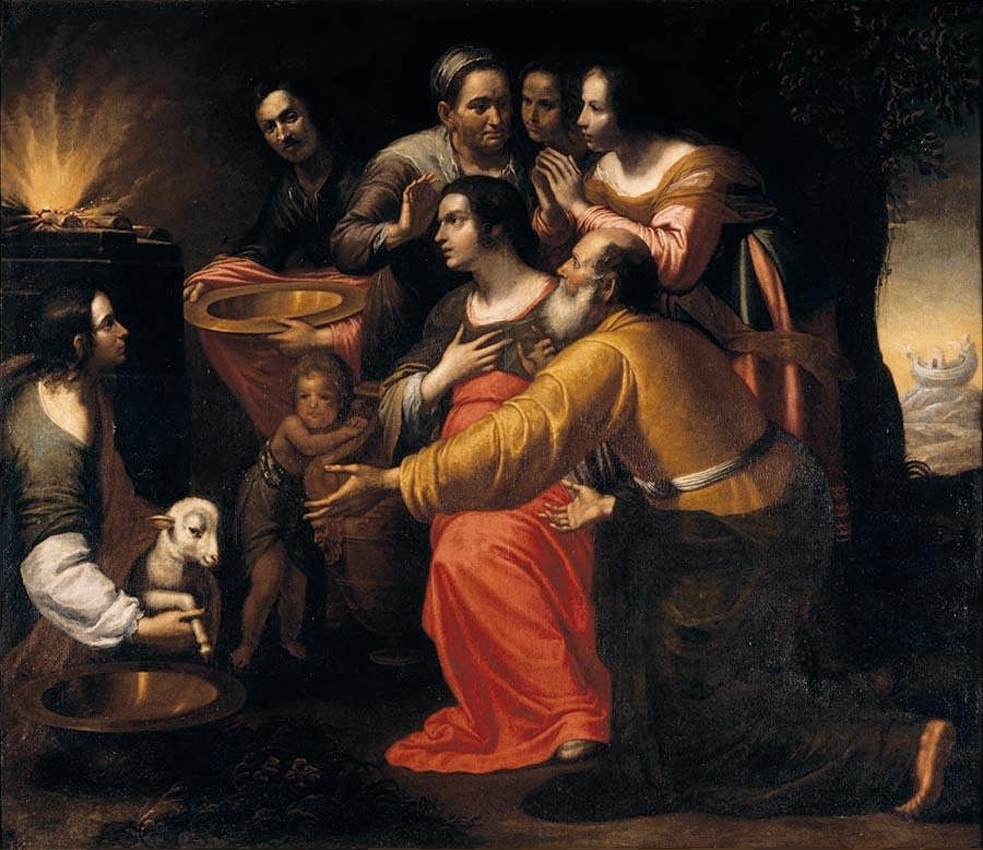
Giovanni Martinelli, The Sacrifice of Noah

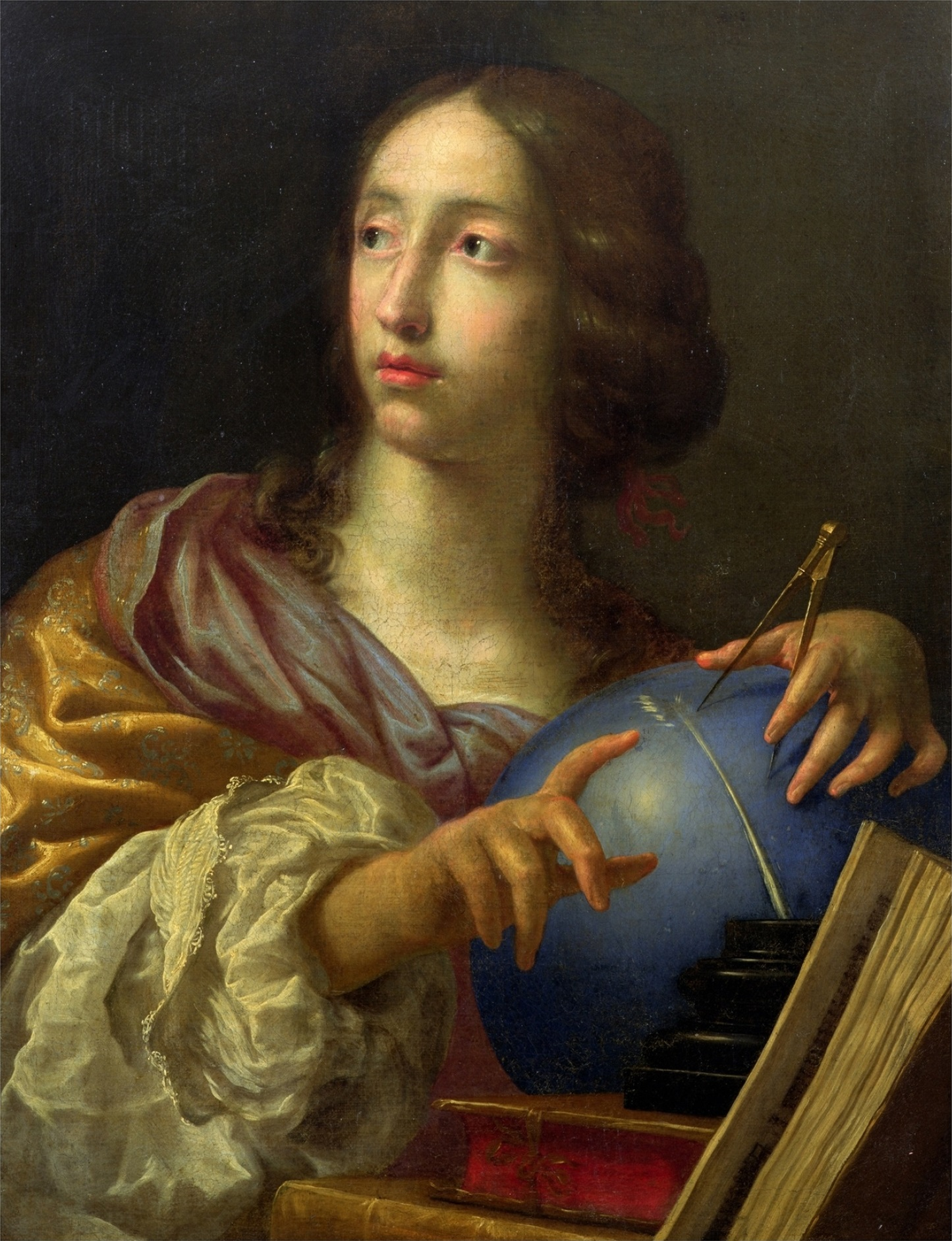
Giovanni Martinelli, Allegory of Astronomy

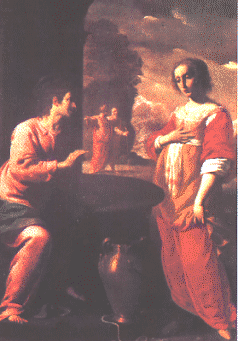
Giovanni Martinelli, Christ and the Samaritan at the Fountain, 1638

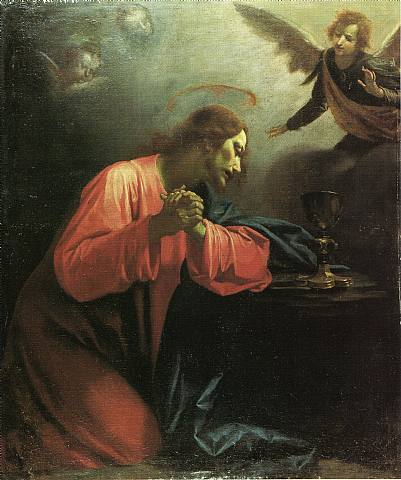
Giovanni Martinelli, Christ in Prayer

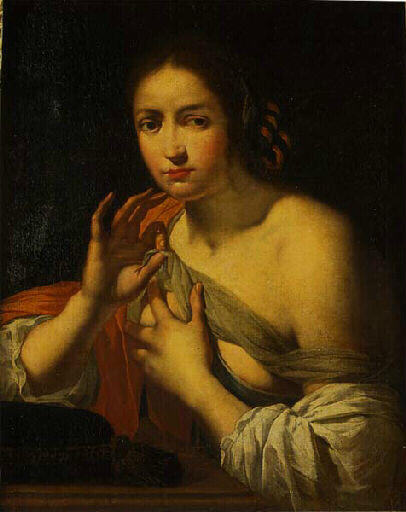
Giovanni Martinelli, Portrait of Young Woman, Musée des Beaux-Arts, Chambéry

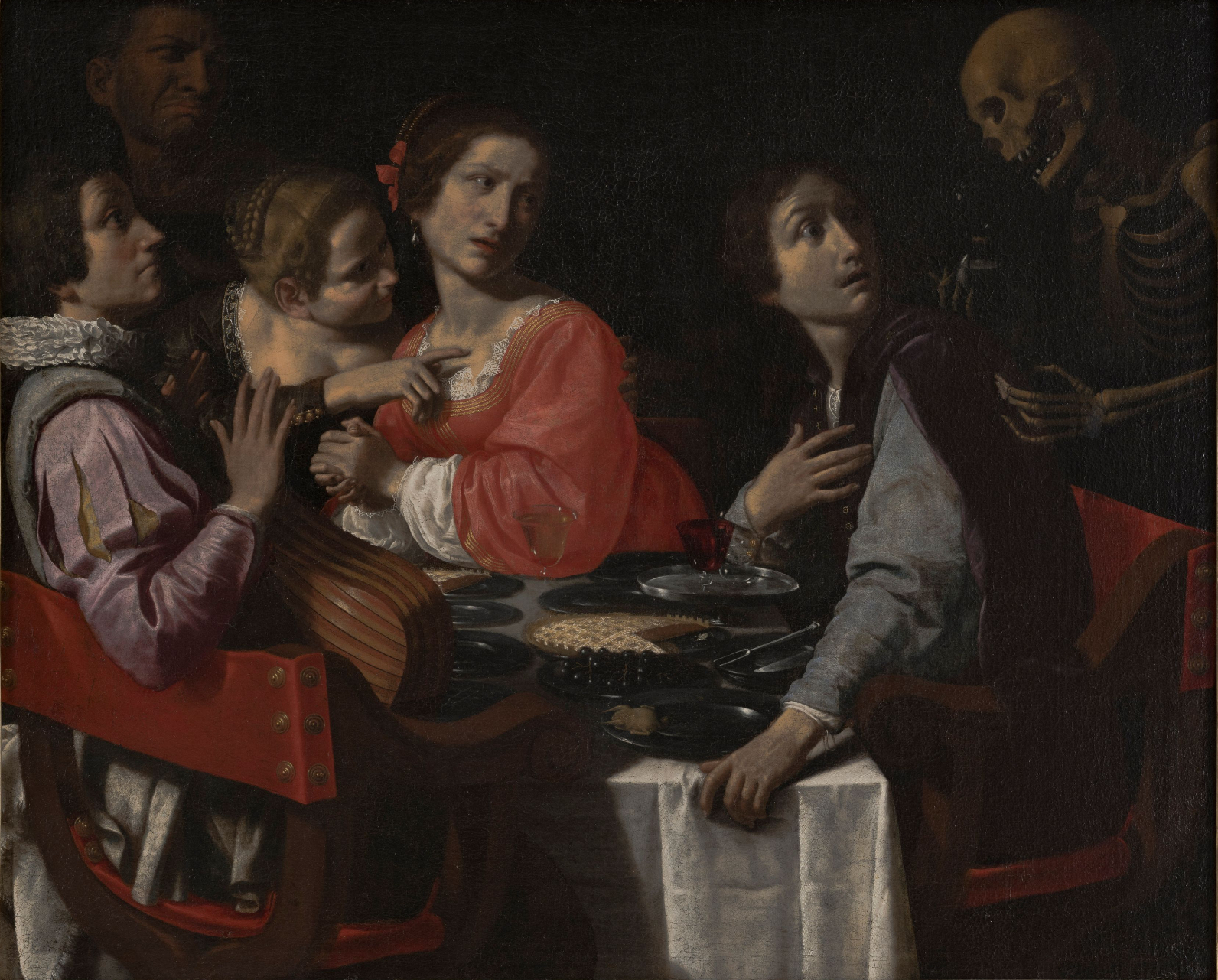
Giovanni Martinelli, Death comes to the table

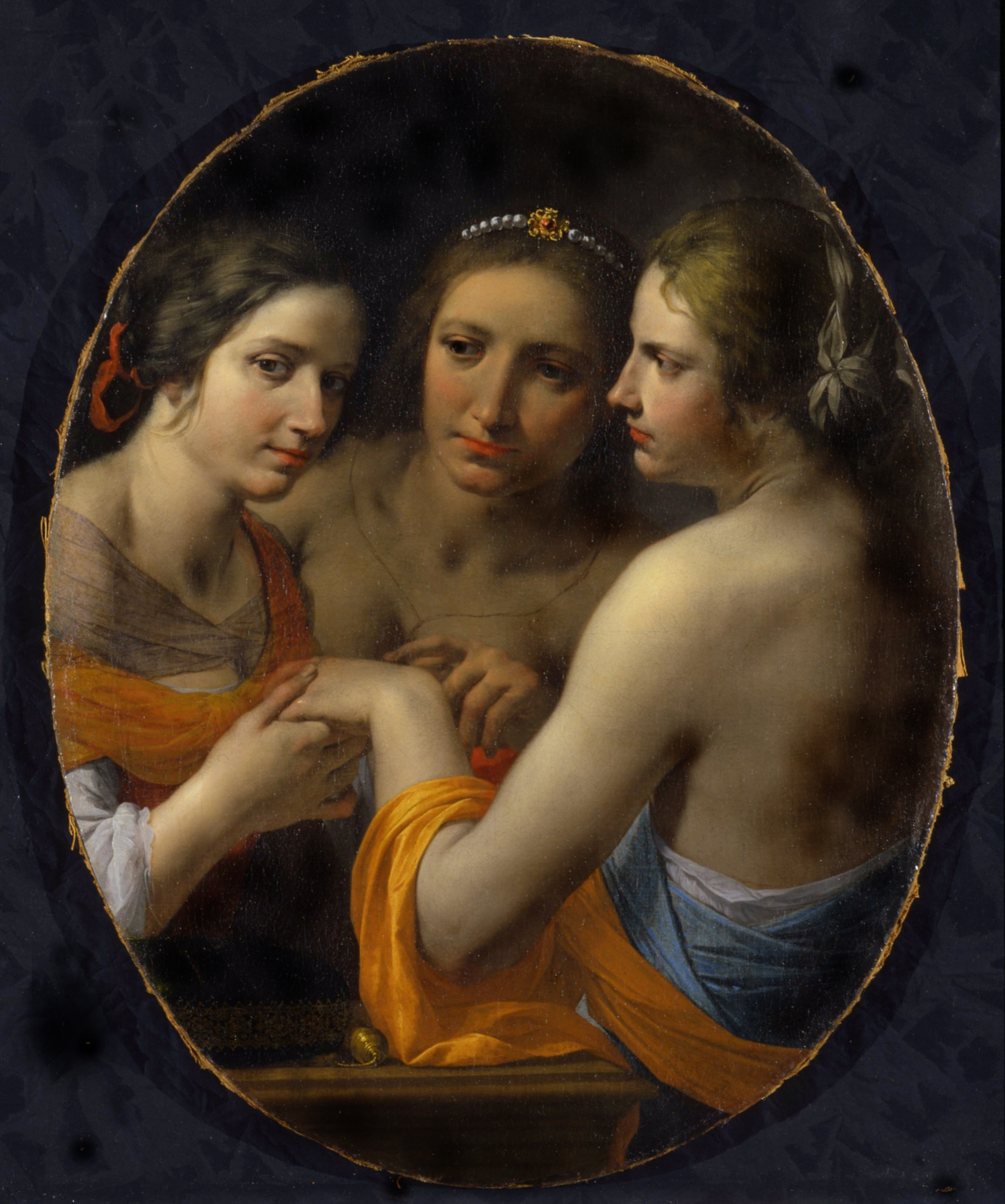
Giovanni Martinelli, The Three Graces

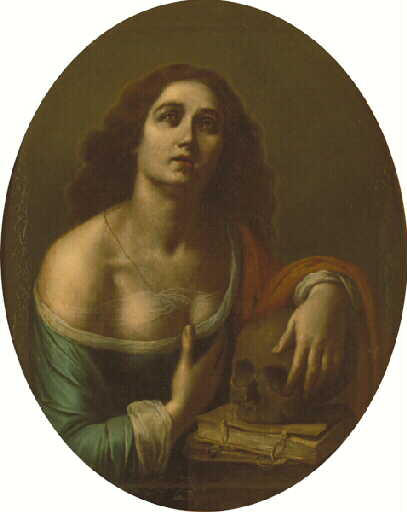
Giovanni Martinelli, Maddalena Penitent, Musée des Ursulines, Mâcon

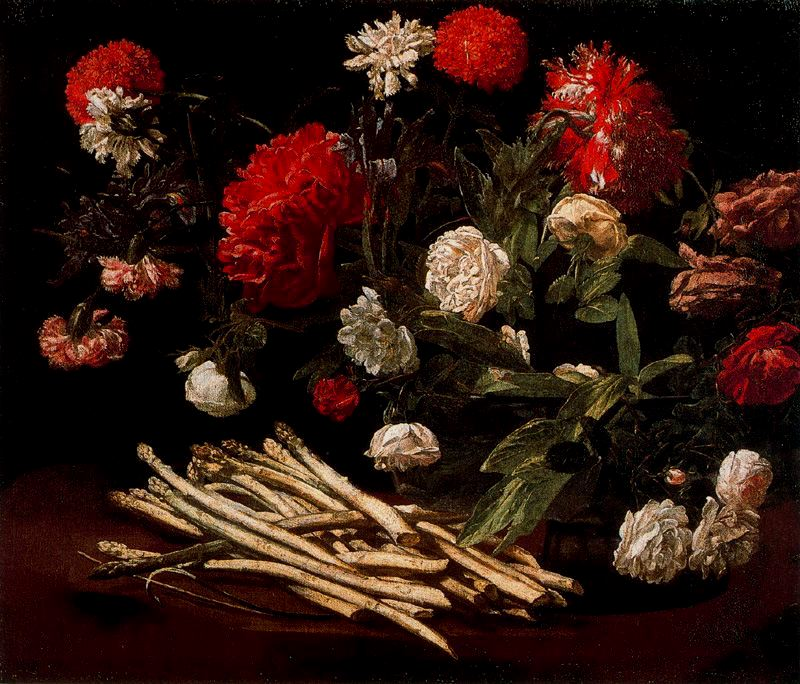
Giovanni Martinelli, Dead Flowers, Palazzo Pitti

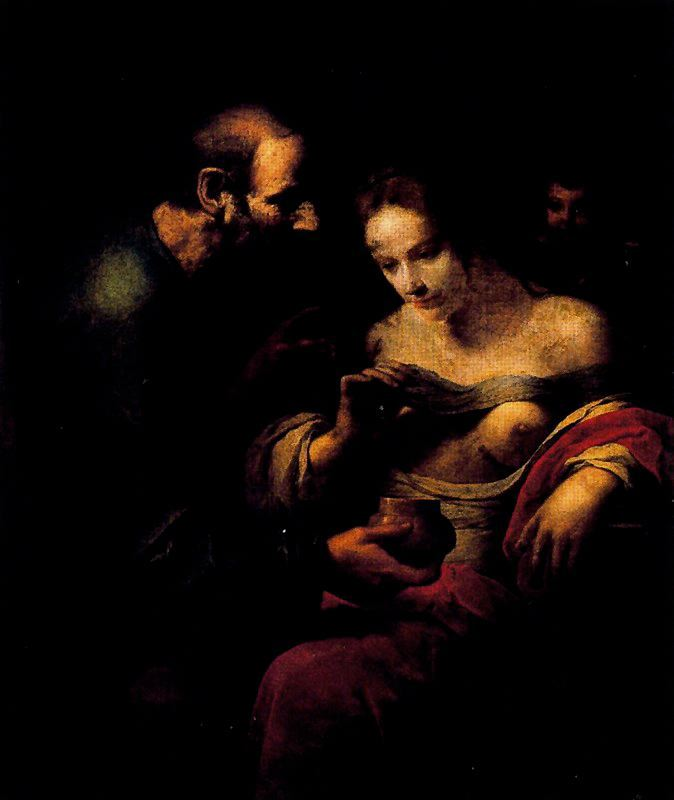
Giovanni Martinelli, Saint Agueda cured by Saint Peter in Prison, Museo del Prado

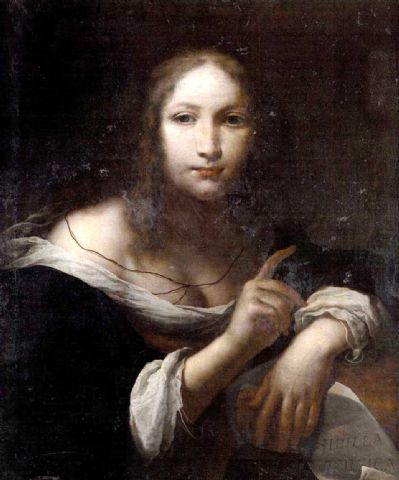
Giovanni Martinelli, The Persian Sybil

== Sources ==
- Grove Art encyclopedia entry
