= Vincenzo Dandini =

Italian painter

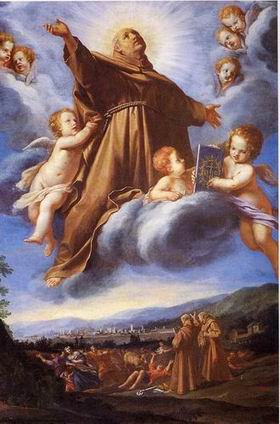
Vincenzo Dandini, San Bernardino in Gloria, 1663

Vincenzo Dandini (1607–1675) was an Italian Baroque painter, active mainly in Florence.

He was a pupil of his elder brother, Cesare Dandini and studied at the Accademia delle Arti del Disegno in Florence. He then moved to Rome and worked in the studio of Pietro da Cortona.

He painted an Immaculate Conception and other canvases for the church of Ognissanti, Florence. He painted a fresco of the Aurora and the Hours for the Villa del Poggio Imperiale. He painted a canvas on oil of Sacrifice of Niobe for the Villa La Petraja. He also produced designs for the Medici tapestry factory.

Among his pupils were Giovanni Battista Marmi and Antonio Domenico Gabbiani. His nephew Pietro and his two children, Ottaviano and Vincenzo the younger, also worked as painters in his studio.

== Sources ==
- Hobbes, James R. (1849). Picture collector's manual adapted to the professional man, and the amateur. London: T&W Boone. p. 72.
- biography of Cesare
