= Giovanni Battista Marmi =

Italian painter (1659–1686)

Giovanni Battista Marmi (1659–1686) was an Italian painter of the Baroque period. He initially apprenticed with Vincenzo Dandini, then Livio Mehus, then moved to Rome to become a pupil of the painter Ciro Ferri and Giovanni Maria Morandi.
