= Pietro Dandini =

Italian painter (1646–1712)

Pietro (Pier) Dandini
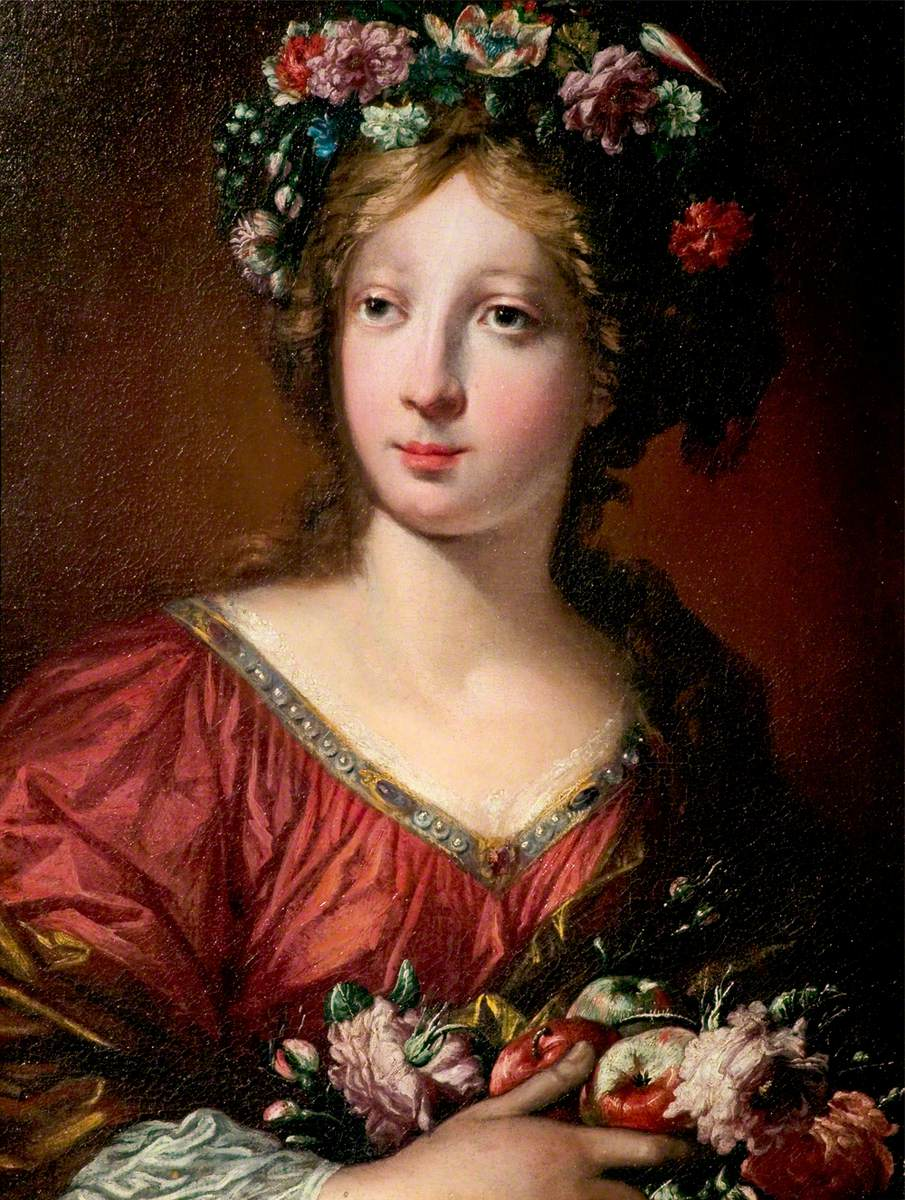
- Flora, Derby Museum and Art Gallery, Derby
- Born: Pietro Dandini; 12 April 1646; Florence Tuscany, Italy
- Died: 26 November 1712 (aged 66); Florence Tuscany, Italy
- Education: Vincenzo Dandini
- Known for: Painting
- Movement: Baroque

Pietro Dandini (12 April 1646 – 26 November 1712) was an Italian painter of the Baroque period, active mainly in Florence.

== Biography ==
He is also called Pier Dandini. He was the son (or nephew) and pupil of the painter Vincenzo Dandini. Pietro's uncle, Cesare Dandini, was a prominent painter in Florence. Vincenzo's sons, Ottaviano and Vincenzo Dandini the younger also became painters. Among his pupils as Valerio Baldassarri of Pescia, Father Alberico Carlini of Vellano, Gaetano Santarelli Giovanna Fratellini, and Giovanni Cinqui. In addition to having training within the family, he traveled to Bologna, Modena, Venice, and Rome to learn about art. As a painter, Dandini's styles are eclectic, as reflected in his travels, though he has the high-minded graciousness and delicacy characteristic of Florentine Baroque.

Pietro was strongly patronized by members of the Medici Family, including prince Ferdinand and the Grand Duke. He completed a number of ecclesiastical commissions in Florence, including frescoes in the vault for San Jacopo Soprarno; in the chapel of San Bernardo in the church of San Frediano; in the lunettes for San Giovannino degli Scolopi; and in the dome of the main chapel of the church of Santa Maria Maddalena dei Pazzi depicting the Ascension of St Maria Maddalena de' Pazzi surrounded by Florentine Saints (1701). He also painted an altarpiece depicting the Beheading of John the Baptist for the church of San Giovannino dei Cavalieri; a St Francis in Santa Maria Maggiore in Rome; an altarpiece in the Church of Santa Caterina d'Alessandria in Pisa; an altarpiece of God the Father for the Santuario della Madonna del Giglio of Prato; an Adoration of the Magi for the Church of Santa Croce in Vinci, Italy; and painting in the former convent of San Francesco de' Macci.

Other works in situ include frescoes in the Capella Nuova of Villa La Petraia; murals for Villa Bellavista near Pistoia; and in the Florentine Palazzo Corsini. He painted a large canvas of the Battle of Vienna in 1683 (now lost) for the auditor Filippo Lucci, which won the admiration of contemporary critics such as Francesco Saverio Baldinucci, from whom we can derive the most biographical information about Pietro's life. The Palazzo Montecitorio in Rome has a series of paintings of the Four Seasons. He also painted some pastoral and rustic scenes.

== Gallery ==
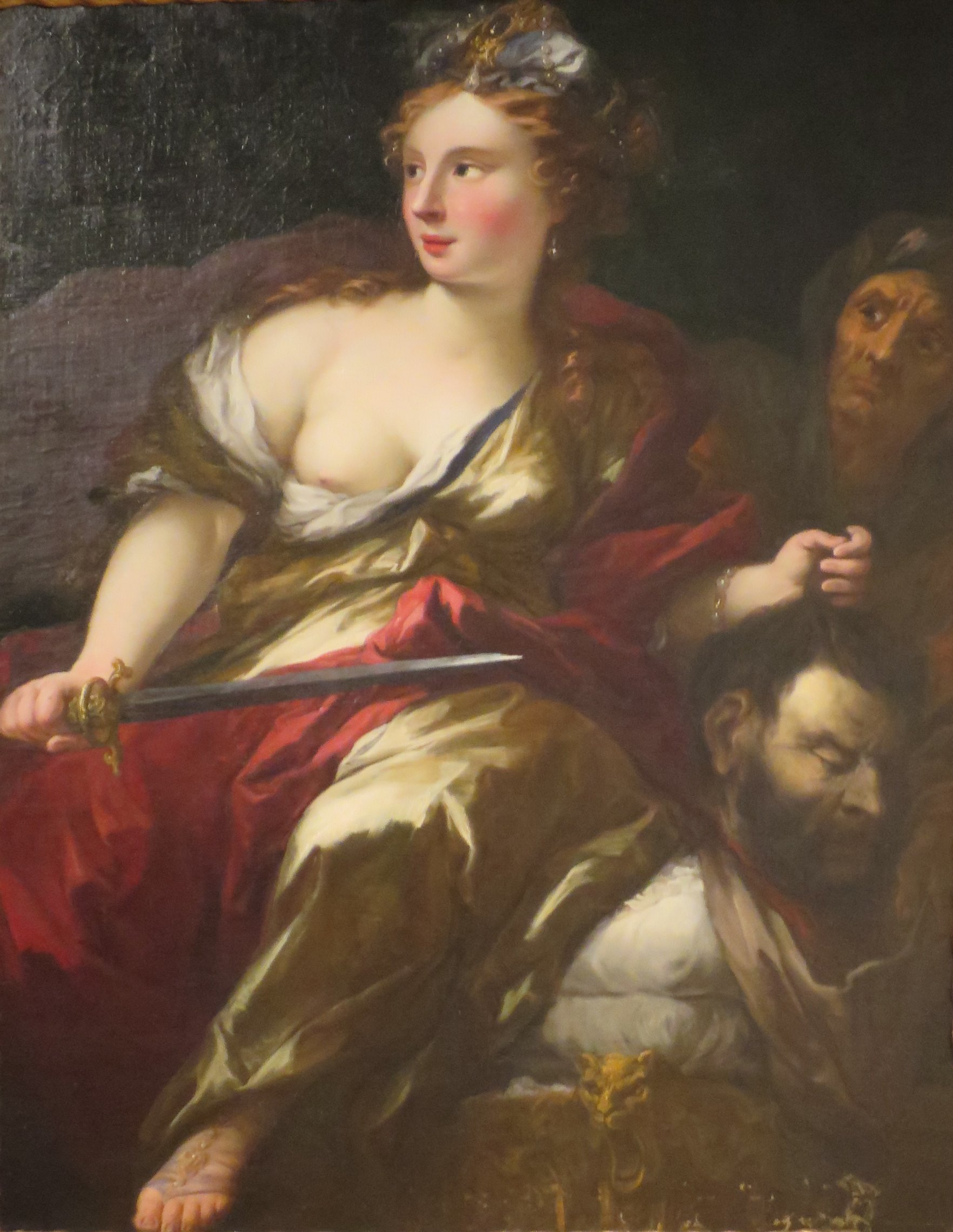
Judith with the Head of Holofernes, Lowe Art Museum, Coral Gables, Florida

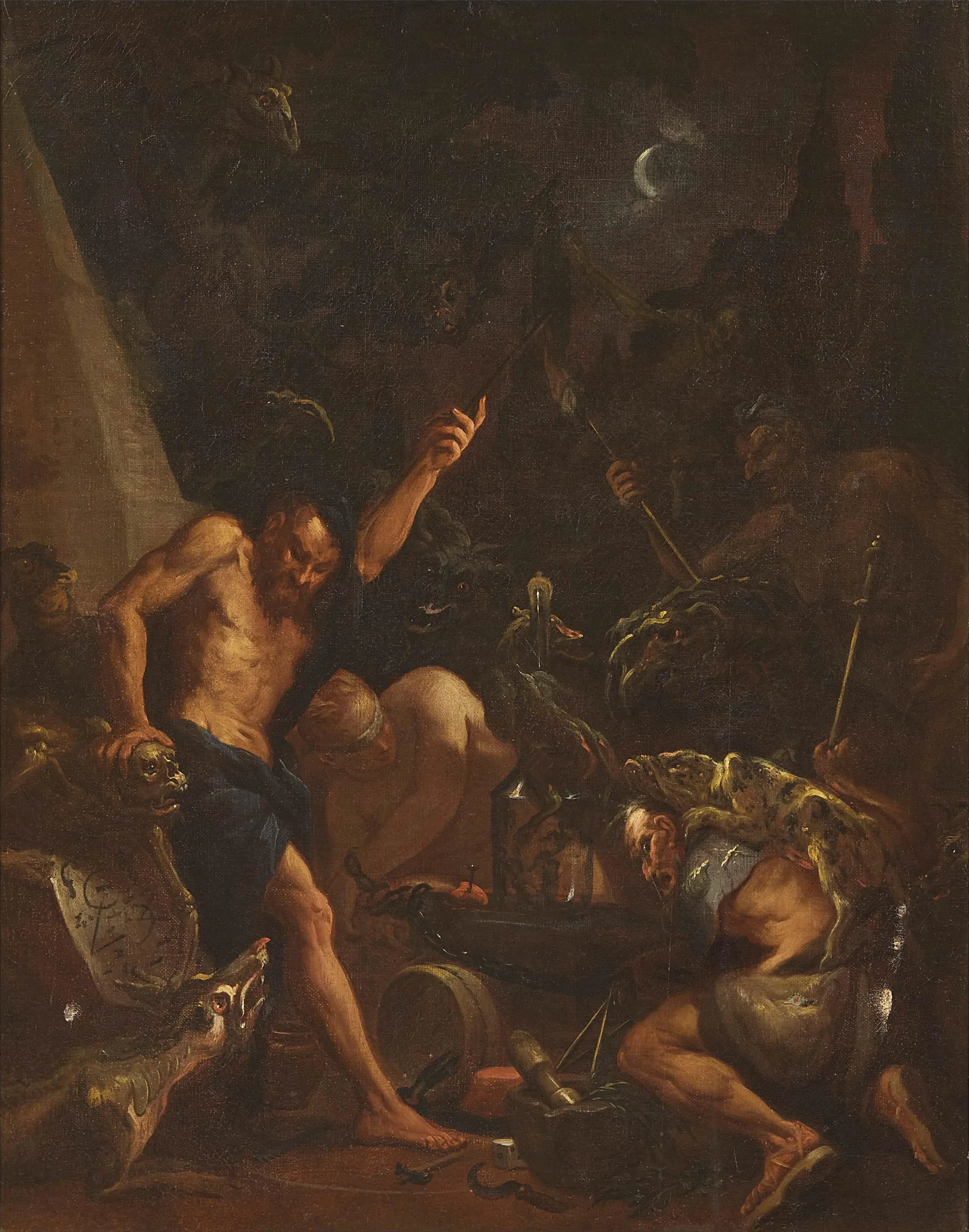
Witchcraft Scene, priv. col.

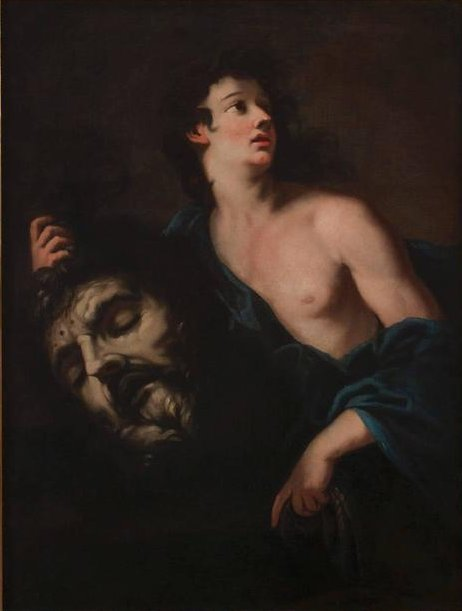
David with the Head of Goliath, priv. col.

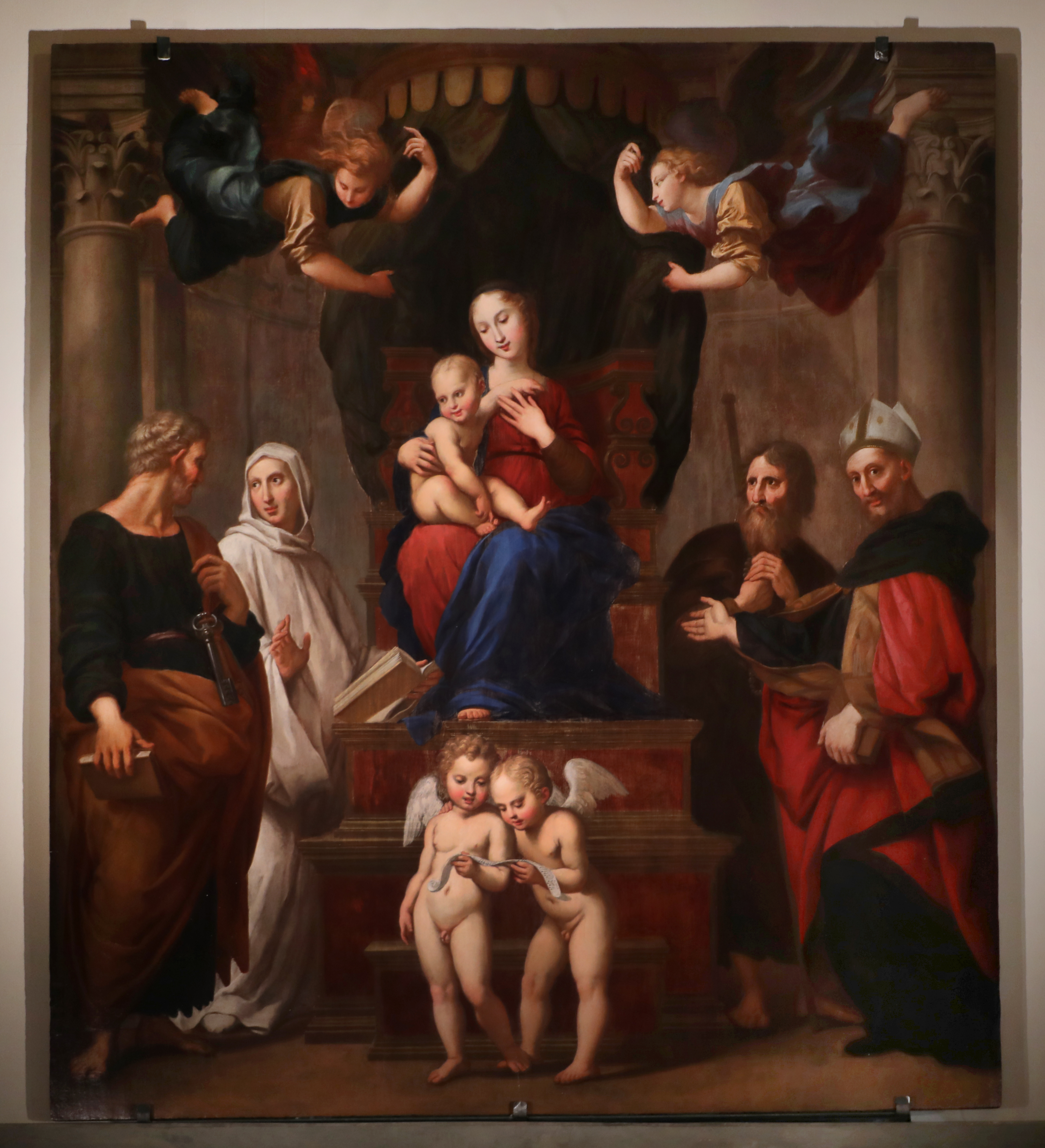
Madonna with Child and Saints, Pescia Cathedral

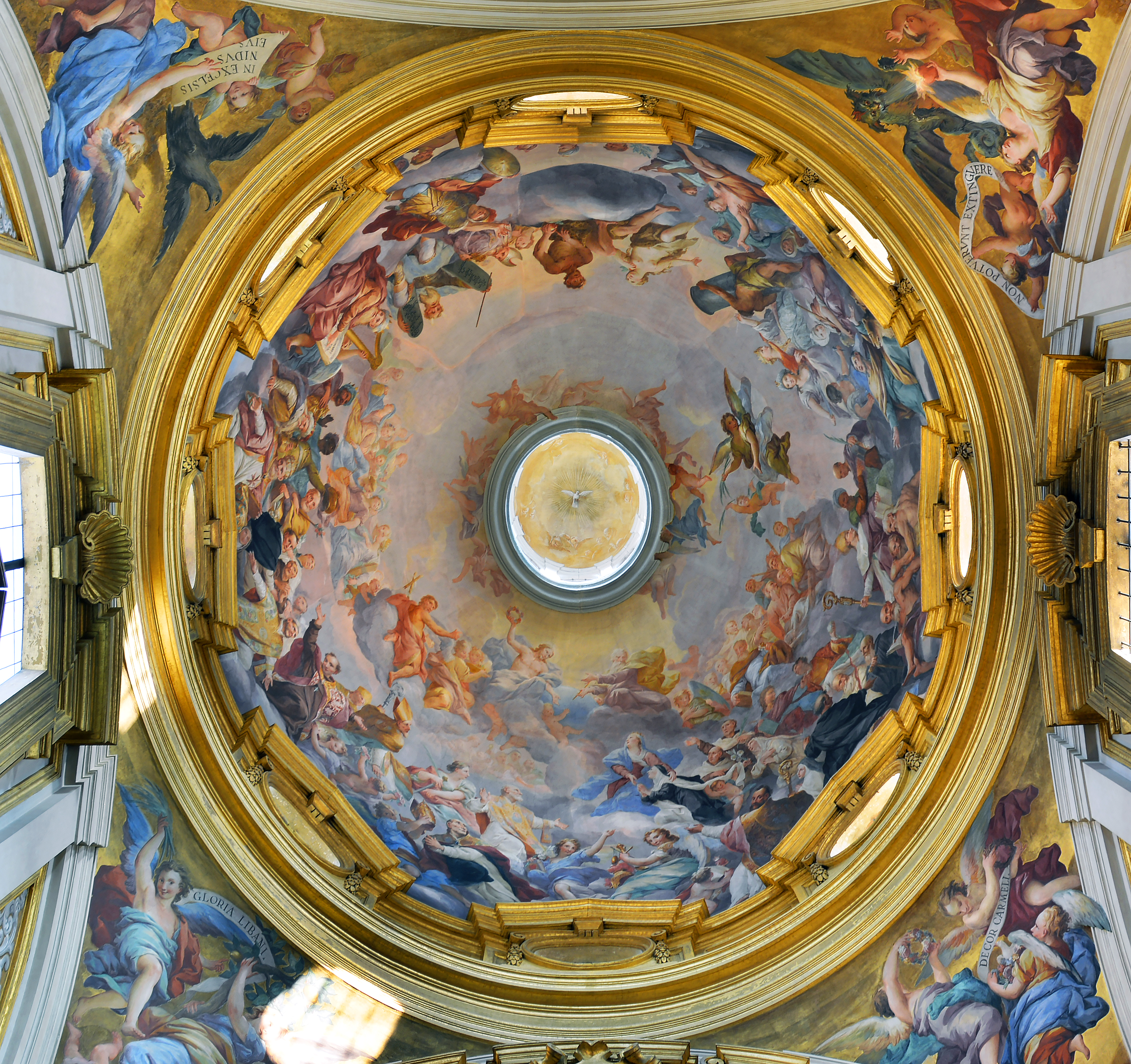
Dome, Santa Maria Maddalena de' Pazzi, Florence

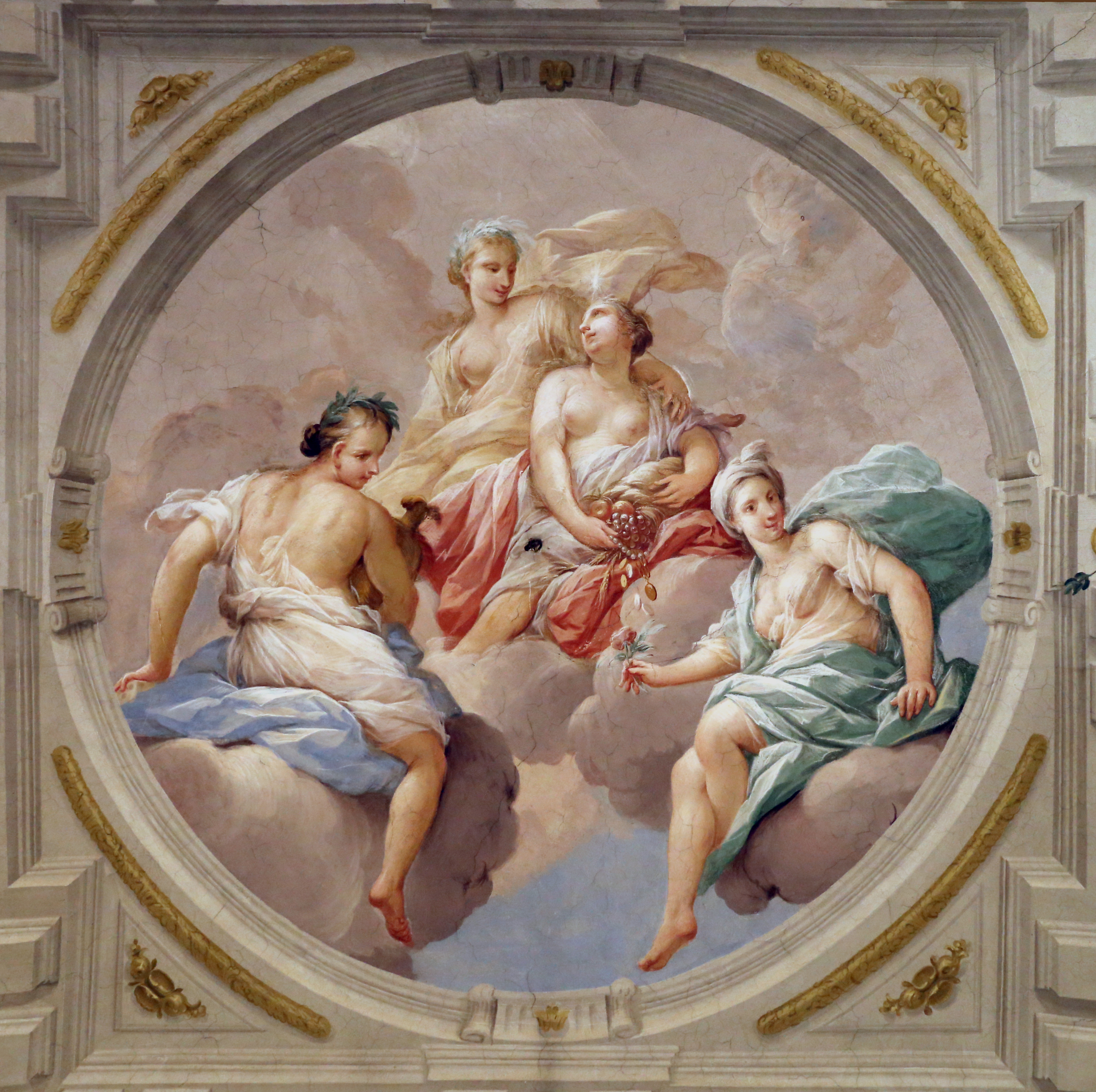
Four Allegories, Florence, Palazzo Tempi

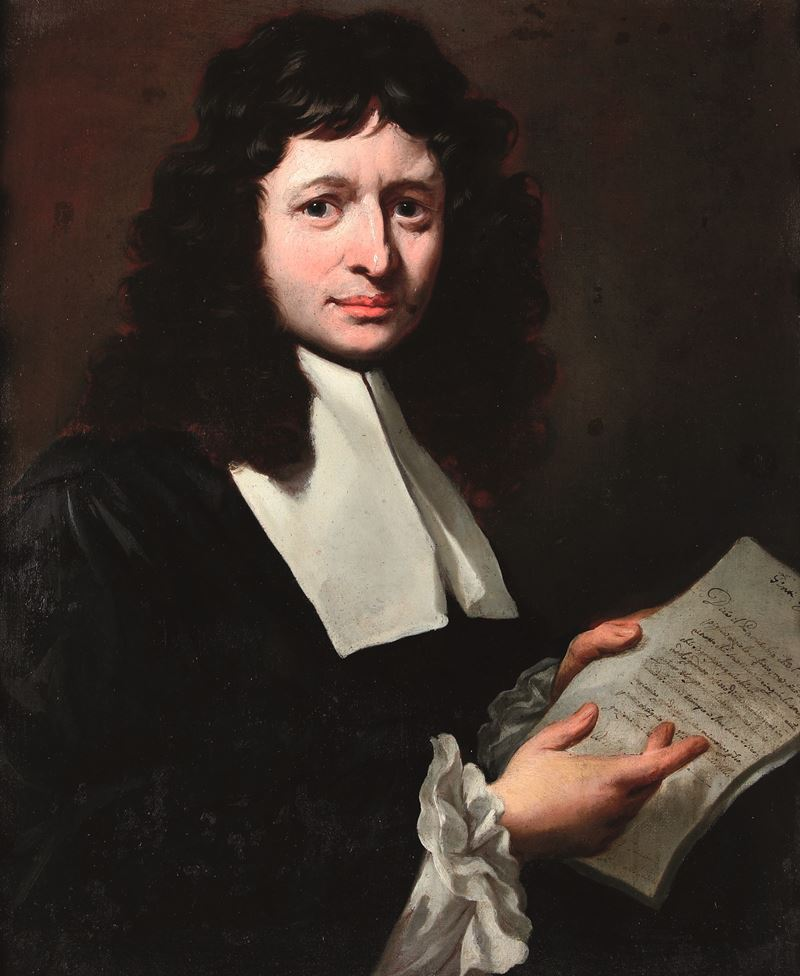
Portrait of Francesco Redi, priv. col.

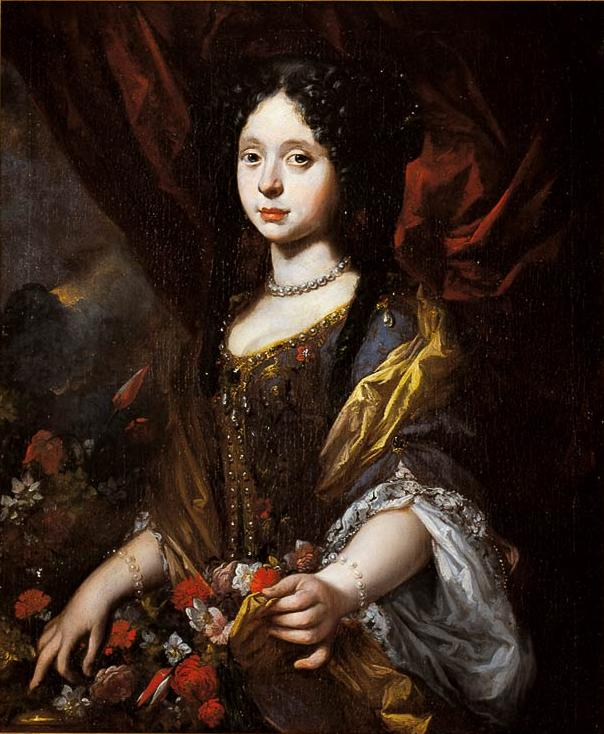
Anna Maria Luisa de' Medici as Flora, Uffizi, Florence
