= Cesare Dandini =

Italian painter (1596–1657)

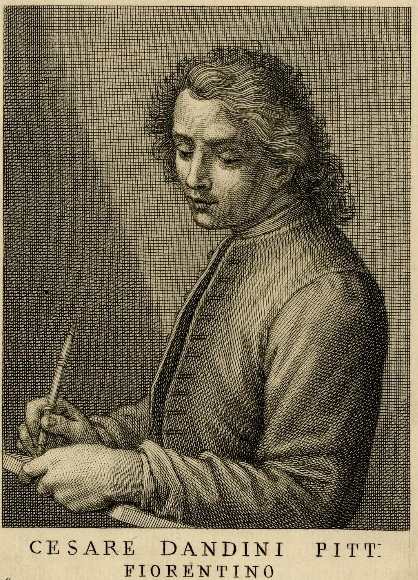
- Born: 1 October 1596; Florence
- Died: 7 February 1657 (aged 60)
- Known for: Painting
- Movement: Baroque

Cesare Dandini (1 October 1596– 7 February 1657) was an Italian Baroque painter, active mainly in his native city of Florence.

== Biography ==
He was the older brother of the painter Vincenzo Dandini (1609–1675). His nephew, Pietro was a pupil of Vincenzo, and Pietro's two sons, Ottaviano Dandini and the Jesuit priest Vincenzo also worked as painters in Florence.

According to the biographer Baldinucci, Cesare first worked under Francesco Curradi, then Cristofano Allori, and finally Domenico Passignano. He enrolled in 1621 in the Accademia del Disegno. Dandini displayed a Florentine tradition of bold color contrasts and elegant, linear compositions. His style has the polish and attention to draughtsmanship and design characteristic of Florentines like Carlo Dolci.

Among his pupils were Stefano della Bella, Alessandro Rosi, the landscape painter Antonio Giusti, Giovanni Domenico Ferrucci, and Jacopo Giorgi.

== Lost painting found ==
In 2020, a lost painting by Dandini "Holy Family with the Infant St. John" was found in a church in New Rochelle, New York by Iona College Art History Professor Thomas Ruggio. The rediscovered painting is one of at least four paintings by Dandini that are connected to each other. One is in The Hermitage Museum, and another is in the Metropolitan Museum of Art. The fourth painting was last known to be part of a private collection in New York City.

== Gallery ==
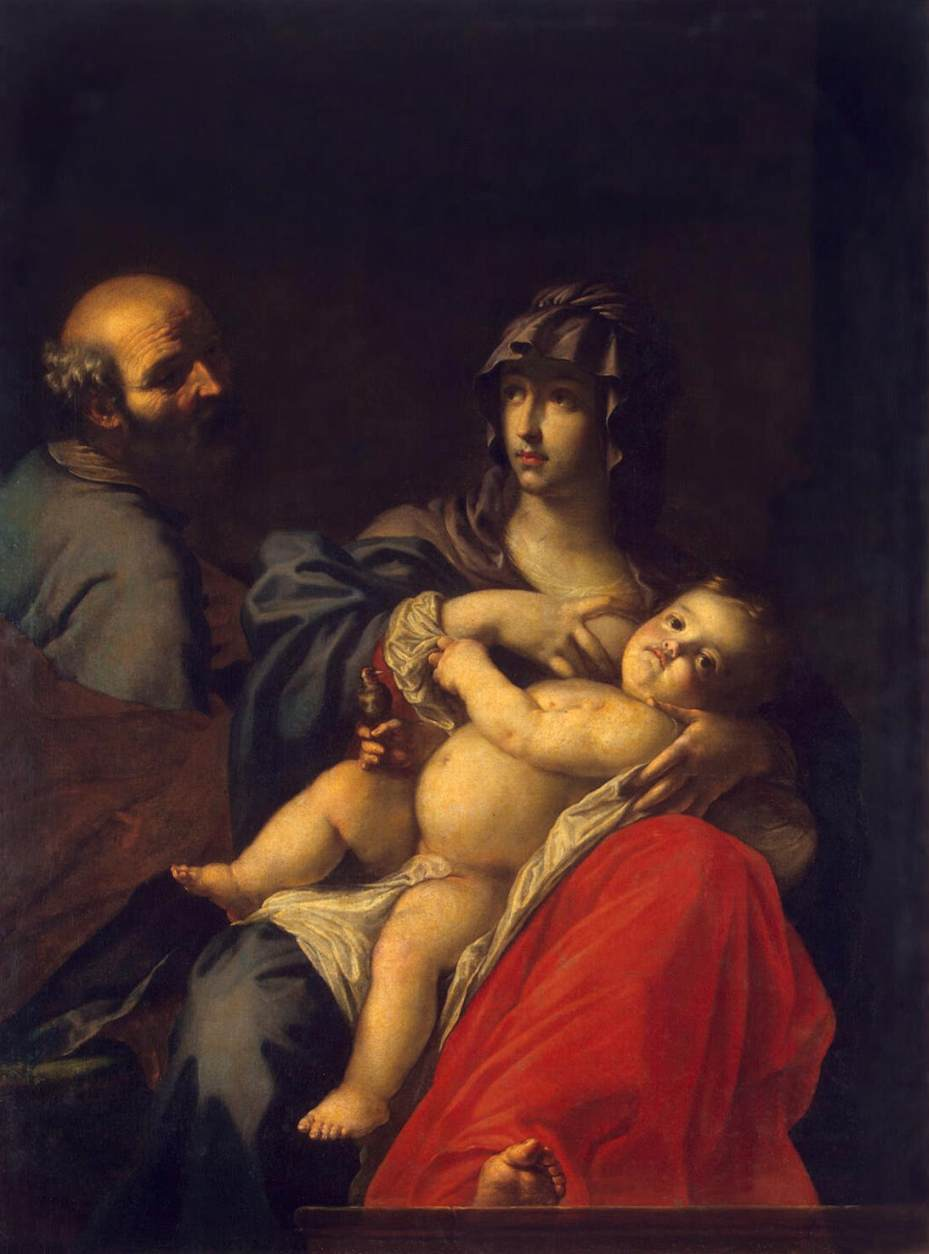
Holy Family

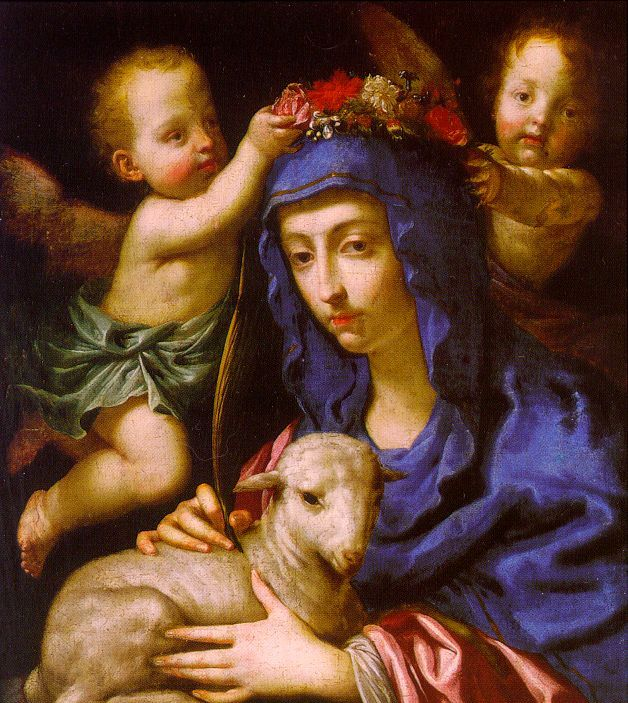
St Ines

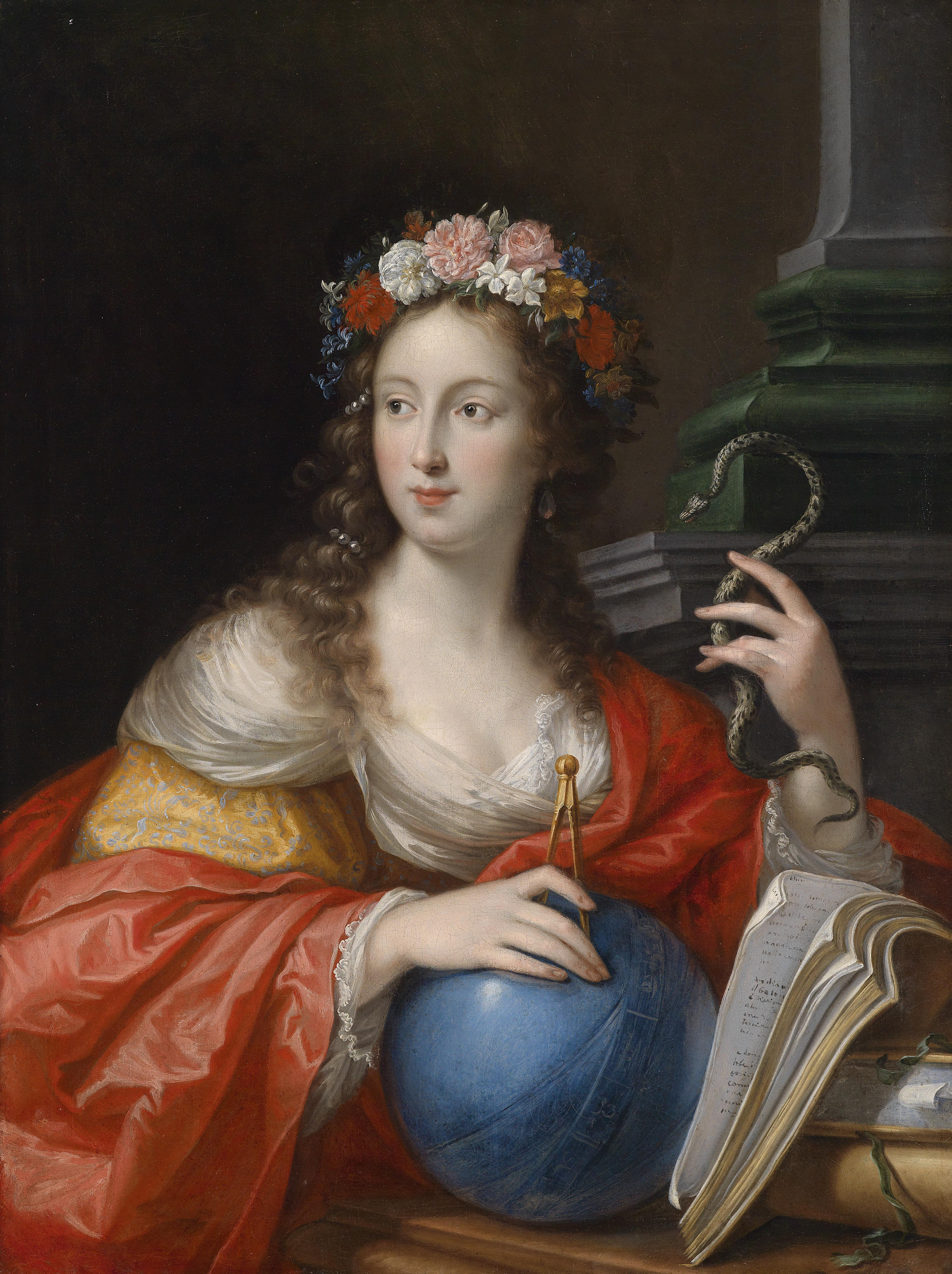
Allegory of Intelligence

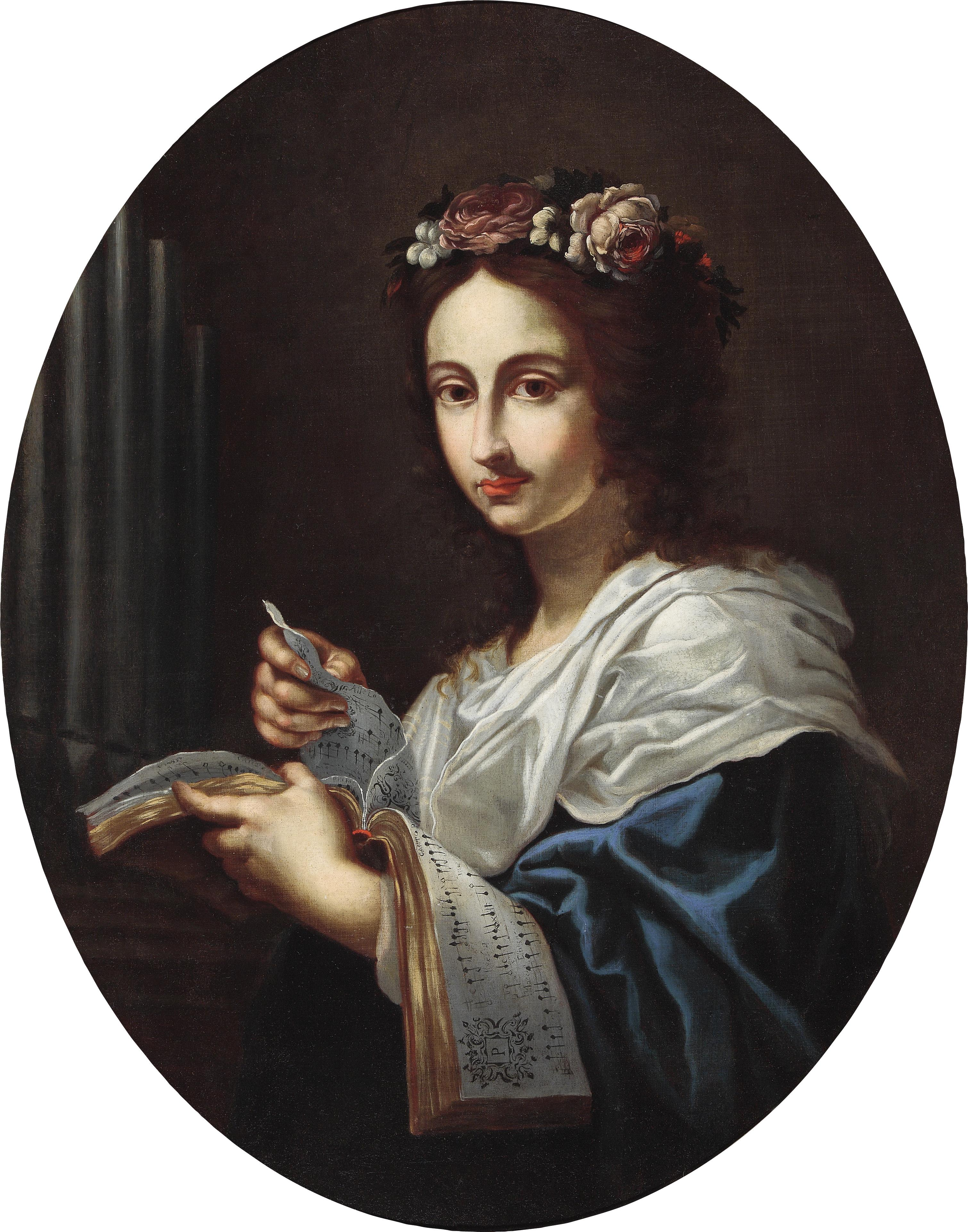
St Cecilia

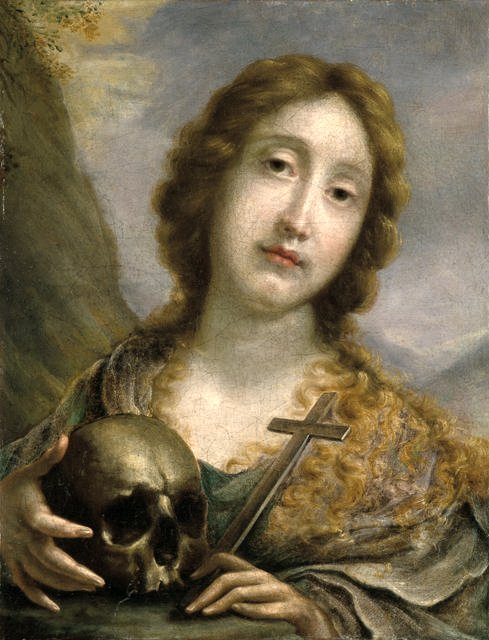
Penitent Magdalen

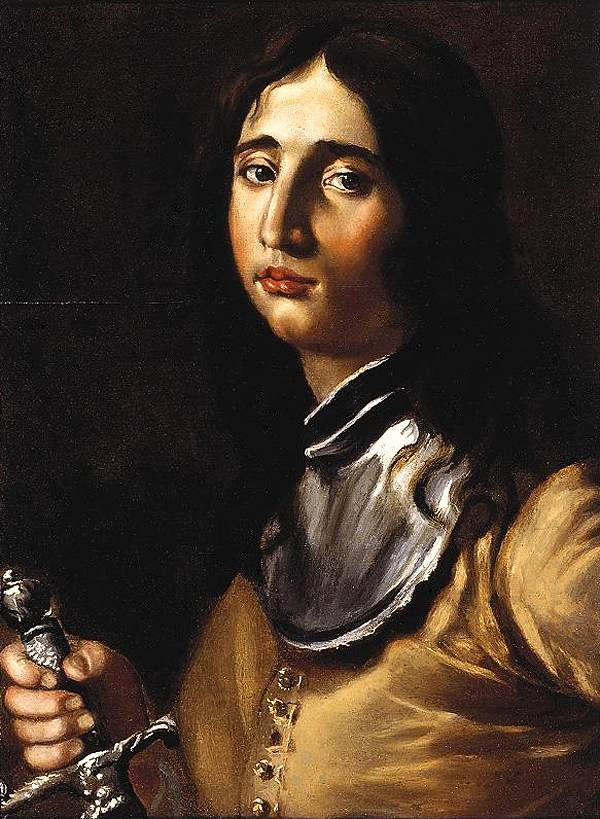
Youth with Spear

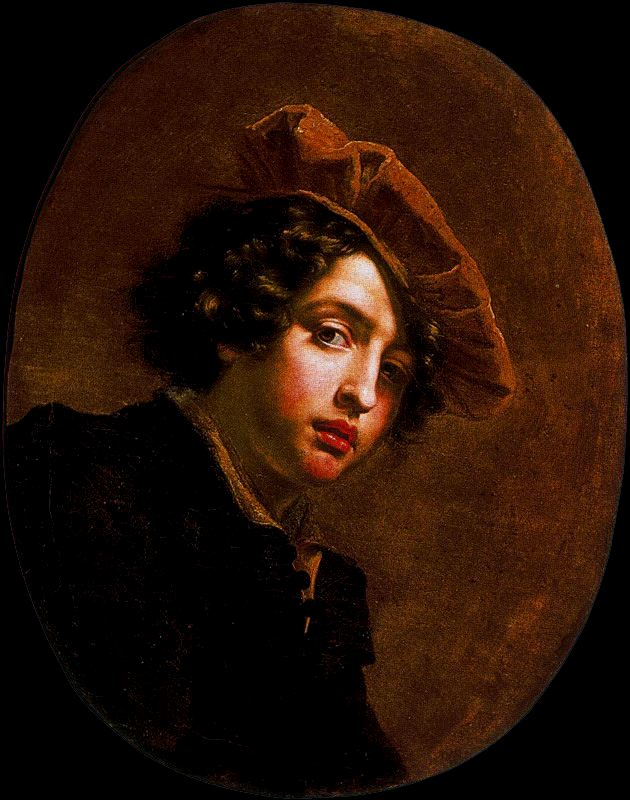
Youth

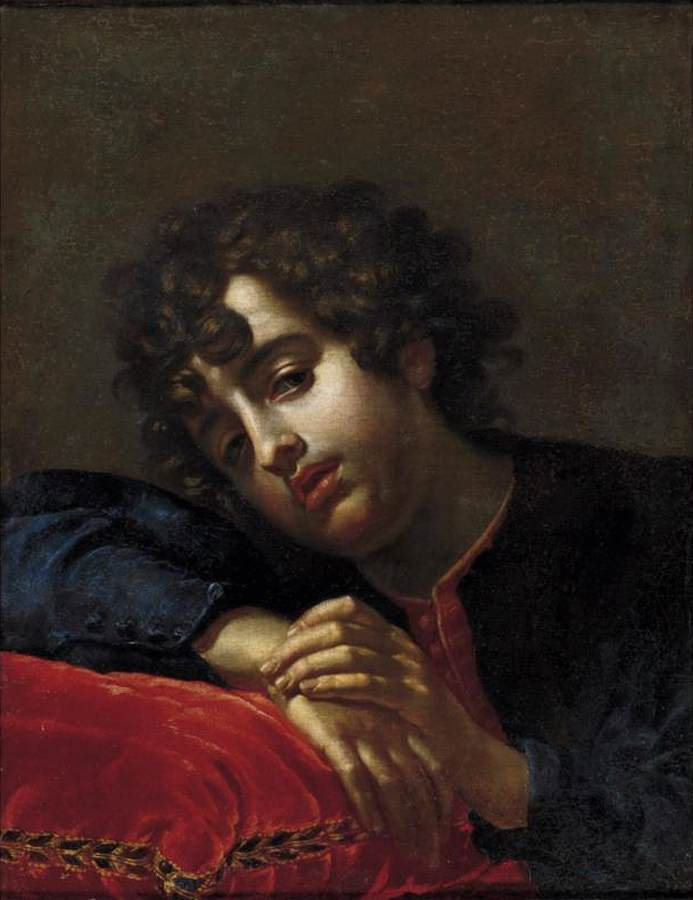
Youth

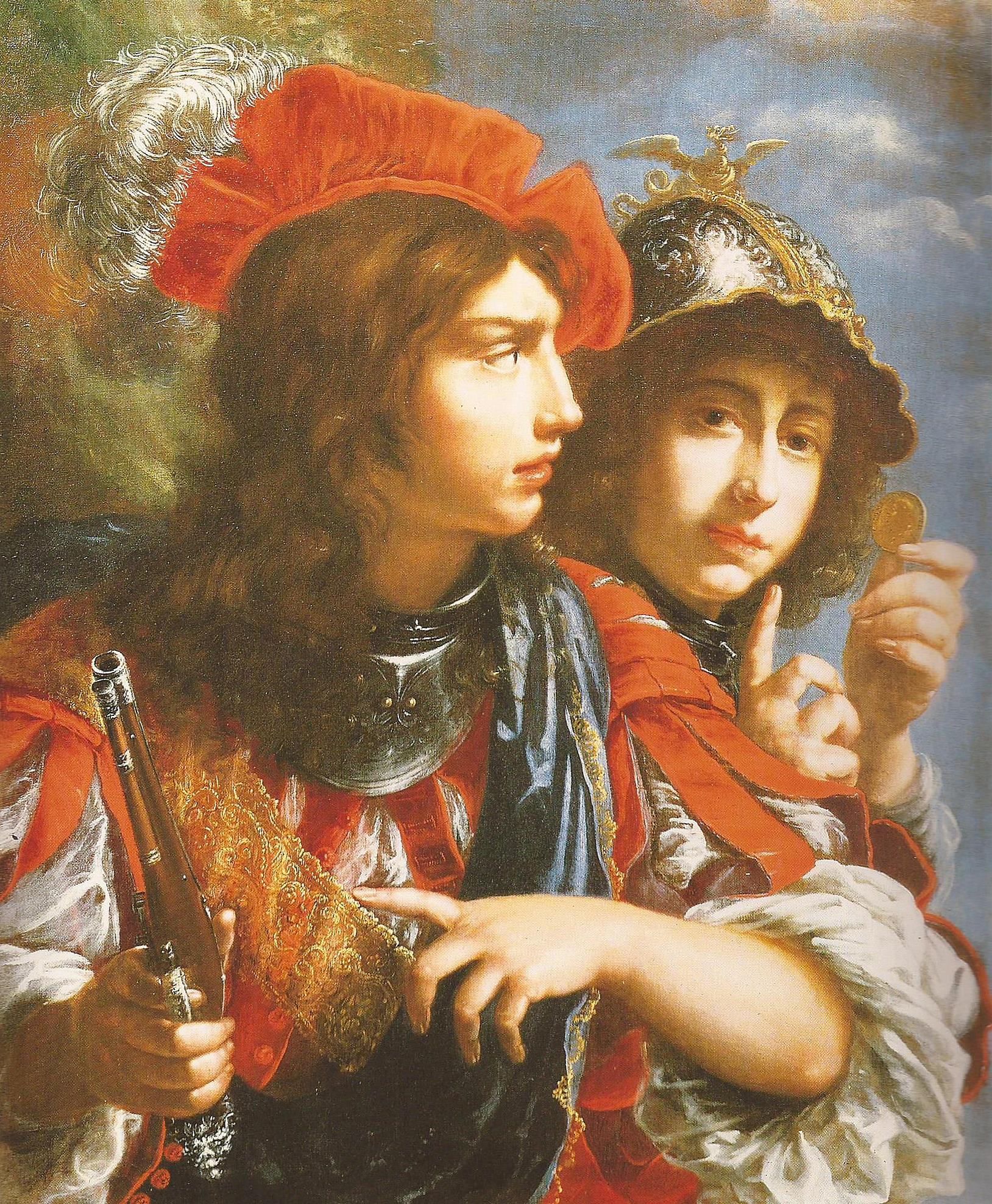
Deux braves

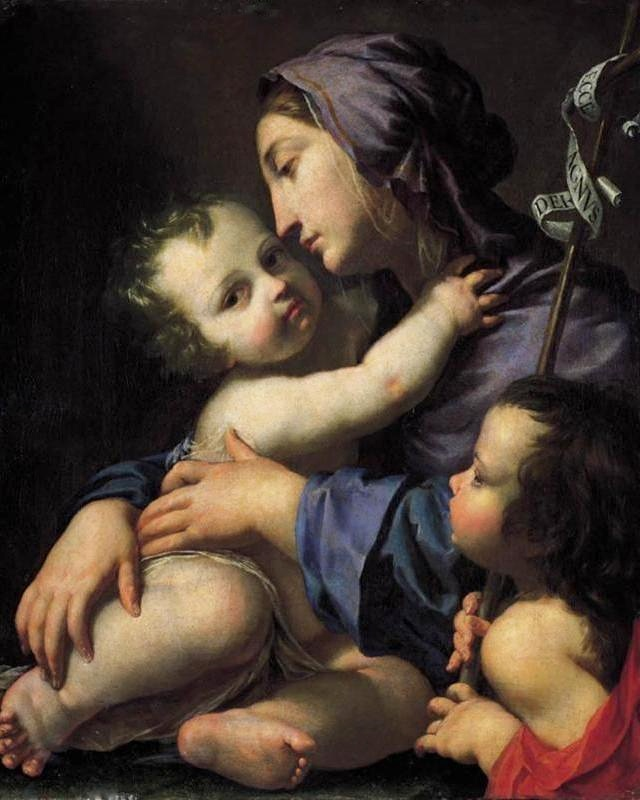
Mary with Jesus and Saint John the Baptist

== Sources ==
- Grove encyclopedia abstract
- biography
