= Allegory of Fortune =

Painting by Salvator Rosa

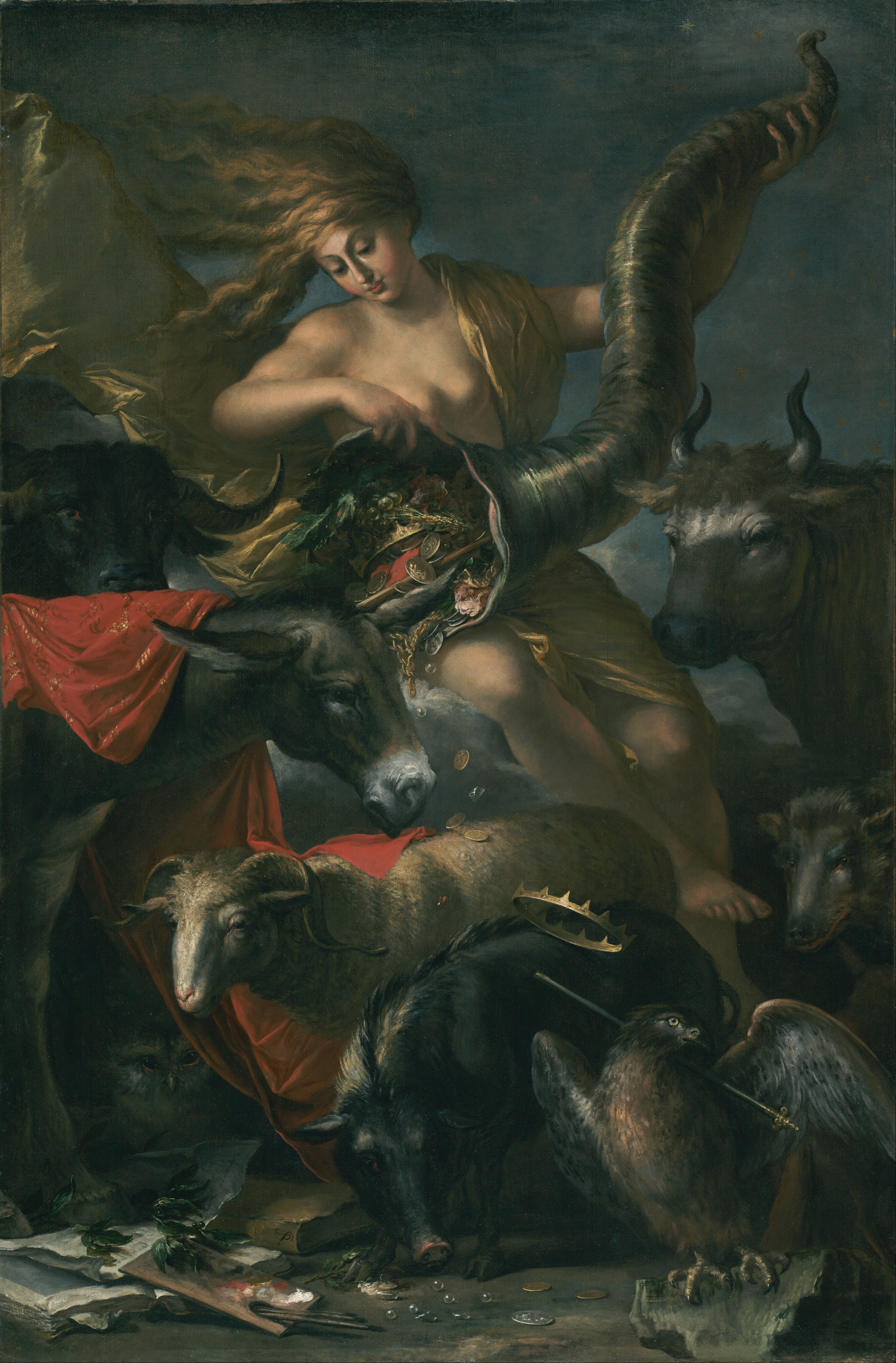
- Artist: Salvator Rosa
- Year: c. 1658–1659
- Medium: Oil painting on canvas
- Dimensions: 200.7 cm × 133 cm (79.0 in × 52 in)
- Location: J. Paul Getty Museum, Los Angeles

Allegory of Fortune, sometimes also named La Fortuna, is an oil painting on canvas featuring the Roman goddess of fortune, Fortuna, that was created c. 1658 or 1659 by the Italian baroque painter Salvator Rosa. The painting caused uproar when first exhibited publicly and almost got the painter jailed and excommunicated. Bearing initials but undated, it measures 200.7 by 133 centimetres (79.0 by 52.4 in). Rosa was known for his landscape paintings, but also worked in the sphere of mythology, witchcraft, portraits, and satire. Since 1978 it has been in the J. Paul Getty Museum in Brentwood, Los Angeles.

== Background ==
The painting was made at much the same time as Rosa penned Babilonia, a satirical condemnation of the papal court. (Note: Babilonia was the term Rosa used when referring to Rome.) According to art critic Brian Sewell, the target of the satirical painting could not be misinterpreted. Rosa's friends warned him after viewing it privately, that the painting should not be displayed openly as it was a satirical attack on Pope Alexander VII's patronage. In 1659, the painting was exhibited at the Pantheon, Rome, which almost resulted in Rosa being jailed and excommunicated. Only the intervention of the pope's brother, Don Marco Chigi, saved him from this humiliation.

Eventually, Rosa was convinced of the need to offer an explanation of the picture; he did this under the rubric of Manifesto and, according to art writer James Elmes, "proved that his hogs were not churchmen, his mules pretending pedants, his asses Roman nobles, and his birds and beasts of prey, the reigning despots of Italy."

An earlier painting of Fortune was undertaken by Rosa during the 1640s.

== Description ==
The overall dimensions of the undated oil on canvas are 200.7 by 133 centimetres (79.0 in × 52.4 in) wide; the initials "SR" inscribed on the book at the lower left represent the signature of the artist. The painting, sometimes referred to as La Fortuna, depicts Fortuna, the goddess of fortune and personification of luck, pouring her gifts on an array of undeserving animals. Traditionally Fortuna has her eyes covered and the vessel containing her favours, the horn of plenty or Cornucopia, is shown in an upright position; Rosa has reversed this tradition in his rendition and portrays Fortuna completely acquainted with where and on whom she is bestowing her gifts from the upended cornucopia.

Gemstones, coronets, a sceptre, gold coins, pearls, roses, together with grapes, cereal, and berries flow from the cornucopia onto the animals below. In turn the animals are stamping on the symbols of education, the arts, and knowledge. The donkey, the symbol of the pope, wearing a cardinal's red and gold coat as a drapery, is suppressing and casting a shadow on an owl, used here as the symbol for wisdom. The painting is expressing the artist's feelings of bitterness about the fact he lost the papal patronage, and thus Rosa included personal references: a rose signifies Rosa's name; a palette is placed on the book, and the book carries his initials. A pig stepping on a rose also symbolizes the same thing.

== Exhibitions and provenance ==
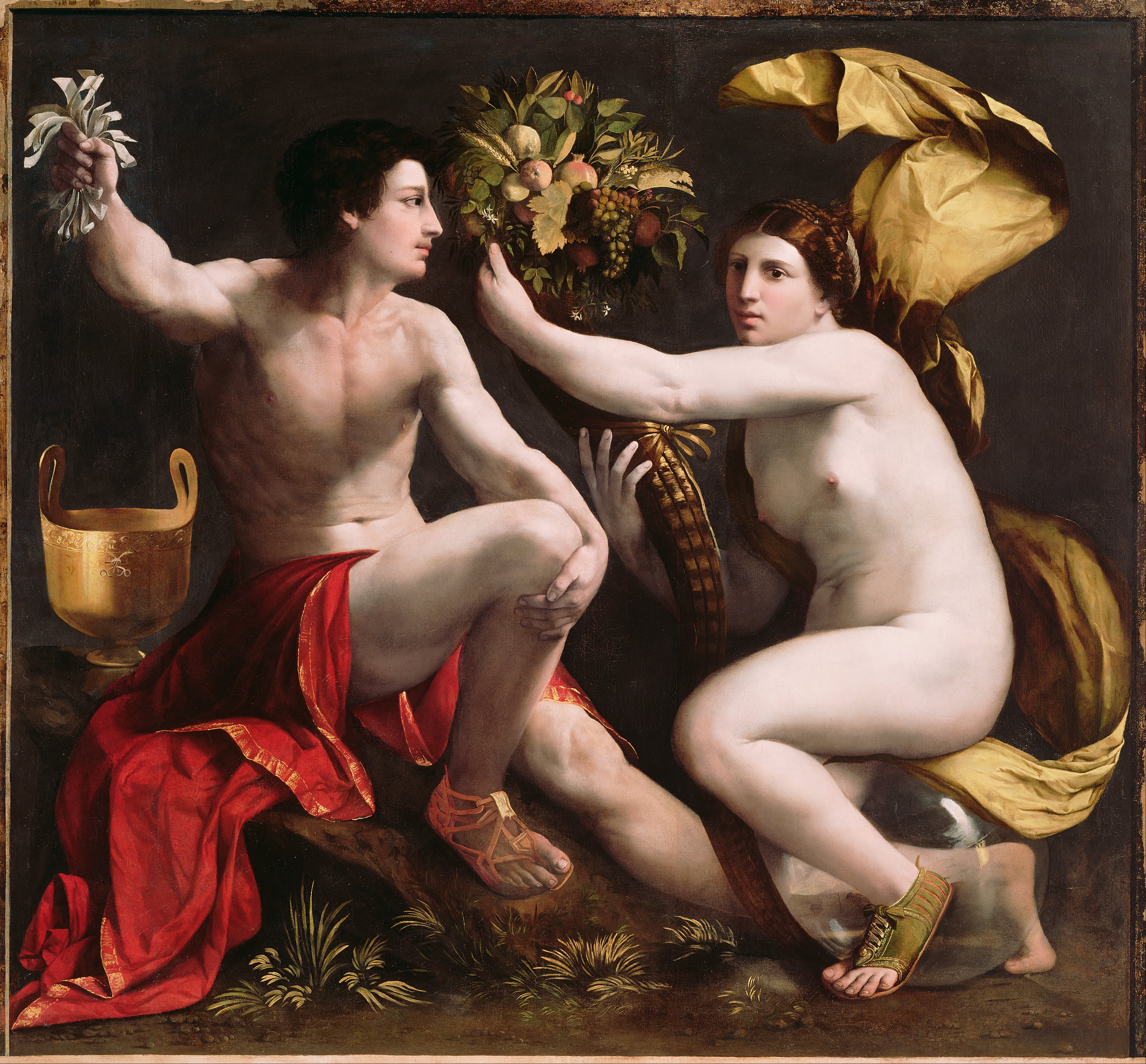
Dosso Dossi, Allegory of Fortune showing the cornucopia depicted upright, as usual

After being displayed in 1659, the painting was acquired by Carlo de Rossi and on his death in around 1683 became the property of Antonio Vallori.

It moved from Italy to England after Vallori sold it to Henry Scudamore, 3rd Duke of Beaufort in 1727 for six hundred scudi. The duke was completing a Grand Tour and purchased two Rosa paintings, the other one entitled, Nursing of Jupiter. Passed down by inheritance, the Fortune painting remained in the possession of the various Dukes of Beaufort until sold by the tenth duke in 1957, when it was purchased by the Marlborough Gallery. It was acquired by J. Paul Getty from the gallery in 1971. Until it passed to the Getty Museum in 1978 it was only exhibited three times: from 21 May 1827 at the Bristol Institution; at the British Institution in 1859; and as part of the J. Paul Getty Collection exhibition in the summer of 1972 at the Minneapolis Institute of Arts. In the twenty-first century it has been displayed as part of the Bandits, Wilderness and Magic exhibition firstly at Dulwich Picture Gallery in London during 2010 and at the Kimbell Art Museum in Texas from the end of December 2010 to March 2011.
