= Ottaviano Dandini =

Italian painter

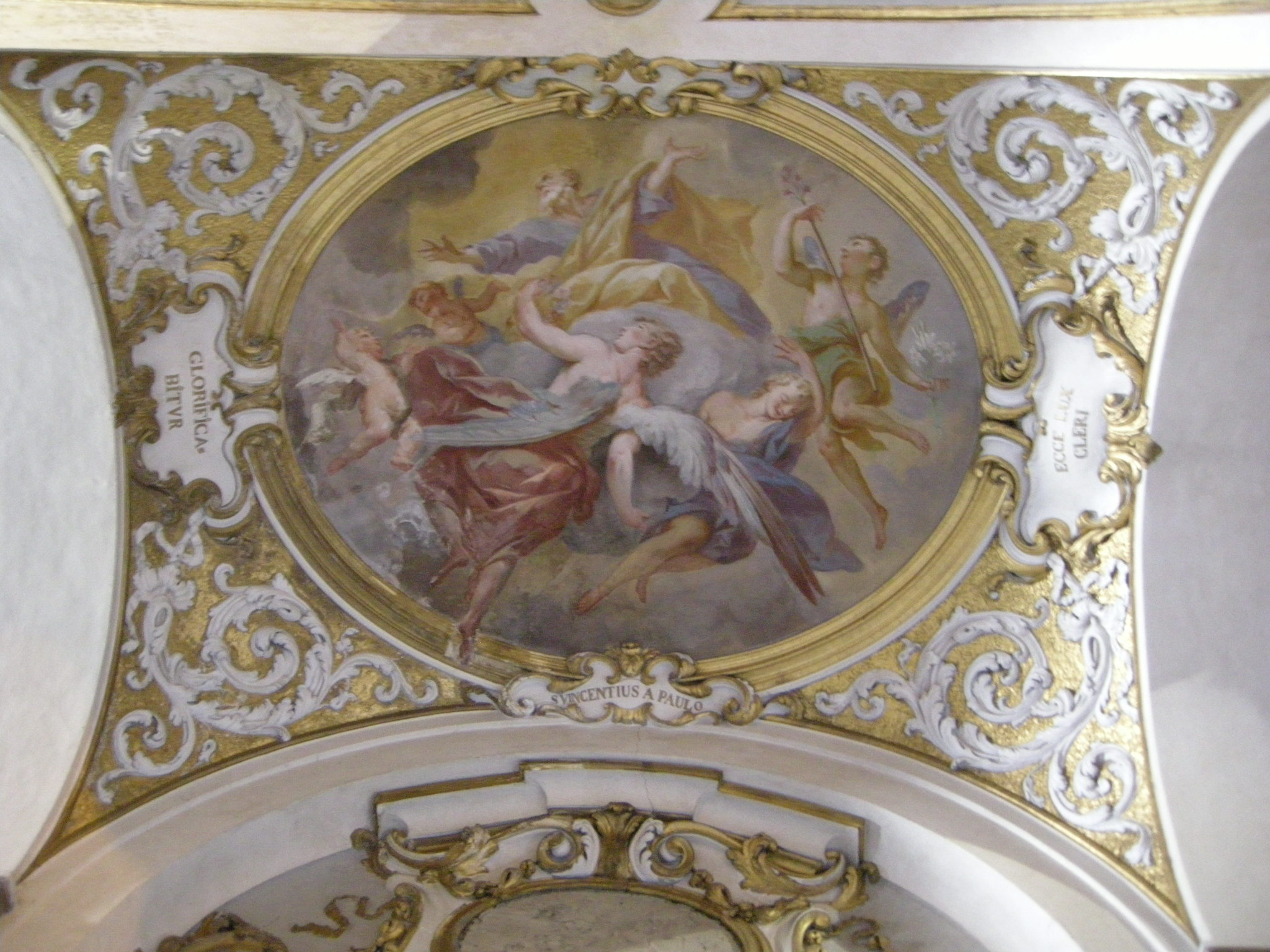
Glory of St Joseph, ceiling fresco of church of San Jacopo sopr'Arno, Florence

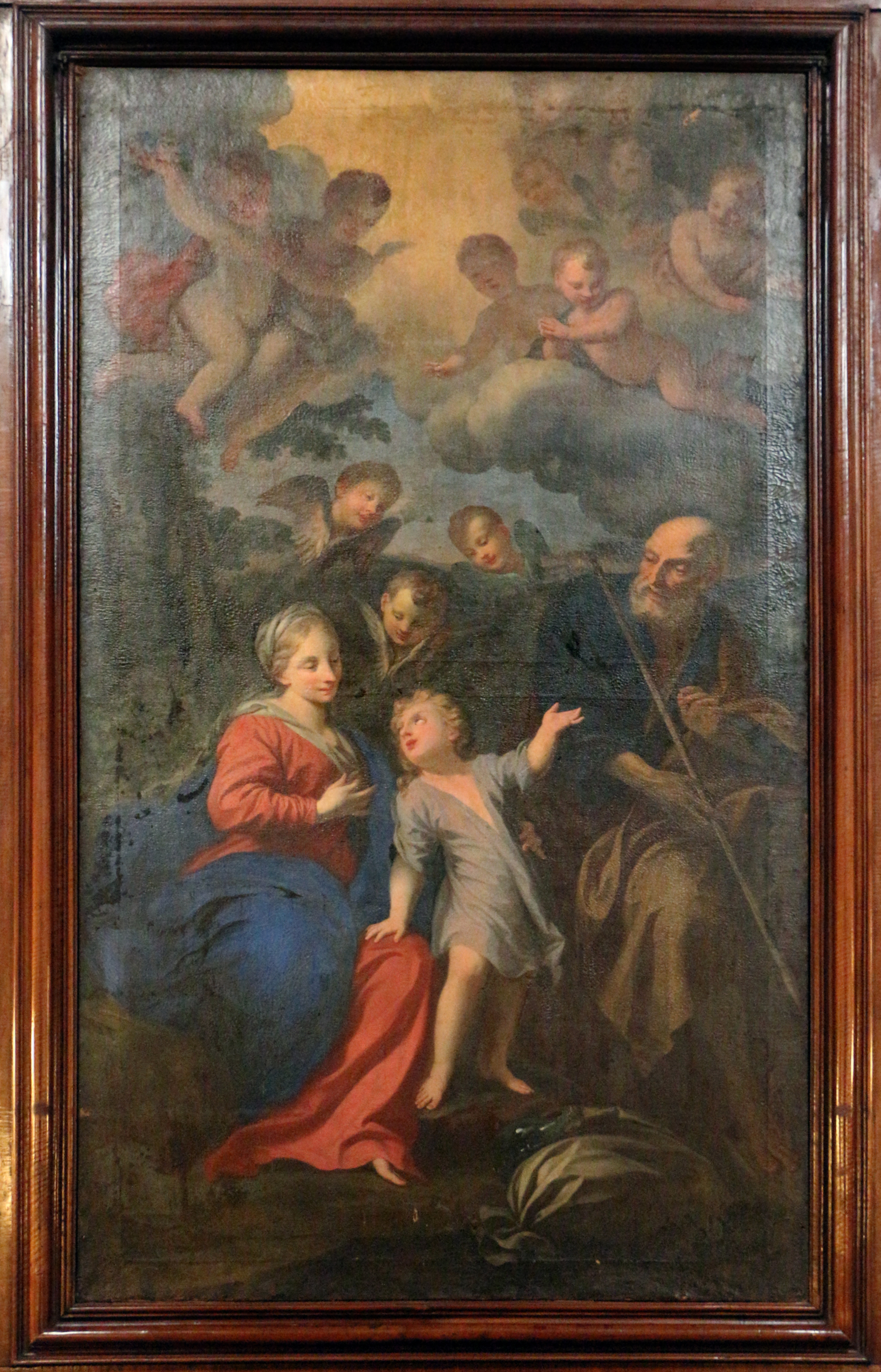
Rest during the flight into Egypt

Ottaviano Dandini was the son of Pietro Dandini, and painted history in the style of his father. Some fresco paintings in the cloister of San Spirito, a picture of several Saints in San Lorenzo, and his works in the church of the Magdalene at Pescia, evince the respectability of his talent. He afterward entered the Society of Jesus, and died 1740.
