= Villa d'Este =

Renaissance villa in Tivoli, Italy

Villa d'Este, Tivoli
UNESCO World Heritage Site
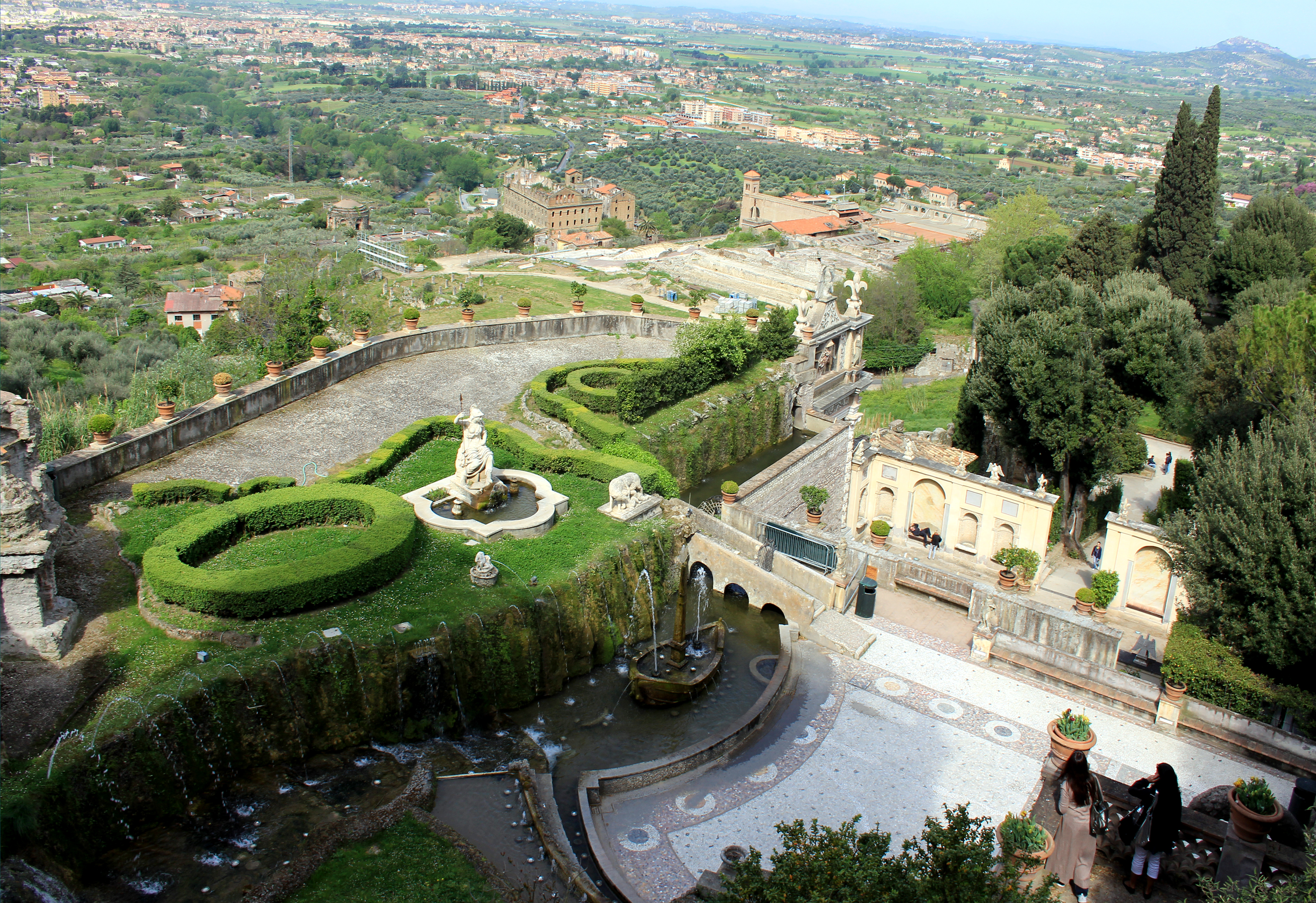
- Aerial view of Villa d'Este

- Location within Italy
- Interactive map of Villa d'Este, Tivoli
- Location: Tivoli, Italy
- Criteria: Cultural: i, ii, iii, iv, vi
- Reference: 1025
- Inscription: 2001 (25th Session)
- Area: 4.5 ha (11 acres)
- Buffer zone: 7 ha (17 acres)
- Website: villae.cultura.gov.it
- Coordinates: 41°57′45″N 12°47′46″E

The Villa d'Este is a 16th-century villa in Tivoli, near Rome. It is a masterpiece of Italian architecture and garden design, famous for its terraced hillside Italian Renaissance garden and the ingenuity of its architectural features (fountains, ornamental basins, ceilings, etc.), it is an incomparable example of a 16th-century Italian garden, which later had a huge influence on landscape design in Europe. It is now an Italian state museum, and is listed as a UNESCO World Heritage Site since 2001.

== History ==
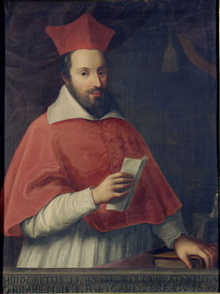
Cardinal Ippolito d'Este, creator of the Villa d'Este and its gardens

The Villa was commissioned by Cardinal Ippolito II d'Este (1509–1572), second son of Alfonso I d'Este, the Duke of Ferrara and grandson of Pope Alexander VI through his mother Lucrezia Borgia. The Este family had been lords of Ferrara since 1393, and were famous as patrons of the arts and of the humanist scholars of the Renaissance. As a second son, Ippolito was destined for a career in the church; he was named archbishop of Milan when he was only ten years old. At the age of 27, he was sent to the French court, where he became an advisor to the French King, Francis I, and in 1540 became a member of the King's Private Council. At the age of thirty, at the request of the King, Pope Paul III made d'Este a cardinal. Thanks to his ecclesiastical and royal connections, he became one of the wealthiest cardinals of the time, with an annual income estimated at 120,000 scudi. He was a lavish patron of the arts, supporting among others the sculptor Benvenuto Cellini, the musician Pierluigi da Palestrina and the poet Torquato Tasso. While his income was enormous, he was always in debt. The new French King, Henry II, sent him as an envoy to Rome, where he played a major role in the social and political life of the city. He appeared destined to become Pope and used all of his money and influence toward that goal, but at the time of the Reformation and the Council of Trent, his extravagant style of life worked against him. His first candidacy for the papal position, in 1549, with the support of the French King, was blocked by the Habsburg Emperor. D'Este promptly withdrew his own candidacy, endorsed the Habsburg candidate, and was rewarded by the College of Cardinals on December 3, 1549, with the lifetime position of Governor of Tivoli. This new title suited d'Este, because he was already a passionate collector of antiquities, and it gave him jurisdiction over the site of Hadrian's villa and other sites just being excavated. He did not give up his ambition to become Pope. He was five times a candidate for Pope, but was never selected.

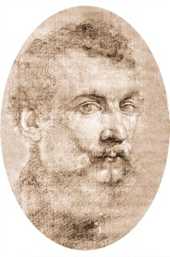
Pirro Ligorio, the artist and classical scholar who planned the themes and symbolism of the Villa and gardens

Tivoli had been a popular summer residence since ancient Roman times due to its altitude, cooler temperatures and its proximity to the Villa Hadriana, the summer residence of the Emperor Hadrian I. The position of Governor of Tivoli came with an official residence located in a former convent of the Benedictine order, which had been built in the 9th century on the site of an old Roman villa. In 1256 it had been donated to the Franciscan order. The residence was not large enough for the enormous household of a Cardinal as prominent as d'Este, but it did have an extensive view of the countryside below, including Hadrian's villa, and an abundant natural water supply for fountains and gardens. D'Este commissioned a prominent classical scholar, Pirro Ligorio, who had studied the Villa Hadriana and other Roman sites in the vicinity, to plan a new villa and garden which would exceed anything the Romans had built. He obtained an abundant supply of marble and statuary from the ruins of Hadrian's villa.

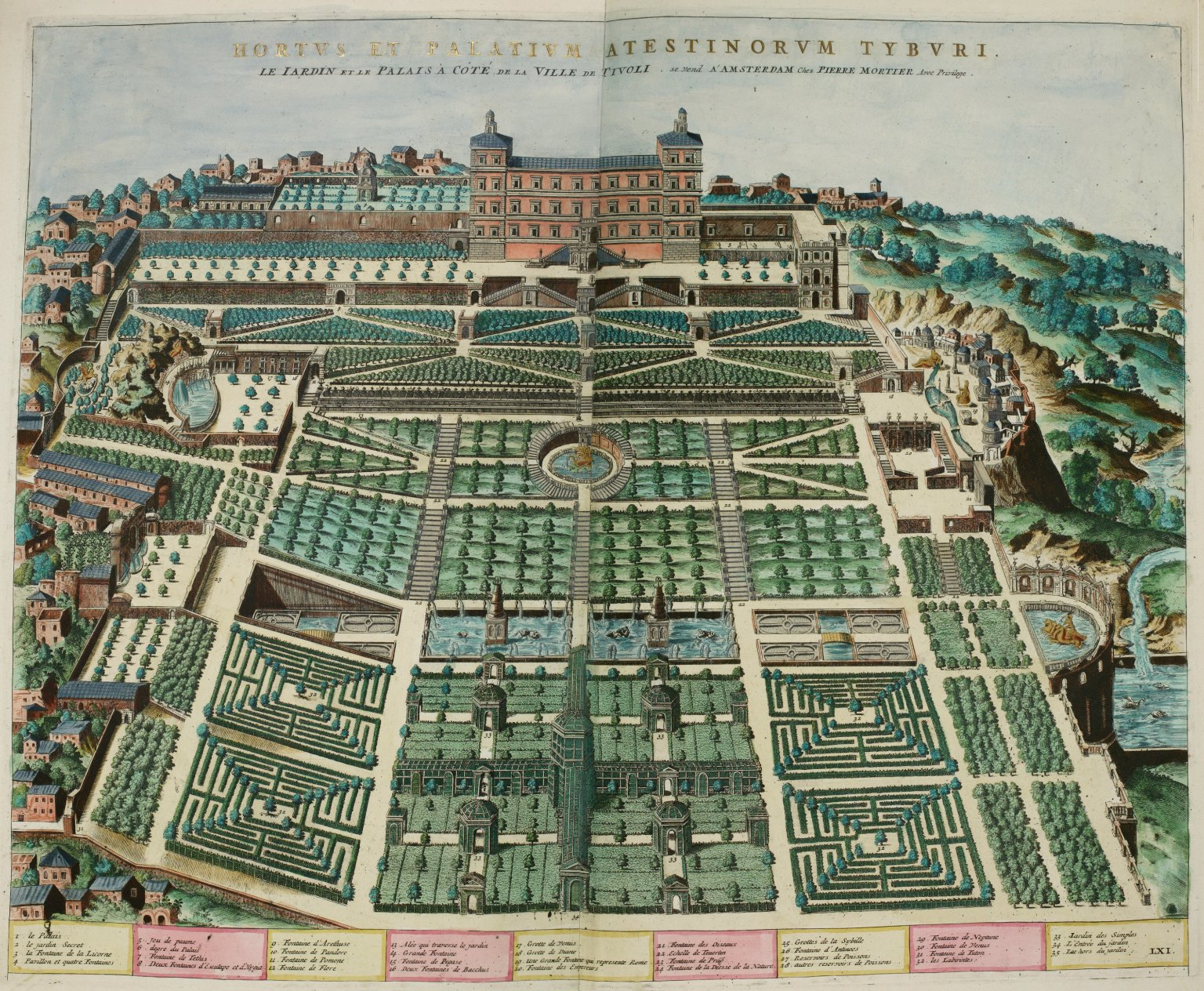
The Villa and gardens in 1560–1575

The land was acquired and construction was planned to begin at the end of 1550, but the Cardinal was distracted by various diplomatic missions; he was posted to northern Italy to resolve a war in Parma, then sent by Henry II on a mission to Sienna. He did not return to Tivoli until the summer of 1555. In September 1555, however, he was accused of simony by Pope Paul IV and exiled. The Pope died in 1559, and the new pontiff, Pope Pius IV, rehabilitated d'Este and restored his title as governor of Tivoli. Construction began when he returned in July 1560. More land was needed and acquired through 1569. The vast construction site required the demolition of houses, public buildings and roads. In 1568 the local residents filed twelve different lawsuits against the Cardinal, but did not deter him from his project. Between 1563 and 1565, a huge amount of earth was excavated and used to construct new terraces; arcades, grottos, niches, and nymphaeums. The nearby river Aniene was diverted to furnish water for the complex system of pools, water jets, channels, fountains, cascades and water games. The steep slope of the garden, more than 45 metres (148 ft) from top to bottom, posed special challenges. Canals were dug and 200 metres (660 ft) of underground pipes were laid to carry the water from the artificial mountain under the oval fountain to the rest of the garden. Following the aesthetic principles of the Renaissance, the garden was carefully divided into regular units, or compartments, each 30 metres (98 ft) across, laid out along a longitudinal median axis, with five lateral axes.

The plans for the villa itself were carried out under the direction of the Ferrarese architect-engineer Alberto Galvani, court architect of the Este. The chief painter of the ambitious internal decoration was Livio Agresti from Forlì. In 1565 and 1566, work began on the decoration of the interior of the villa. The decoration was carried out by a team of painters under Girolamo Muziano and Federico Zuccari. In 1566, the Cardinal made his fifth effort to be elected Pope, but once again he was defeated, and he was excluded by the new pontiff, Pope Pius V, from any more official appointments. He turned more and more of his attention to the decoration of his villa. New teams of painters and stucco workers labored on the task between 1567 and 1572, under the direction of Girolamo Muziano, Livio Agresti, Cesare Nebbia, Durante Alberti, Metteo Neroni, and Federico Zuccari. The painters were joined by sculptors Giovan Battista della Porta. Pirrino del Galgliardo, Gillis van den Vliete, Giovanni Malanca, and Pierre de la Motte. They were joined by ceramists and mosaic artists, as well as fountain engineers, led by Pirro Ligorio, the original designer of the project, who returned to finish the work in 1567–68.

The frantic work on the project began to slow in 1569, probably due to the financial difficulties of the Cardinal, who had no more hope of being elected Pope and had lost his lucrative French positions. He spent more and more of his time in the villa, reading and meeting with the leading poets, artists and philosophers of the Renaissance. In the summer of 1572, he entertained one last important guest, Pope Gregory XIII. To prepare for the visit, the Cardinal redecorated the top floors of the villa and rushed completion of the dragon fountain. The reception for the Pope cost him more than five thousand scudi forcing him to pawn his silver and other precious objects. Soon after the reception, on December 2, 1572, the Cardinal died in Rome, and was buried in a simple tomb in the church adjoining the Villa.

=== In later years ===
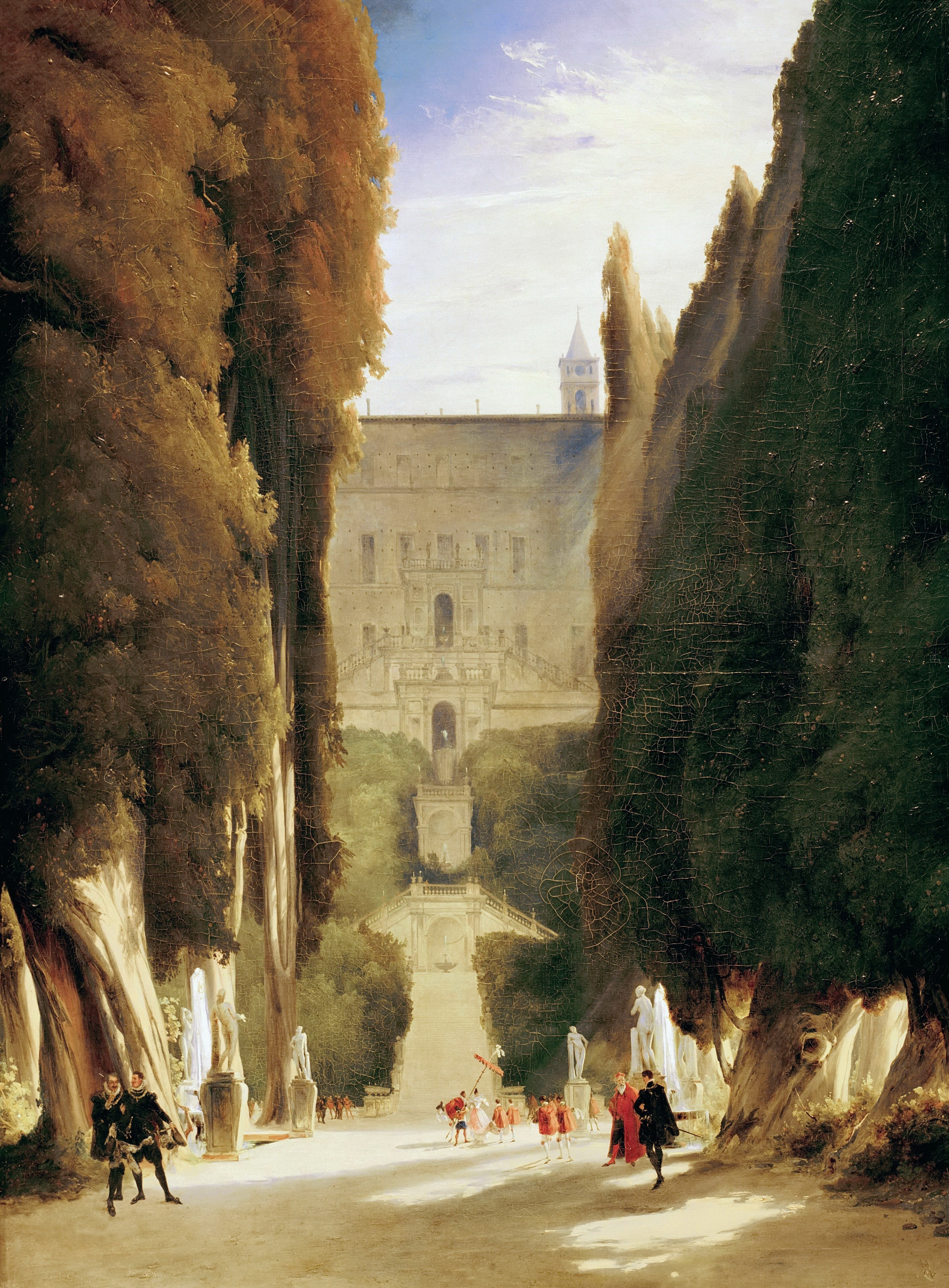
Park of the Villa d'Este, Carl Blechen, 1830. The overgrown garden appealed to the Romantic imagination; today this same view is once again manicured.

With the death of Ippolito in 1572, the villa and gardens passed to his nephew, Cardinal Luigi (1538–1586), who continued work on some of the unfinished fountains and gardens, but struggled with high maintenance costs. After his death in 1586, the villa was owned by the Cardinal Deacons of the Sacred College, who did little to maintain it. In 1599 it returned to the Este family with the nomination of Cardinal Alessandro d'Este (1538–1624). Alessandro had the energy and ambition of his ancestor and carried out a major renovation of the gardens and water systems, as well as building a new system of fountains in the lower garden. He also persuaded Pope Gregory XV to formally grant ownership of the villa to the Este family. His successors, the Dukes of Modena, made further additions to the gardens. Francesco I (1629–1641) restored many of the crumbling structures and began planting trees in the previously unshaded gardens. Cardinal Rinaldo I commissioned two new fountains by Gian Lorenzo Bernini in 1660–61. However, after 1695, the Este family was unable to support the high cost of maintaining the villa, which they rarely used and which produced no income. The villa went into a long decline. After 1751, the furnishings were sent to Modena, and the antique sculpture was gradually removed from the gardens and sold to collectors. In 1796, the House of Habsburg took possession of the villa, after Ercole III d'Este bequeathed it to his daughter Maria Beatrice, married to Grand Duke Ferdinand of Habsburg. It was largely neglected and was twice occupied by French soldiers, who took away much of the decoration that remained.

Between 1850 and 1896, the villa was owned by Cardinal Gustav von Hohenlohe, who restored the dilapidated villa and the ruined and overgrown gardens, which now appealed to the romantic sentiments of the period. The villa once again attracted artists, musicians and writers. The composer Franz Liszt made several visits between 1865 and 1885, and wrote three pieces of piano music, two musical "threnodies" with the title "Aux cyprès de la Villa d'Este" and the character piece "Les jeux d'eau à la Villa d'Este," that depict the grounds. They were placed in the "third year" of his Années de pèlerinage. The latter includes some of the most influential evocations of the play of water ever written for piano.

After the First World War, the villa was acquired by the Italian State, which began a major restoration in 1922. The villa was refurnished with paintings from the storerooms of the Galleria Nazionale, Rome. It suffered bomb damage in 1944 during World War II, and many of the walls were degraded in postwar years by environmental pollution, but campaigns of restoration and protection have preserved intact the famous features of the villa and gardens. Jean Garrigue's volume of poems A Water Walk by Villa d'Este (1959) was inspired by the gardens. Kenneth Anger filmed Eaux d'Artifice among the water features of the garden. The water organ, which had not functioned for many years, was restored and now plays again each day for visitors.

== Villa ==
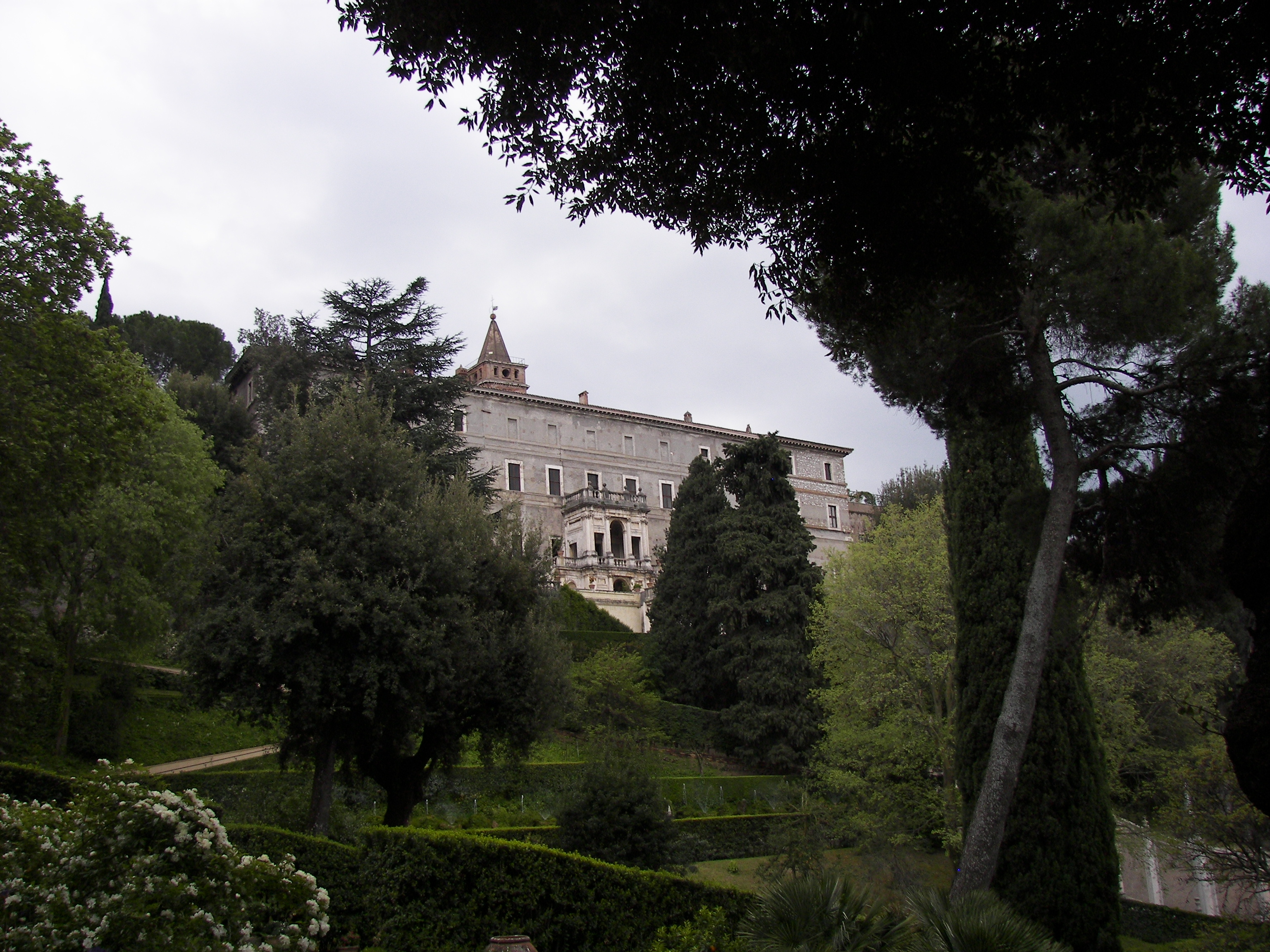
The Villa seen from the gardens

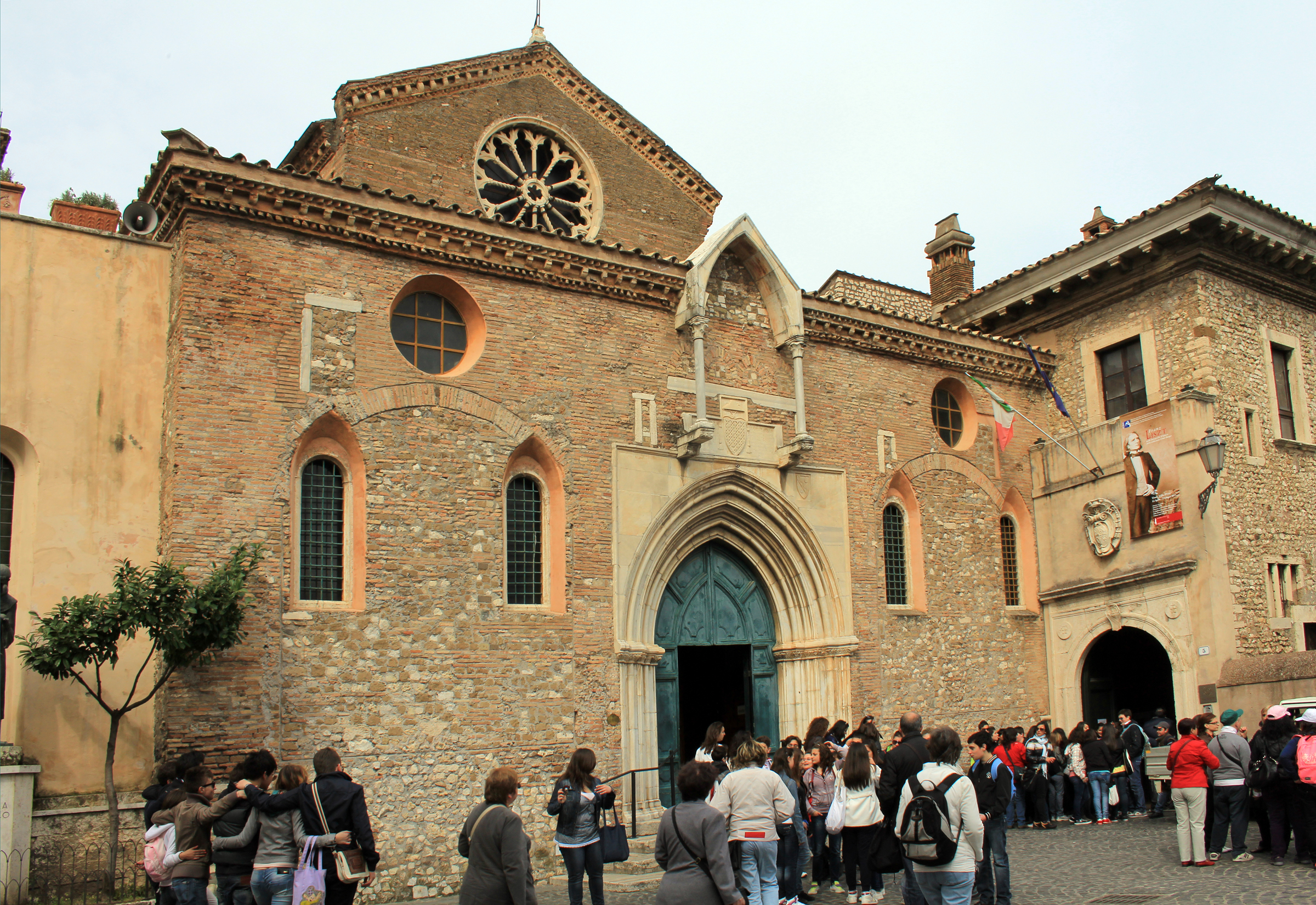
The modest modern entrance to the Villa, next to the Church of Santa-Maria Maggiore

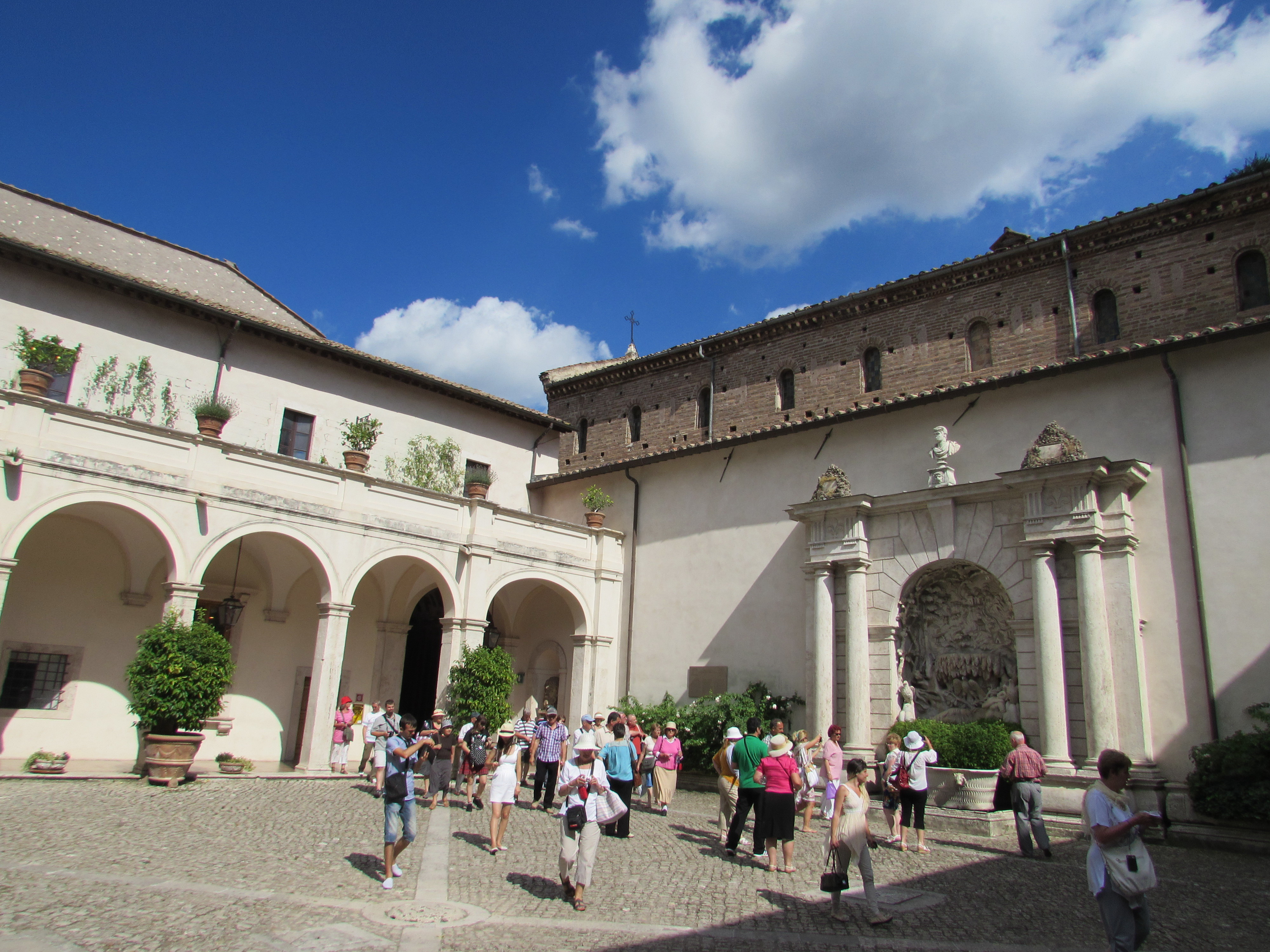
The Courtyard of the Villa was originally the cloister of the convent

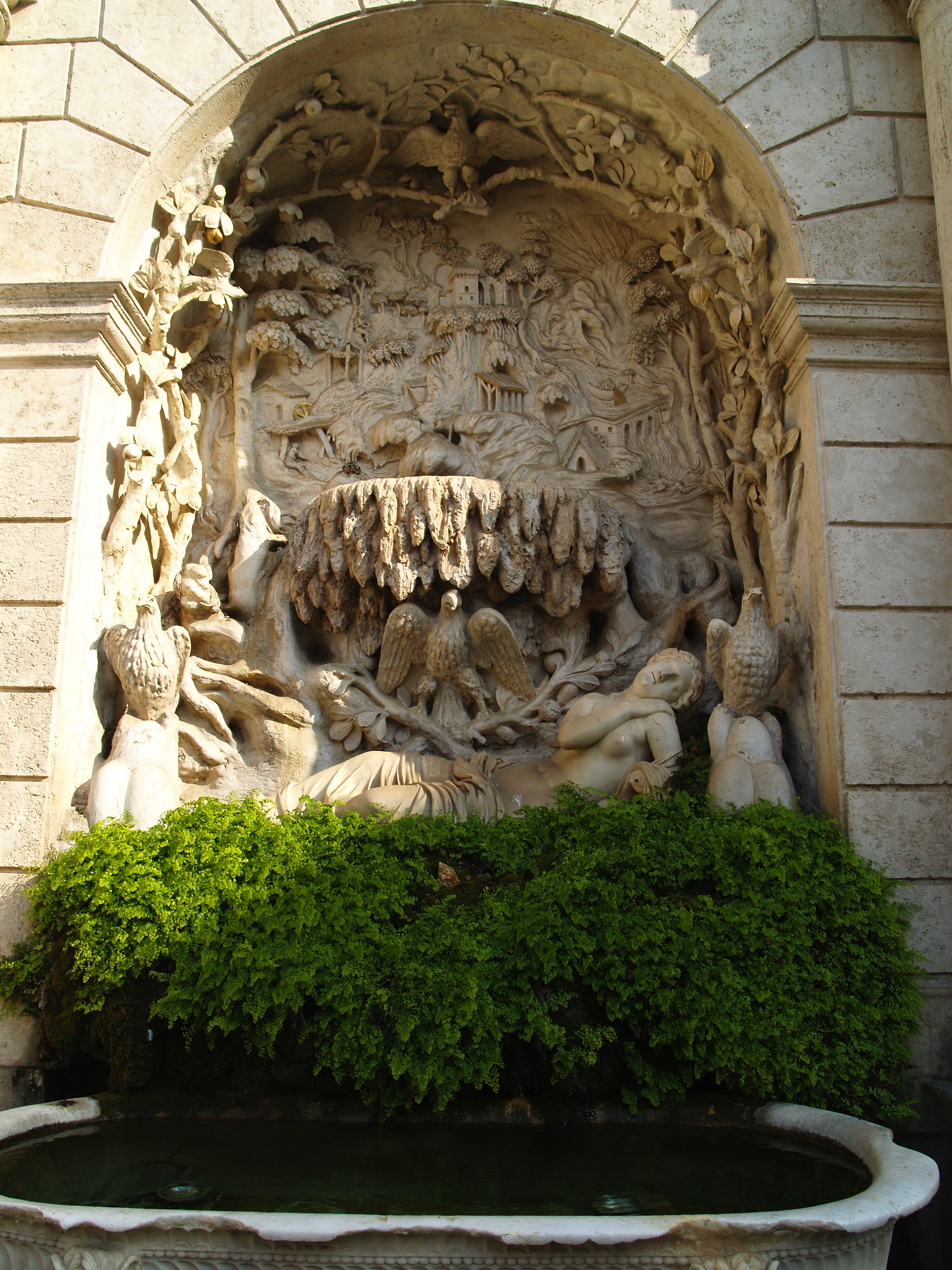
The Fountain of Venus in the courtyard retains its original appearance

Today the villa is entered from a doorway on the Piazza Trento, next to the entrance of the Church of Santa-Maria Maggiore. In the time of Ippolito d'Este, this entrance was rarely used; visitors arrived at the bottom of the gardens, and ascended, step by step, to the villa, viewing the fountains and statuary. The current door dates to 1521, to the period before Ippolito. The foyer inside the door has a painted vault which was once covered with paintings, which were largely destroyed by the bombing during World War II. It was decorated with monochrome scenes from the Old Testament, a few of which, including The Sacrifice of Isaac, still can be seen. They date to the period between 1563 and 1565, and were probably designed by Girolamo Muziano. The next room, the Hall of the Stories of Solomon, shows scenes from life of King Solomon, set in frames painted to resemble marble. They also are attributed to Muziano and his craftsmen, also from about 1565. A massive head of travertine stone is on display here, which until the 18th century was in the garden.

The Courtyard is placed where the original cloister of the convent was located. It was constructed in 1566–67, and is surrounded by a gallery. The centrepiece of the courtyard is the Fountain of Venus, the only fountain in the Villa which retains its original appearance and decoration. The fountain, designed by Raffaelo Sangallo in 1568–69, is framed by two doric columns, and crowned by a 4th-century marble bust of the Emperor Constantine. The central element of the fountain is a Roman statue of a sleeping Venus, made in the 4th or 5th centuries A.D. Water originally poured from a vase beside her into a Roman labrum of white marble (2nd century AD) decorated with two lion heads. The fountain is surrounded on three sides by a sixteenth-century courtyard sited on the former Benedictine cloister. The fountain on a side wall contains a grotto and a figure which follows a Hellenistic prototype most familiar in the Sleeping Ariadne of the Vatican. The grotto, epitomized by the high-relief stalactites, identifies her as the resident nymph, or genius loci, though guidebooks sometimes call her a Venus. The base of the fountain is decorated with a stucco bas relief which was once gilded, and portrays the white heraldic eagles of the D'Este. It illustrates the course of the river flowing from Mount Sant'Angelo to the Villa. The sculptural decoration around the courtyard, particularly the representation of quince trees, illustrates the 11th labor of Hercules; the theft of golden apples from the Garden of the Hesperides, where they were guarded by the dragon Ladone. Hercules was reputed to be a protector of the Tiburtine region where the villa is located, and also was claimed as an ancestor of the d'Este family.

=== Apartments of the Cardinal ===
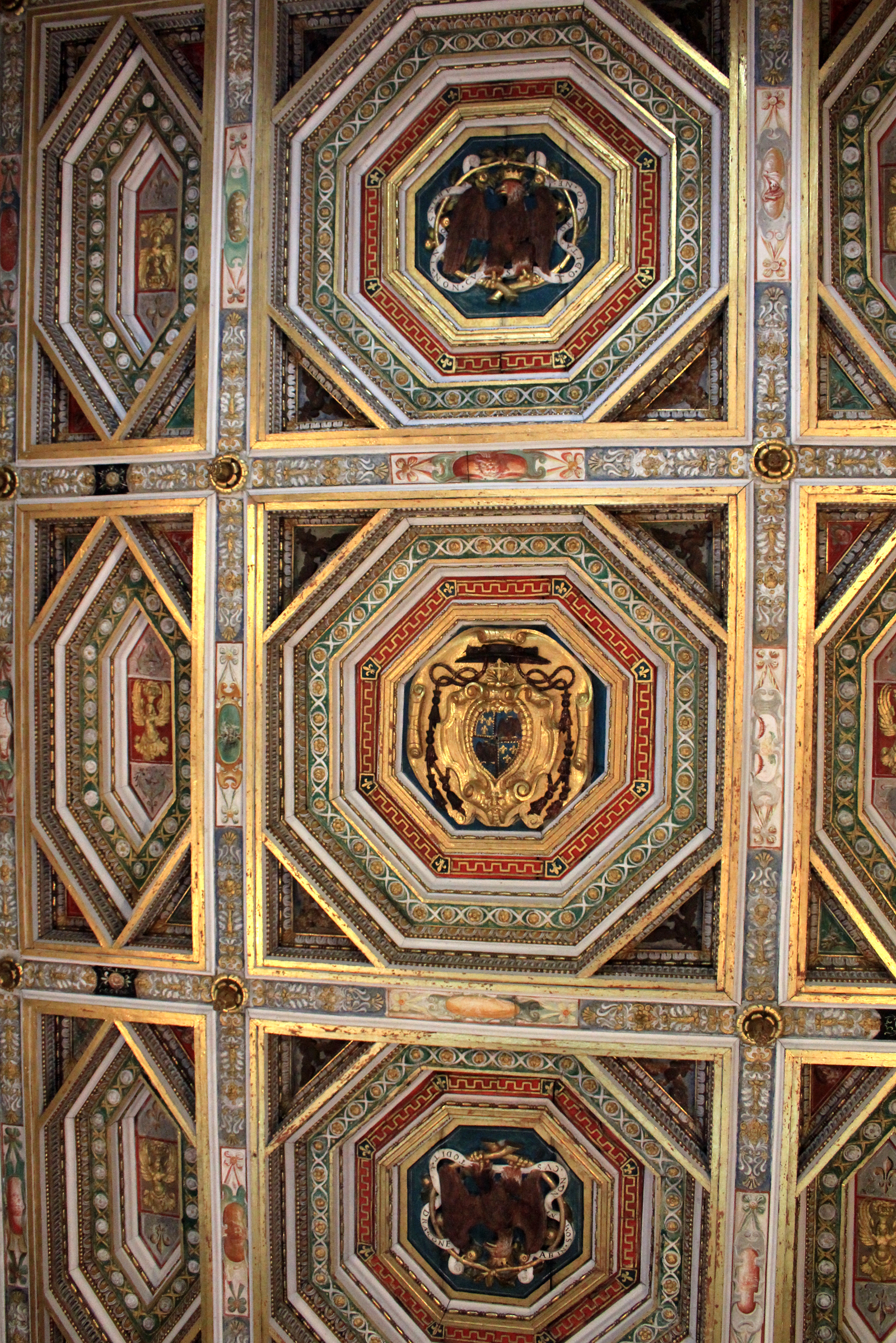
Detail of the wooden ceiling in the bed chamber of Ippolito d'Este

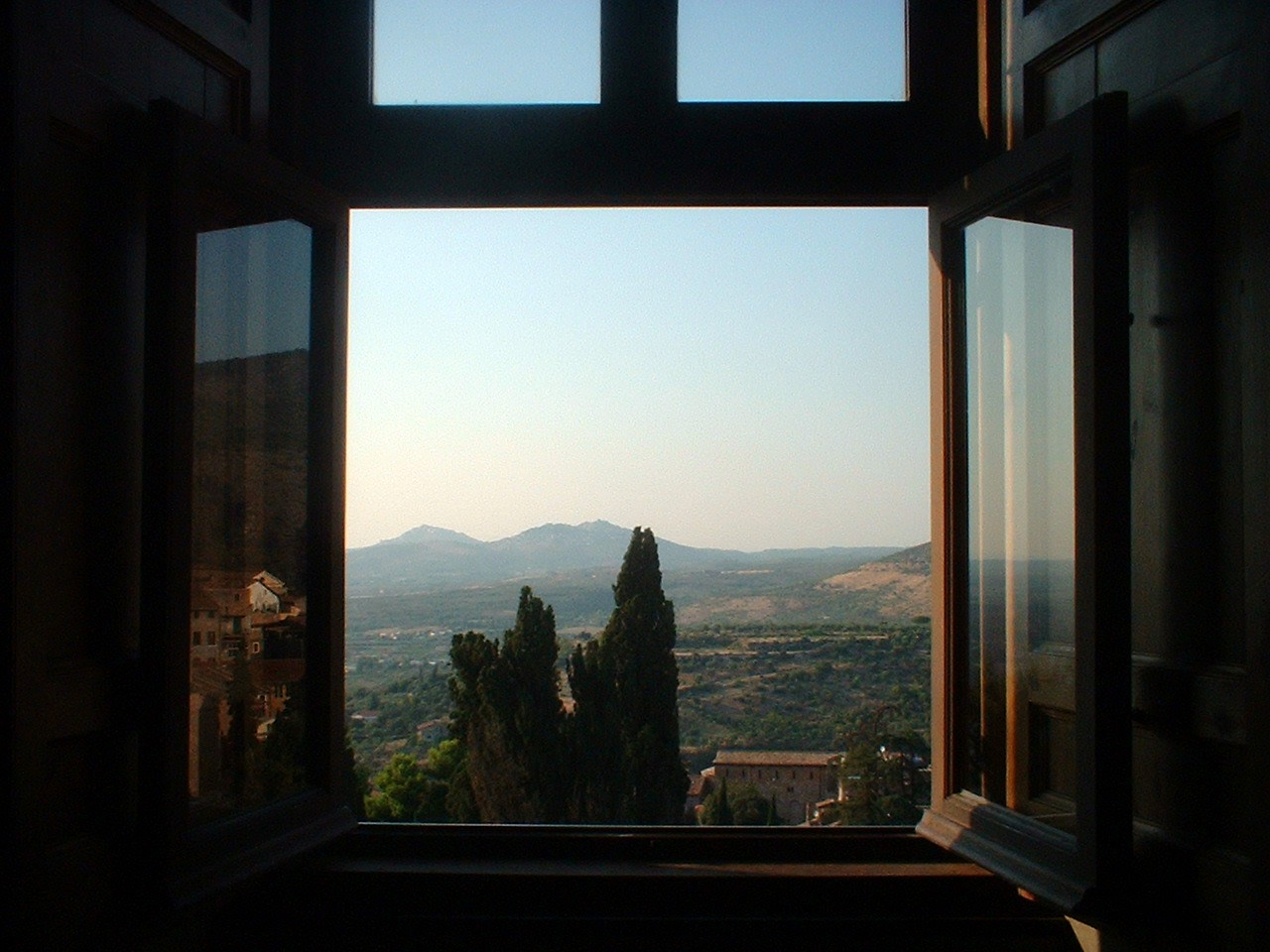
The view from the apartments of the Cardinal

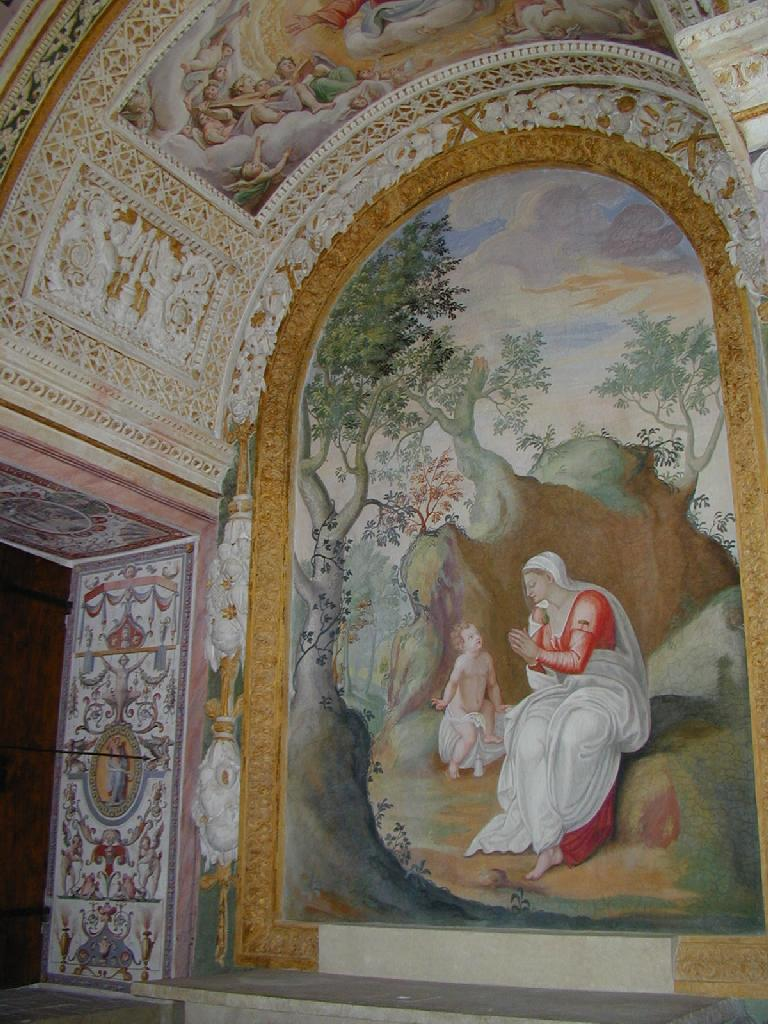
The private chapel of the Cardinal

The Salon on the ground floor is the first room of the personal apartments of Ippolito; it was used for receptions, and features an extensive view of the garden below and countryside beyond, including Villa of Hadrian. The walls, bare today, were covered with leather decorated with gold and green designs and the eagles of the d'Este family. The vaulted ceiling of the room is still covered with a frieze and frescoes on the theme of virtue, painted in twenty different personifications. These were designed by Livio Agresti in 1568, and created by a team of artists. and stucco-makers. Other themes include landscapes with ruined temples, inspired by the Tiburtine countryside.

A small antechamber next to the salon has a frieze and vault is decorated with more personifications of virtue, and leads to the Cardinal's Bedroom, which was constructed in 1576. The bedroom walls were originally covered with leather painted with gold and silver. The coffered wooden ceiling is the most notable feature of the room, gilded and painted with the Este crest. an eagle surrounded by quince branches, a bishop's hat and the motto of the Este family, ab insomni non custodita dracone, a verse from Ovid referring to the dragon guarding the gardens of the Hesperides. Feminine figures representing different aspects of virtue occupy the corners of the room. The private apartment is completed by a library and by a small chapel, whose walls are decorated with frescoes of mixture of classical and Christian symbolism, Sibyls and of prophets, and whose ceiling vault features a fresco of the coronation of the Virgin Mary. The apartment also connects by doorways with Pirro Ligorio's classical Gran Loggia on the garden facade of the house, based on the terrace below and designed in the form of a great triumphal arch.

=== Lower floor ===
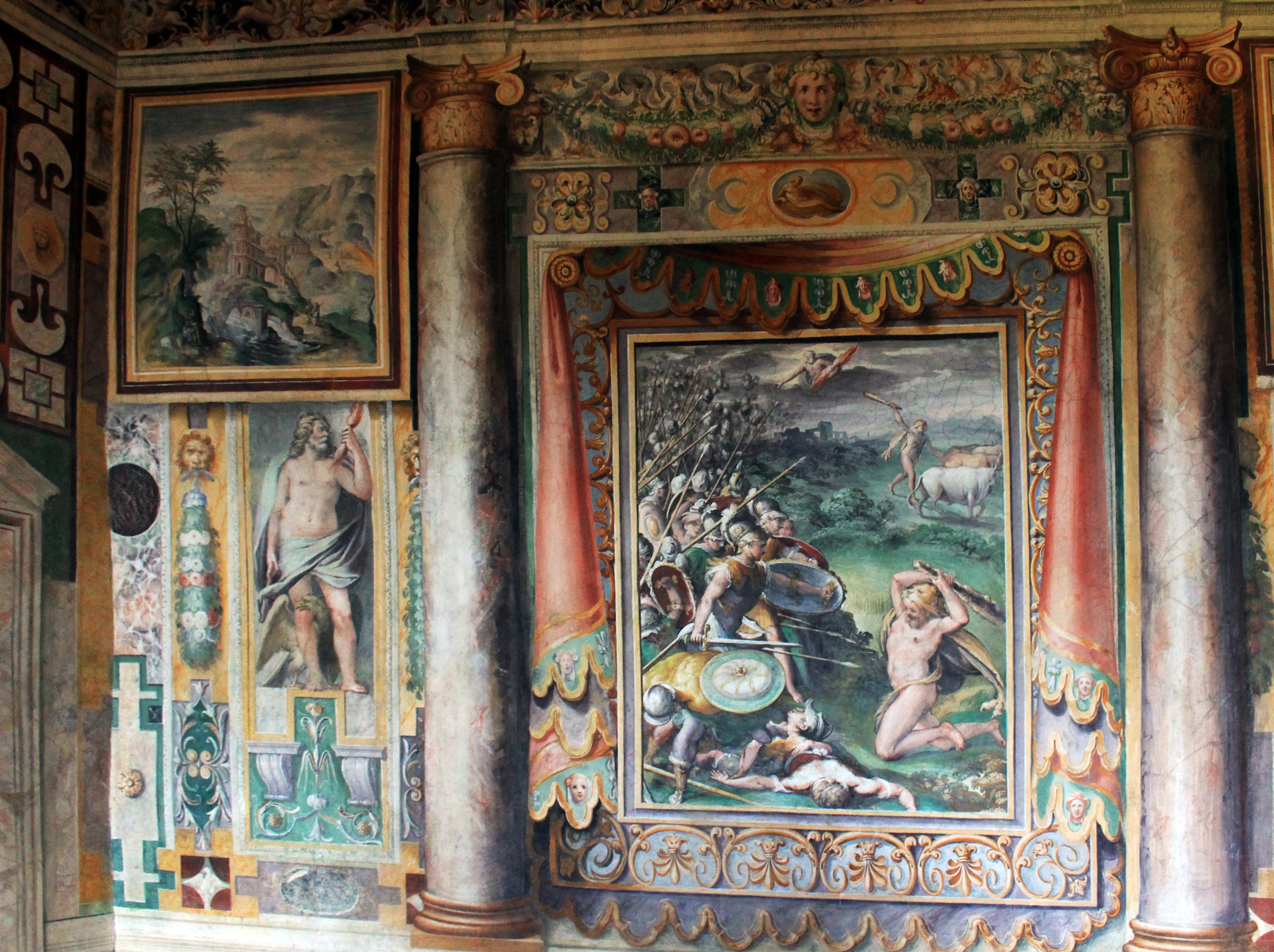
Decoration of the First Tiburtine Hall

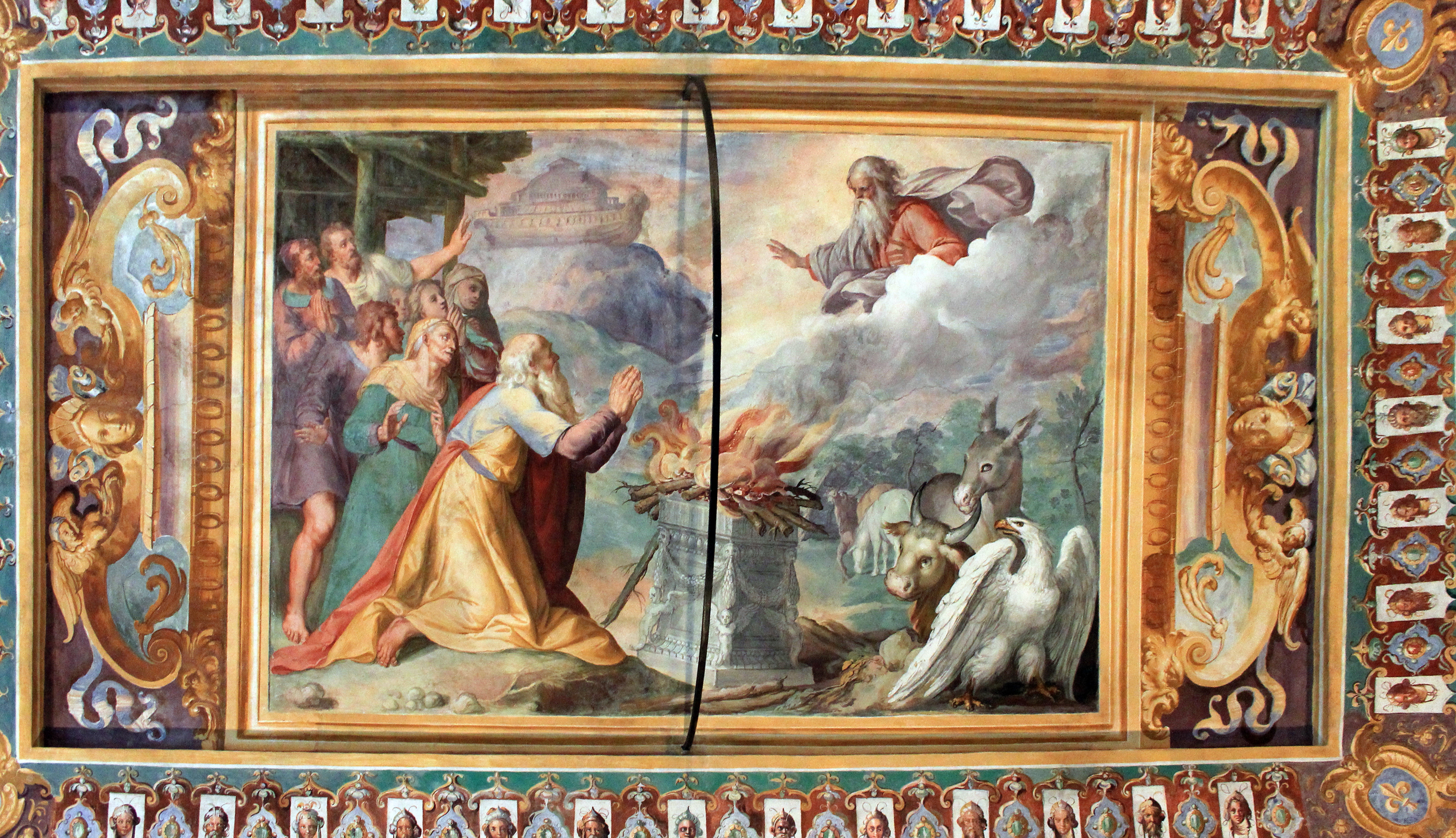
Fresco in the Hall of Noah

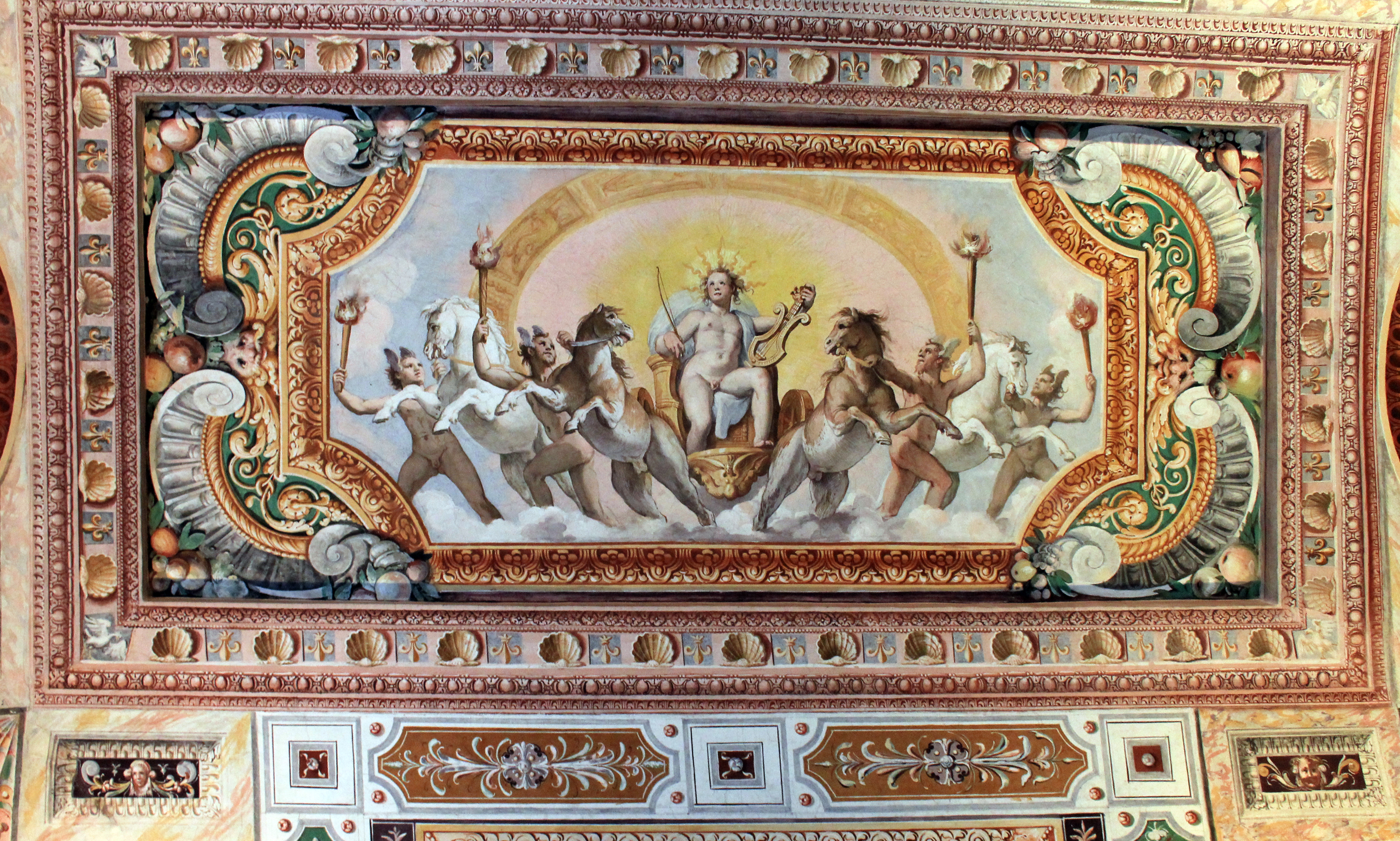
The Triumph of Apollo, in the Second Tiburtine Hall

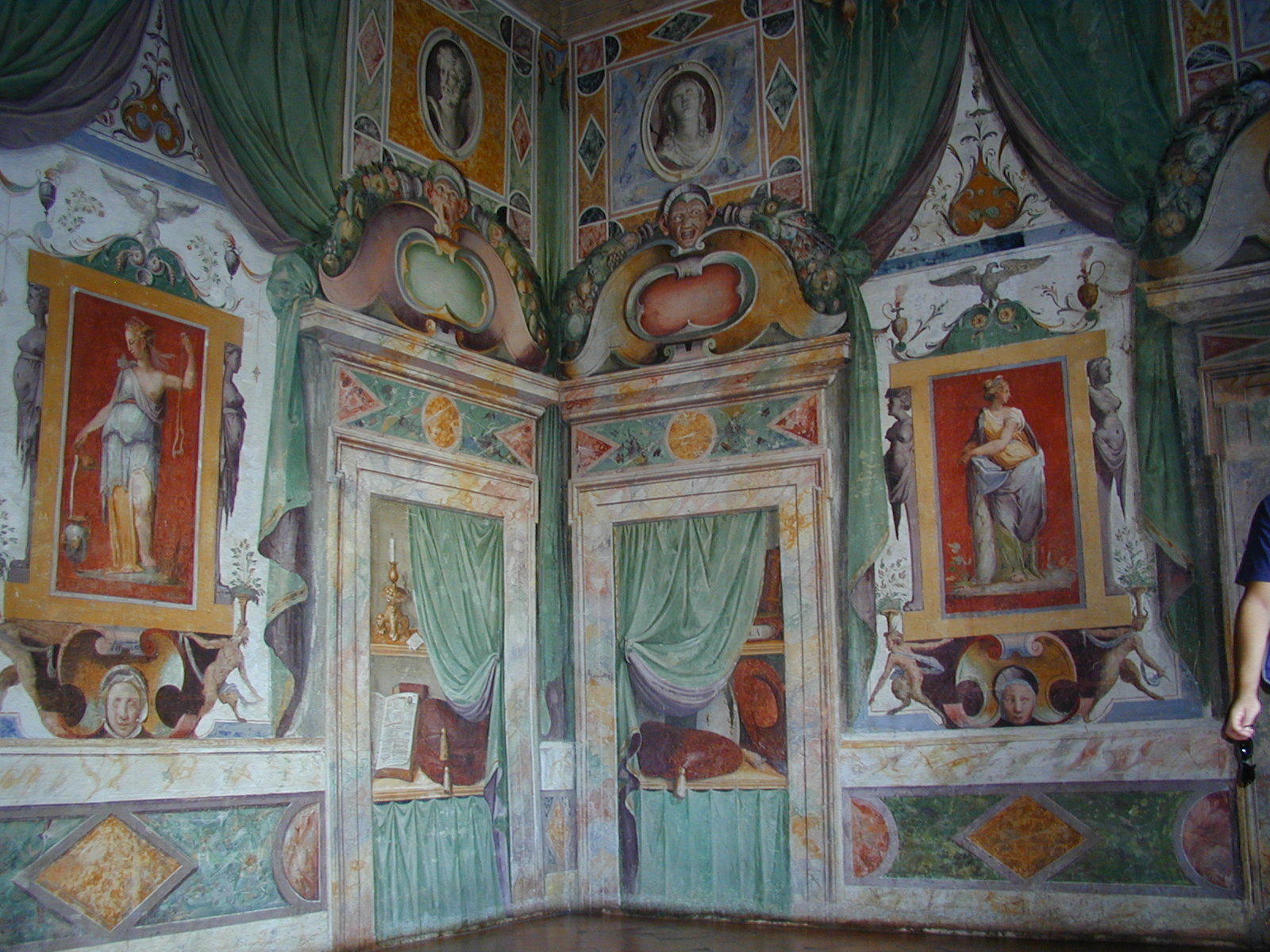
The Hall of Glory

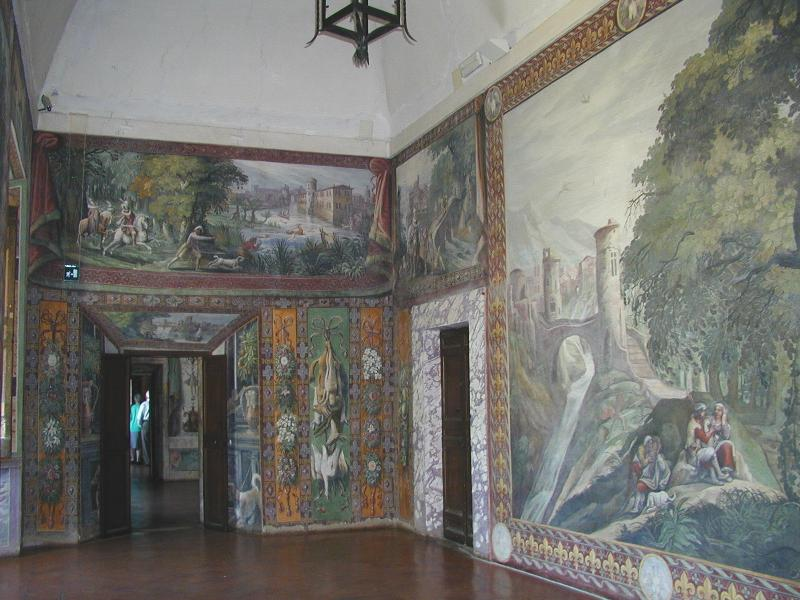
The Hall of the Hunt

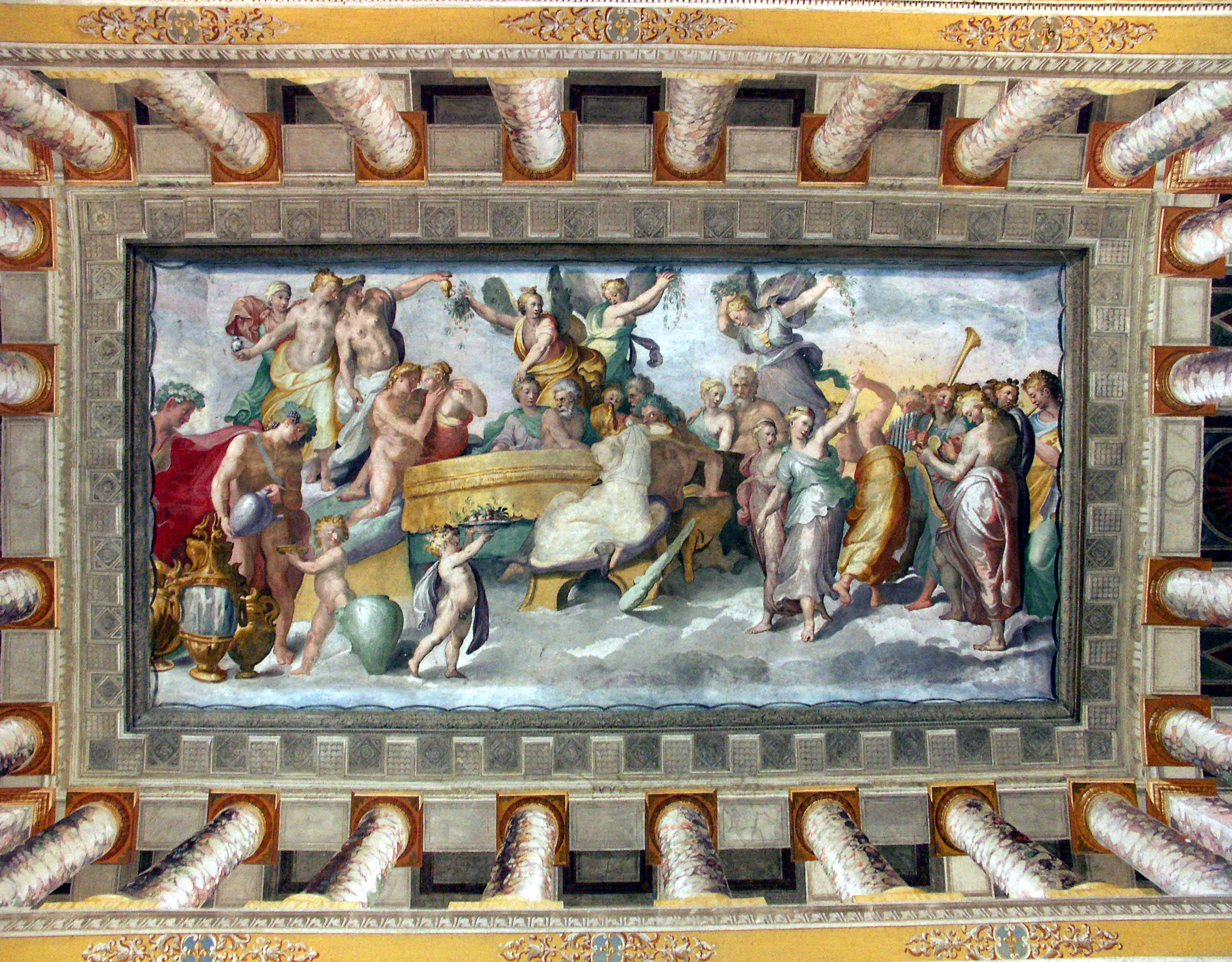
Fresco of The Synod of the Gods on the ceiling of the Hall of the Fountain

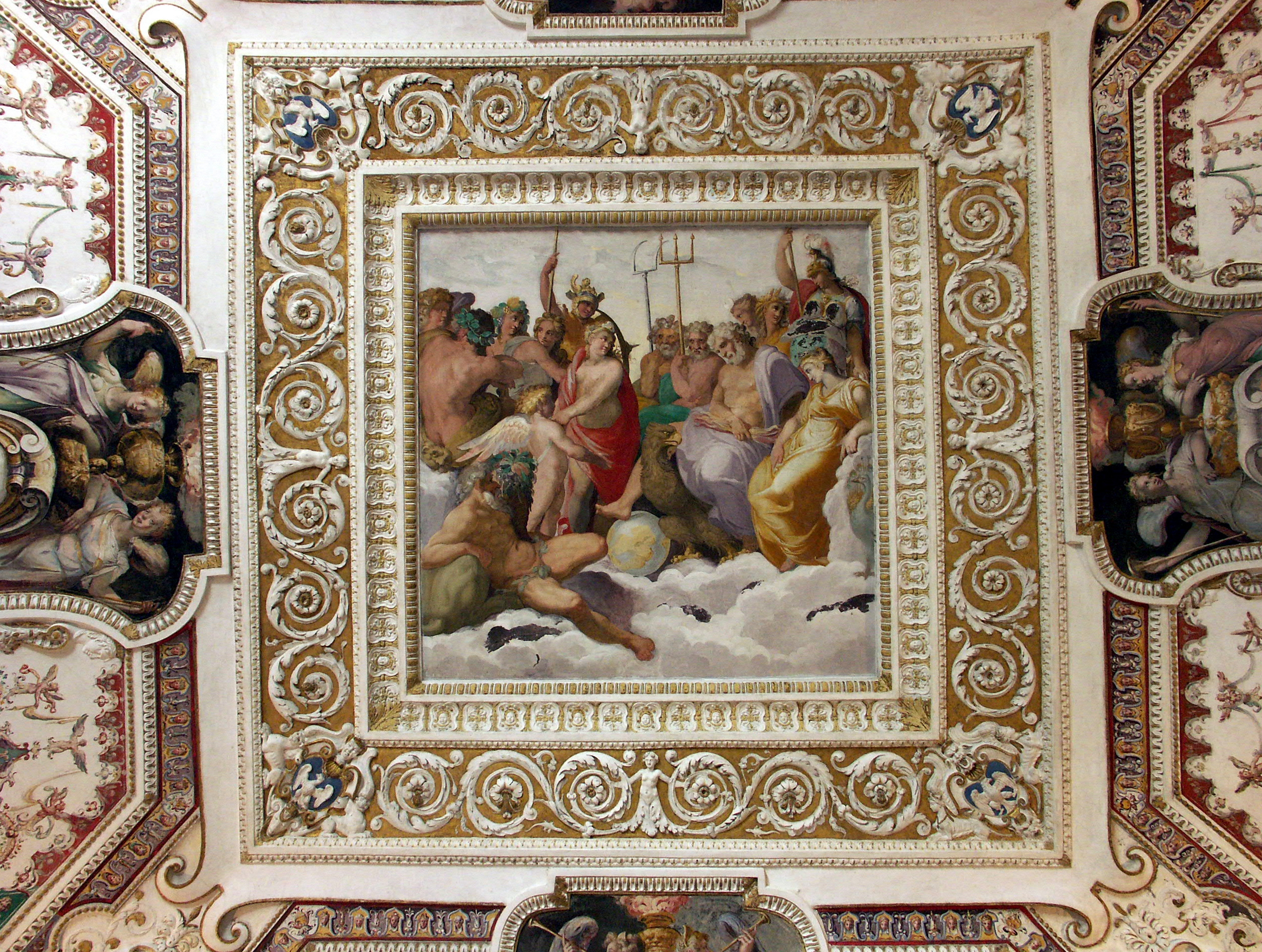
Fresco of Hercules welcomed to Olympus, on the ceiling of the Hall of Hercules

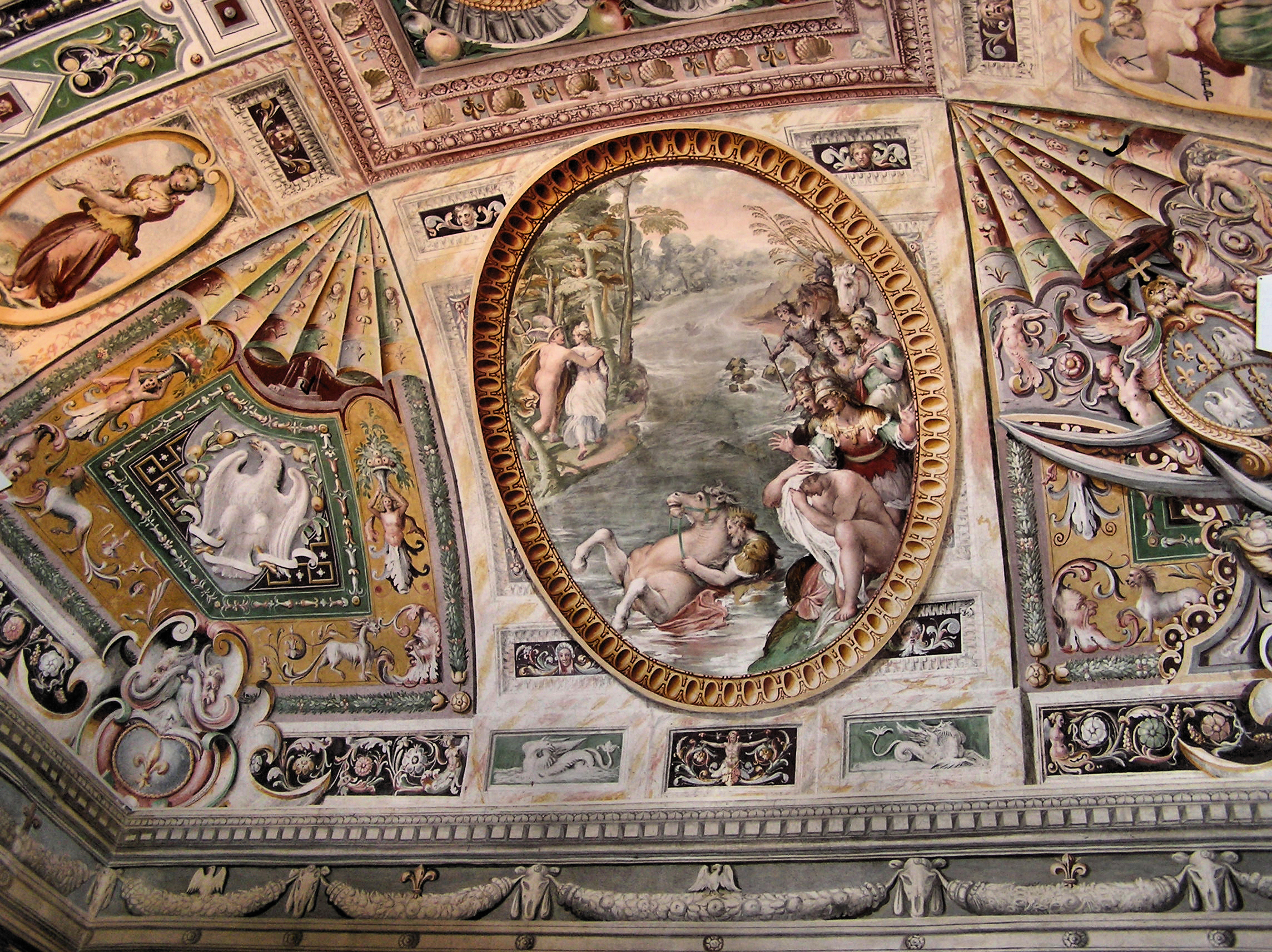
Ceiling fresco of the Second Tiburtine Hall, with scenes from mythology and Roman history

The floor below the Cardinal's personal apartments contains a series of highly decorated rooms, each decorated with a specific theme, all connected to nature, mythology, and water. The rooms are less formal than those of the apartment above; they were used for private moments in the life of the Cardinal; listening to music or poetry; conversation, reading, and religious reflection. They are reached by a large ceremonial stairway that descends from the courtyard, and are connected to each other by a long narrow corridor with a high vaulted ceiling, which receives light from a series of openings to the courtyard above. The ceiling of the corridor is decorated with mosaics from the late 16th century, representing a pergola inhabited by colorful birds, making the corridor seem a part of the garden. The corridor also features three elaborate rustic fountains, containing miniature grottos framed with columns and pediments.

The Hall of Noah, like the other rooms on the floor, has walls covered with frescoes designed to resemble tapestries, intertwined with scenes of classical landscapes, ruins, rustic farm houses, and other scenes covering inch of the ceiling and walls, This room is dated to 1571, at the end of the decoration of the villa, and is attributed to Girolamo Muziano, who was famous for similar scenes of Venetian landscapes. The major scenes portrayed are the Four Seasons, allegories of prudence and temperance, and the central scene of Noah with the ark shortly after its landing on Mount Ararat, making an agreement with God. A white eagle, the symbol of the d'Este, is prominently shown landing from the Ark.

The next room, the Hall of Moses, features a fresco in the center of the ceiling showing Moses striking a rock with his rod and bringing forth water for the people of Israel. This was an allusion to the Cardinal, who had brought water to the Villa gardens by making channels through the rock. Other panels show scenes from the life of Moses, a hydra with seven heads, the emblem of the family of Ercole I d'Este, an ancestor of Ippolito, and fantastic landscapes.

The Hall of Venus originally had as its centerpiece a large fountain, with an artificial cliff and grotto framed in stucco. The fountain featured a basin of water and a classical statue of a sleeping Venus, but in the 19th century the basin was removed and the Venus, which had been removed after the death of the Cardinal, was replaced by two new statues of Peace and Religion, representing a scene at the grotto of Lourdes. The original terra cotta floor is still in place, featuring the white eagle of the d'Este family. The only other decoration in the room is the 17th-century painting on the ceiling of angels offering flowers to Venus.

The First and Second Tiburtine Halls were created at the same time by a team of painters led by Cesare Nebia; they were made before 1569. and they both have a common plan. The walls are covered with painted architectural elements, including columns and doors and elaborate painted moldings and sculptural elements. Floral designs fill the spaces between the painted architecture, along with medals, masks, and other insignia. The decoration of the two rooms illustrates stories from mythology and the history of Tiburtine region, where the villa is located.

The main theme of the Second Tiburtine Hall is the story of the Tiburtine Sibyl: According to mythology, Queen Ida was punished by Jupiter for having raised young Bacchus to avoid the madness of her husband, Atamante; Venus and Neptune transformed her into a seer, Leucotea. She traveled to Italy where she lived in the Tiburtine forests, giving prophecies and predicting the birth of Christ. Another Tiburtine legend illustrated in the room is that of King Annius, who pursued Mercury, the kidnapper of his daughter Cloris, and was drowned in the river Aniene, which takes his name, and which provides the water for the fountains of the Villa. The Sibyl, King Annius, and the personification of the Aniene River all appear in the frescoes of the room, along with the Triumph of Apollo.

The First Tiburtine Hall illustrates the story of three legendary Greek brothers, Tiburtus, Coras, and Catillus, who defeated the Sicels, an Italic tribe, and built a new city, Tibur (now Tivoli). Their battle is illustrated in the central fresco of the ceiling, as are other events in the founding of the region. The decoration of the room also includes the Tenth Labor of Hercules, where he steals a valuable herd of cattle, and is rescued by Zeus, who showers his enemies with stones; as well as pairs of gods and goddesses in painted niches: Vulcan and Venus, Jupiter and Juno, Apollo with Diana, and Bacchus with Circe. One wall is an illustration of the oval fountain which Ippolito was building at the time the room was decorated.

The Hall of the Fountain was used by Cardinal Ippolito as a reception room for guests who had just arrived through the garden below, and for concerts and other artistic events. The room was built between 1565 and 1570, probably by Girolamo Muziano and his team of artists. The central element is a wall fountain, covered with multicolored ceramics and sculpture, encrusted with pieces of glass, seashells and precious stones, and crowned by the white eagle of the d'Este family. The fountain was finished in 1568 by Paolo Calandrino. The basin of the fountain rests on two stone dolphins. The reliefs in the central niche depict the fountain of the Tiburtine acropolis and Temple of the Sibyl. On the other walls are images of the house and unfinished garden and fountains, and a small illustration on the opposite wall from the fountain of Ippolito's villa in Rome, on the Quirinal Hill, now a residence of the Pope. The paintings on the ceiling are devoted to scenes of mythology; each corner has a portrait of a different god and goddess. Tradition says that the painting of Mercury is a self-portrait of Muziano. The central fresco on the ceiling depicts the Synod of the Gods, with Jupiter in the center surrounded by all the gods of Olympus. The fresco is modeled after a similar work by Raphael in the Loggia of Psyche in the Villa Farnesina. The hall connects with the loggia, and from there a stairway descends to the garden.

The Hall of Hercules dates to 1565–66 and is also by Muziano. The paintings on the ceiling depict eight of the labors of Hercules, surrounded by depictions of landscapes, ancient architecture, and the graces and the virtues. The central painting of the ceiling shows Hercules being welcomed into Olympus by the gods.

The Hall of Nobility was the work of a different artist, Federico Zuccari, and his team of painters. The central fresco on the ceiling depicts "Nobility on the throne between Liberality and Generosity". The decoration on the walls includes paintings of busts of Plato, Pythagoras, Diogenes, Socrates and other classical philosophers, the Graces and Virtues, and Diana of Ephesus, the goddess of Fertility, who also has a fountain dedicated to her in the garden.

The Hall of Glory was completed between 1566 and 1577 by Federico Zuccari and eight assistants. It is a masterpiece of Roman mannerist painting, with painted illusions of doors, windows, tapestries, sculptures, and of everyday objects used by the Cardinal. The central painting of the ceiling, the Allegory of Glory, has been lost, but there are allegorical depictions of the virtues, the Four Seasons, and of Religion, Magnanimity, Fortune and Time.

The Hall of the Hunt was created later than the other rooms, at the end of the 16th or beginning the 17th century, and is in a different style; it features hunting scenes, rural landscapes, hunting trophies, and, oddly, scenes of naval battles. A stairway of travertine stone, called the "snail stairway", descends to the garden. It was originally built to access a pallacorda court, an ancestor of tennis, which Ippolito imported into Italy from the French Court. The space where the court was located now houses the cafeteria and bookstore.

The complete construction and furnishing of Ippolito's apartments was completed in 1572 when Ippolito was on his deathbed.

== Gardens and fountains ==
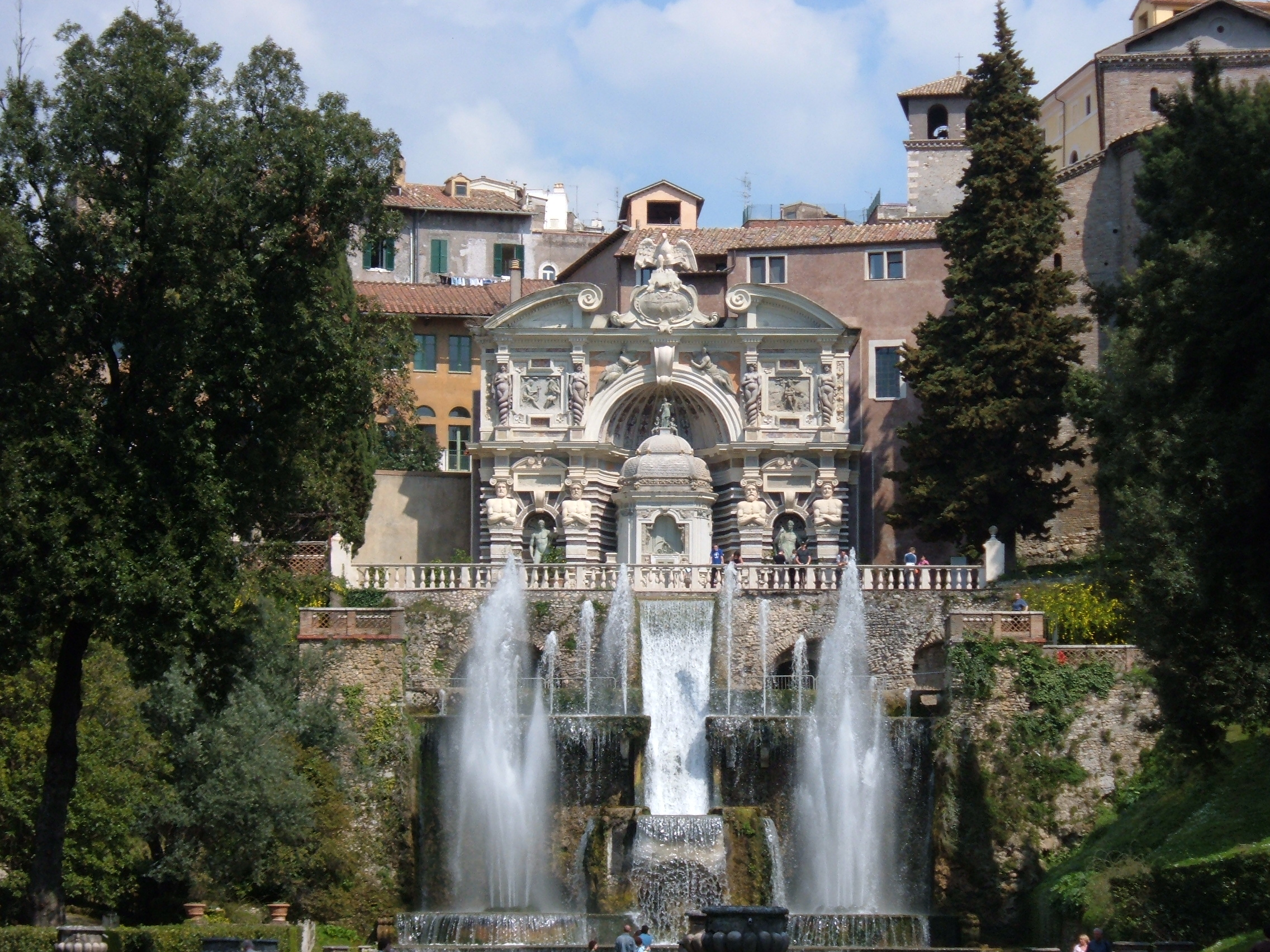
The Fountain of Neptune below the Fountain of the Organ

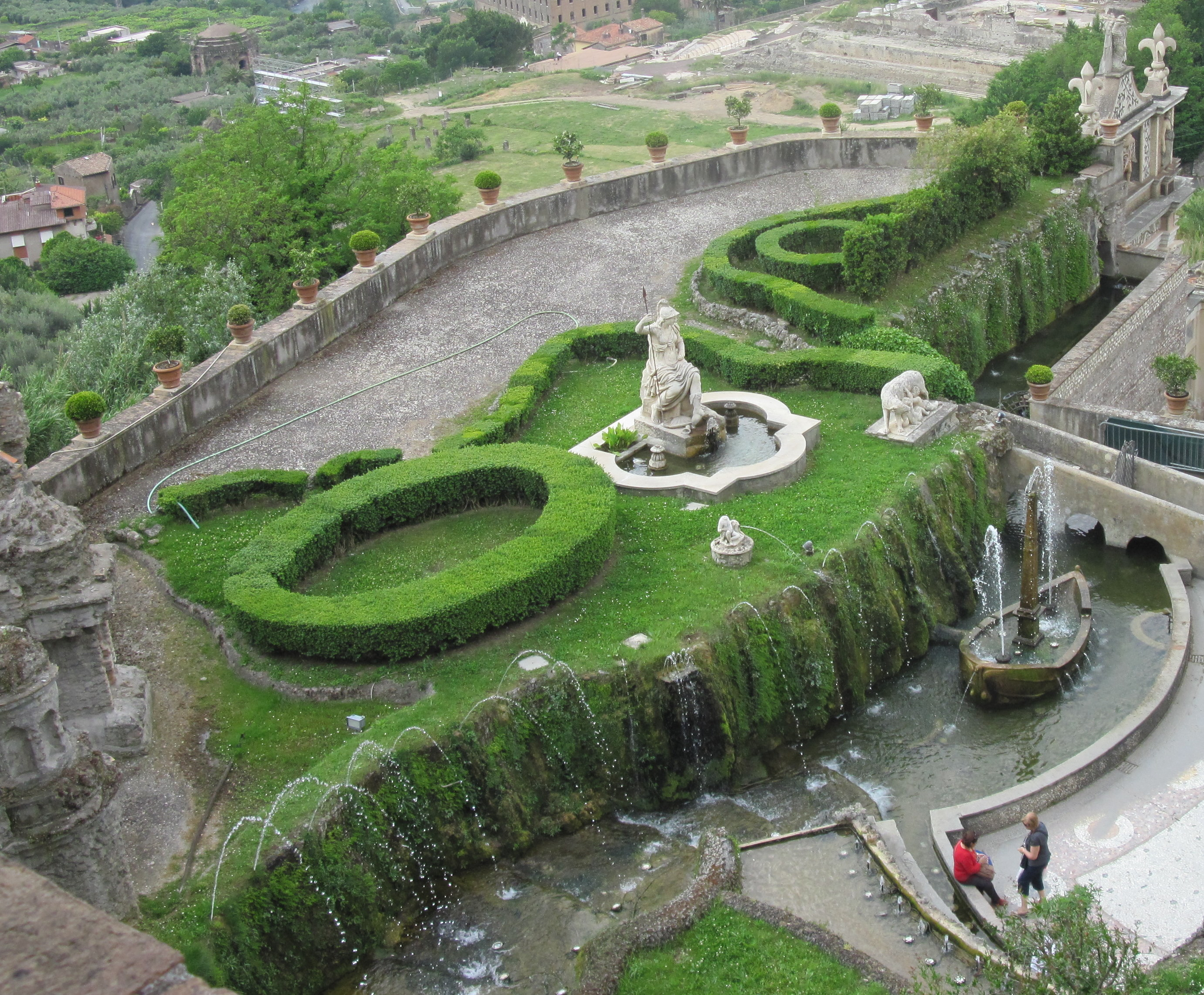
The Rometta fountain

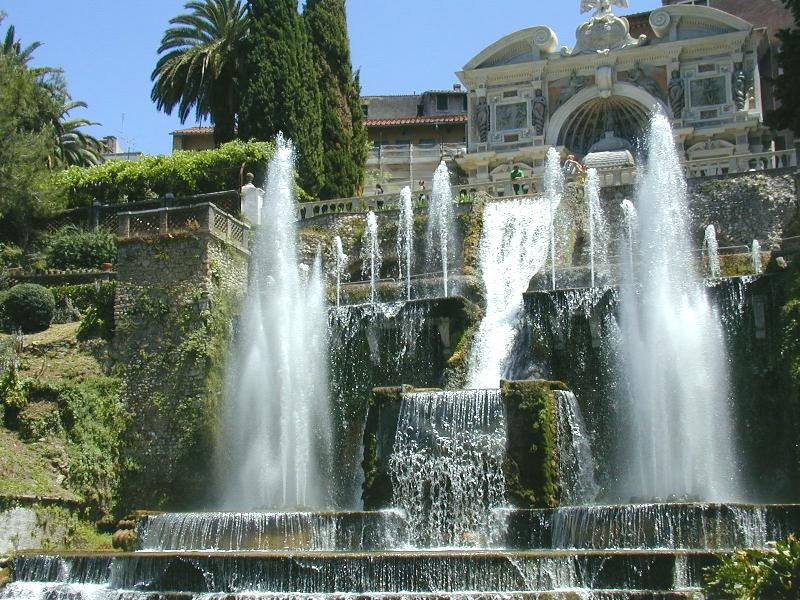
Neptune's fountain

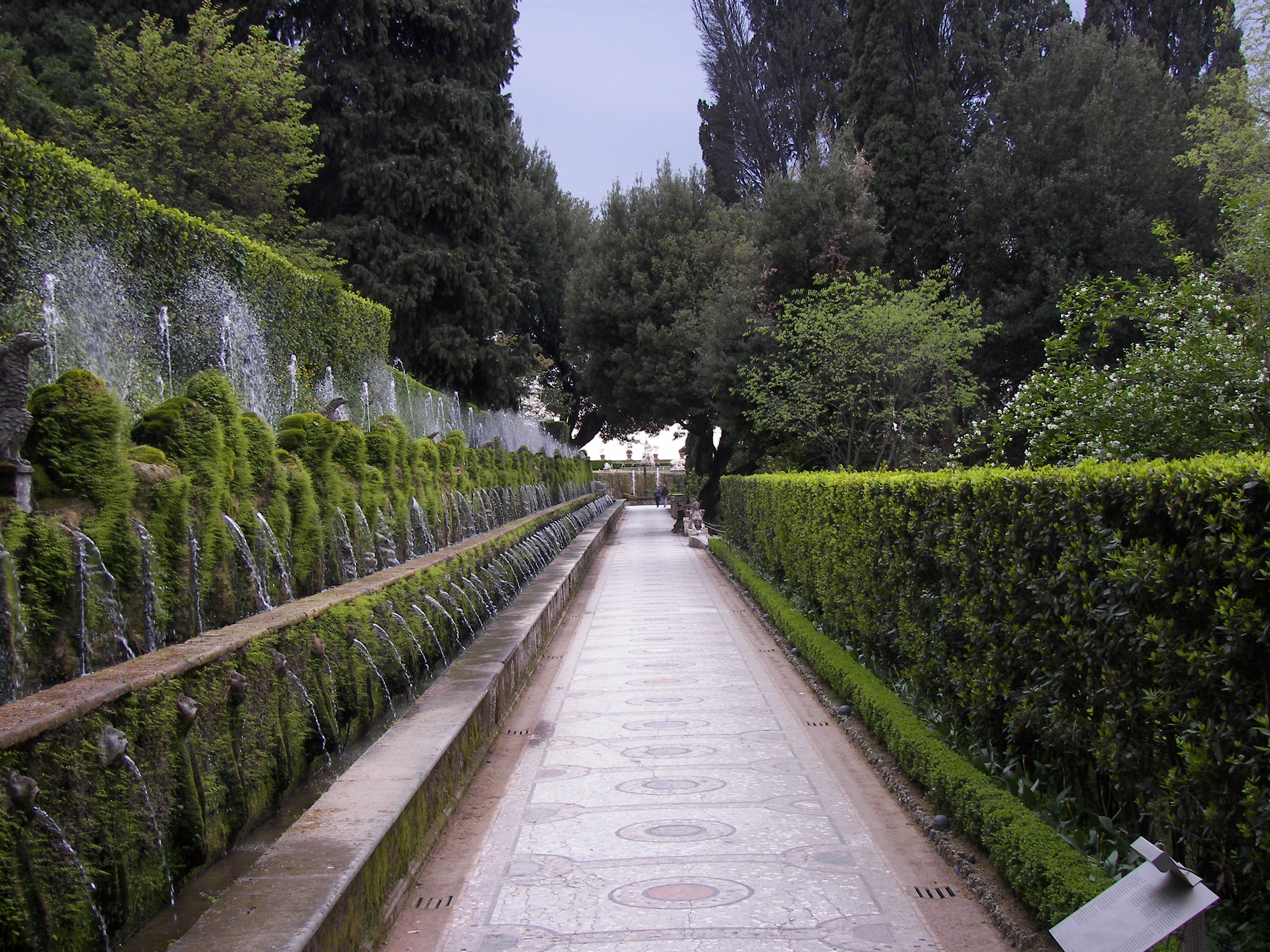
One hundred fountains

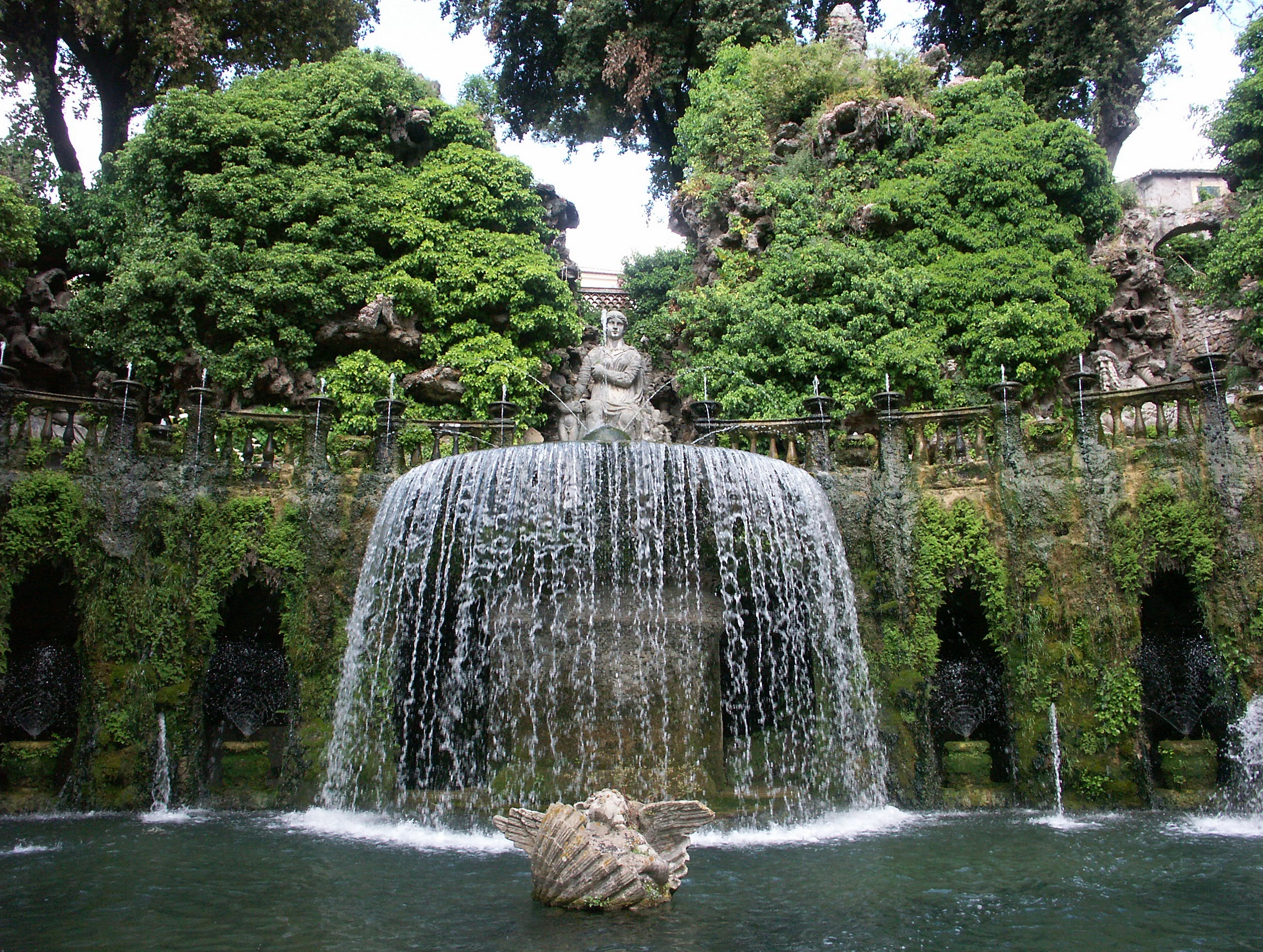
The Fontana dell'Ovato ("Oval Fountain") cascades from its egg-shaped basin into a pool set against a rustic nymphaeum.

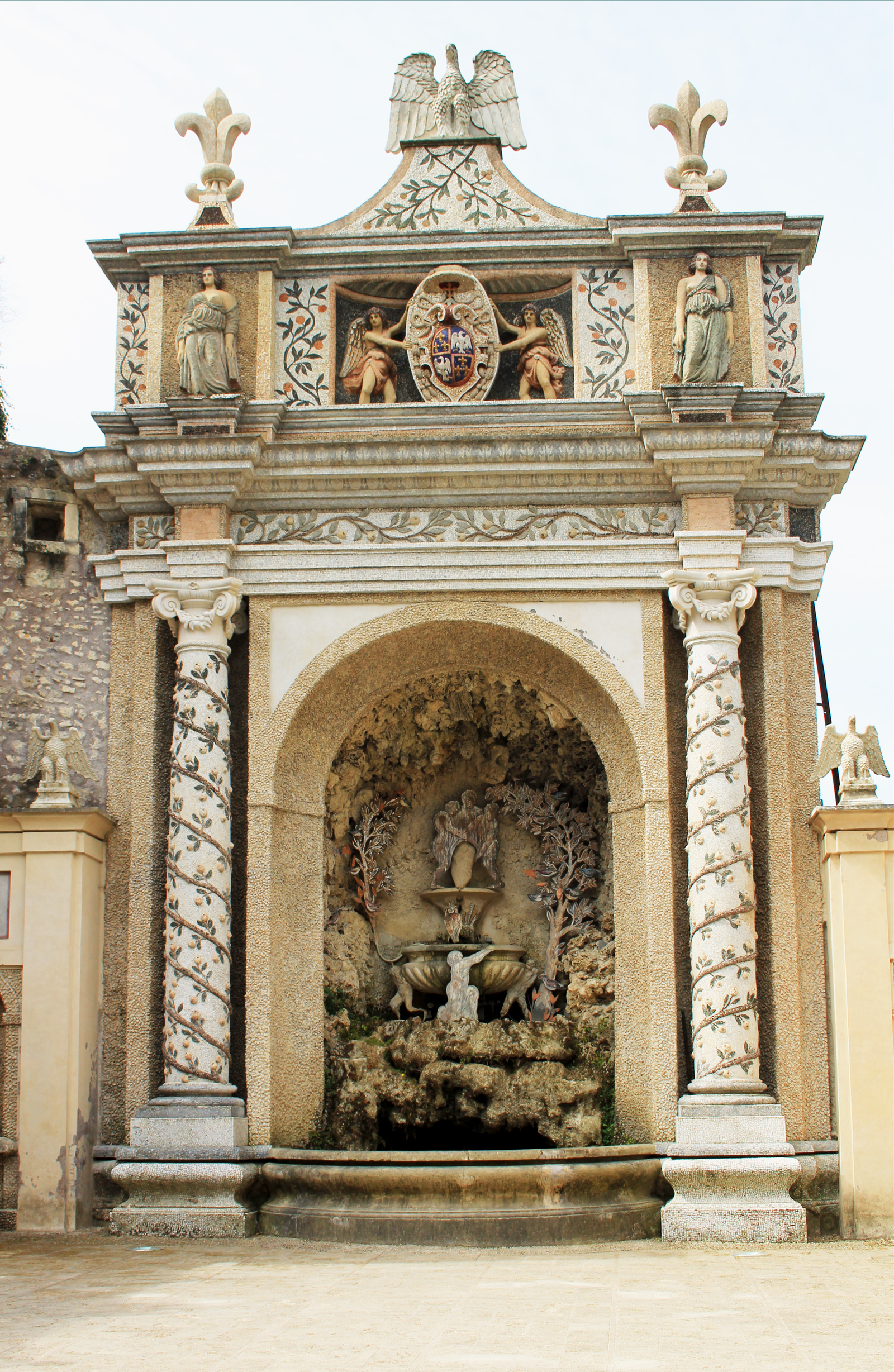
The Fountain of the Owl

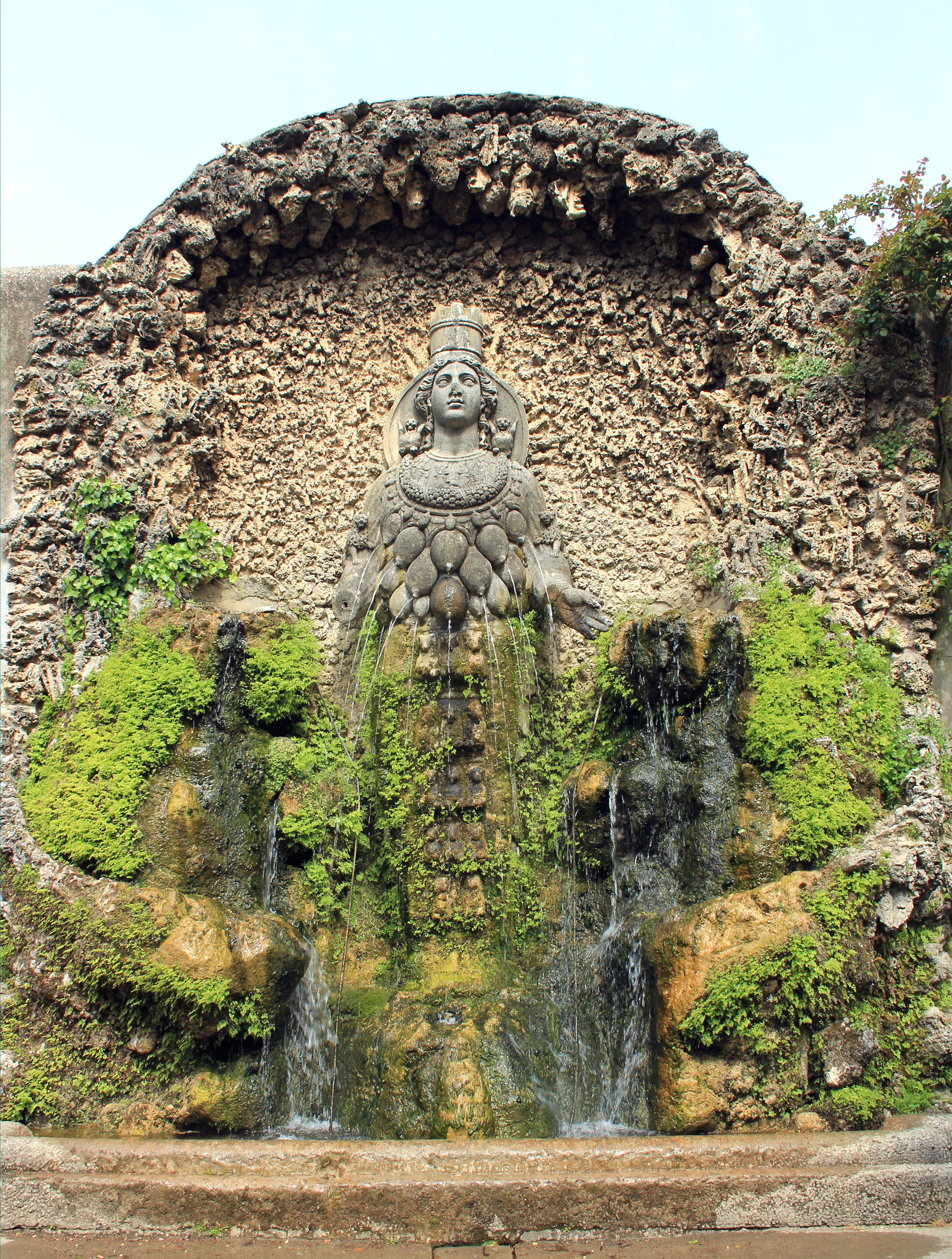
The Fountain of Diana of Ephesus, or "Mother Nature"

The Villa d'Este gained fame because of its system of fountains; fifty-one fountains and nymphaeums, 398 spouts, 364 water jets, 64 waterfalls, and 220 basins, fed by 875 metres of canals, channels and cascades, and all working entirely by the force of gravity, without pumps.

Pirro Ligorio, who was responsible for the iconographic programs worked out in the villa's frescos, was also commissioned to lay out the gardens for the villa, with the assistance of Tommaso Chiruchi of Bologna, one of the most skilled hydraulic engineers of the sixteenth century; Chiruchi had worked on the fountains at Villa Lante. At Villa d'Este he was assisted in the technical designs for the fountains by a Frenchman, Claude Venard, who was a manufacturer of hydraulic organs. The result was one of the finest gardens of the Renaissance, rivaled only by the Villa Lante, the Villa Farnese at Caprarola and the Villas Aldobrandini and Torlonia in Frascati. The garden and water features were admired and imitated over the next two centuries in gardens from Portugal to Saint Petersburg.

The garden plan is laid out on a central axis with subsidiary cross-axes, refreshed by some five hundred jets in fountains, pools and water troughs. The water is supplied by the Aniene, which is partly diverted through the town, a distance of a kilometer, and, originally, by the Rivellese spring, which supplied a cistern under the villa's courtyard (now supplied by the Aniene too). The garden is now part of the Grandi Giardini Italiani.

=== The Vialone ===
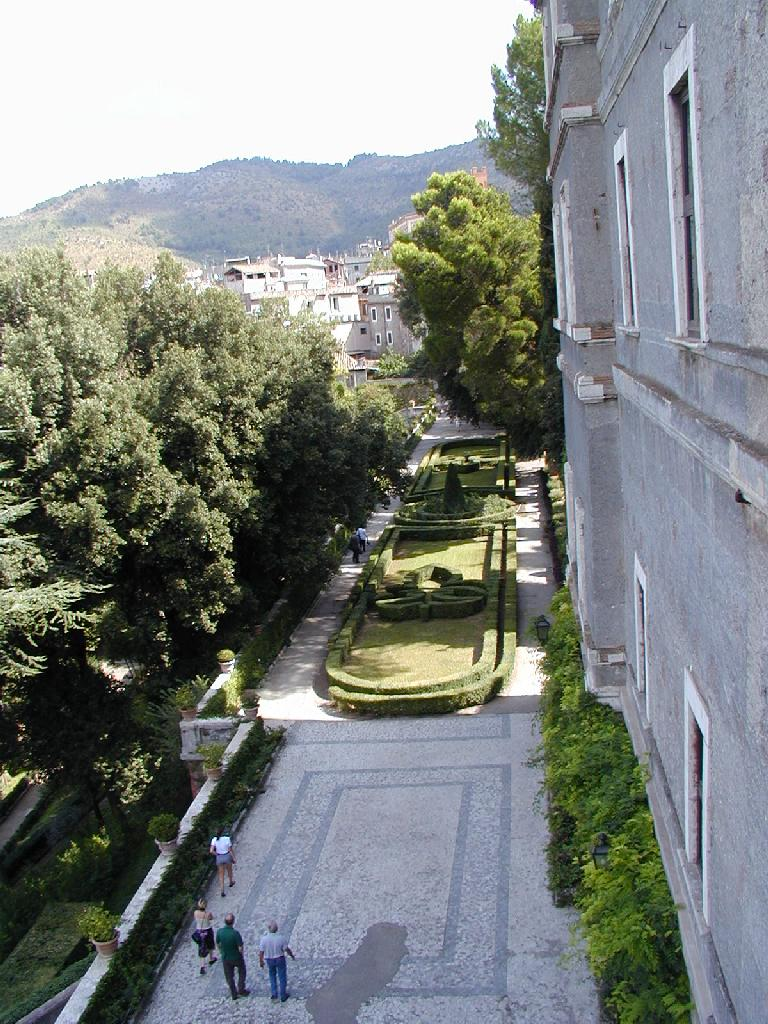
The Vialone, or terrace, at the top of the garden

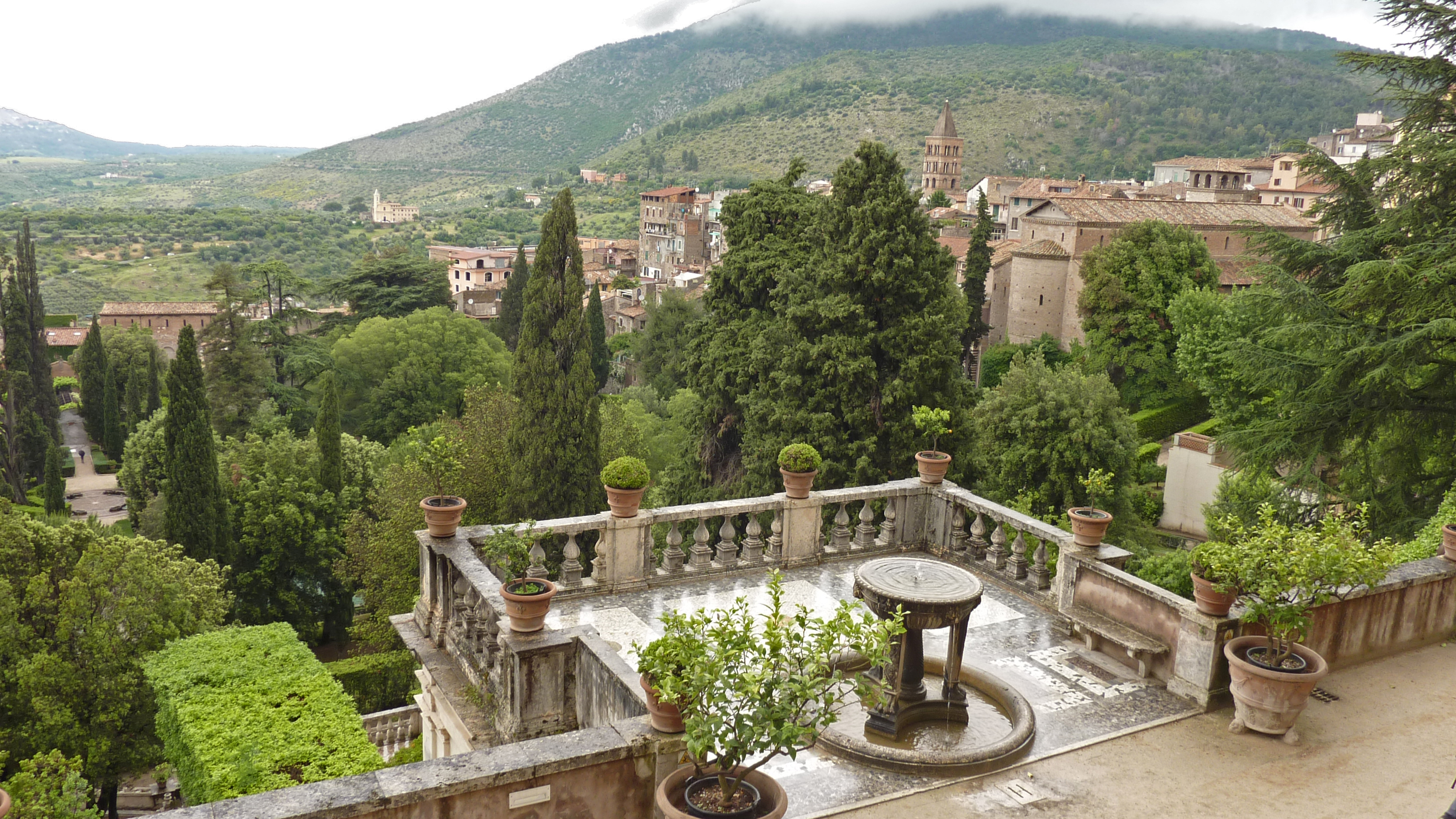
The Fountain of the Tripod, with the view of the garden below

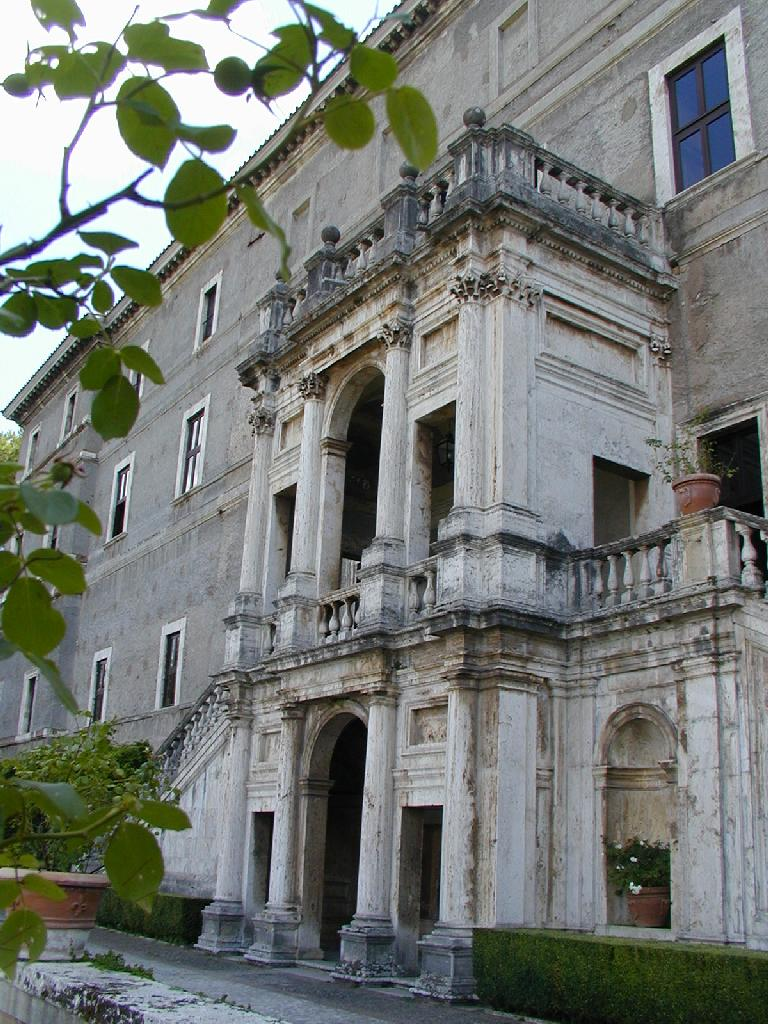
The double loggia provided access to the ceremonial rooms, and a terrace for Cardinal's apartments above

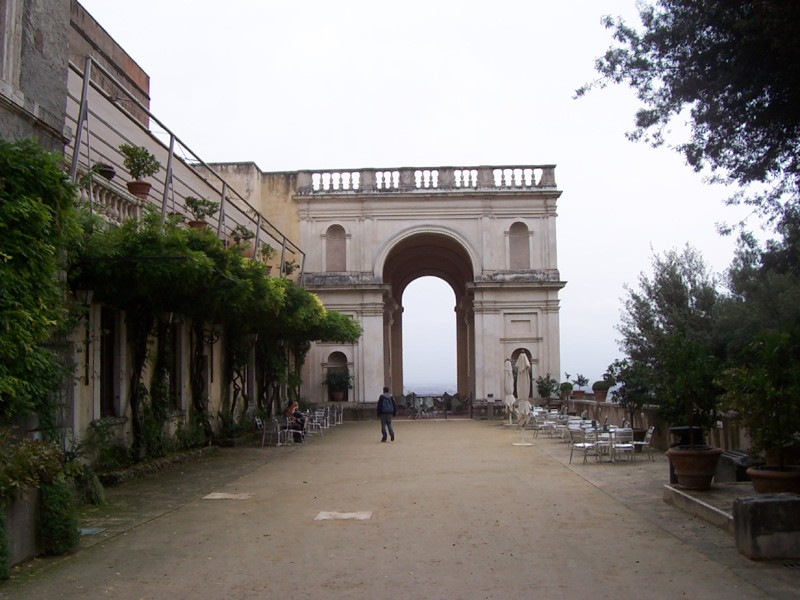
The Cenacolo, or Gran Loggia, at the end of the Vialone

A large terrace, 200 metres long, called the Vialone, lies between the Villa and the gardens, with a panoramic view of the gardens and countryside beyond. It was constructed between 1568 and 1569. The Cardinals used the space for fireworks, games, spectacles and festivities. It originally was shaded by two rows of elm trees, except for the space directly in front of the Villa, left empty to preserve the view. The terrace is enclosed at one end by the Fountain of Europa, and at the other by an immense loggia and belvedere in the form of a triumphal arch called the Cenacolo. This structure provided shade beneath in summer, as well as commanding viewpoints of the scenery. It was originally intended to be decorated in the interior with stucco decoration, gilding and frescoes, but it was never finished.

In the center of the terrace, attached to the facade of the villa, is the double loggia, made in 1566–1577 of travertine stone. Its two stairways provide access to the ceremonial salons on the lower floor, while its upper level created a terrace for the Cardinal's apartments. On the terrace level it contains a Nymphaeum, or grotto, where the Fountain of Leda is located. The original statuary of the fountain, depicting Jupiter and Leda transformed into a swan and four children, Elena, Clytemnestra, Castor and Pollux. was sold in the 18th century and is now in the Galleria Borghese in Rome. The statuary has been replaced by headless statue of Minerva found in the garden of the Palazzo Manni in Tivoli. The original fountain featured a novel hydraulic trick; water spouting from a vase held by Leda struck a metal disk, which caused flashes of light to reflect on the walls of the grotto.

The Fountain of the Tripod is placed in the center of the Vialone. It has only been there since 1930; it is a copy of an ancient Roman fountain, a marble basin supported by a central column and three pilasters. The original is now in the Louvre. The original fountain on the site, the Fountain of the Sea Horses, which was moved by Ippolito from Hadrian's Villa to his garden, is now in the Vatican Museum.

The Fountain of Europa is found at the northeast end at the top of the garden. It was begun by Ippolito but was not finished until 1671. Its design, a triumphal arch with two orders of columns, corinthian and doric, copying that of the Grand Loggia. The large niche in the center, now empty, held a sculpture Europa Embracing the Bull which is now in the Villa Albani in Rome.

=== The upper garden ===
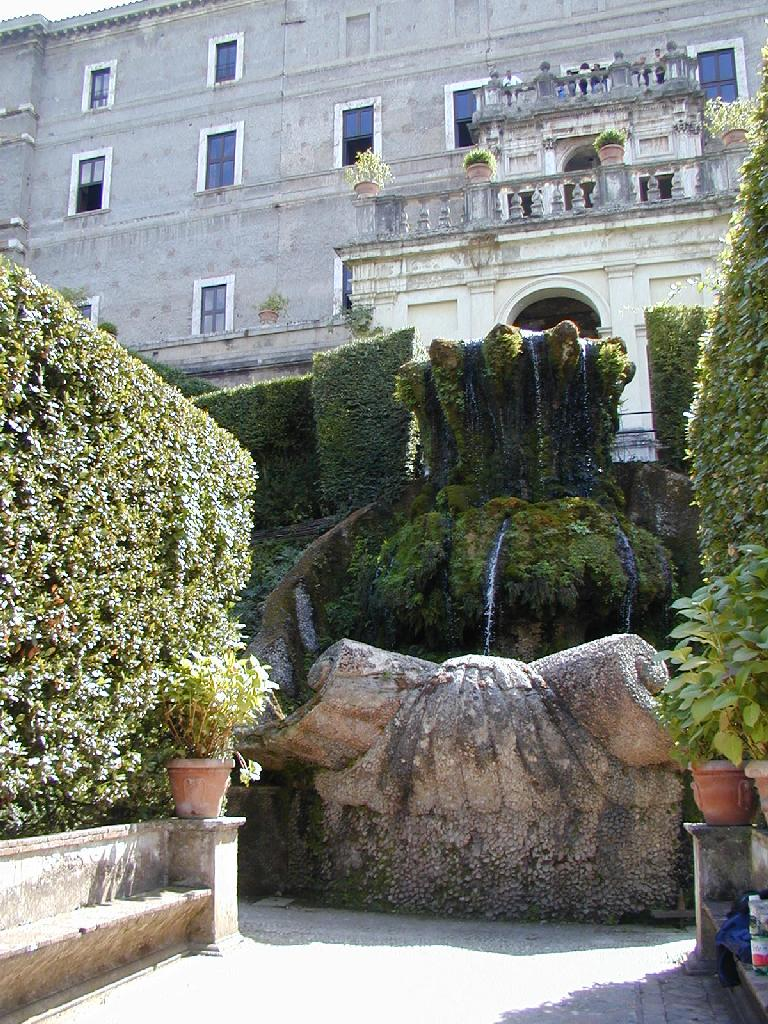
The Fountain of the Bicchierone, by Bernini, and the Loggetta of the Cardinal

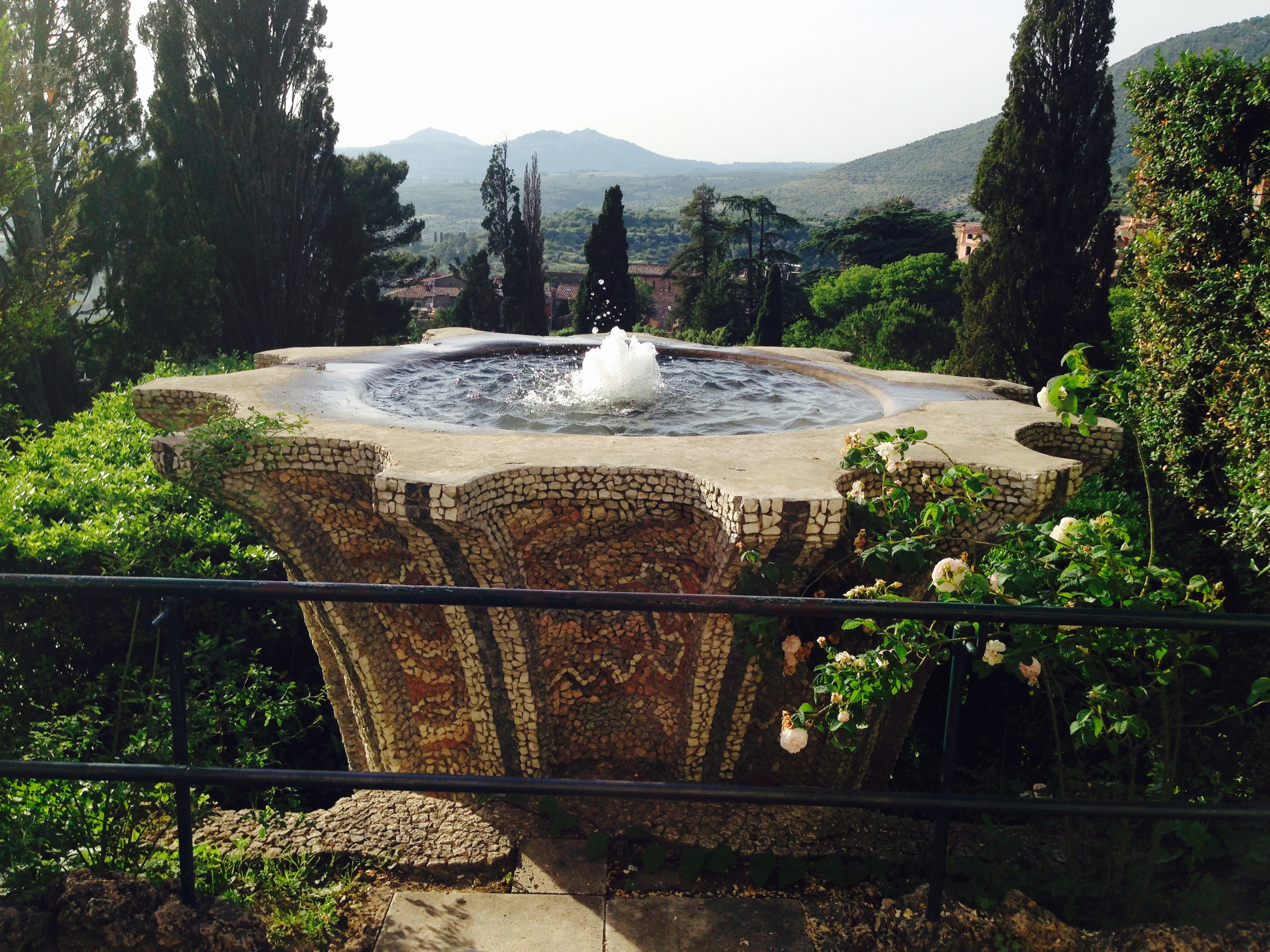
The Fountain of the Bicchierone, seen from the Terrace

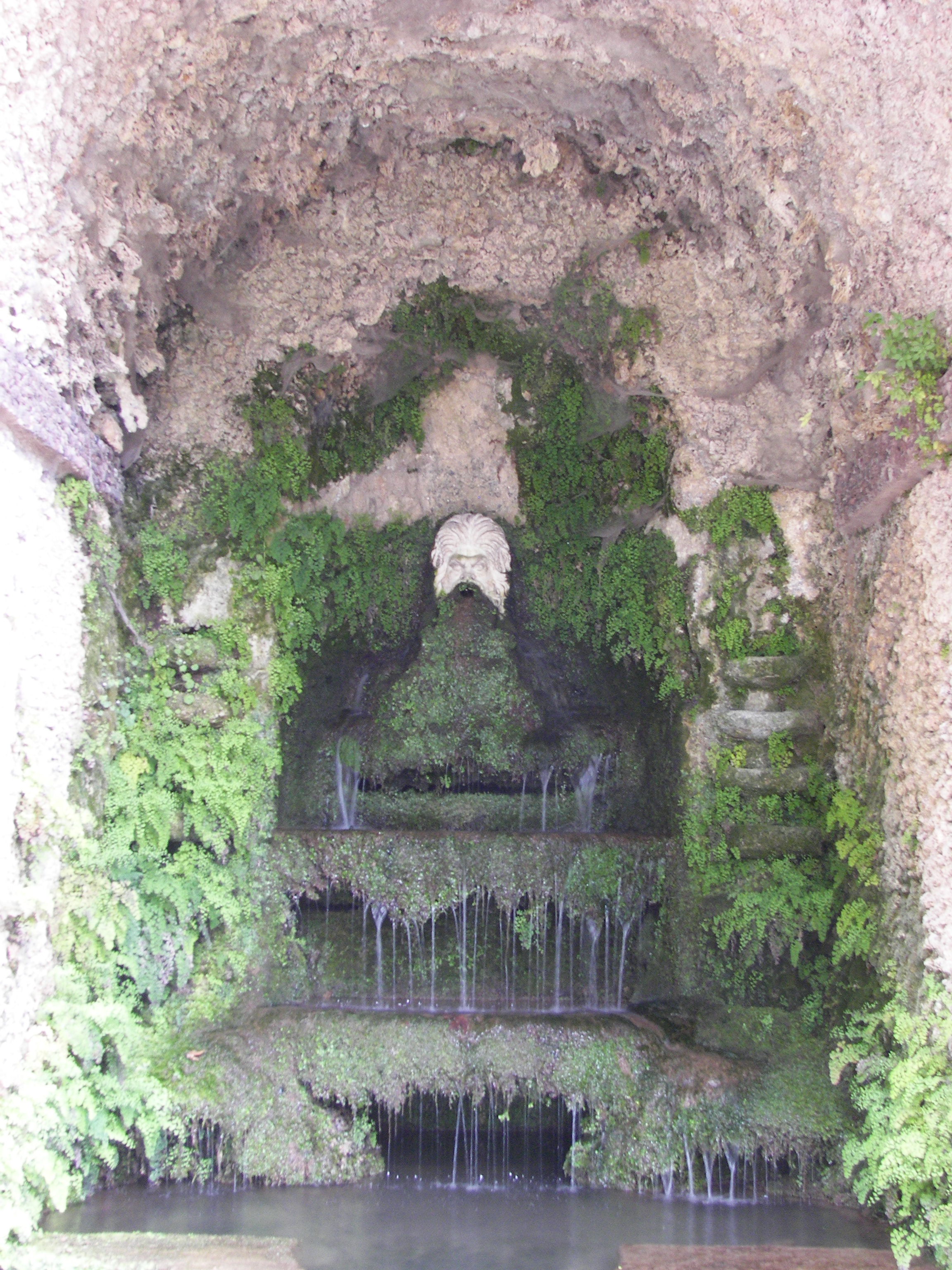
Mask spouting water in the Grotto of Pomona

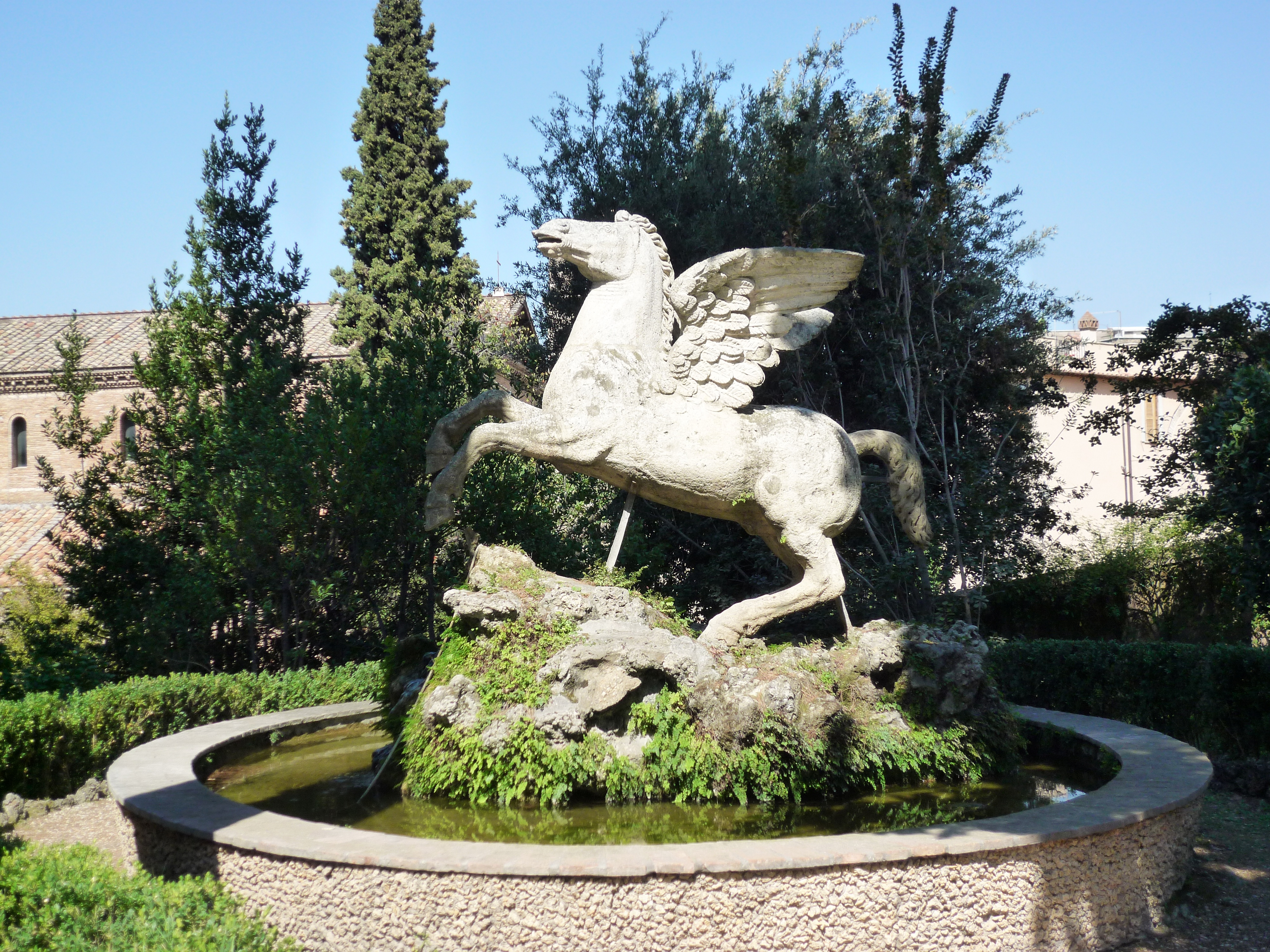
The Fountain of Pegasus

Two ramps lead down to the upper garden from Fountain of the Tripod, and there are symmetrical double flights of stairs at either end. The Cardinal's Walk is a shaded path, attached to the retaining wall of the terrace, which leads from one side of the garden to the other, passing by several grottos which are built into the retaining wall. At the southeast end of the walk, just below the Fountain of Europa, is the Grotto of Aegle and Aesculpius. The grotto is decorated with tartar flakes, mosaics and colored fragments of sea shells, and a small portion of the original fresco. It originally held two statues; that of Aesculpius, the god of medicine, now found in the Louvre, and of Aegle, the daughter of Auesculpius, the goddess of healing (now in the Vatican Museum).

The Loggia of Pandora is found in the middle of the Cardinal's Walk, just below the center of the Villa. This portion of the walk is covered, with arcades looking out at the garden. It contained a nymphaeum built into the wall, and originally was decorated with mosaics and with a statue of Pandora and two statues of Minerva. The statue of Pandora carried a vase of water, symbolizing the evils of the world. The vase was a concealed fountain, pouring out water. The statues were sold in the 18th century; Pandora and one of the Minervas are now in the Capitoline Museum. In the 19th century the nymphaeum was converted into a Christian chapel; it was a favorite place of the composer Franz Liszt, who dedicated two pieces of music to the chapel.

The Fountain of the Bicchierone is one of two fountains created for the Villa by Gian Lorenzo Bernini. It was made between 1660 and 1661 on a commission from Cardinal Rinaldo I d'Este. The basin of the fountain is in the form of a large shell, which reaches up to the level of the terrace. In the center is a toothed Bicchierone (cup or chalice) from which the water sprays upwards. Bernini supervised the building of the fountain, and, following its inauguration in May 1661, he had the height of the spouting water reduced, to avoid blocking the view from the Loggia of Pandora. Though not part of the original design of the garden, the fountain became a link between the architecture of the palace and the garden.

The Loggetta of the Cardinal is a small balustraded terrace surrounded by high laurel hedges and stone benches, between the Fountain of the Biccherone and the garden. This was said to be the Cardinal's favorite spot for reading and discussing poetry and art, and watching the construction of the garden around him. Shortly after his death, a large statue of Hercules, with the boy Achilles in his arms, was placed there, overlooking the garden below. It was one of three statues of Hercules in central positions along the central axis. When seen from the bottom the garden, they were all visible, aligned with the Loggia of the Villa at the top. The statue is now found in the Louvre.

The Grotto of Diana is located at the end of the Cardinal's Walk, below the Gran Loggia. It is a large underground vaulted chamber, decorated in 1570–72 by Paolo Caladrino, and completely covered with mosaics of mythological scenes, with images of fish, dragons, dolphins, pelicans and other animals, as well as the eagles and apples of the d'Este family. Its central feature was a rustic fountain with statue of the goddess Diana, in a large niche decorated with stuccol reliefs of landscapes, the sea and a ship. All of the statues were sold in the 18th century and are now in the Capitoline Museum in Rome. Some of the original majolica floor tiles from the 16th century can still be seen.

Below the Loggetta of the Cardinal is a walkway which traverses the garde passes by three grottos. In the center is the Grotto of Hercules, which is covered by the Loggetta of the Cardinal. Beneath this grotto was a cistern and some of the hydraulic machinery for the fountains below. The grotto once had stucco reliefs of either animals or the labors of Hercules. The statue of Hercules in repose formerly in the grotto is now in the Vatican Museum. The Grotto of Pomona is similar in design to the Grotto of Hercules. Some of the original mosaic decoration is still visible. The water poured into a fountain from a white marble mask, which was found when the fountain was restored in 2002.

=== The Oval Fountain (Fontana dell'Ovato) ===
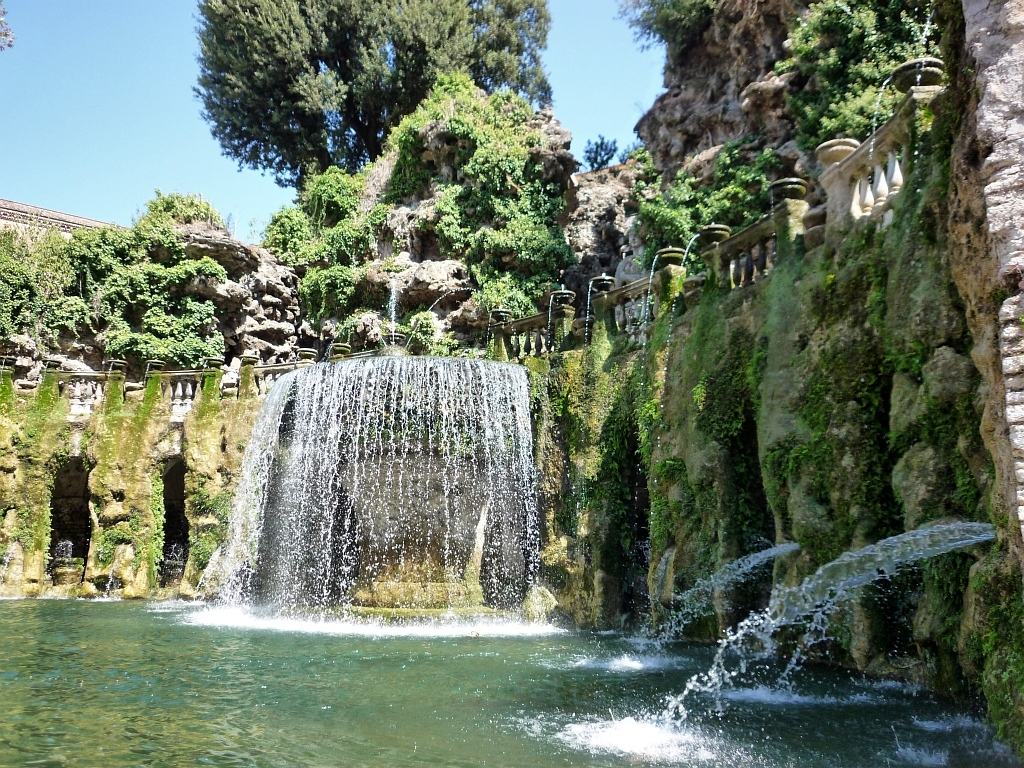
The Oval Fountain

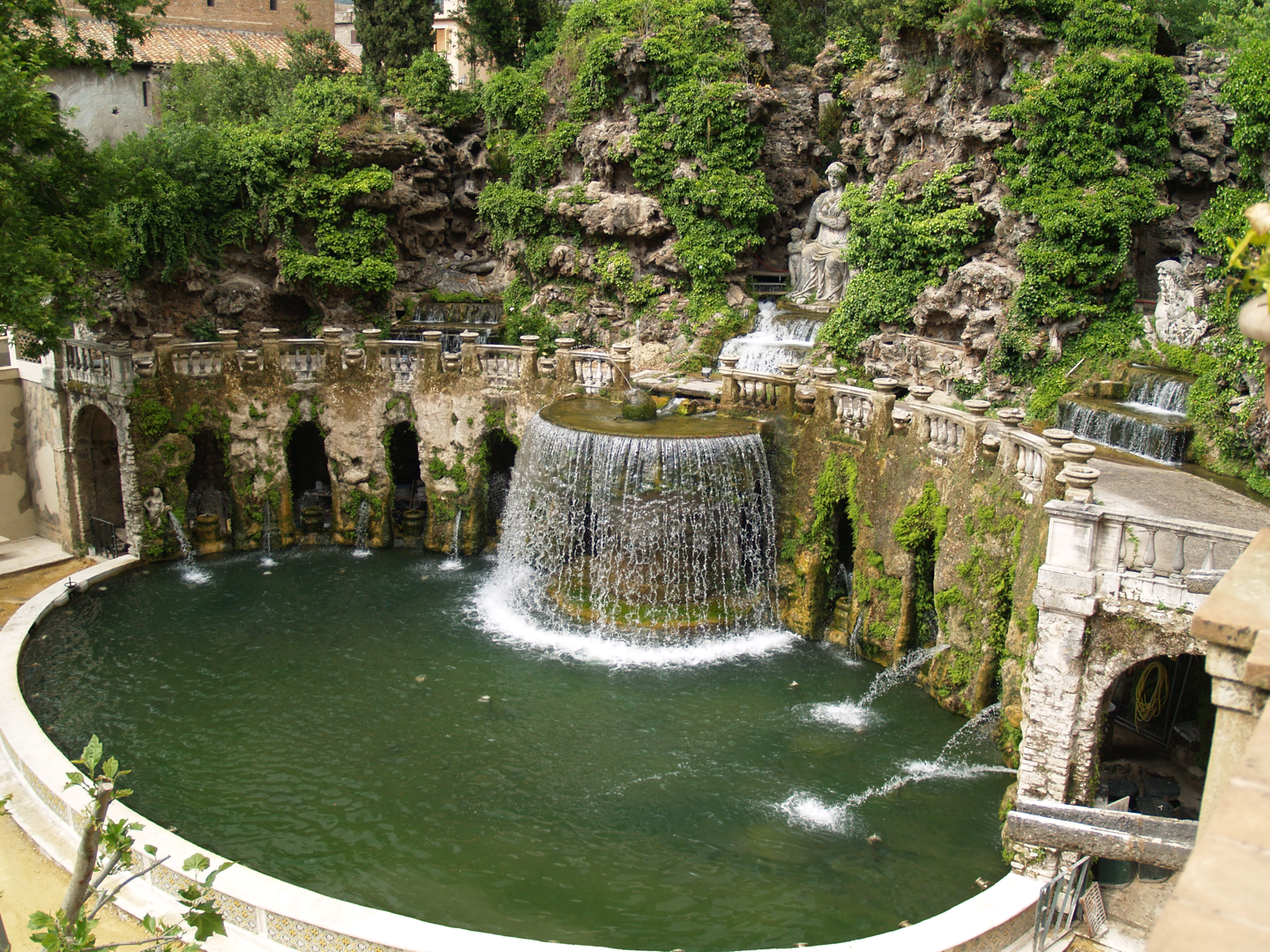
The oval fountain, seen from the terrace

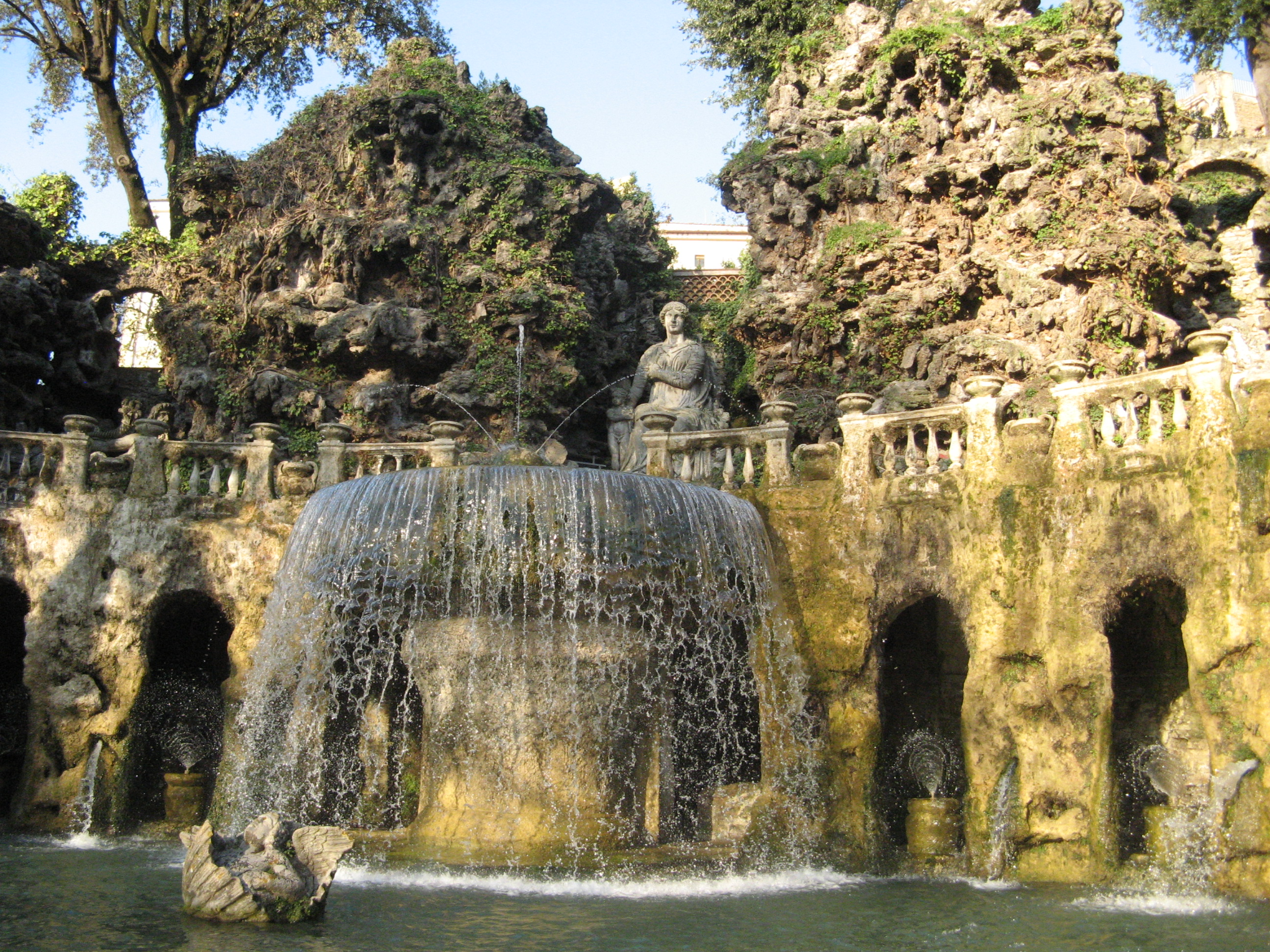
The statue of the Sibyl Albunensa over the fountain, and the artificial mountains behind it.

The Oval Fountain was one of the first fountains in the garden, and among the most famous. It was designed by Pirro Ligorio, the architect of the villa, as a water theater, spraying water in variety of forms. It was begun in 1565 and finished in 1570. It was made by fountain engineers Tomasso de Como and Curzio Maccarono, with sculpture by Raffaello Sangallo. A massive stone basin against the semicircular back wall cascades water into the fountain, and sprays it into the air, while water jets into the basin from vases in the hands of statues of Nereids, and also sprays in fan shapes from vases in niches in the semi-circular wall behind the fountain. An artificial mountain rises above the fountain, symbolizing the Tiburtine landscape; the mountain is pierced by three grottos, each pouring forth water, and is decorated with statues representing Albunea, with her son Melicerte, by Gillis van den Vliete (1568), and statues representing rivers Ercolaneo and Aniene, by Giovanni Malanca (1566), all of which pour water into the Oval Fountain. An upper walkway above the fountain leads past the ring of basins and cascades. The fountain also has its own grotto, the Grotto of Venus, designed by Pirro Ligorio, and built in 1565–68. It served as a meeting place for guests on hot summer days. The original statues of the grotto; a figure of Venus similar to the Capitoline Venus and two putti are no longer there, but traces of the monochrome murals of grotesque figures, tiles and sculpted grotto walls still remain.

=== The Hundred Fountains (Cento Fontane) ===
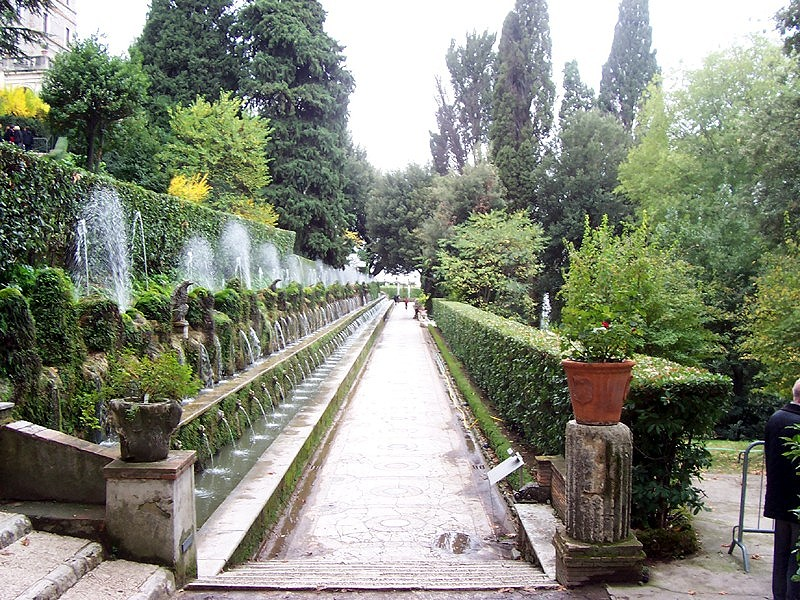
The Hundred Fountains

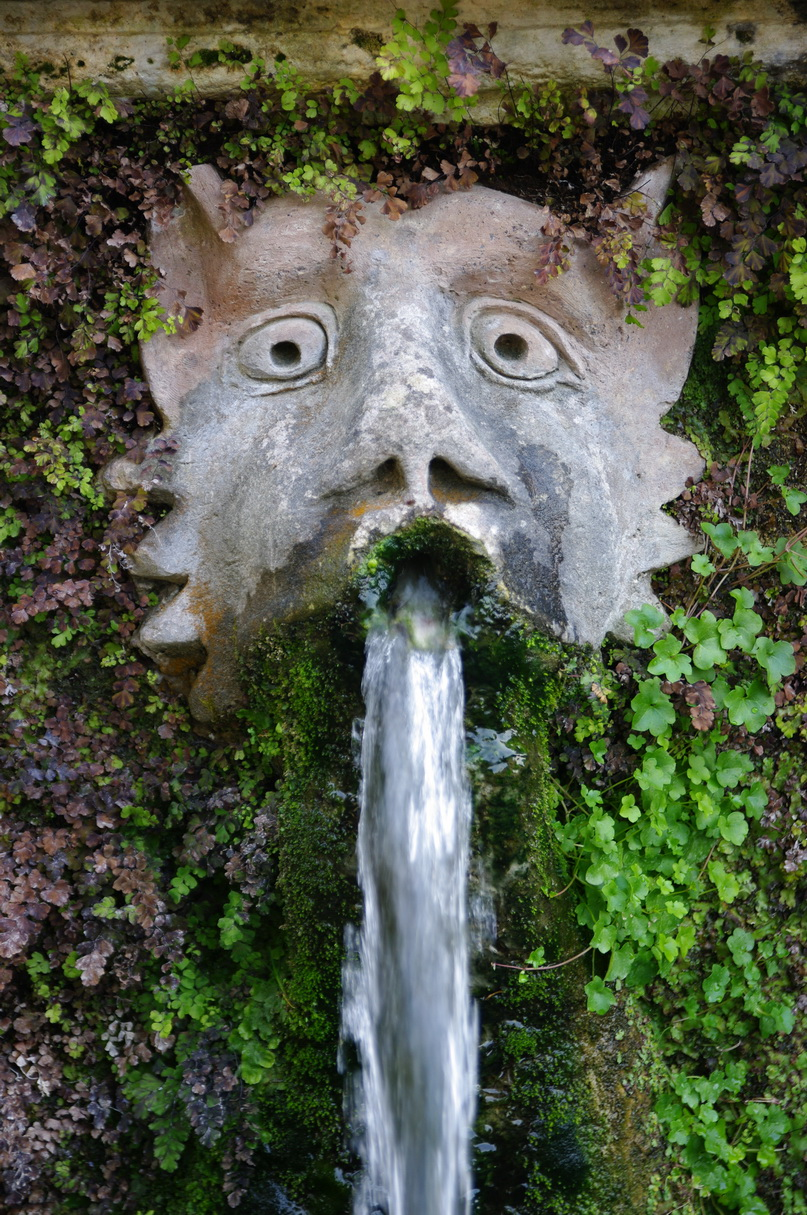
A mask of the Hundred Fountains

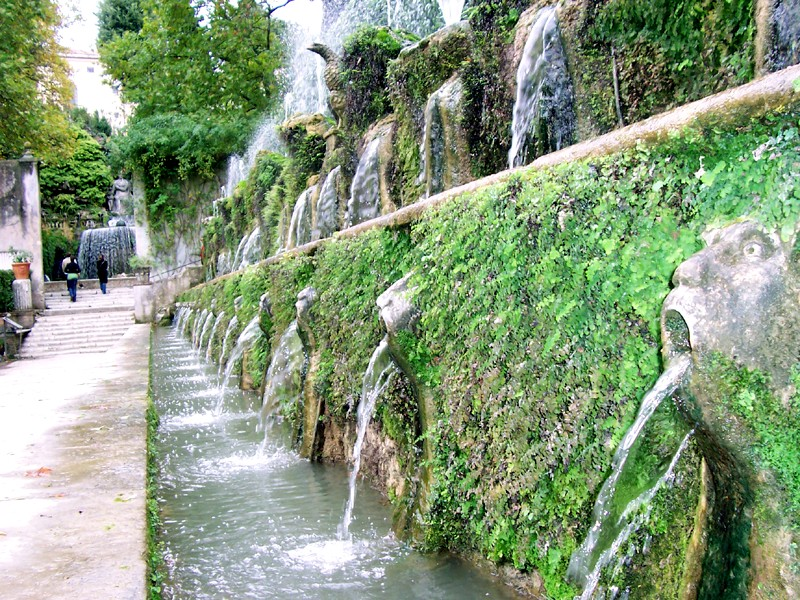
Detail of the Hundred Fountains

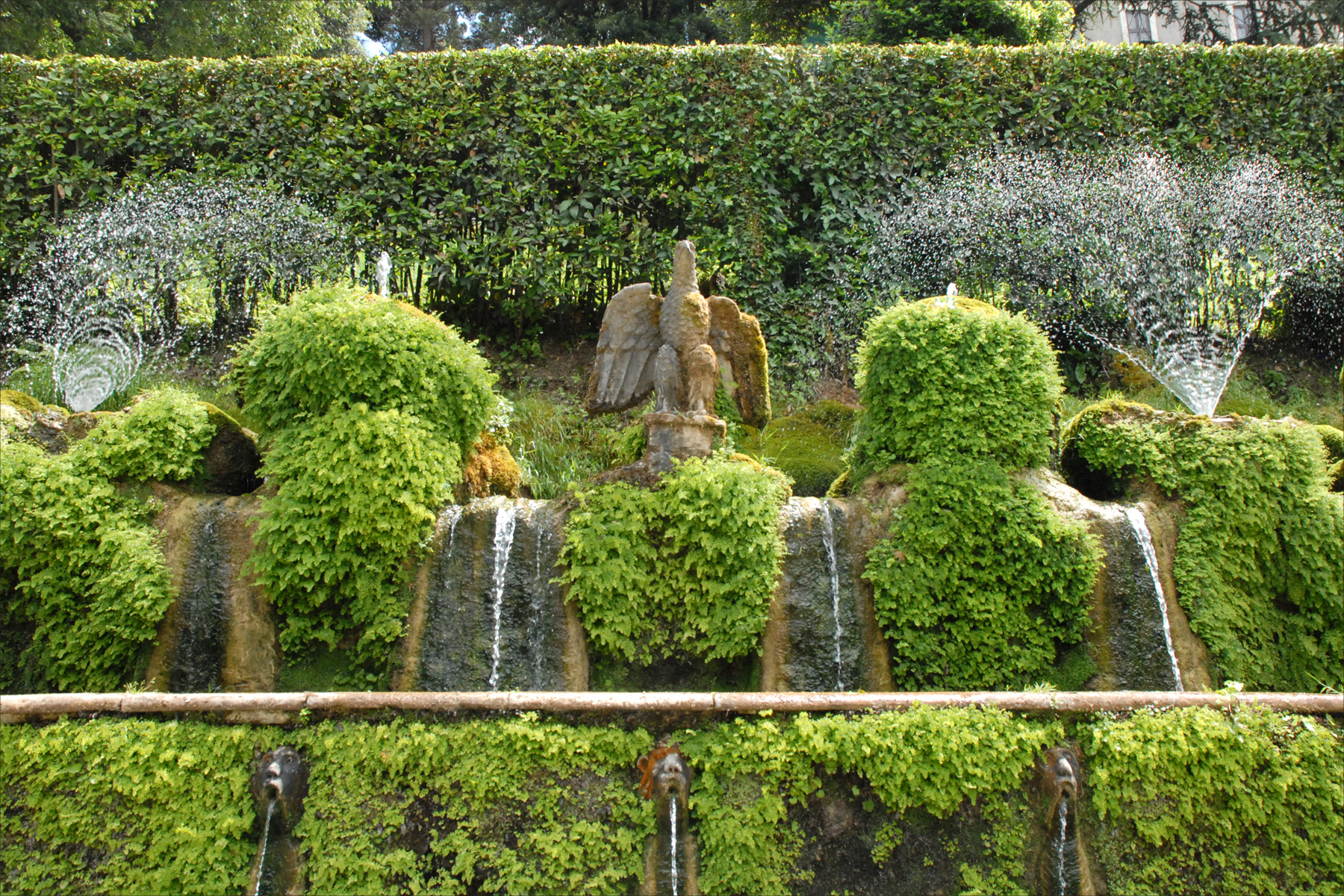
A d'Este eagle among the spouts in the Hundred Fountains

The Hundred Fountains were another celebrated marvel of the gardens in the Renaissance. They are located between the oval fountain and the Fontana di Rometta, and there are actually nearly three hundred spouts fed by three parallel canals, one above the other. Along the edge of the upper canal, spouts in the form of heraldic fleurs-de-lis alternate with eagles—both alluding to the Este family coat of arms, as well as boats and obelisks, each spraying water in a fan-shaped jet.

The fountains were constructed between 1566 and 1577. The original alley of fountains had more decoration, including small boats alternating with terra cotta vases along the upper canal, planted with fruit trees; and the wall was decorated with sculptural plaques showing scenes from the Metamorphosis of Ovid. These deteriorated quickly and were largely removed or replaced. The wall is now so overgrown with vegetation that little of remaining decoration can be seen. It was restored in the 17th century, then abandoned for a long period, and finally restored again in 1930 to its present form. Like every other feature of the garden, canals and the hundred fountains had their part in the symbolic plan; they represented the aqueducts the Romans built to supply water to Rome. The Hundred Fountains have been celebrated in Italian art and literature, particularly in the Roman Elegies of Gabriele d'Annunzio.

To descend to the next level, there are stairs at either end – the elaborate fountain complex called the Rometta ("the little Rome") is at the far left – to view the full length of the Hundred Fountains on the next level, where the water jets fill the long rustic trough, and Pirro Ligorio's Fontana dell'Ovato ends the cross-vista. A visitor may walk behind the water through the rusticated arcade of the concave nymphaeum, which is peopled by marble nymphas by Giambattista della Porta. Above the nymphaeum, the sculpture of Pegasus recalls to the visitor the fountain of Hippocrene on Parnassus, haunt of the Muses.

This terrace is united to the next by the central Fountain of the Dragons, dominating the central perspective of the gardens, erected for a visit in 1572 of Pope Gregory XIII whose coat-of-arms features a dragon. The sound of this fountain was in contrast to a nearby Uccellario with artificial birds. Central stairs lead down a wooded slope to three rectangular fishponds set on the cross-axis at the lowest point of the gardens, terminated at the right by the water organ (now brought back into use) and Fountain of Neptune (belonging to the 20th century restorations).

=== The Fountain of Rometta (Fontana di Rometta) ===
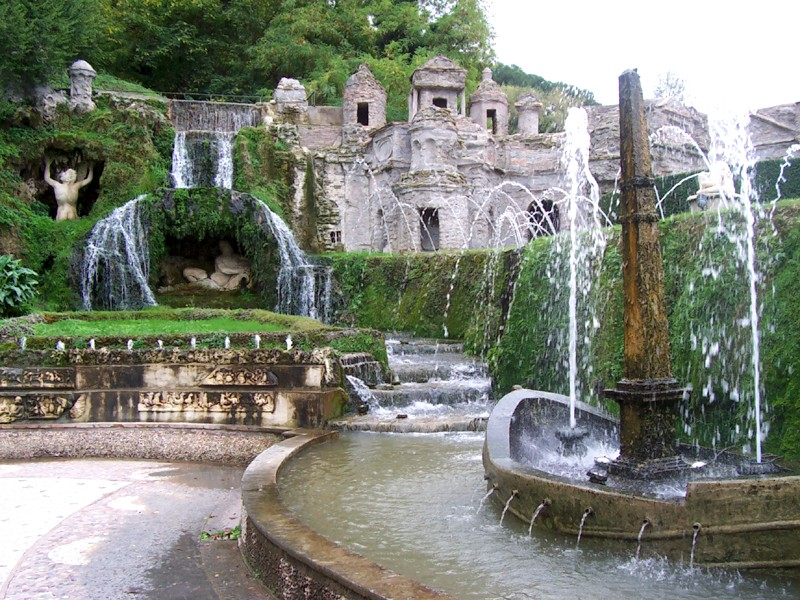
The Rometta fountain, a miniature of ancient Rome

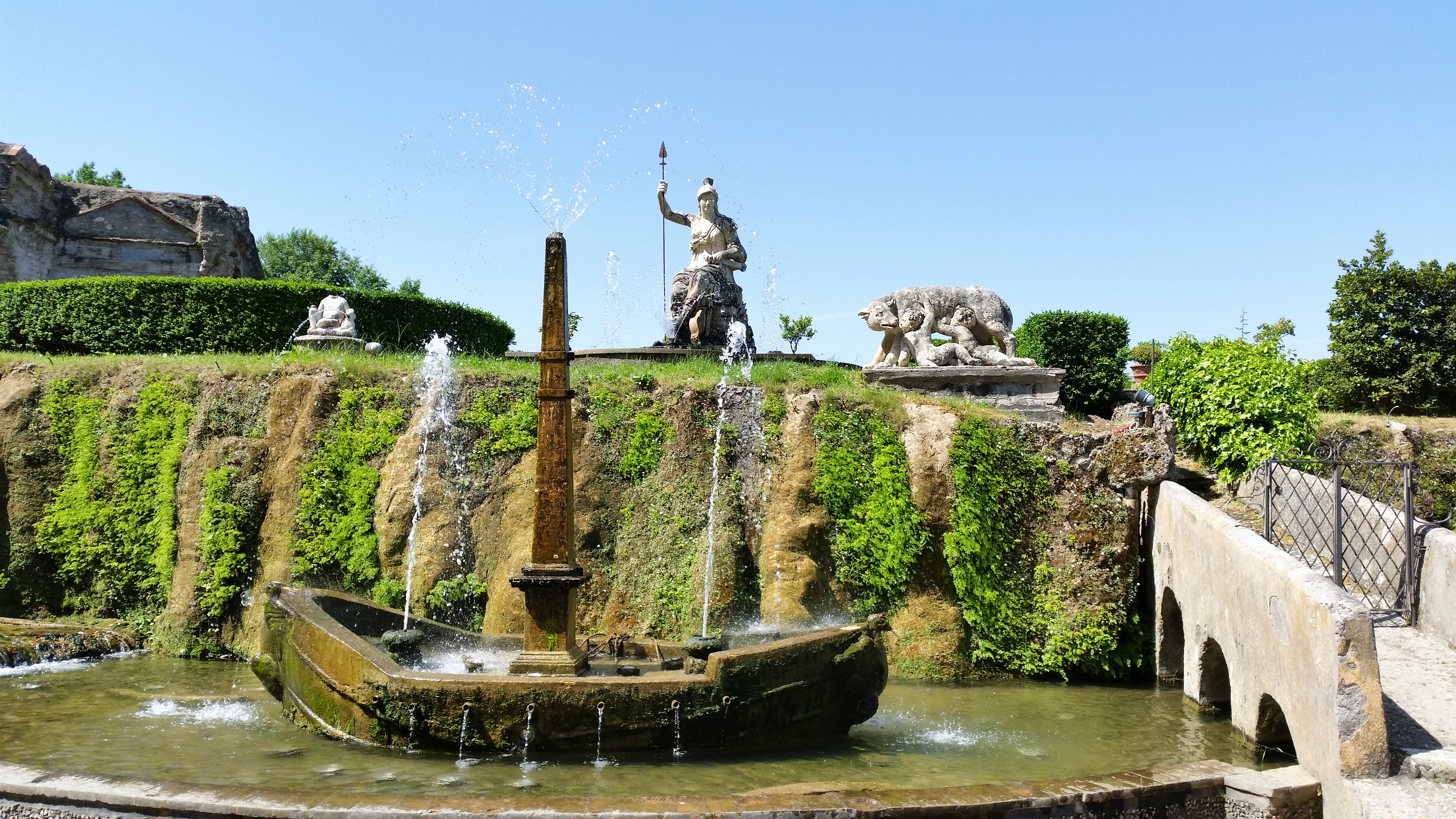
The boat with an obelisk mast, symbolizing the Tiburtina island in the Tiber, below the statue of Rome Triumphant

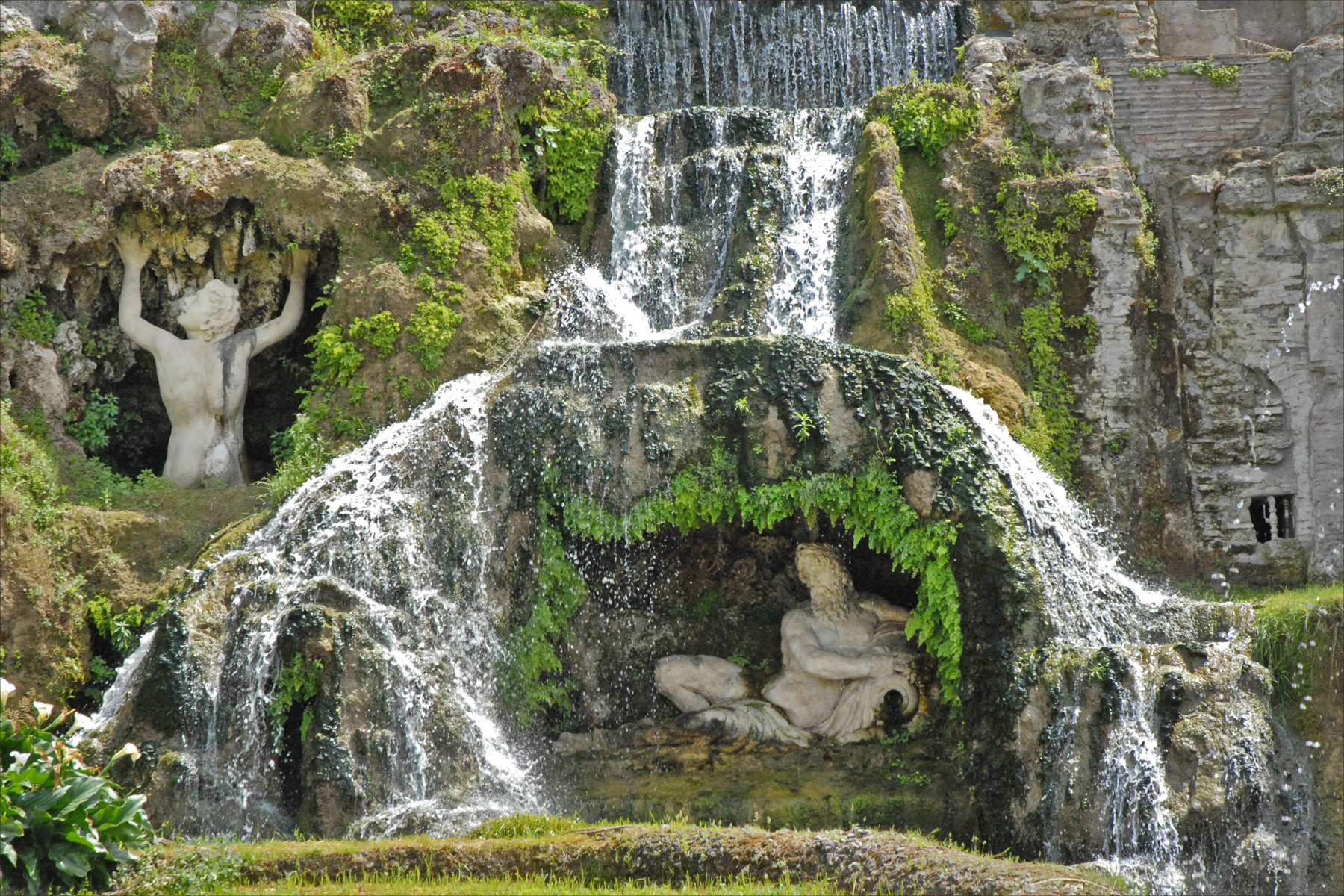
Statues symbolizing the Aniene River (left) and Apennine mountains (right)

The Fountain of Rometta is located at the opposite end of the Hundred Fountains from the Oval Fountain. It is an important piece of the symbolic story told by the upper gardens; the waters of the Tiber River emerge in the Tiburtin Mountains, symbolized by the Oval Fountain, run through the valley (The Hundred Fountains) and arrive at the gates of Rome; the Rometta Fountain is ancient Rome in miniature; the real city was visible in the distance behind the Fountain. The fountain was designed by Pirro Ligorio and built by Curzio Maccarone between 1567 and 1570. The fountain and its architecture are built on a wide semicircular Terrace supported by pilasters connected with a double arcades. The back portion of the fountain represents the buildings the monuments if Rome; deteriorated greatly in the early 19th century, and a large part was demolished in 1850, but a portion of this architecture still stands on the left side of the fountain. The small buildings were divided into seven sections, representing the seven hills of Rome and their most famous monuments. The little city included gates and arches, and even small marble statues. In the center of the miniature city is a large statue of Rome Victorious, made in 1568 by the Fliemish sculptor Pierre de la Motte, facing the statue of the Tiburtine Sibyl at the other end of the row of Hundred Fountains. Another statue by the same artist, The She Wolf nurses her Twins, was placed in the garden in 1611. The water flowing through fountain basin next to the city represents the Tiber River; the boat in the fountain, with a mast in the form an obelisk, symbolizes the Tiburtina Island.

A new feature was added to the Fountain of Rometta in the early 17th century; an artificial mountain, pierced by grottos and caves, to left of the city buildings. On the top of the artificial mountain is a statue of the river god Aniene, holding in his hand a miniature of the Temple of the Sibyl. A statue of a figure representing the Apennine mountains, holding a mountain in his arms. is half-hidden in a grotto.

=== The Fountain of the Dragons (Fontana dei Draghi) ===
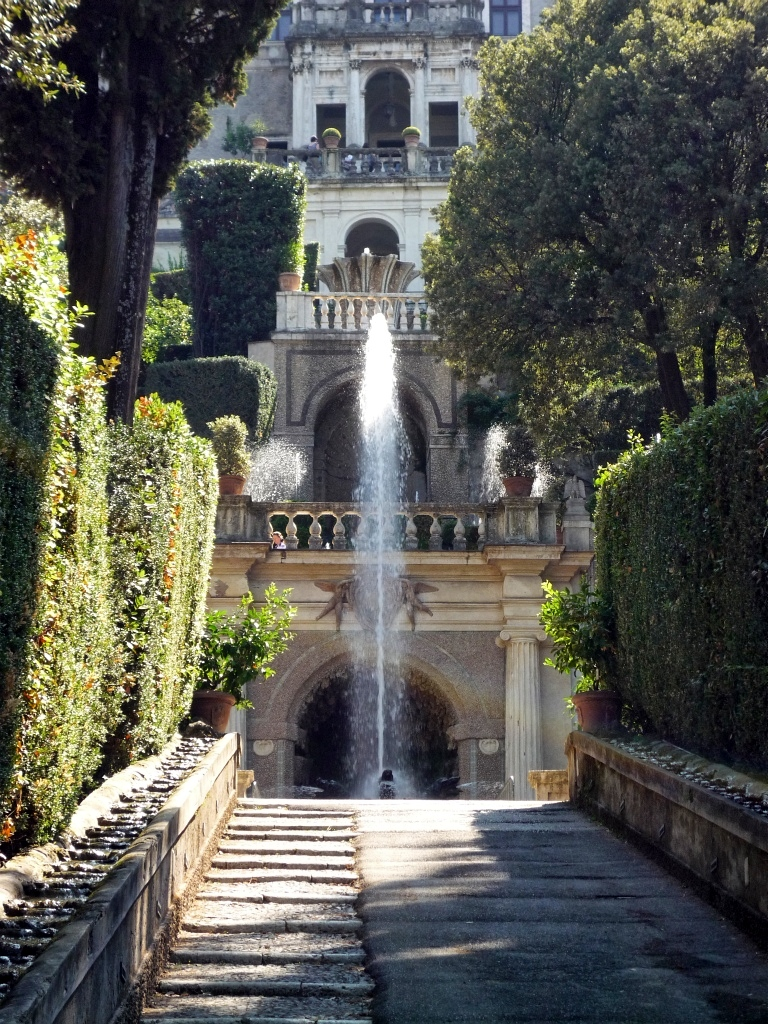
The jet of the Fountain of the Dragons, viewed from below

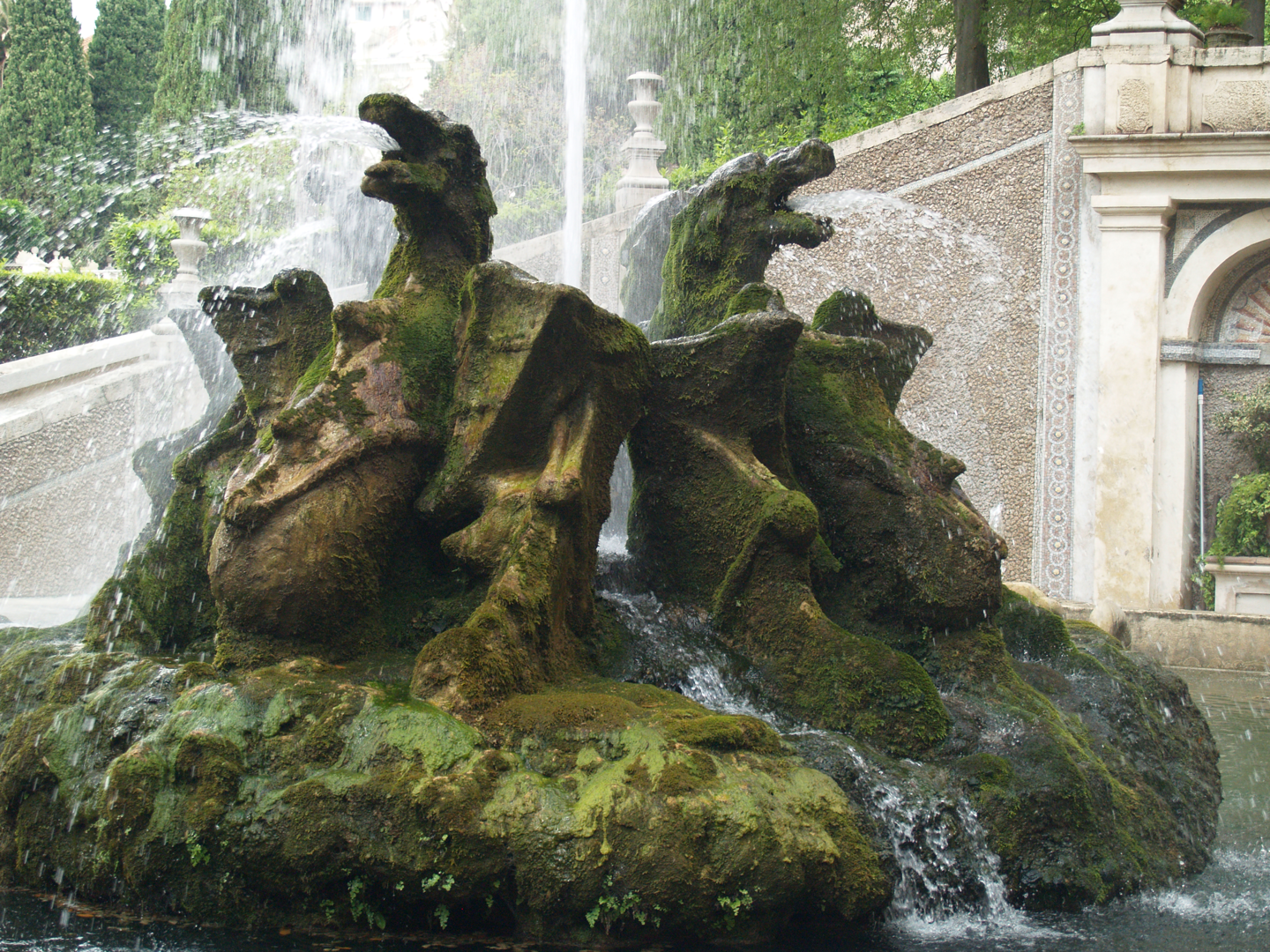
The four dragons

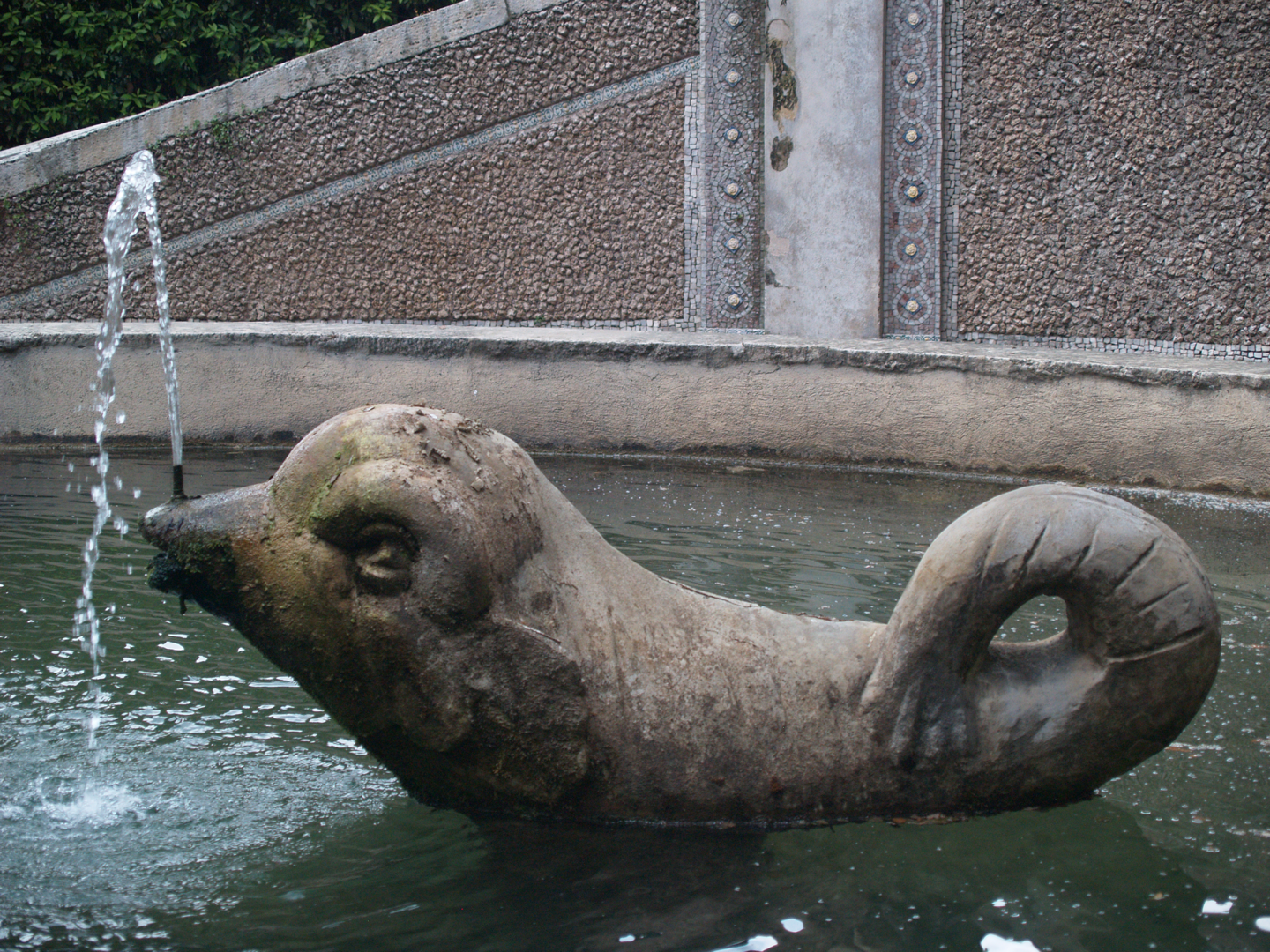
A dolphin in the fountain of the dragons

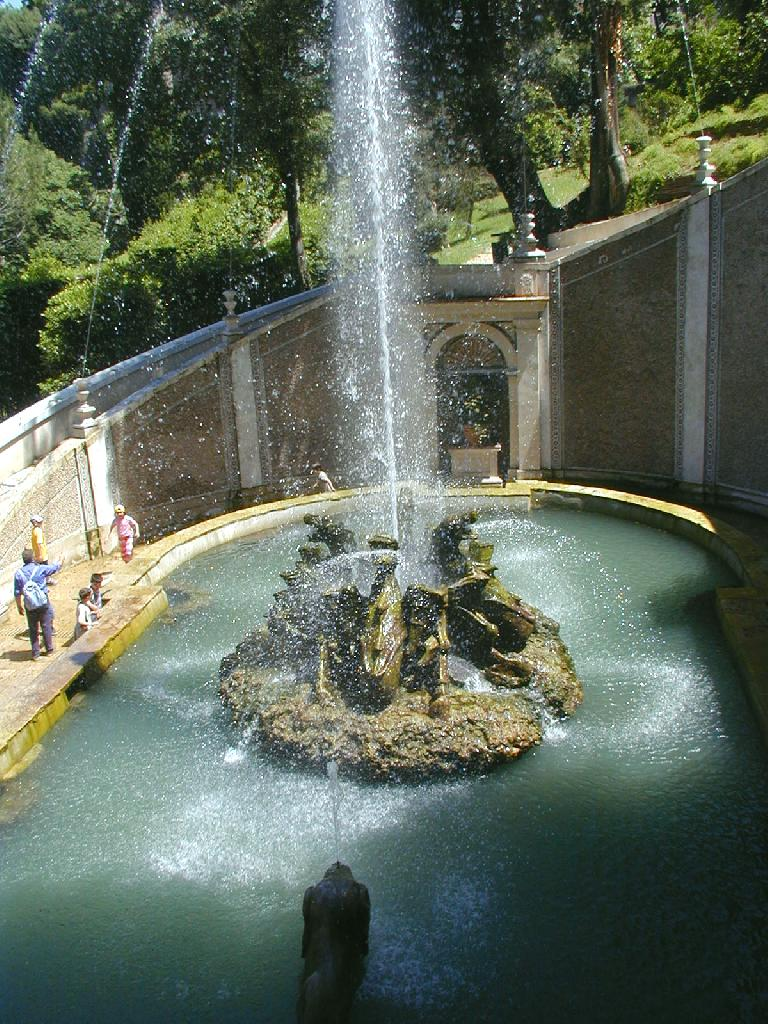
The fountain of the dragons from above

The Fountain of the Dragons was designed by Pirro Ligorio to illustrate the story of Hercules fulfilling one of his labors by stealing the golden apples of the Garden of the Hesperides, which were guarded by the dragon Ladon. The same story is illustrated in frescoes in the interior decoration of the Villa.

The fountain is located on the central vertical axis of the gardens, aligned with the Villa, and in the center of the original garden. just below the Hundred Fountains. It is enclosed by two semi-circular ramps which lead to the level above. The walls of the ramps around it are covered with pebbly tartar and ornamented with bands of mosaic and majolica tile, and contain two large niches. Ligorio planned this fountain to illustrate the theme of war and combat against evil; he intended that one niche would be occupied by a statue of Hercules with his club, before he killed the dragon Ladon; and the second with statues of Mars, the god of War, Perseus, and gladiators. In the center of the fountain is a small scogliera or island, which holds four sculpted dragons, which jet water from their mouths into the fountain, while a powerful central fountain shoots a column of water vertically high in the air, visible from all around the garden This idea of a vertical jet of water as the centerpiece of the garden was copied in many baroque gardens in the 17th and 18th centuries. In addition to the dragons, two sculpted dolphins spray water across the pool. More water flows down from above, running in channels attached to the parapets of the ramps. The water emerges from the breasts of two sphinxes- half-women, half sea horses; flows down a channel, enters the mouth of a sculpted frog, and emerges again through the mouth of a carved salamander. In keeping with the theme of combat against evil, in Ippolito's time the fountains also produced dramatic sound effects heard throughout the garden; water kept under pressure was suddenly released, imitating the sound of fireworks or cannons firing. To make more noise, the flow of water from above could also be from a fine spray to a heavy downpour.

Ippolito had the fountain altered for the visit of Pope Gregory in 1572. The dragon with one hundred heads was replaced by four dragons, the family emblem of the Pope. Ippolito died three months later, and the fountain was still not completed. It was not finished until late in the 17th century with a different sculptural program; Instead of a statue of Hercules, a statue of the god Jupiter holding lightning bolts in his hands was placed in the central niche. The cannon-like sound effects from the fountain now were meant to be the sound of his thunderbolts.

=== The Fountain of the Owl (Fontana della Civetta) ===
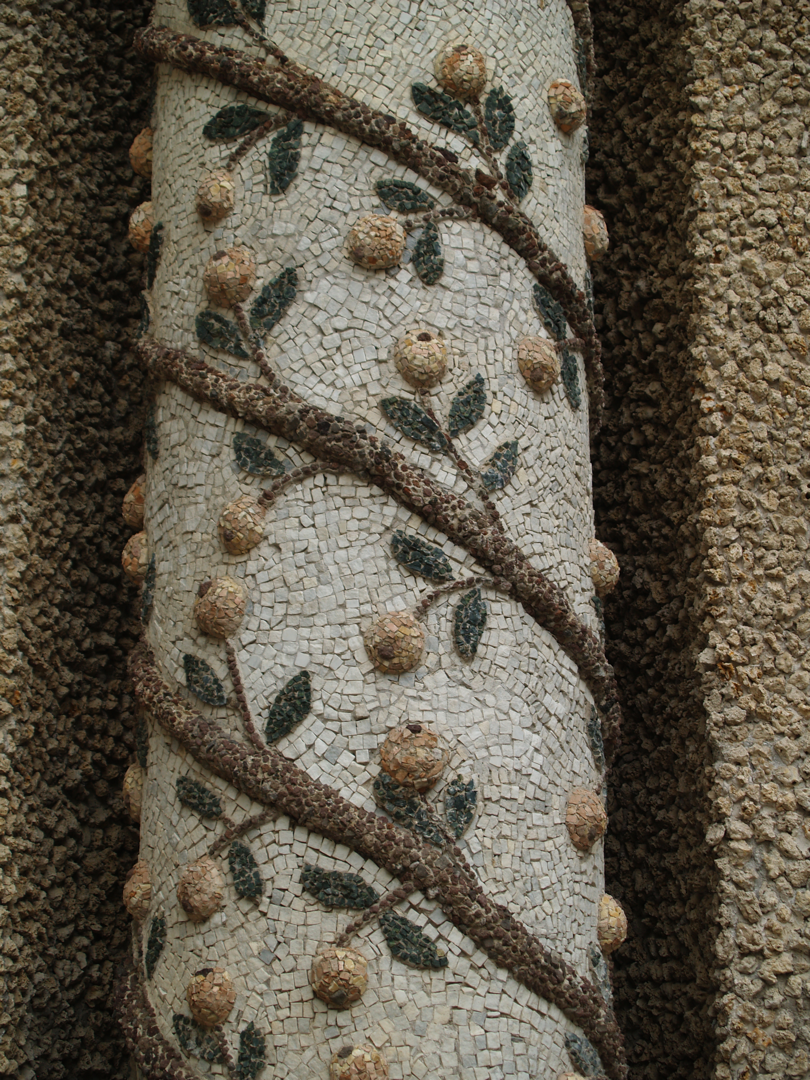
Mosaic decoration on the columns depicting the Golden Apples of the Hesperides

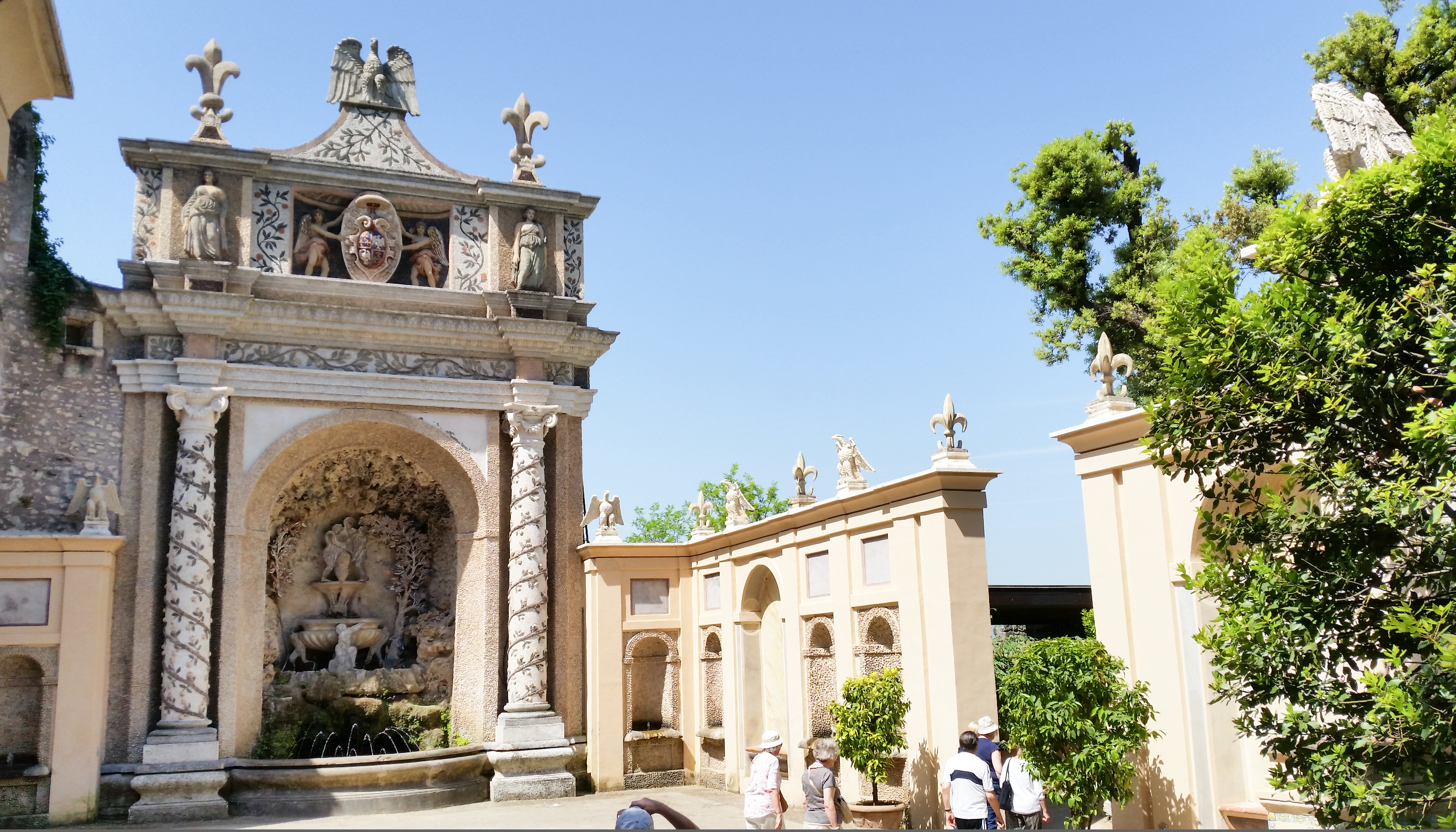
Courtyard of the Fountain of the Owl

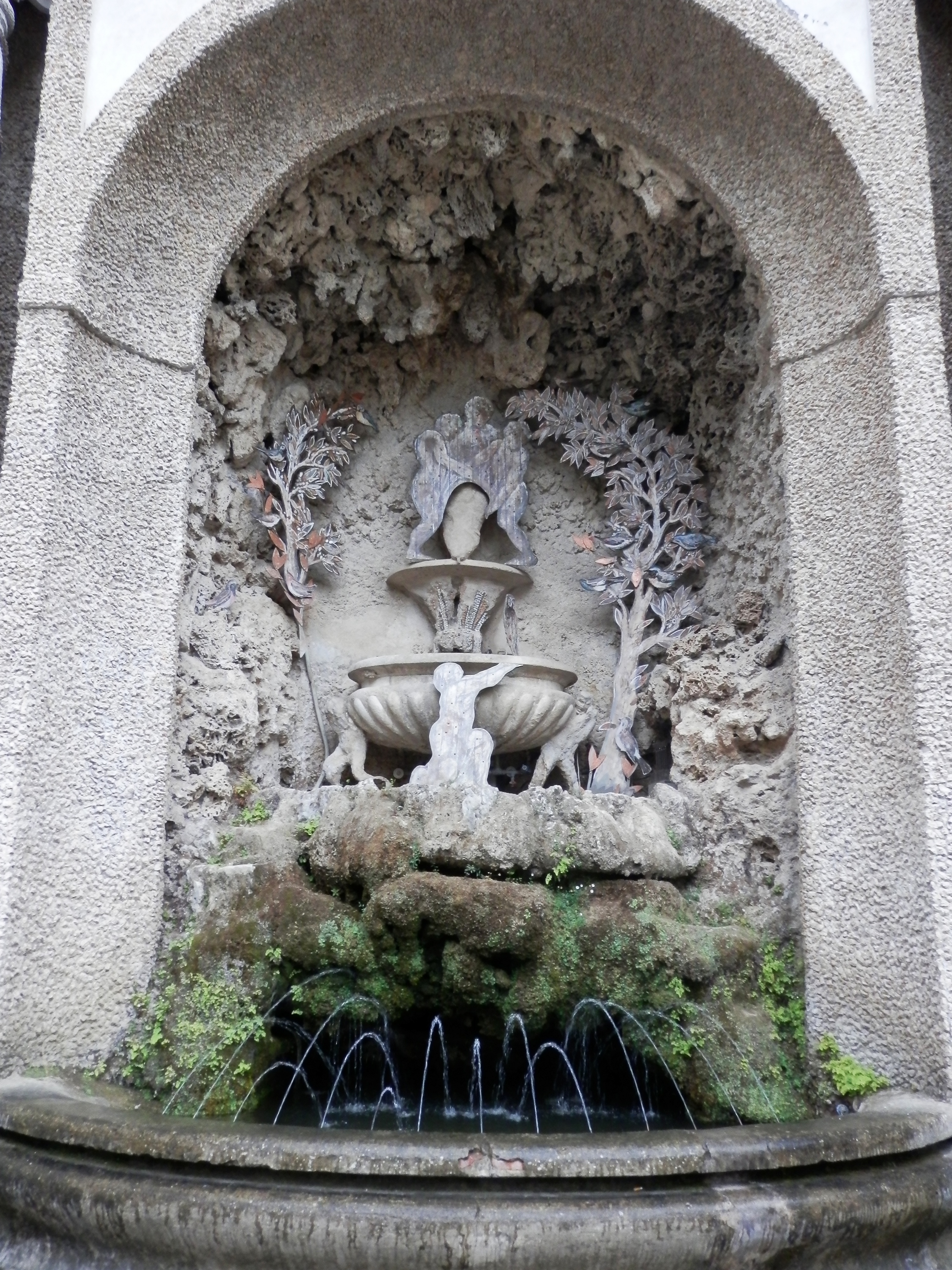
The Fountain of the Owl. Some of the original sculptural figures are replaced by cutouts.

The Fountain of the Owl is located in the Southwest part of the garden, below the Fountain of Rometta and the Fountain of Persephone, These three fountains form a single unit of architecture, their terraces connected by stairways, with nymphaeums placed beneath the terraces. The Fountain of the Owl was built between 1565 and 1569 by Giovanni del Duca. Compared with other fountains in the garden, it is very formal, placed on a terrace surrounded by walls with niches, crowned with the white eagles and lily symbols of the d'Este. The fountain itself is a separate structure, entirely covered with polychrome tiles. At the top, above the niche, is the coat of arms of the d'Este, held by two angels. The niche is flanked by ionic columns. Originally it contained the statues of two youths holding a goatskin which poured water into a basin held by three satyrs. The sculpture in the niche, believed lost, was rediscovered during a renovation in 2001–02, hidden under mineral deposits and earth. The architectural elements were intact, but the figures of the youths and satyrs were missing or destroyed.

This fountain also produced music, thanks to an ingenious automaton made by the French fountain engineer Luc Leclerc, installed in 1566, before the Fountain of the Organ on the other side of the garden. It featured twenty painted bronze birds placed in the niche, posed on two metal olive branches. Each bird sang an individual song, produced by piped water and air. A mechanical owl appeared, and the birds stopped singing; then, at the end of the performance, all the birds sang together. This musical feature was admired and copied in other European gardens and functioned until the end of the 17th century. It needed constant repair due to the action of the water on its delicate mechanism, and by the 19th century were completely ruined. The decorative elements of the fountain were completely restored in the 1930s, and restored again in 2001–2002.

During the restoration work of 2001–02, the workers found some of the original mechanism that produced the bird songs, including the wind chamber, the tubes that moved the air and water, and the machinery that made the owl move. Using modern materials, Leonardo Lombardi was able to make a new version of the old machinery so the birds can sing and move again.

=== The Fountain of Persephone (Fontana di Proserpina) ===
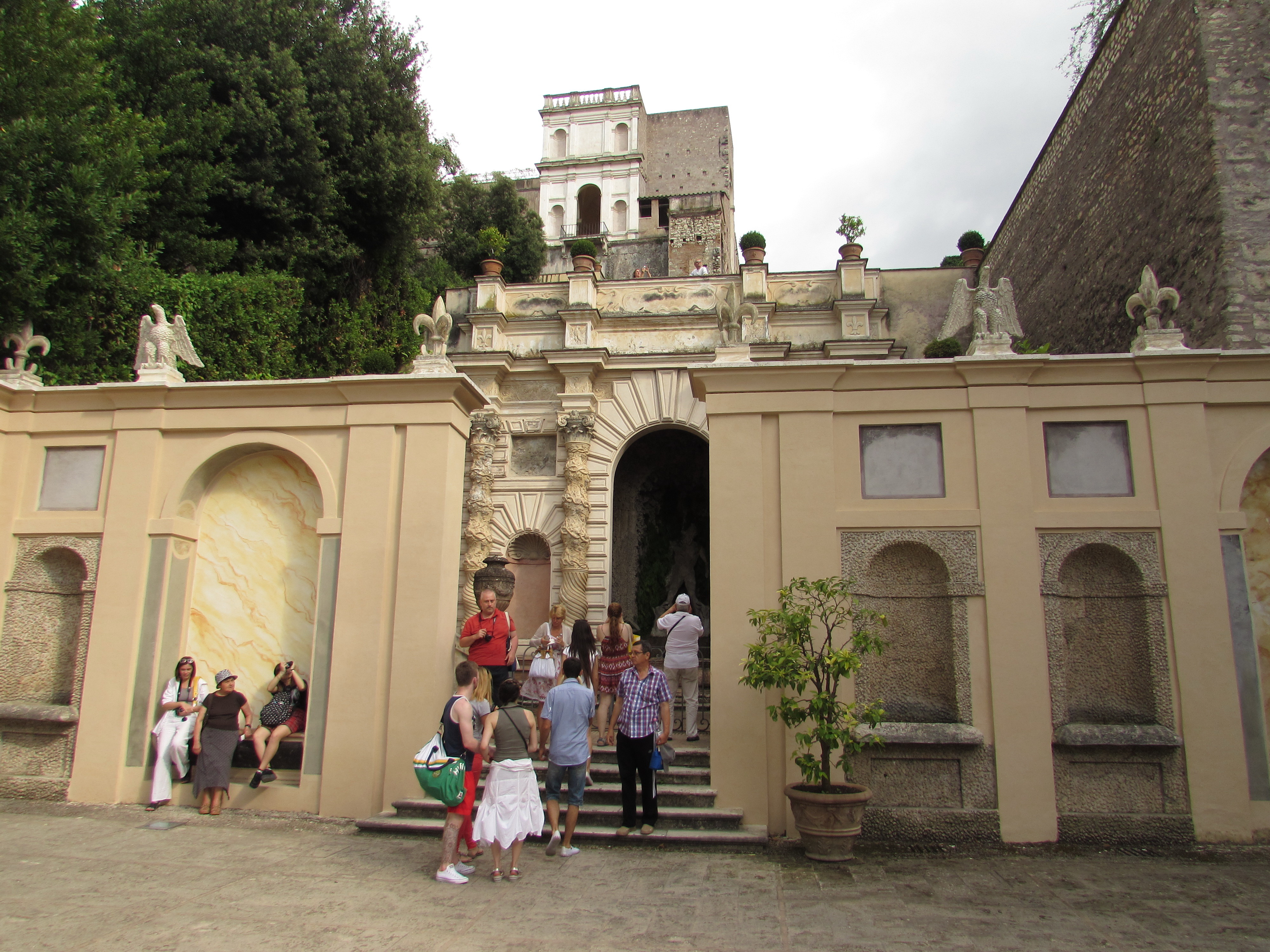
Stairway from the Fountain of the Owl up to the Fountain of Persephone, with Rometta Fountain visible above

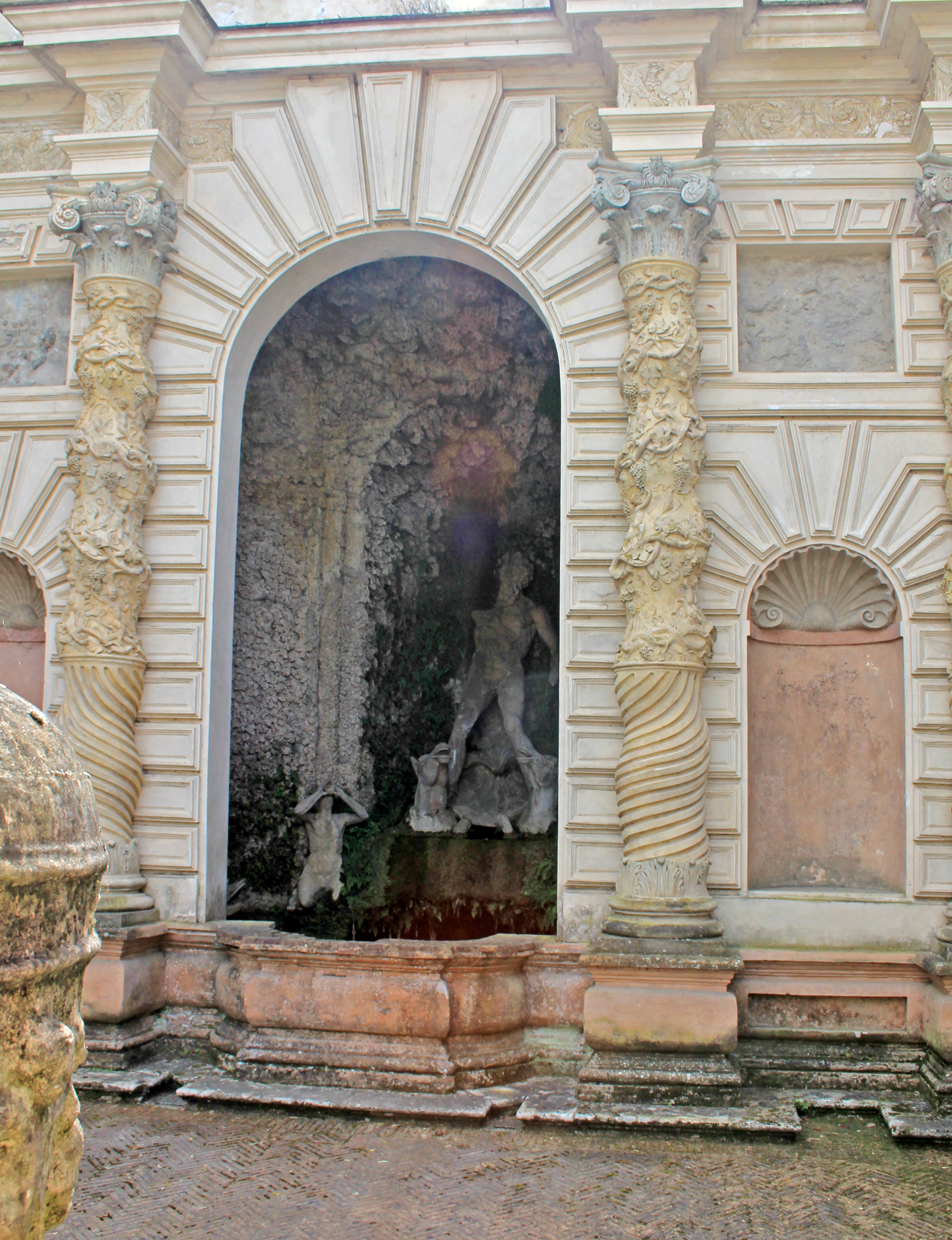
The Fountain of Persephone

The Fountain of Persephone is located just above the Fountain of the Owl; a stairway connects them. It was sometimes called the Fountain of the Emperors, because it was originally intended to display statues of four Roman Emperors who had villas in the region: Julius Caesar, Augustus Caesar, Trajan and Hadrian. It was designed and built by Alberto Galvani in 1569–70. It was connected with the Rometta Fountain above by two stairways (only one remains today) whose parapets support channels of water pouring through shells and masks. The stairways close two sides of the small fountain courtyard. The fountain is placed in a triumphal arch between the stairways. The arch is framed by twisting columns, similar to those in Saint Peter's basilica in Rome. The central niche held a statue of the goddess of fertility Persephone being kidnapped by Pluto, placed there in about 1640. The statue of Persephone has disappeared; Pluto remains, carried on a shell supported by two sea horses. Niches on the sides hold statues of Tritons riding dolphins and blowing on their buccina, or seashell trumpets.

=== The Fountain of the Organ (Fontana dell'Organo) ===
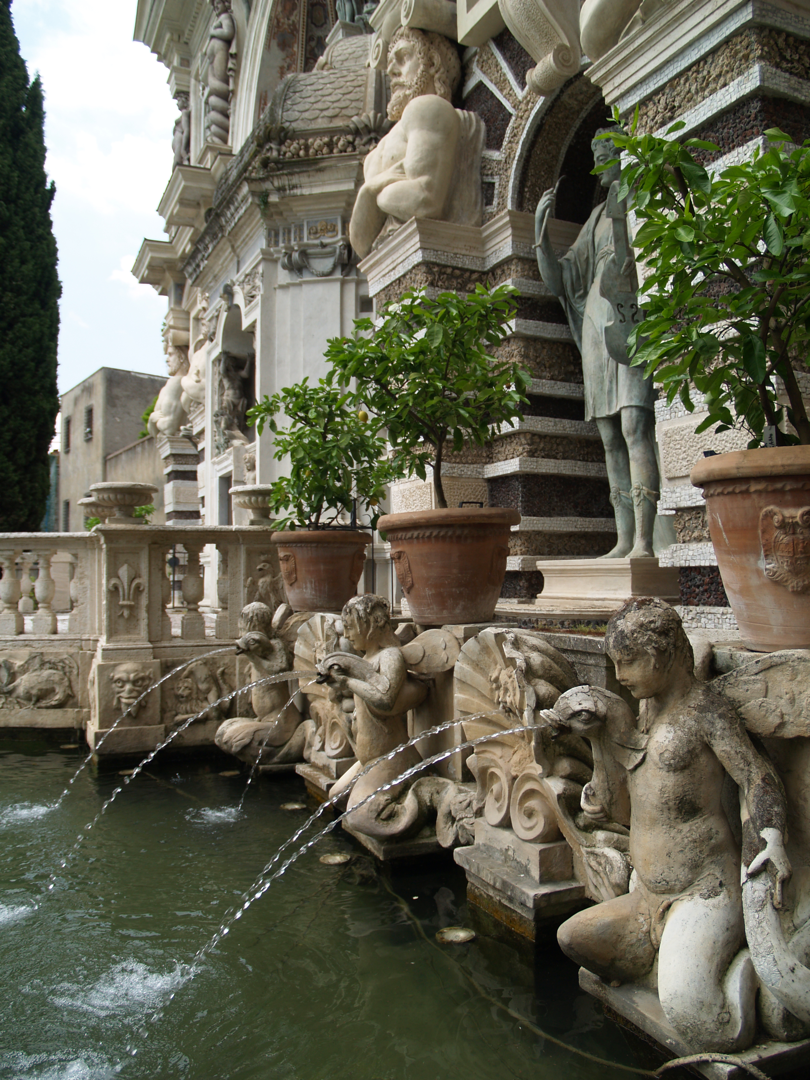
Detail of the Fountain of the Organ

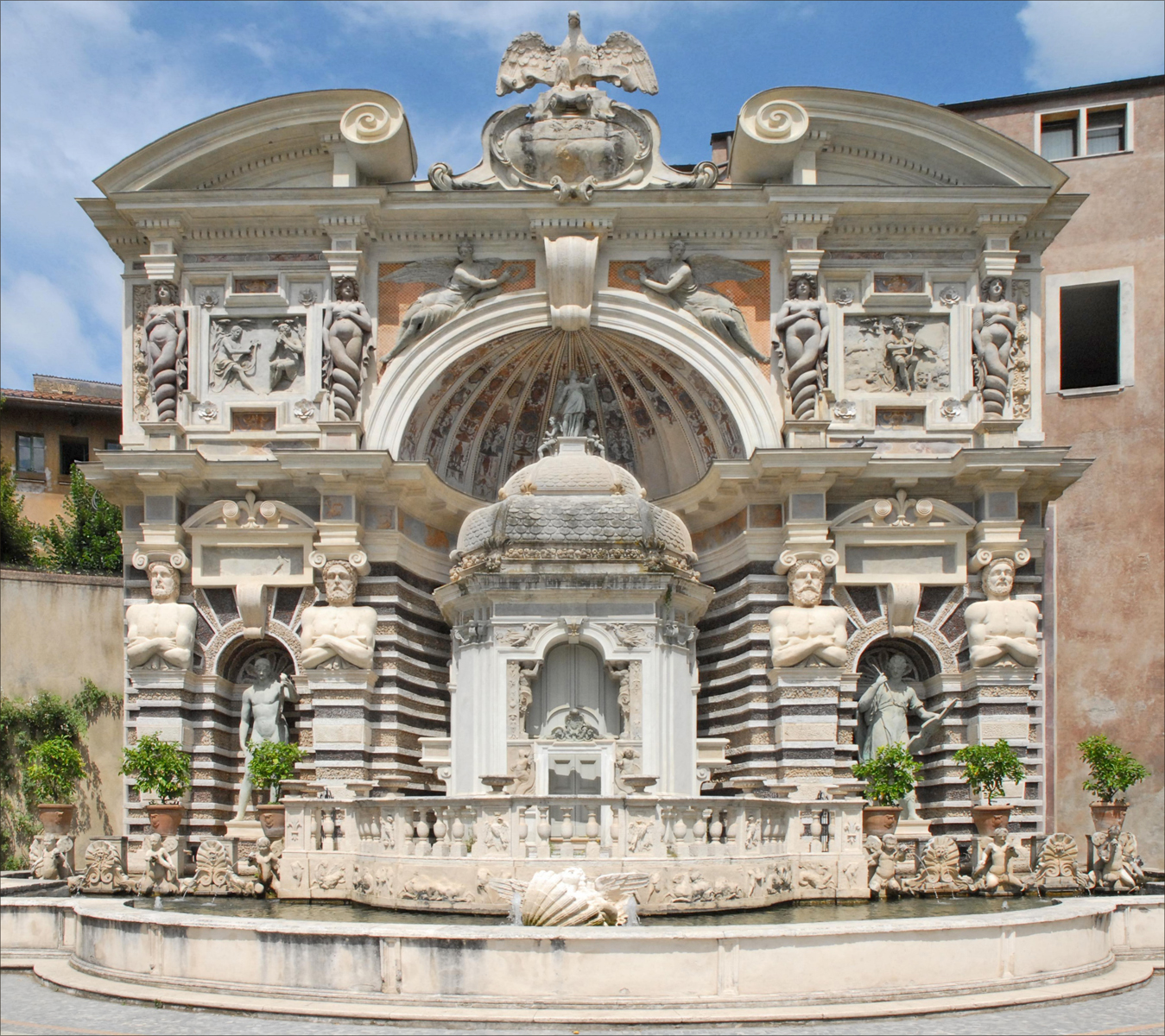
The Fountain of the Organ, with its Castellum aqua, or water castle, behind it.

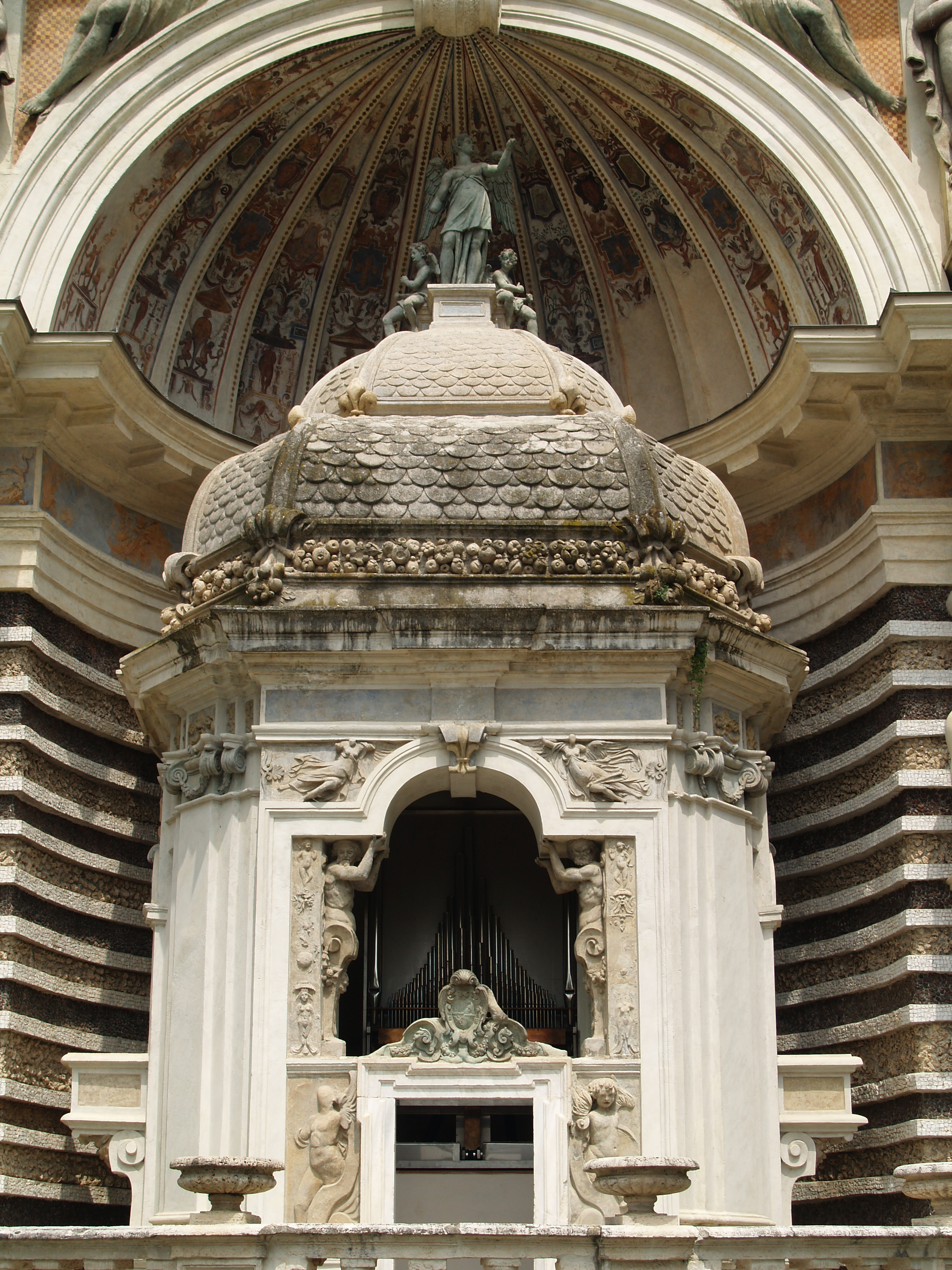
The kiosk containing the keyboard of the water organ

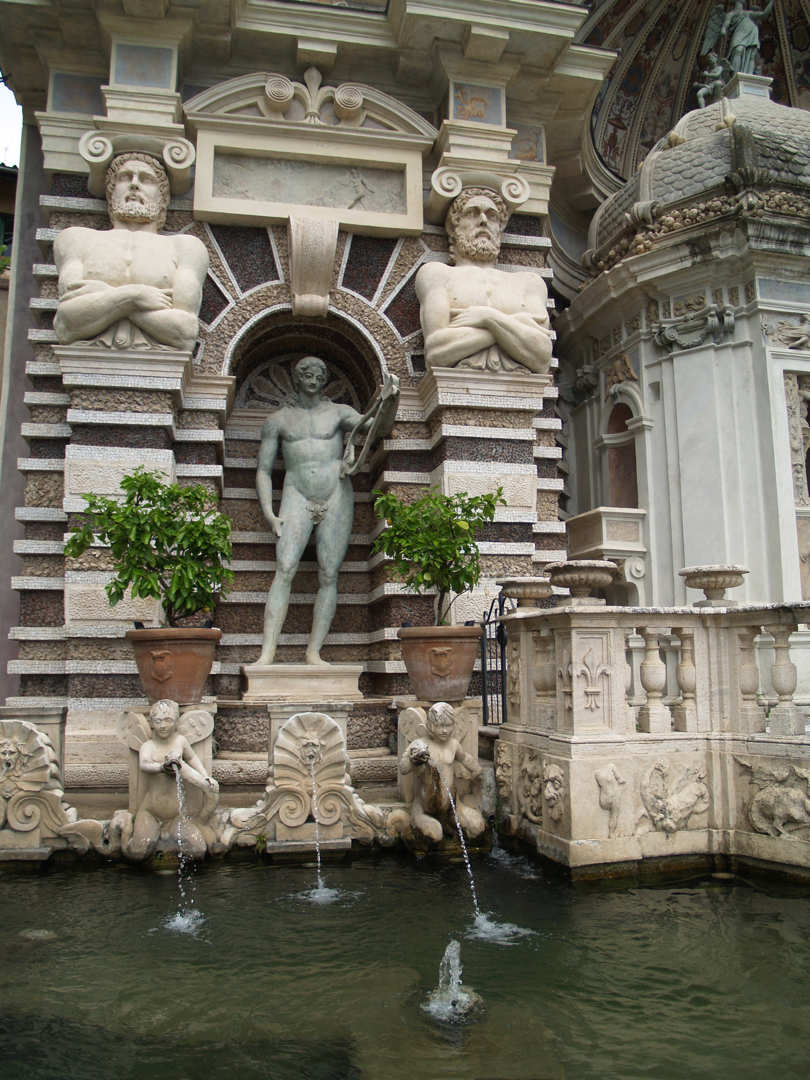
Statue of Apollo on the facade of the Water Castle.

The Fountain of the Organ (Fontana dell'Organo) is one of the most famous features of the garden; it was described and imitated throughout Europe. Work on the masonry structure began in 1566. The fountain itself was made by the French fountain engineer Luc Leclerc and his nephew Claude Venard. After the death of Leclerc, Venard invented the ingenious mechanism of the water organ, which was installed in 1571.

The fountain was the first of its kind, and astonished everyone who heard it; when Pope Gregory XIII visited the villa in 1572, accompanied by his court of cardinals and princes, he insisted on inspecting the interior of the fountain, to learn if someone was not concealed inside making the music.

A massive masonry arch behind the fountain, the castellum aquae or water castle, conceals the water reservoir and the hydraulic machinery of the fountain. The original design featured a grotto in the niche of the arch, with a view of the twenty-two pipes of the organ. A statue of Mother Nature or the Ephesian Diana was placed in front of the arch in 1569; it now has its own fountain in the lower garden.

The water creating the music arrived first at the top of the Castellum aquae. It went first through a series of whirlpools, which mixed air with the water; then it dropped down a pipe into the camera aeolia, or wind chamber, where the air and water were separated; the water turned a wheel, rotating a cylinder which opened the valves of the twenty-two pipes, so the air could pass through the pipes and make the music.

The original performances of the fountain began with the sound of two trumpets, held by the statue of Fame on the cornice of the fountain. Then came the music, likely madrigals played by four or five pipes; then the climax: "The Flood", a cascade of water from the top of the fountain, and jets of water shooting up from the fountain below. This was accompanied by the sound of a horn held by a Triton in the fountain; the horn blew softly, then loudly, then softly again.

The mechanism of the fountain was extremely delicate and required continual cleaning and maintenance. The fountain was restored in the early 18th century by Cardinal Alessandro d'Este, who added the white d'Este eagle to the top of the castellum aquae, and ornamented the facade with statues of Orpheus and Apollo; Caryatids and Winged Victories; and bas-reliefs of Orpheus entrancing the animals and a musical contest between Apollo and Marsia. The organ itself was entirely redone. It was given a keyboard with a wider range of notes and was housed in an octagonal kiosk with a cupola. The organ was restored several more times in the 17th century, but by the end of the 18th century, it had deteriorated beyond hope of repair.

In 2003, after a long and delicate restoration, the organ was able to play again. The original wind chamber and tank for creating whirlpools were retained, and the rest of the mechanism was replaced with new machinery in modern materials following the original principles. It now has 144 pipes, and is controlled by a cylinder, operated by the water, which can play four pieces of late Renaissance music for a total of four minutes.

=== The Fountain of Neptune (Fontana di Nettuno) and the Fish ponds (Peschiere) ===
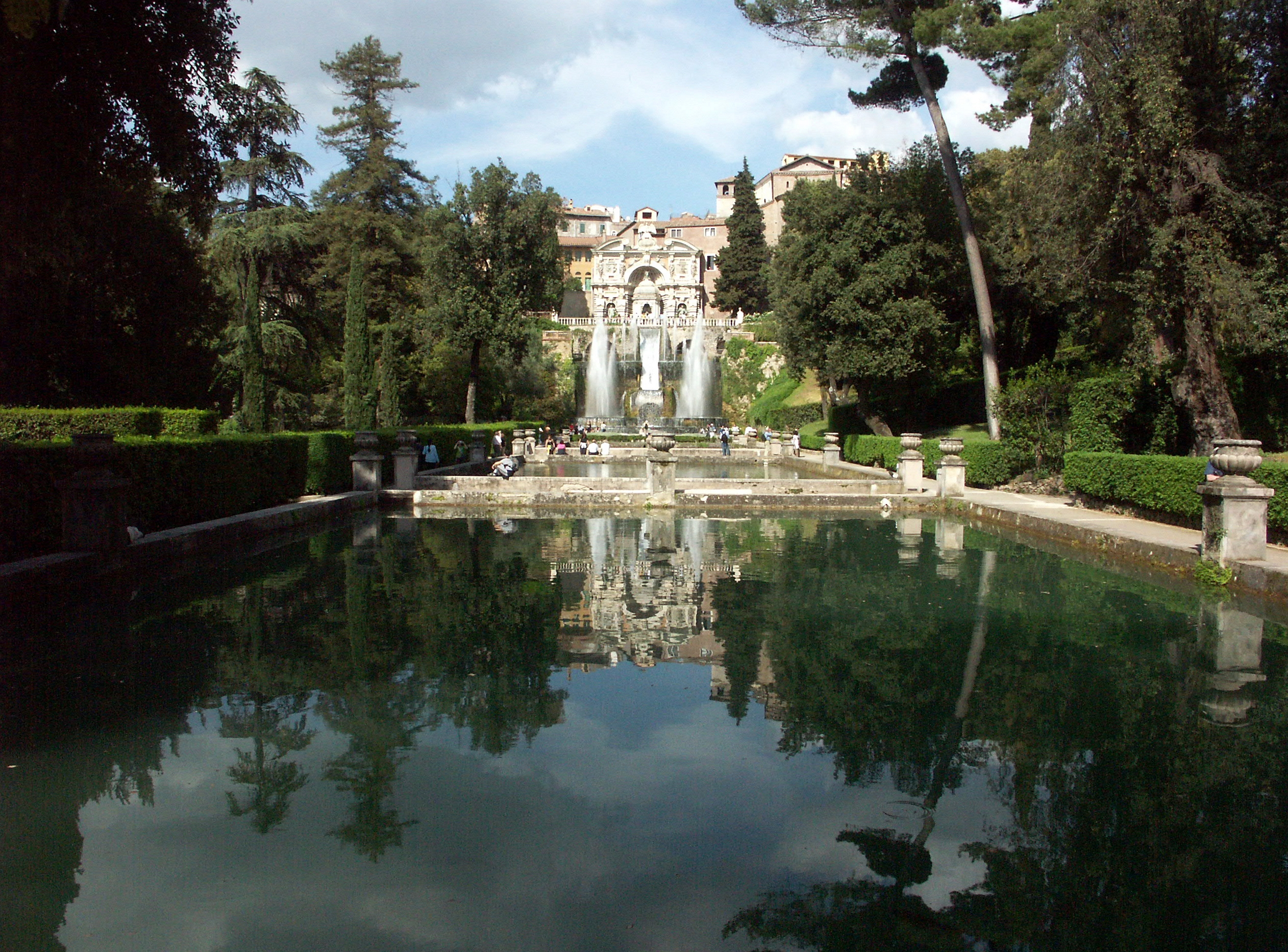
The Fountain of Neptune across the fish ponds

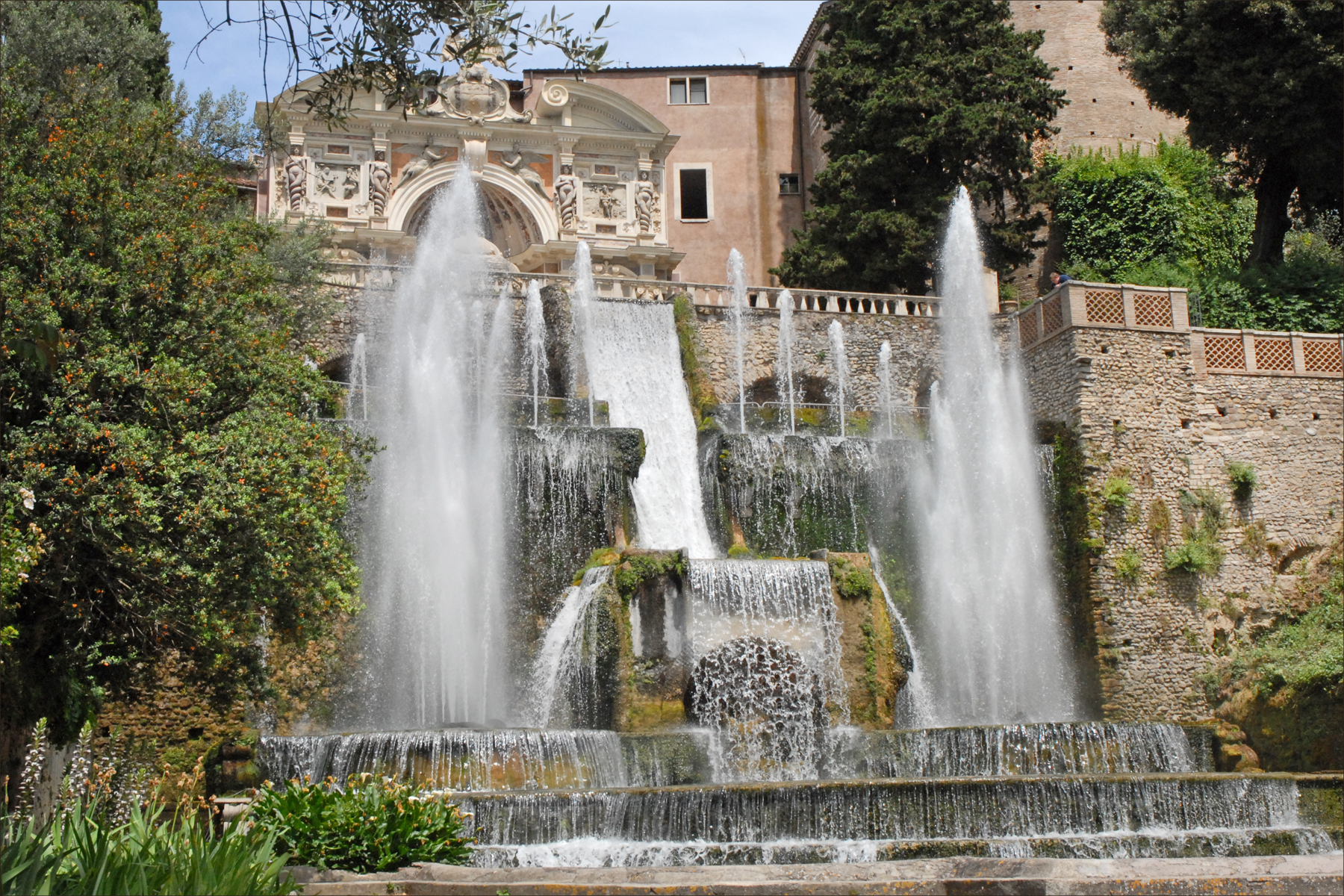
The fountain of Neptune

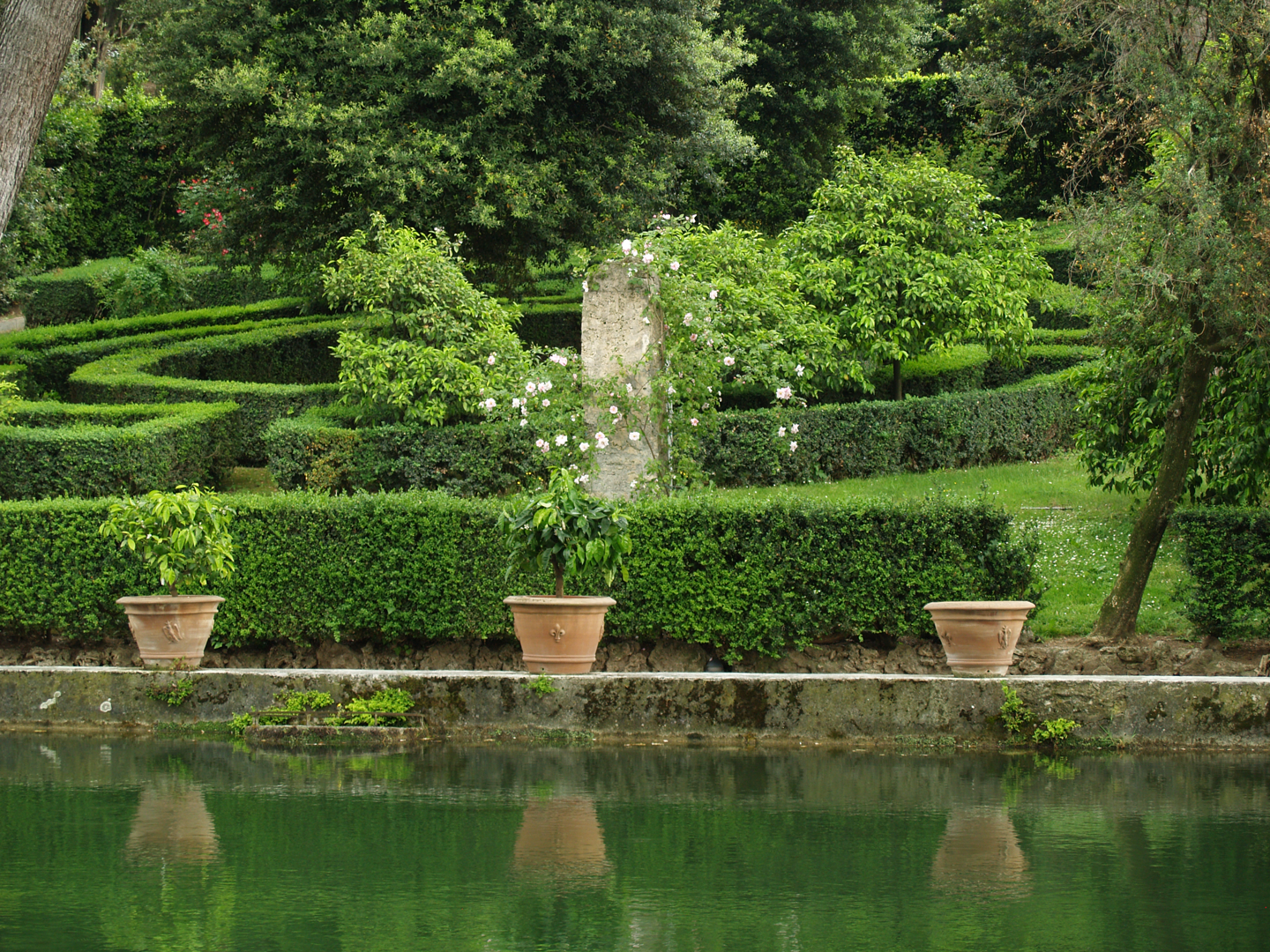
Border of the fish ponds

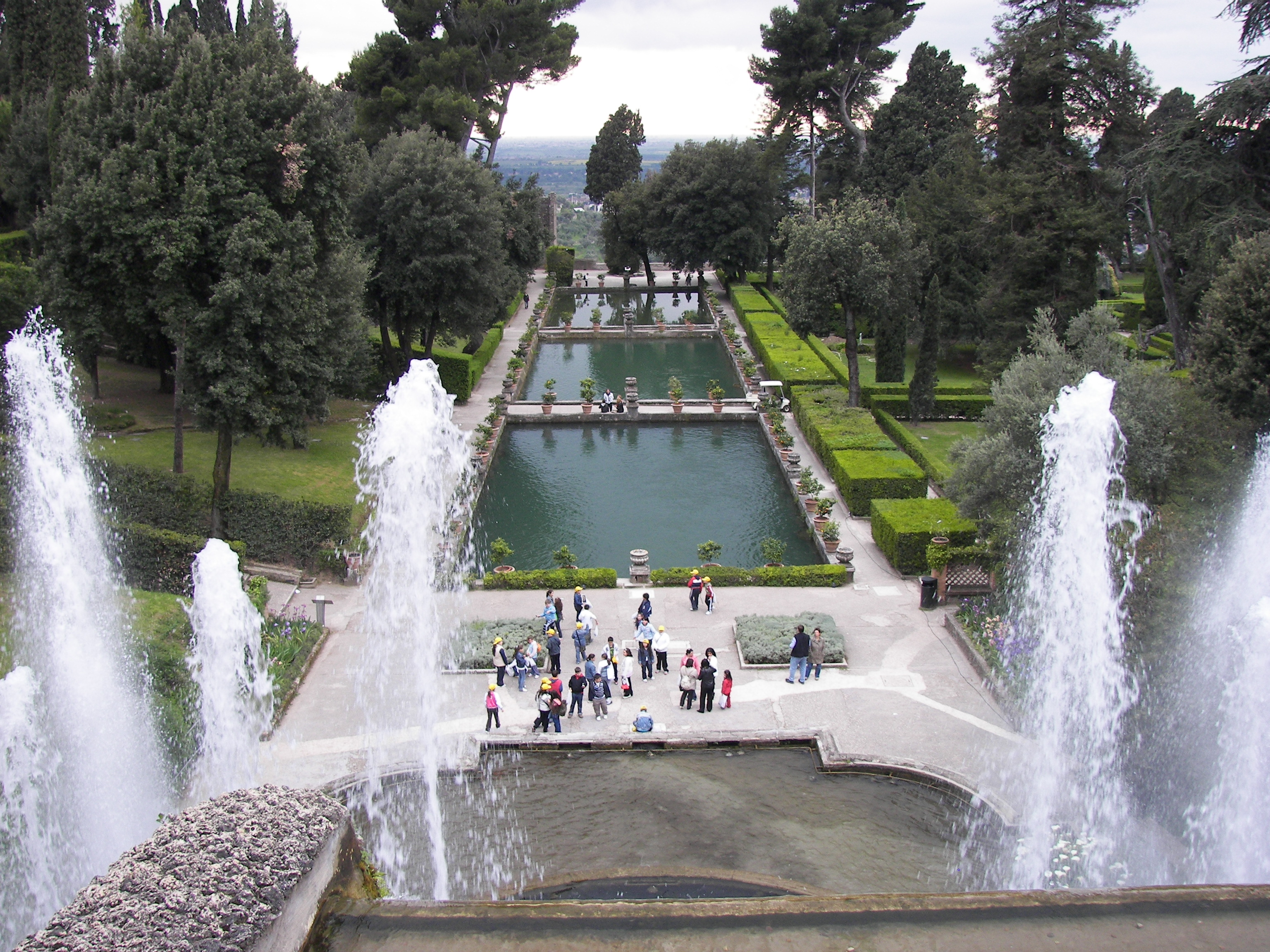
The fish ponds seen from the Fountain of the Organ

Directly below the Fountain of the Organ, and receiving the water from the upper fountain, is the Fountain of Neptune, a work created in the 20th century to replace a garden landmark which had deteriorated.

The space was originally occupied by a rocky cascade, created in the 17th century by Gian Lorenzo Bernini. It was commissioned by Cardinal Rinado I d'Este as a background for the lateral axis of the garden, unfinished by Cardinal Ippolito. Bernini's plan called for a waterfall from the Fountain of the Organ which leaped over the grottoes of the Sibyls, then cascaded down a rocky slope to a lake decorated with reefs and statues. Two additional cascades entered the lake from the sides. Bernini designed the cascade to produce a thunderous sound of falling water. Bernini's cascade was reproduced in paintings and engravings, and was imitated in other gardens in Italy and as far away as England. The cascade was entirely neglected for two centuries, dry, crumbling and overgrown with vegetation. In the 1930s the architect Attilio Rossi created the present fountain, using what remained of Bernini's cascade. Against the wall of the Grottoes of the Sibyls, he built rectangular pools with powerful water jets, the tallest jets in the center. The centerpiece was a grotto beneath the waterfall from the Fountain of the Organ; the grotto contained a 16th-century torso of a statue of Neptune, which had originally been intended for an unfinished fountain of the seas. Other jets of water in fan shapes rise from pools on the sides of the fountain.

The three fish ponds (Peschiere) cross the garden from the Fountain of Neptune. They served originally to provide fresh fish, duck, and swan for the table of the Cardinal, and also, in the plan of Pirro Ligorio, were intended to connect two fountains; the Fountain of the Organ and the cascade and the Fountain of the Seas. In the center of the ponds, Ligorio had originally planned to create a central pond with monumental fountains. However, when Ippolito died in 1572 only two of the ponds had been completed. In the late 16th century the ponds were lined by sixteen tall pilasters in the form of ermes which jetted out fan-shaped sprays of water, creating a multitude of rainbows on a sunny day.

In 1632 the Duke of Modena, in charge of the Villa, entirely remodeled the ponds. The pilasters were removed and replaced with eight pedestals with vases which spouted water, and with twenty-four large pots containing a variety of citrus trees. The ponds now serve primarily as a picturesque foreground for cascades and fountains of the Fountain of Neptune.

== The lower garden – The Rotonda of the Cypresses and the Fountain of Diana of Ephesus ==
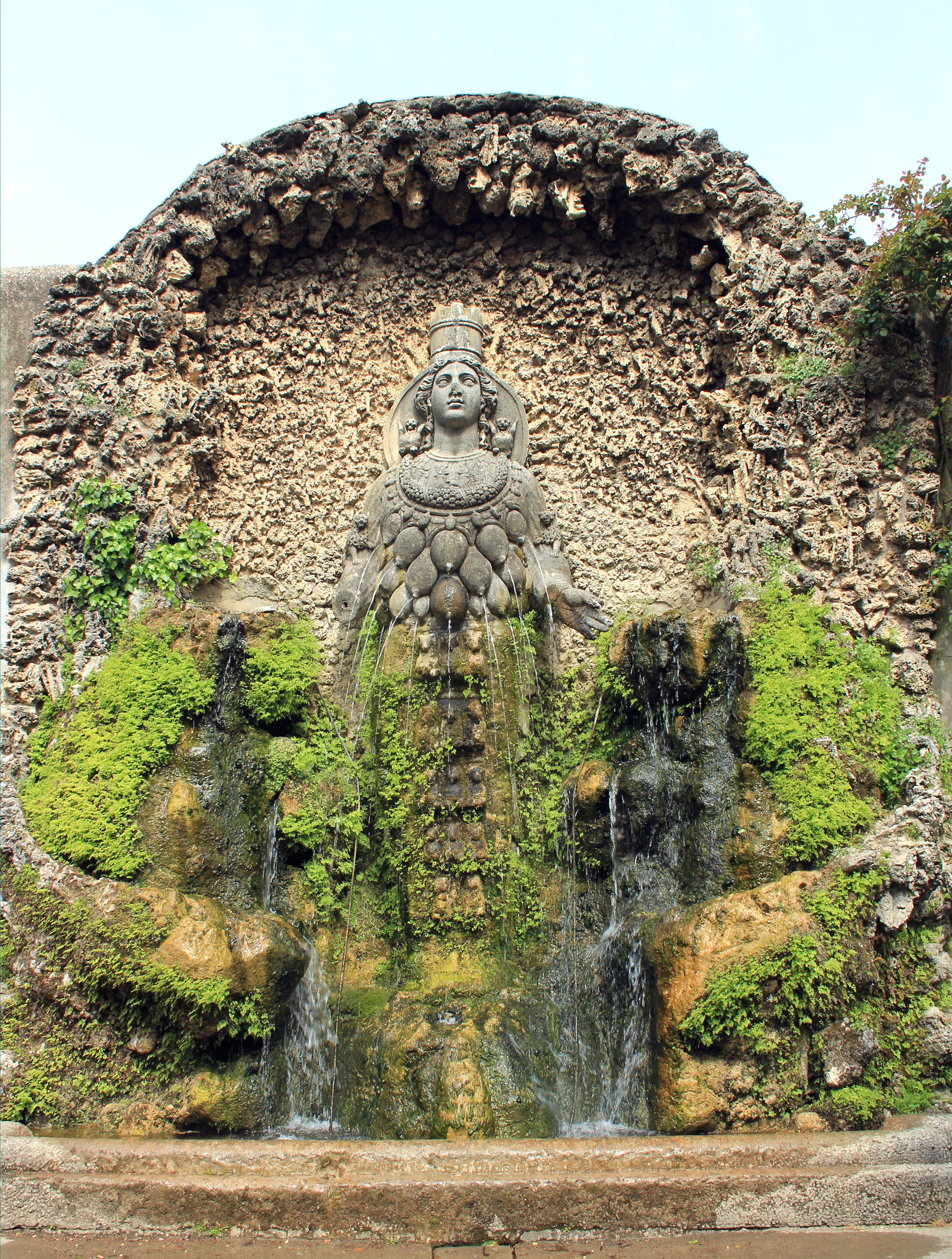
The Fountain of Diana of Ephesus

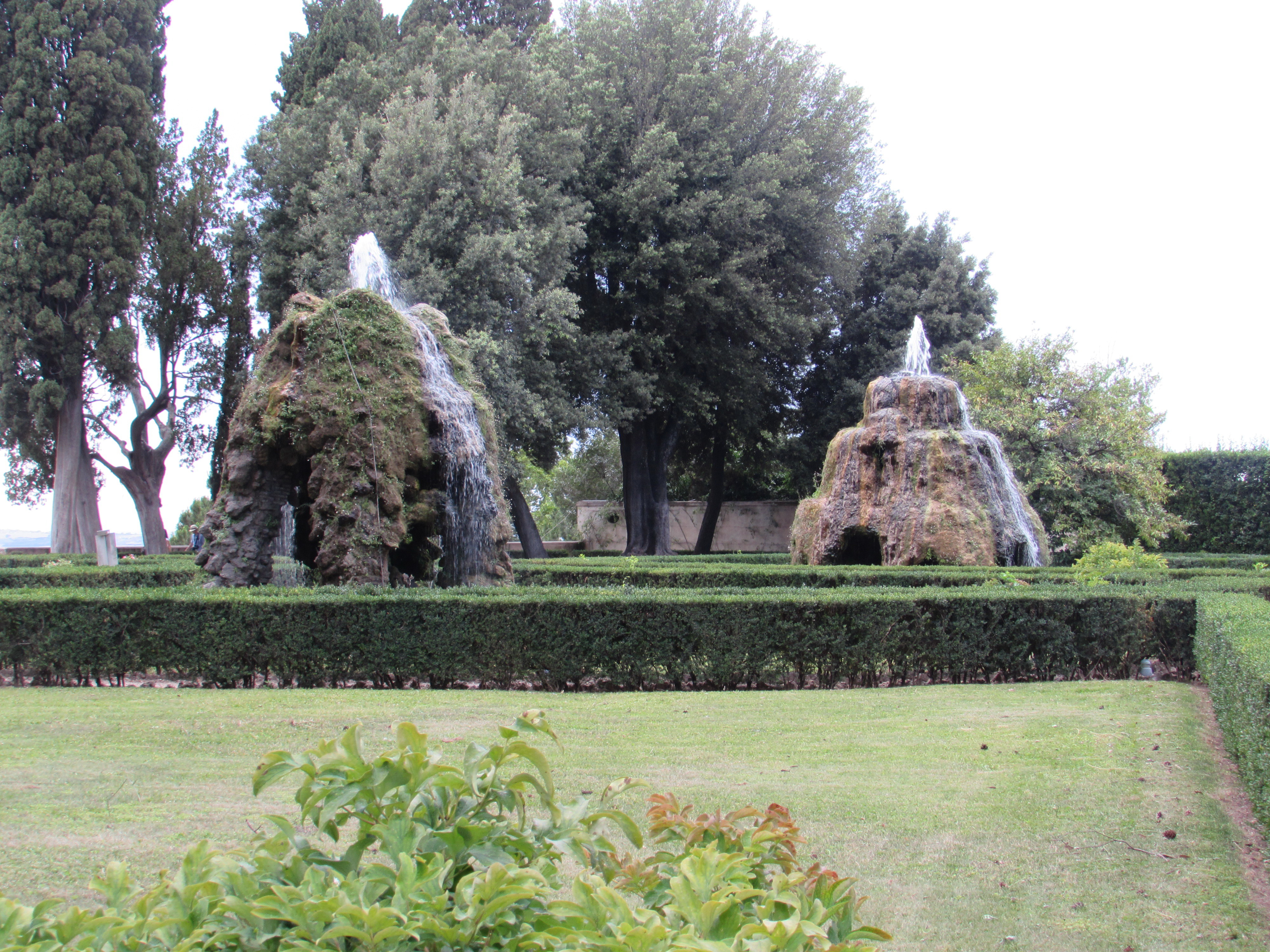
The Mette fountains in the lower garden

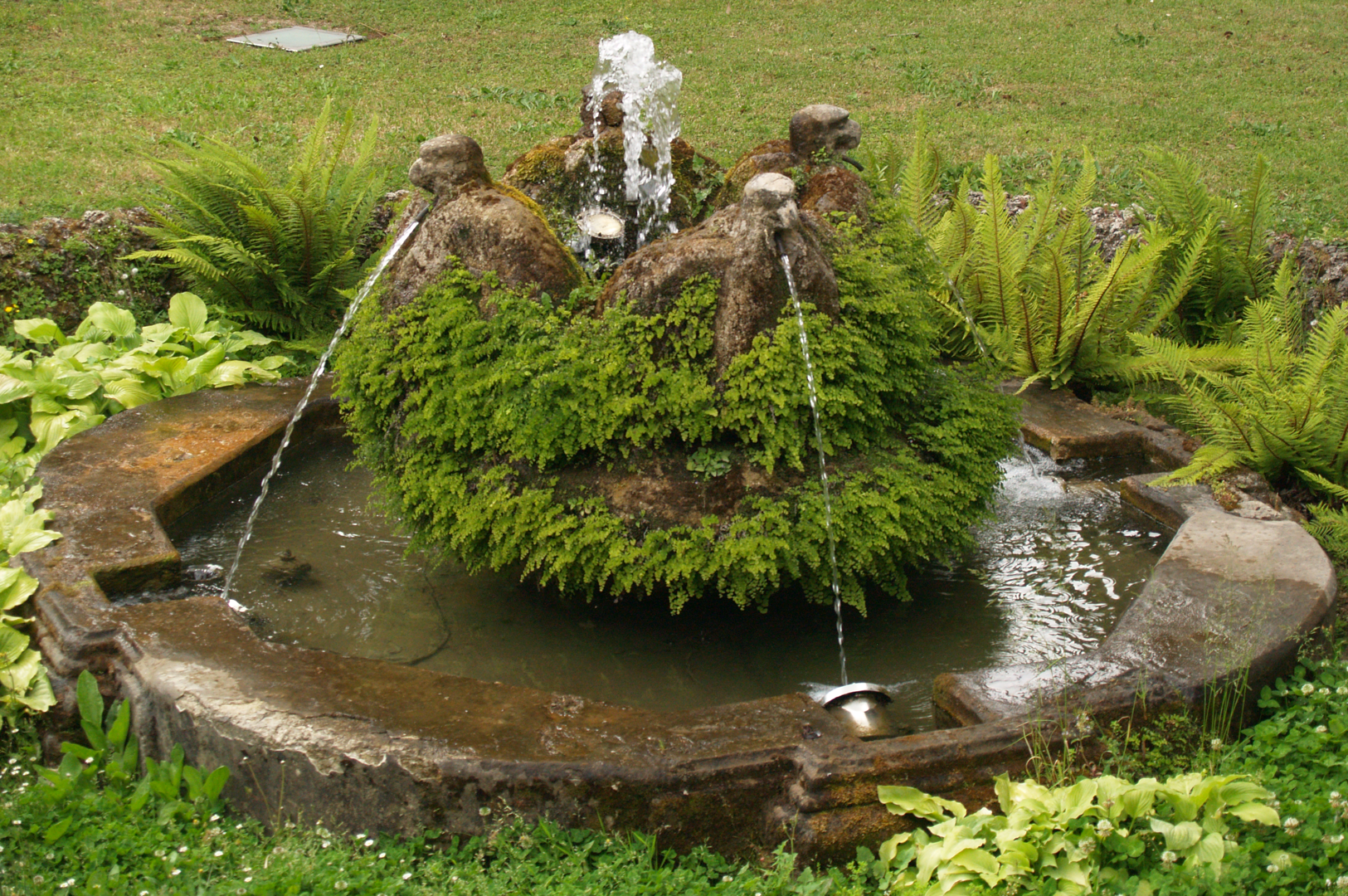
Fountain of the d'Este eagles

In the 16th century the lower garden, below the fishponds, was originally largely a kitchen garden. The center of the lower garden was divided into sixteen large squares, with a pergola in the center of each section, surrounded by beds of medicinal herbs and flowers, and large pots of fruit trees. The main paths dividing the garden were covered with trellises on which grew grapes, heather and jasmine. In the center was a large wooden pavilion, which contained four small fountains in the form of flowers, jetting water. The pergolas and pavilion were demolished in the beginning of the seventeenth century, and replaced by the Rotonda of the Cypresses, a circular alley which originally contained sixteen cypress trees, and offered shade to visitors arriving in the gardens, as well as a dramatic view of the rest of the garden, the fountains and the Villa high above. By the 19th century the cypress trees were huge, and were among the most famous features of gardens, painted by artists and inspiring music by Franz Liszt and poetry by Gabriele d'Annunzio. Two of the original cypress trees are still there; the other cypresses and laurel hedges were planted at the end of the 20th century.

The Fountains of the d'Este eagle are a group of small rustic fountains, with water spurting up from stone bowls, with a variety of themes. One contains a group of statues of the white eagle, the emblem of the d'Este family. These fountains are a vestige the formal gardens that occupied that part of the garden before the Rotonda of Cypresses was built.

The lower garden also contains two large rustic fountains, called the Mete, located on the northwest corner of the garden near the entrance. They were designed to look like natural rock, with grottos and niches. Created in 1568–69, they were made by Tommaso da Como, and were originally intended to feature two large statues of giants, the guardians of the garden. A smaller rustic fountain, called the Fontana Rustca dell'Inverno, holds a 16th-century statue of Winter that originally was in the Gran Loggia.

The most famous fountain in the lower garden is the Fountain of Diana of Ephesus, also known as the Fountain of Mother Nature. This statue originally stood next to the Fountain of the Organ; it was moved to the lower garden by Alessandro d'Este in the 16th century. It was made by the Flemish sculptor Gillis van den Vliete in 1568, and modeled after a classical Roman statue of Diana of Ephesus from the second century, now in the National Archaeological Museum, Naples. It stands in a grotto made of tartar flakes; jets of water spurt from the multiple breasts of the goddess.

== In art ==
Few gardens have been painted or drawn by as many notable artists than the Villa d'Este, particularly during the Renaissance and in the 19th century. As a result, features of the garden influenced and were imitated in other gardens across Europe, from England to Russia. In the Renaissance, the garden was seen as a showcase of classical art and new technology, but by the end of the 18th century, when the garden was overgrown and crumbling, it helped created the image of the picturesque romantic garden.

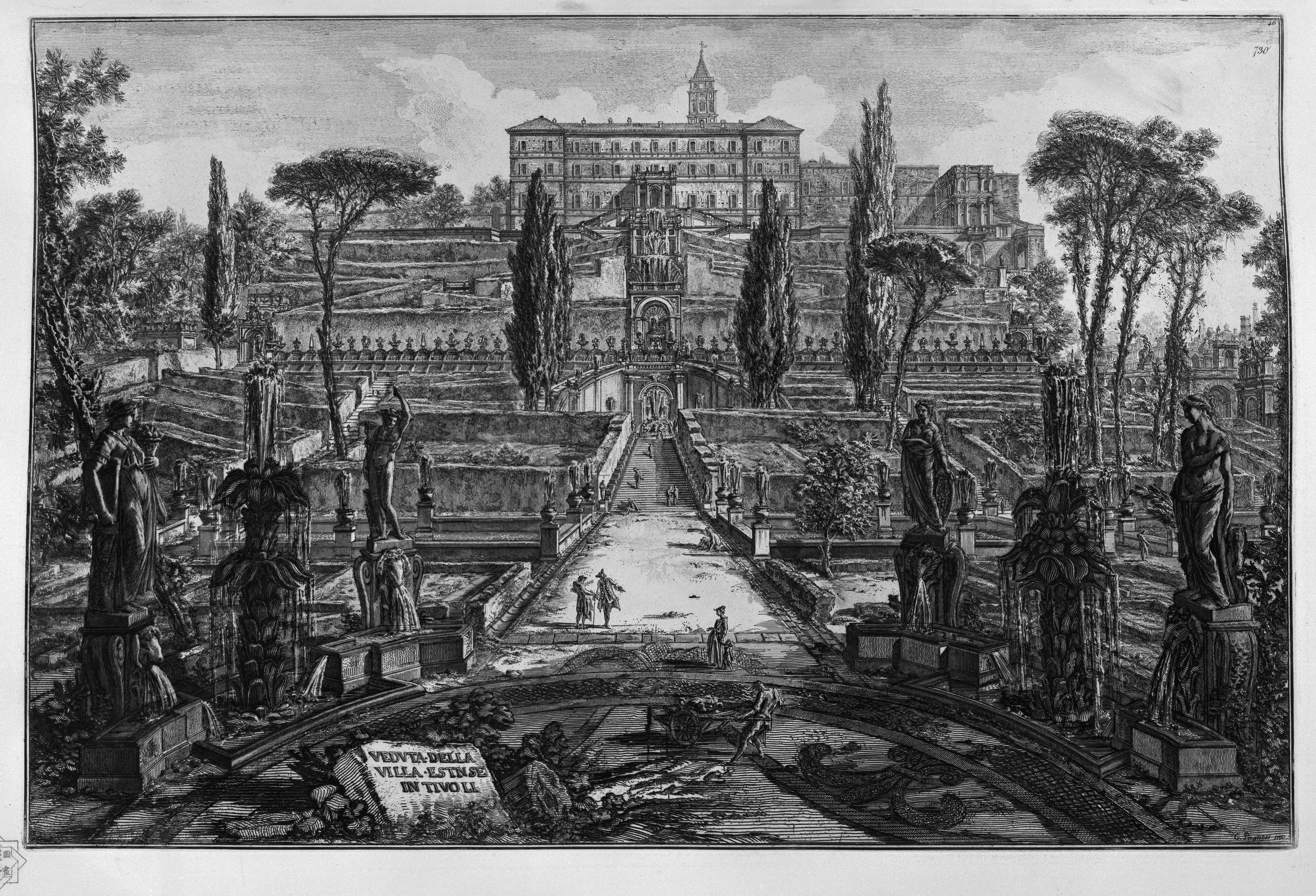
The Villa d'Este gardens by Giovanni Battista Piranesi (1761)

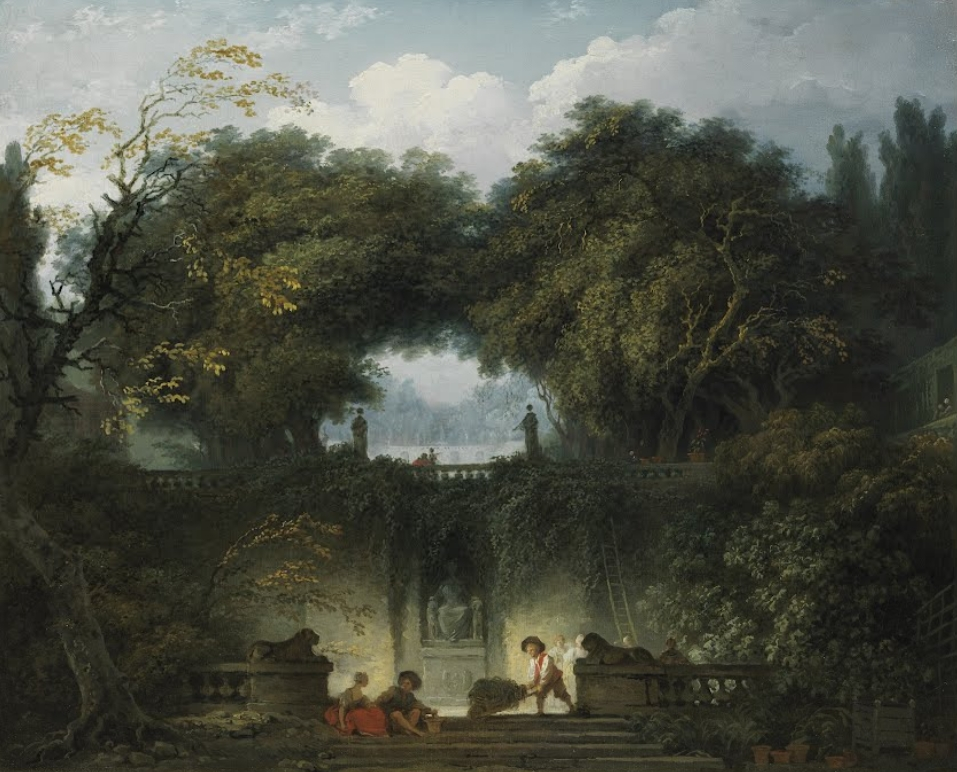
The Little Park by Jean-Honoré Fragonard (1763)

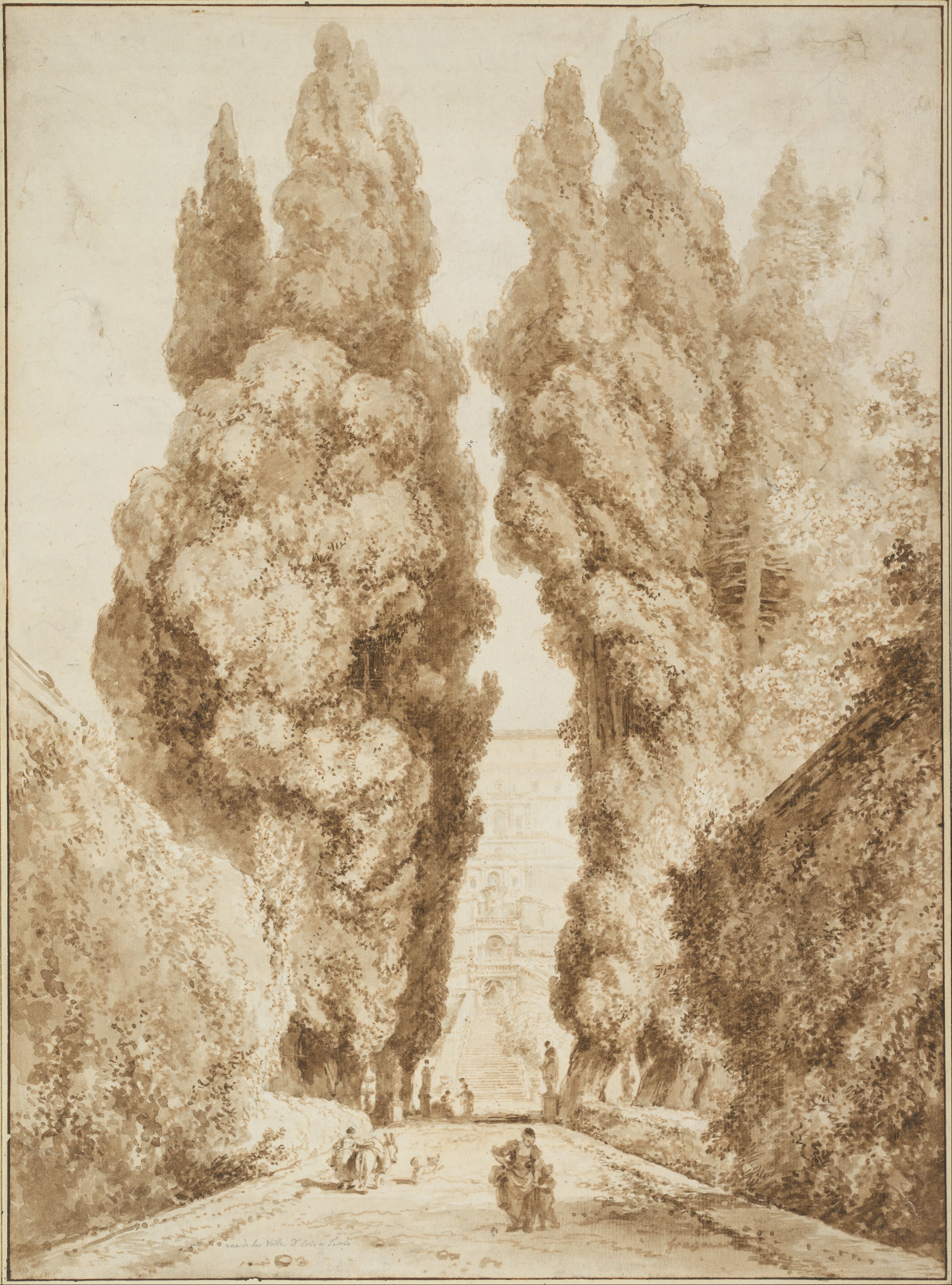
Cypress Avenue at Villa d'Este by Jean-Honoré Fragonard (1774)

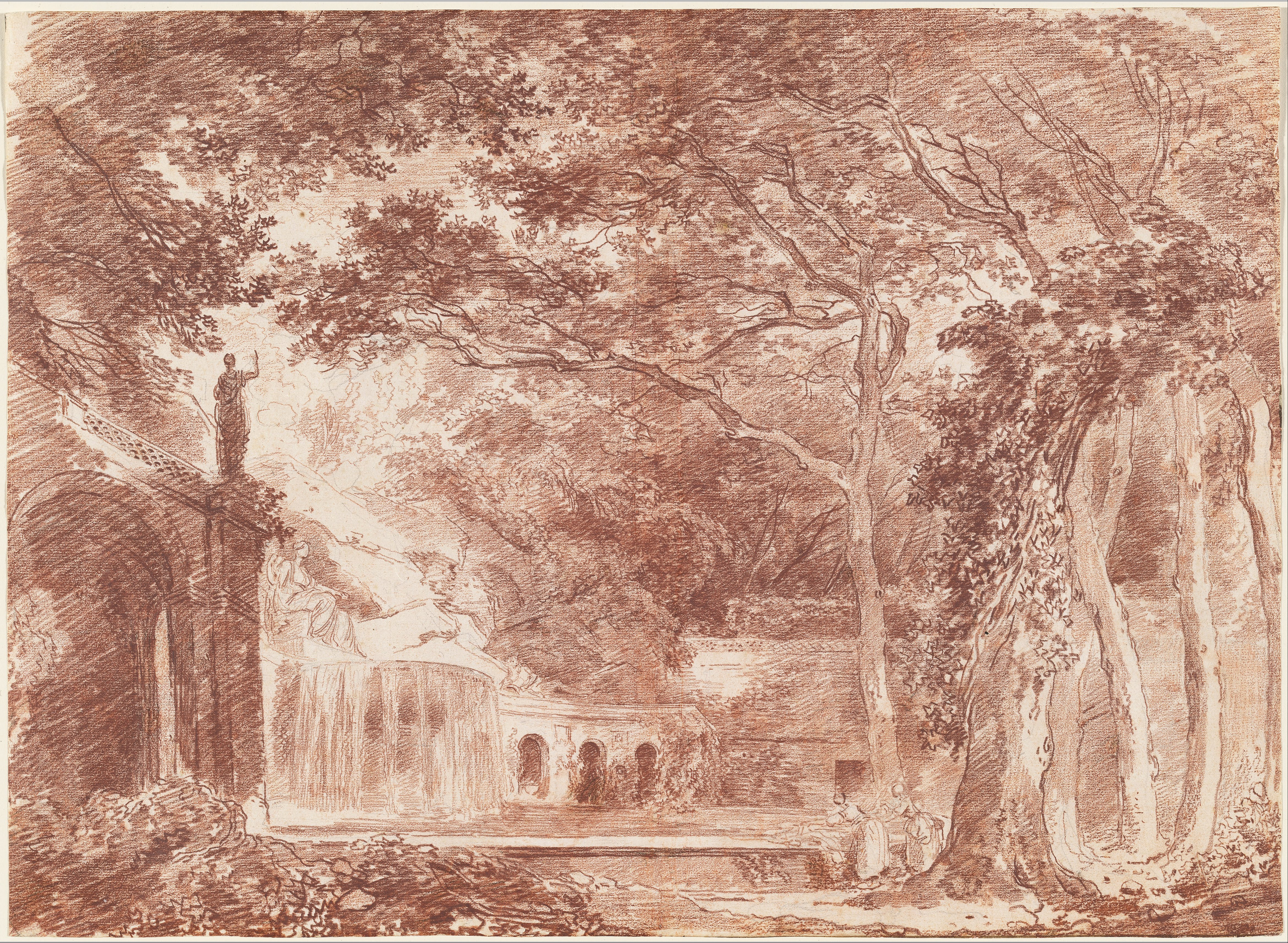
Drawing of the Oval Fountain by Hubert Robert (1733–1808)

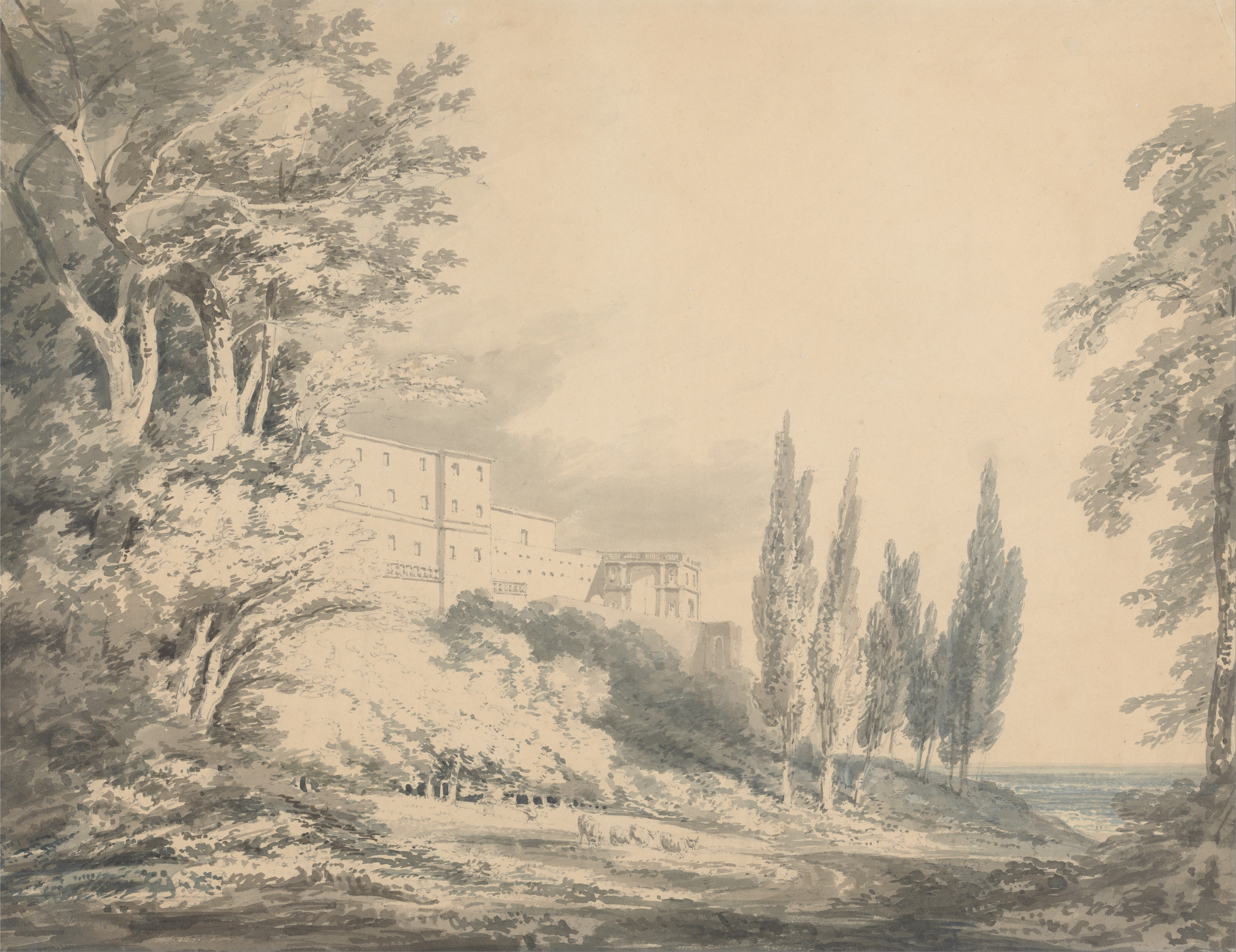
The Villa d'Este by J. M. W. Turner (about 1796)

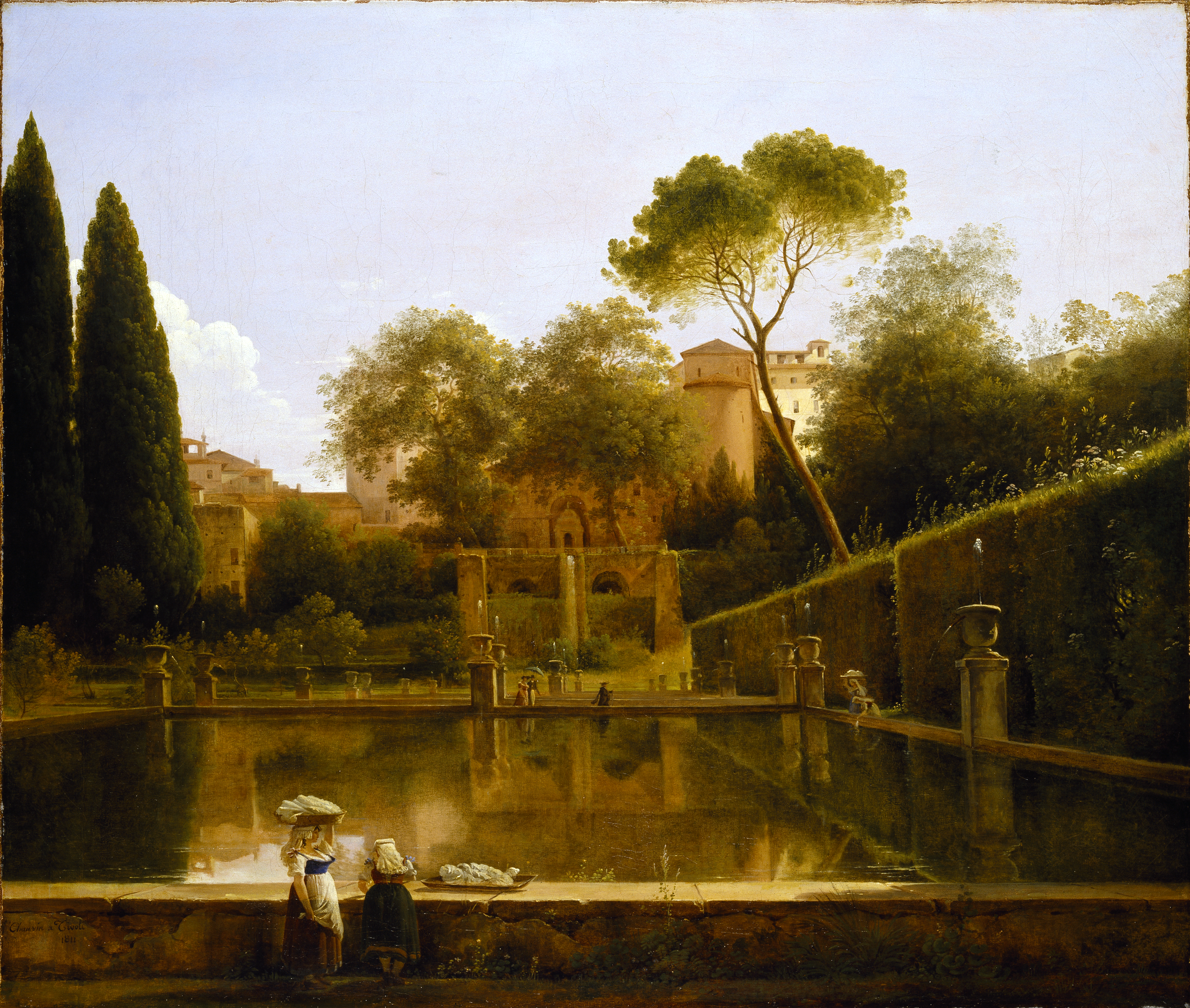
The Villa d'Este by Pierre-Athanese Chauvin (1811)

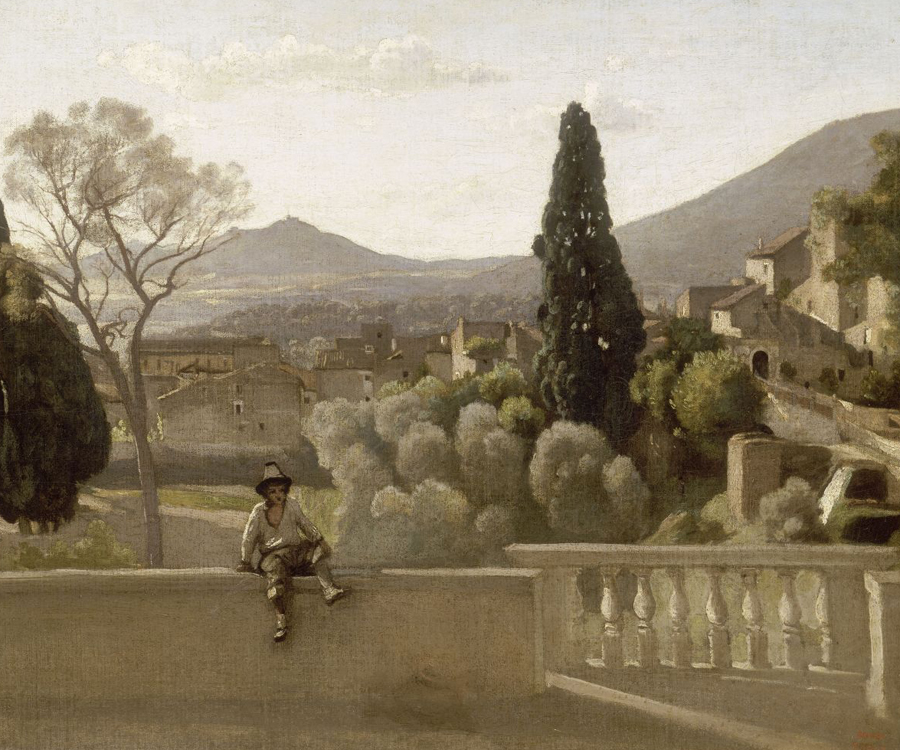
Gardens of the Villa d'Este. by Jean-Baptiste Camille Corot (1843)

The garden is the setting and filming location of Kenneth Anger's 1953 short film, Eaux d'Artifice, as well as the 1972 film The Way of the Dragon, where Bruce Lee and Nora Miao take a tour of the gardens. Filming also took place at the Villa d'Este for The Lizzie McGuire Movie (2003) and To Rome with Love.

== Visiting the Villa ==
Villa d'Este is easily reachable in the following ways:

- Taking the blue regional Cotral bus Roma Tivoli-Via Prenestina at the bus terminal just outside Ponte Mammolo station of metro line B; the stop Largo Nazioni Unite is about 100 m from the entrance of the Villa
- Taking the urban train line FL2 from Tiburtina station to Tivoli station, then, local bus CAT number 1 or 4/ to Piazza Garibaldi stop; the stop is in Tivoli's main square in front of the Villa

== See also ==
- Hadrian's Villa
- History of gardening
- Italian Renaissance garden
- Landscape architecture
- Tiburtine Sibyl

== Bibliography ==
- Attlee, Helena (2006). Italian Gardens - A Cultural History (paperback). London: Frances Lincoln. p. 240. ISBN 978-0-7112-3392-8.
- Barisi, Isabella (2004). Guide to Villa d'Este. Rome: De Luca Editori d'Arte. ISBN 978-88-8016-613-9.
- Impelluso, Lucia. Jardins, potagers et labyrinthes, Editions Hazan, Paris, 2007
- Allain, Yves-Marie and Christiany, Janine L'art des jardins en Europe, Citadelles and Mazenod, Paris, 2006
