= Giovanni di Lapo Ghini =

Italian architect

Giovanni di Lapo Ghini was a 14th-century Italian architect working in Florence. He was one of the architects who contributed to the completion of the basilica of Saint Maria of Fiore in the city. His contribution to the cathedral followed the death of the architect Giotto in 1337, and the subsequent dismissal of Francesco Talenti in 1364. However Lapo Ghini was not responsible for the dome which was begun about 1420 by Brunelleschi.
