= Thesaurus florentinus =

Thesaurus Florentinus is a project for the acquisition and reconstruction of the images of the mural paintings in the Cupola of Santa Maria del Fiore in Florence and a computer system to manage the hundreds of thousand pieces of information gathered during the restoration campaign ended in 1995. The project was conceived by Arch. Riccardo Dalla Negra and realised by Lapo Bertini, Silvia Brotini, Auro Pampaloni, Marco Menichetti, Lara Calosi and Arianna Sacchetti with the technological support of IBM and Eastman Kodak and the financial support of the Ministero dei Beni Culturali of Italy and Ente Cassa di Risparmio di Firenze. The project started in 1992 and ended in 2000.
