= Florence Cathedral =

Church in Tuscany, Italy

- Cathedral of Saint Mary of the Flower
- Cattedrale di Santa Maria del Fiore Duomo di Firenze (Italian); Cathedralis Sanctae Mariae Floris (Latin)
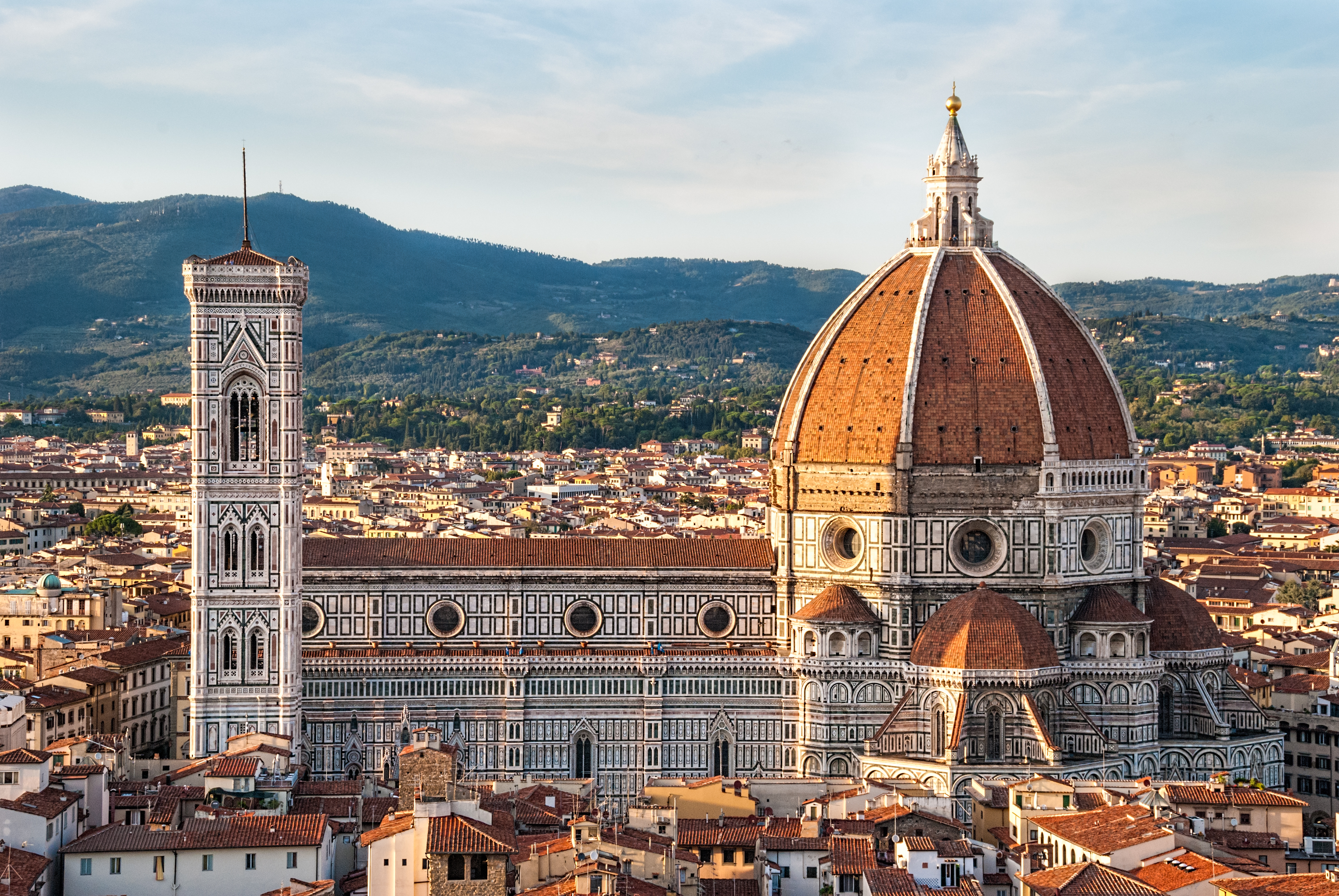

- Location in Florence, Italy, Europe
- 43°46′23″N 11°15′25″E
- Location: Florence, Tuscany
- Country: Italy
- Denomination: Catholic Church
- Tradition: Latin Church
- Website: Duomo Firenze

History
- Status: Cathedral, minor basilica
- Consecrated: 1436

Architecture
- Architects: Arnolfo di Cambio; Filippo Brunelleschi; Emilio De Fabris
- Architectural type: Basilica
- Style: Romanesque, Gothic, Renaissance
- Groundbreaking: 9 September 1296
- Completed: 1436 (except 19th century façade)

Specifications
- Length: 153 m (502 ft)
- Width: 90 m (300 ft)
- Height: 114.5 m (376 ft)
- Materials: Brick, marble

Administration
- Archdiocese: Archdiocese of Florence

Clergy
- Archbishop: Gherardo Gambelli

UNESCO World Heritage Site
- Type: Cultural
- Criteria: i, ii, iii, iv, vi
- Designated: 1982 (6th session)
- Part of: Historic Centre of Florence
- Reference no.: 174
- Region: Europe and North America

Florence Cathedral (Italian: Duomo di Firenze), formally the Cathedral of Saint Mary of the Flower (Italian: Cattedrale di Santa Maria del Fiore [katteˈdraːle di ˈsanta maˈriːa del ˈfjoːre]), is the cathedral of the Catholic Archdiocese of Florence in Florence, Italy. Commenced in 1296 in the Gothic style to a design of Arnolfo di Cambio and completed by 1436 with a dome engineered by Filippo Brunelleschi, the basilica's exterior is faced with polychrome marble panels in various shades of green and pink, alternated by white, and features an elaborate 19th-century Gothic Revival western façade by Emilio De Fabris.

The cathedral complex, in Piazza del Duomo, includes the Florence Baptistery and Giotto's Campanile. These three buildings are part of the UNESCO World Heritage Site covering the historic centre of Florence and are a major tourist attraction of Tuscany. The basilica is one of world's largest churches and its dome is still the largest masonry dome ever constructed. The cathedral is the mother church and seat of the Archdiocese of Florence, whose archbishop is Gherardo Gambelli.

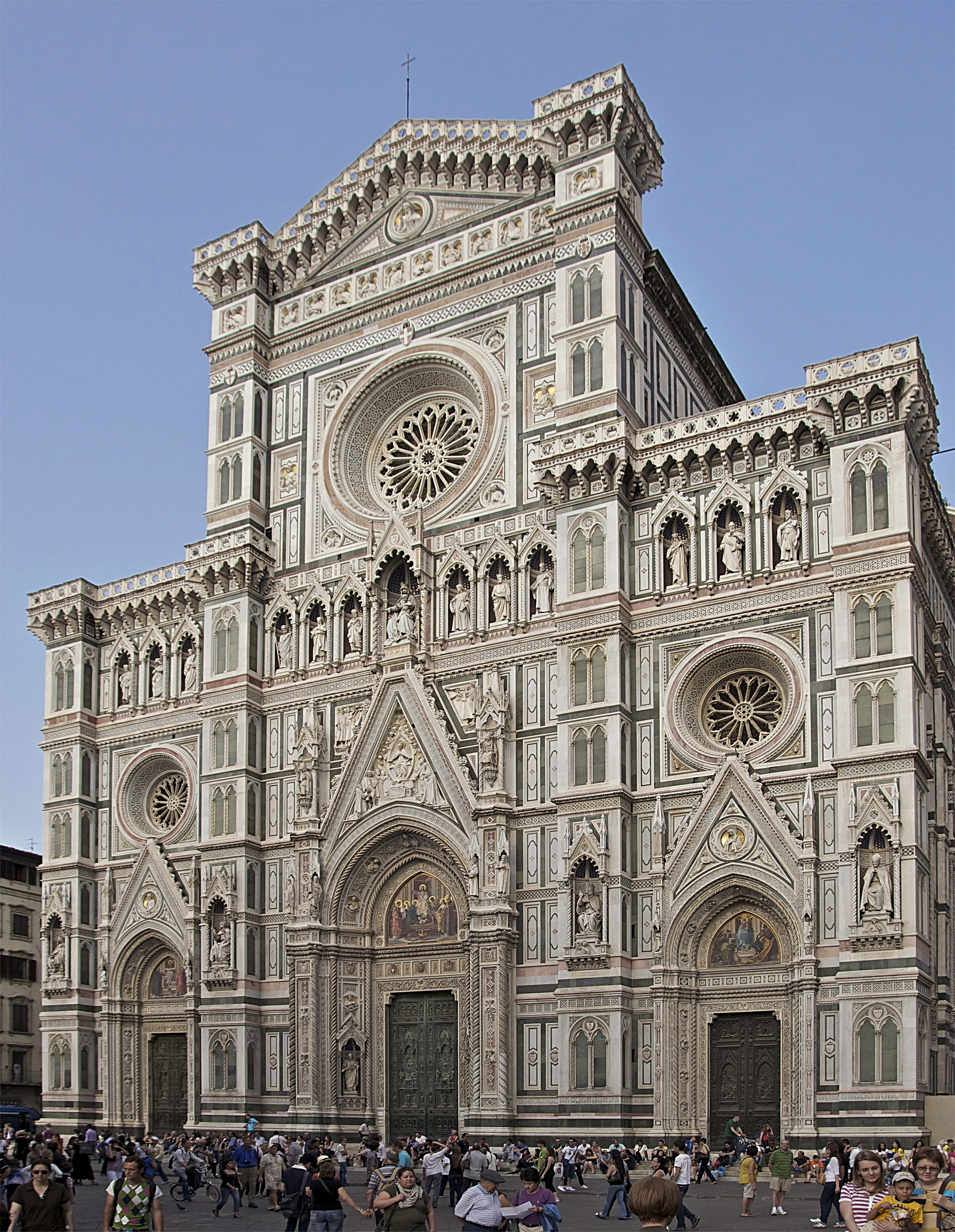
The 19th century Neo-Gothic façade

== History ==
Santa Maria del Fiore was built on the site of Florence's second cathedral dedicated to Saint Reparata; the first bishop's seat was the Basilica of San Lorenzo, the initial building of which was consecrated as a church in 393 by St. Ambrose of Milan. The ancient structure, founded in the early 5th century and having undergone many repairs, was crumbling with age, according to the 14th-century Nuova Cronica of Giovanni Villani, and was no longer large enough to serve the growing population of the city. Other major Tuscan cities had undertaken ambitious reconstructions of their cathedrals during the Late Medieval period, such as Pisa and particularly Siena where enormous proposed extensions were never completed.

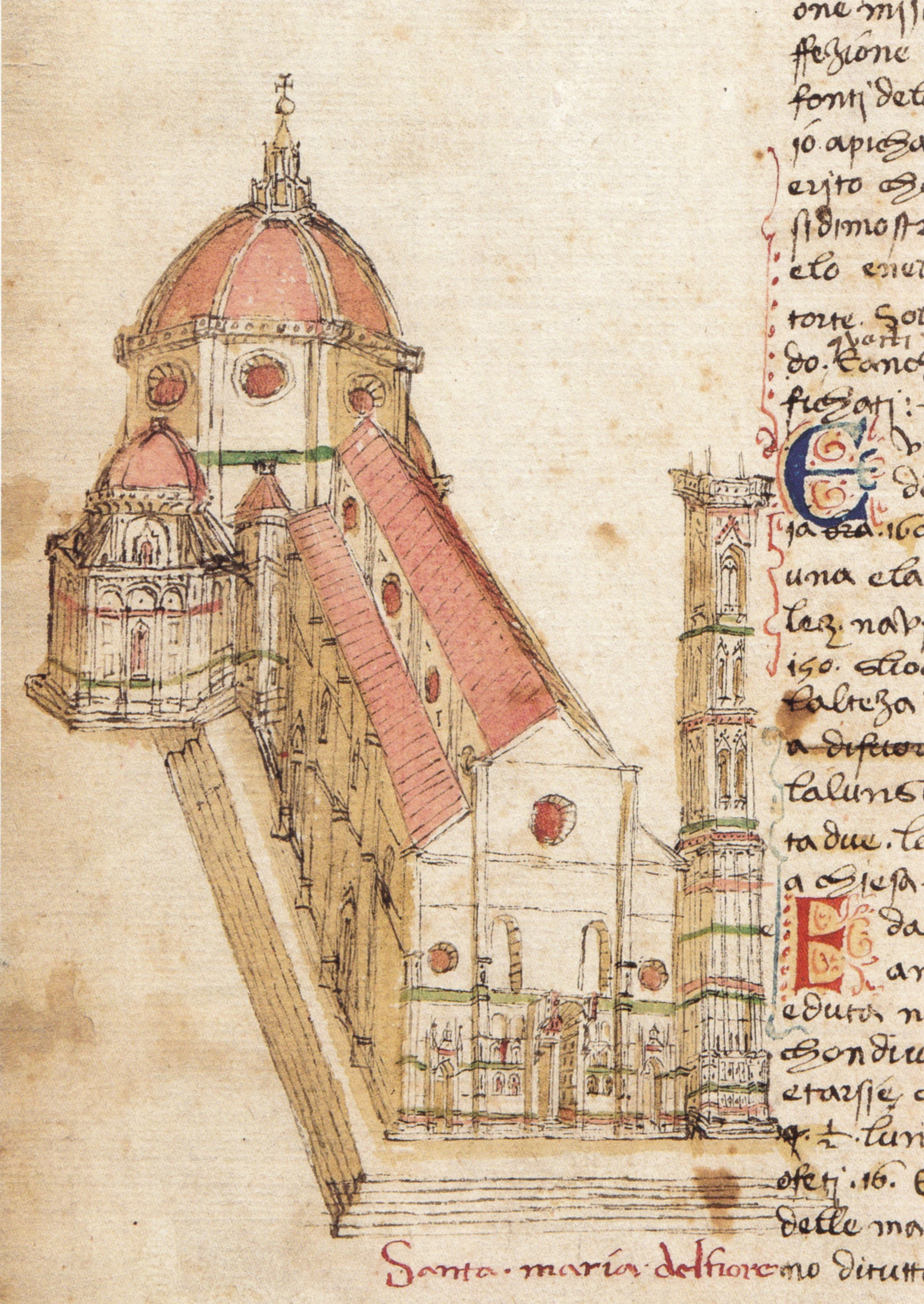
The Cathedral as depicted in the Codex Rustici of 1447

The city council of Florence approved Arnolfo di Cambio's design for the new church in 1294. Di Cambio was also architect of the church of Santa Croce and the Palazzo Vecchio. He designed three wide naves ending under an octagonal dome, with the middle nave covering the area of Santa Reparata. The first stone was laid on 9 September 1296, by Cardinal Valeriana, the first papal legate ever sent to Florence. The building of this vast project was to last 140 years; Arnolfo's plan for the eastern end, although maintained in concept, was greatly expanded in size.

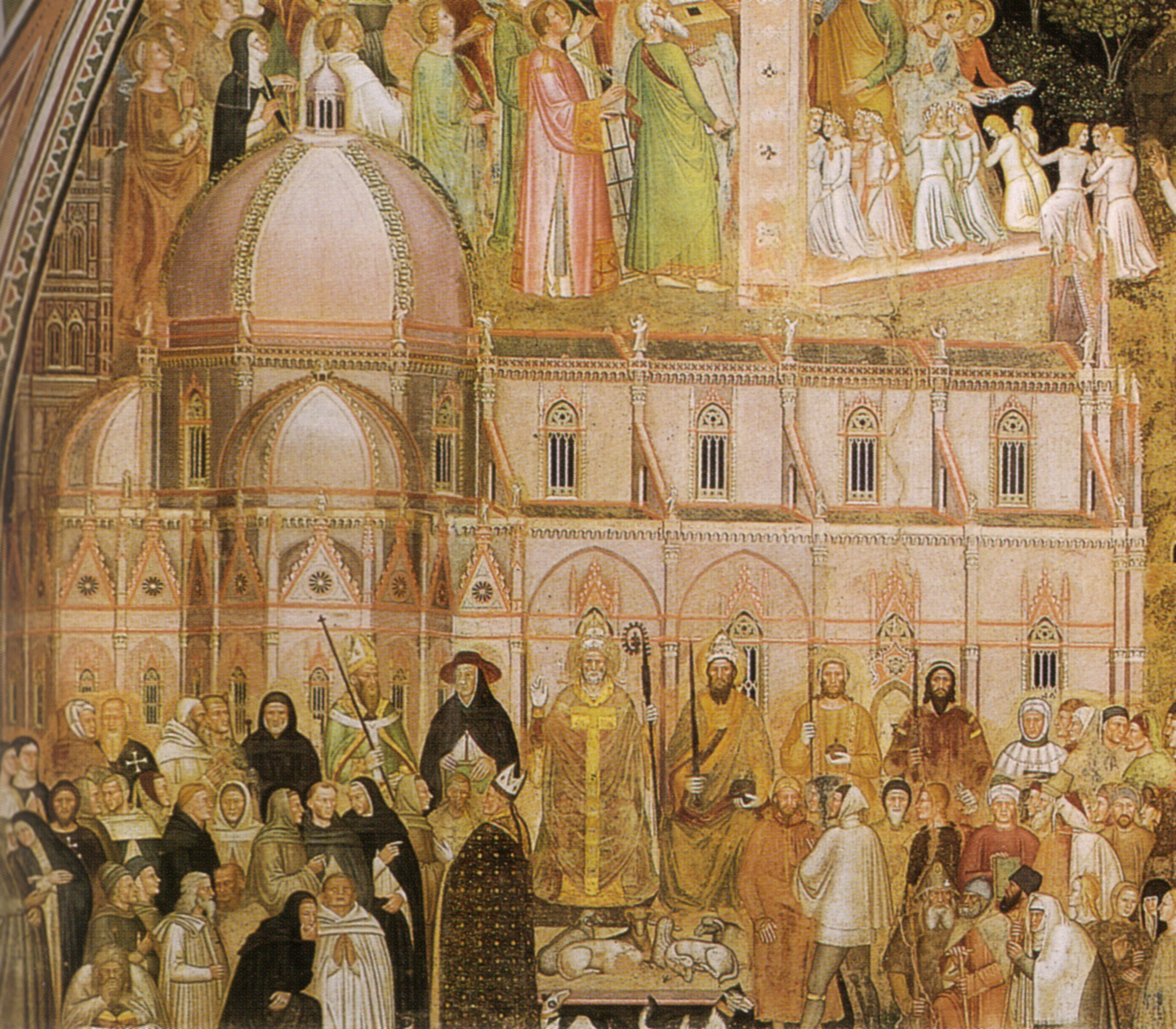
The Duomo, as if completed, in a fresco by Andrea di Bonaiuto, painted in the 1360s, before the commencement of the dome

After Arnolfo died in 1302, building of the cathedral slowed for almost 50 years. When the relics of Saint Zenobius were discovered in 1330 in Santa Reparata, the project gained a new impetus. In 1331, the Arte della Lana, the guild of wool merchants, took over patronage for the construction of the cathedral and in 1334 appointed Giotto to oversee the work. Assisted by Andrea Pisano, Giotto continued di Cambio's design. His major contribution was to design and begin the construction of the campanile. When Giotto died on 8 January 1337, Andrea Pisano continued the building until work was halted due to the Black Death in 1348.

In 1349, action resumed on the cathedral under a series of architects, starting with Francesco Talenti, who finished the campanile and enlarged the overall project to include the apse and the side chapels. In 1359, Talenti was succeeded by Giovanni di Lapo Ghini (1360–1369) who divided the centre nave into four square bays. Other architects were Alberto Arnoldi, Giovanni d'Ambrogio, Neri di Fioravanti and Andrea Orcagna. By 1375, the old church of Santa Reparata was pulled down. The nave was finished by 1380, and only the dome remained incomplete until 1436.

On 19 August 1418, the Arte della Lana announced an architectural design competition for erecting Neri's dome. The two main competitors were two master goldsmiths, Lorenzo Ghiberti and Filippo Brunelleschi, the latter of whom was supported by Cosimo de' Medici. Ghiberti had been the winner of a competition for a pair of bronze doors for the Baptistery in 1401 and lifelong competition between the two seem to remain. Brunelleschi won and received the commission.

Ghiberti, appointed coadjutor, drew a salary equal to Brunelleschi's and, though neither was awarded the announced prize of 200 florins, was promised equal credit, although he spent most of his time on other projects. When Brunelleschi became ill, or feigned illness, the project was briefly in the hands of Ghiberti, but soon he supposedly had to admit that the whole project was beyond him. In 1423, Brunelleschi was back in charge and took over sole responsibility.

Erection of the dome had begun in 1420 and was finished in 1436. The cathedral was consecrated by Pope Eugene IV on 25 March 1436, the first day of the year according to the Florentine calendar. It was the first 'octagonal dome in history to be built without a temporary wooden supporting frame. During the consecration in 1436, Guillaume Dufay's motet Nuper rosarum flores was performed.

The decoration of the exterior of the cathedral, begun in the 14th century, was left unfinished after the initial works done by Arnolfo di Cambio, which led Lorenzo de' Medici to initiate a design competition for the façade between 1490 and 1491. The competition went ultimately nowhere, and the façade wasn't installed until the 19th century, in 1887, with the fabrication of Emilio De Fabris' polychrome marble design. The floor of the church had been relaid in marble tiles in the 16th century.

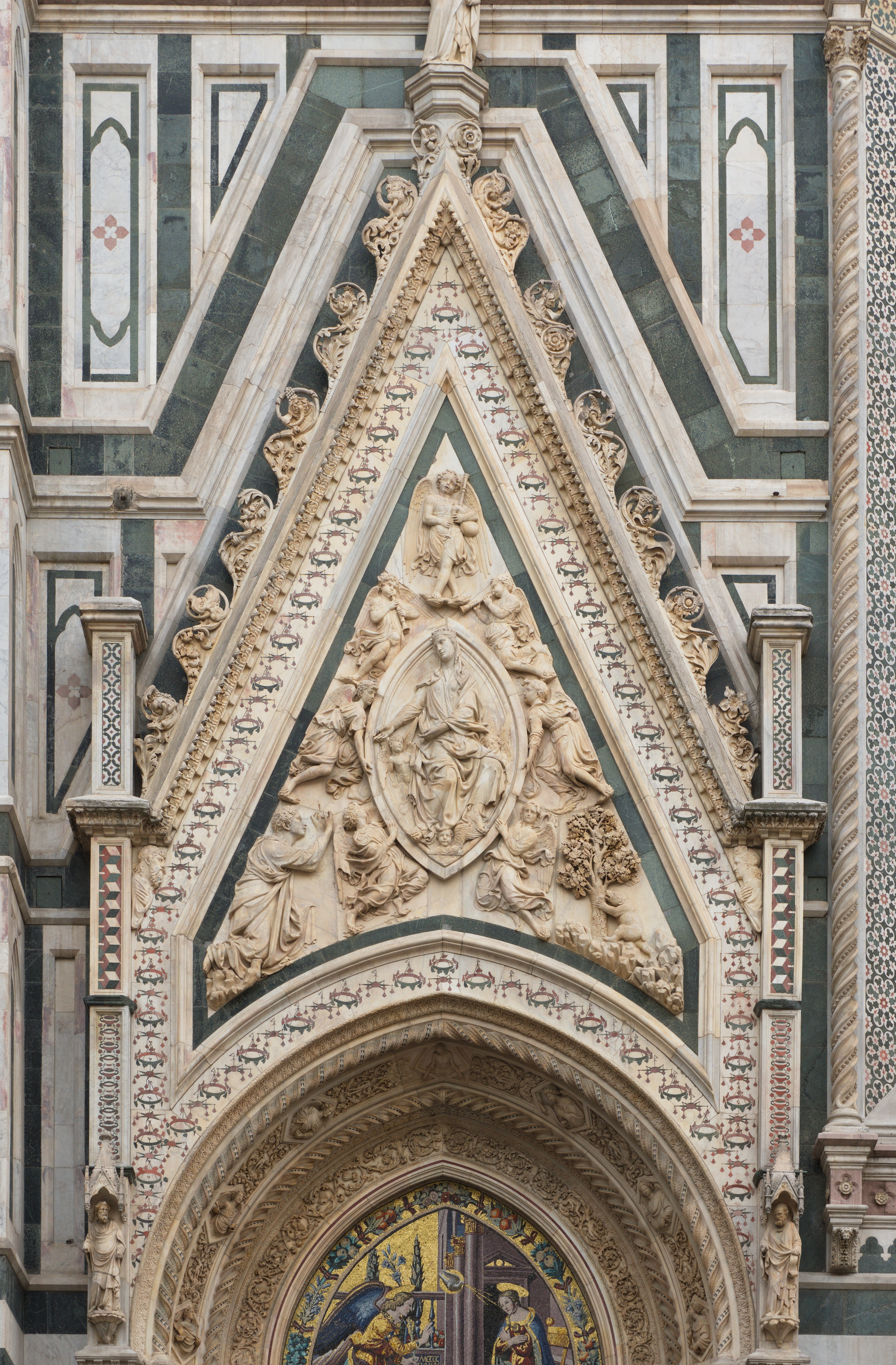
The Madonna of the Girdle of the Porta della Mandorla, by Nanni di Banco, 1414–21

The exterior walls are faced in alternate vertical and horizontal bands of polychrome marble from Carrara (white), Prato (green), Siena (red), Lavenza and a few other places. De Fabris had to copy the initially Romanesque cladding style peculiar to Tuscan church architecture such as the earlier baptistery (Battistero di San Giovanni), and Giotto's bell tower. There are two major side doors near the crossing: the Porta dei Canonici on the south side and the Porta di Mandorla to the north. The mandorla with the Madonna of the Girdle surrounded by angels was sculpted by Nanni di Banco. Nanni who worked with his father and others on the door, died way too early before the portal was completed. Nanni and the befriended young Donatello provided two youthful prophet figures for the top of the pinnacles flanking the portal which are now in the Museo dell'Opera del Duomo. The six side windows, notable for their delicate tracery and ornaments, are separated by pilasters. Only the four windows closest to the transept admit light; the other two are merely ornamental. The clerestory windows are round, a common Italian Gothic feature.

== Exterior ==
=== Plan and structure ===
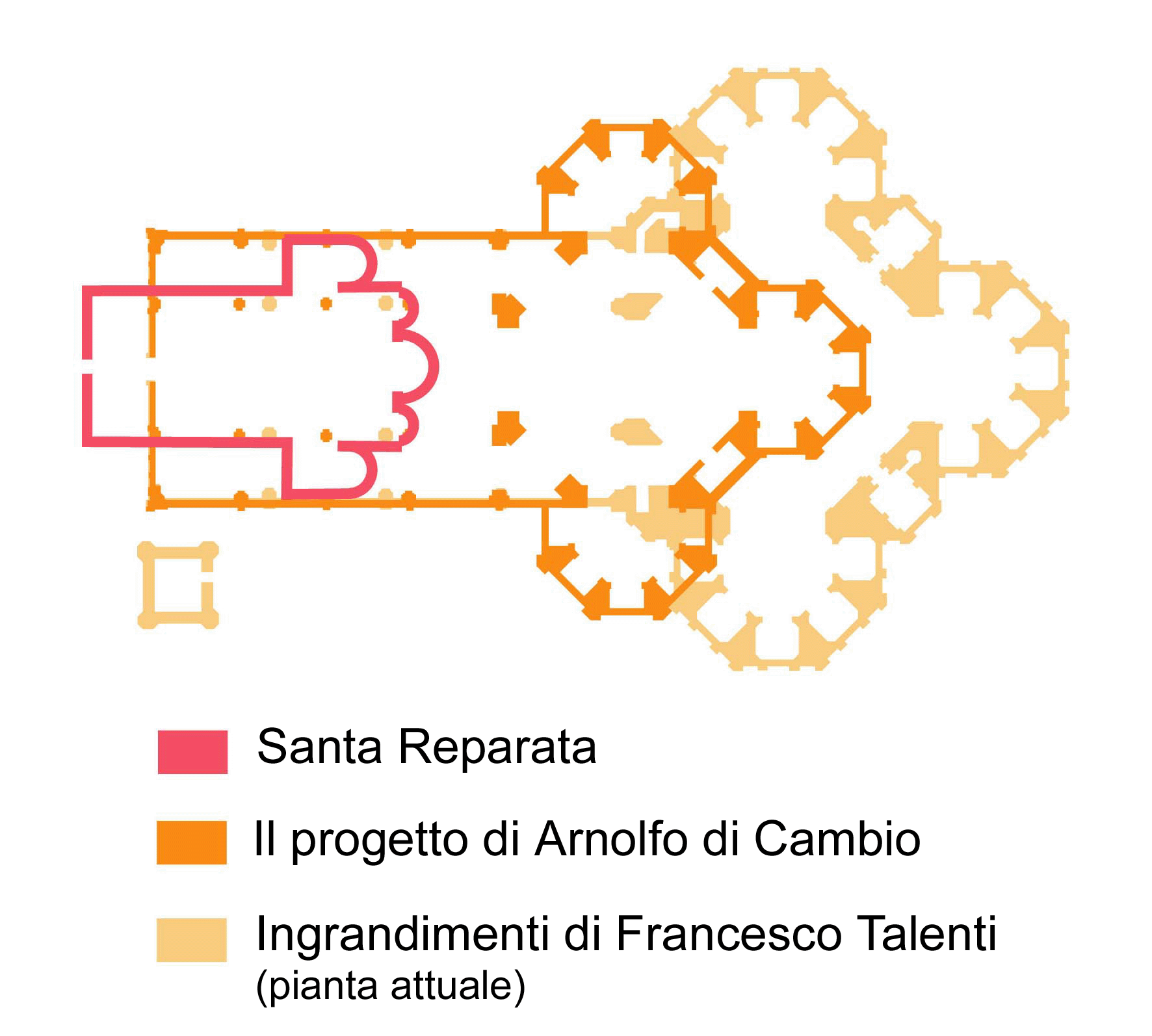
Plan of the church with various extension phases

The cathedral of Florence is built as a basilica, having a wide central nave of four square bays, with an aisle on either side. The chancel and transepts are of identical polygonal plan, separated by two smaller polygonal chapels. The whole plan forms a Latin cross. The nave and aisles are separated by wide pointed Gothic arches resting on composite piers.

Its arrangement of trilobate -three lobe- apses was intended to evoke the form of a flower, as a homage to Fiorenza, the "city of flowers".

The dimensions of the building are enormous: building area 8,300 m^{2} (89,340 sq ft), length 153 m (502 ft), width 38 m (125 ft), width at the crossing 90 m (300 ft). The height of the arches in the aisles is 23 m (75 ft). The height of the dome is 114.5 m (375.7 ft). It has the fifth tallest dome in the world.

=== Planned sculpture for the exterior ===
The Overseers of the Office of Works of Florence Cathedral, the Arte della Lana, had plans to commission a series of twelve large Old Testament sculptures for the buttresses of the cathedral. Donatello, then in his early twenties, was commissioned to carve a statue of David in 1408, to top one of the buttresses, though it was never placed there. Nanni di Banco was commissioned to carve a marble statue of Isaiah, at the same scale, in the same year. One of the statues was lifted into place in 1409, but was found to be too small to be easily visible from the ground and was taken down; both statues then languished in the workshop of the opera for several years. In 1409–1411 Donatello made a statue of a sitting Saint John the Evangelist which until 1588 was in a niche of the old cathedral façade. Between 1415 and 1426, Donatello created five statues for the campanile of Santa Maria del Fiore. These are the Beardless and the Bearded Prophet (both from 1415); the Sacrifice of Isaac (1421); Habbakuk (1423–25); and Jeremiah (1423–26); which follow the classical models for orators and are characterised by strong portrait details. A figure of Hercules, in terracotta, was commissioned from the Florentine sculptor Agostino di Duccio in 1463 and was made perhaps under Donatello's direction. A statue of David by Michelangelo was completed 1501–1504 although it could not be placed on the buttress because of its six-ton weight. In 2010 a fiberglass replica of "David" was placed for one day on a roof-top buttress for a chapel's dome.

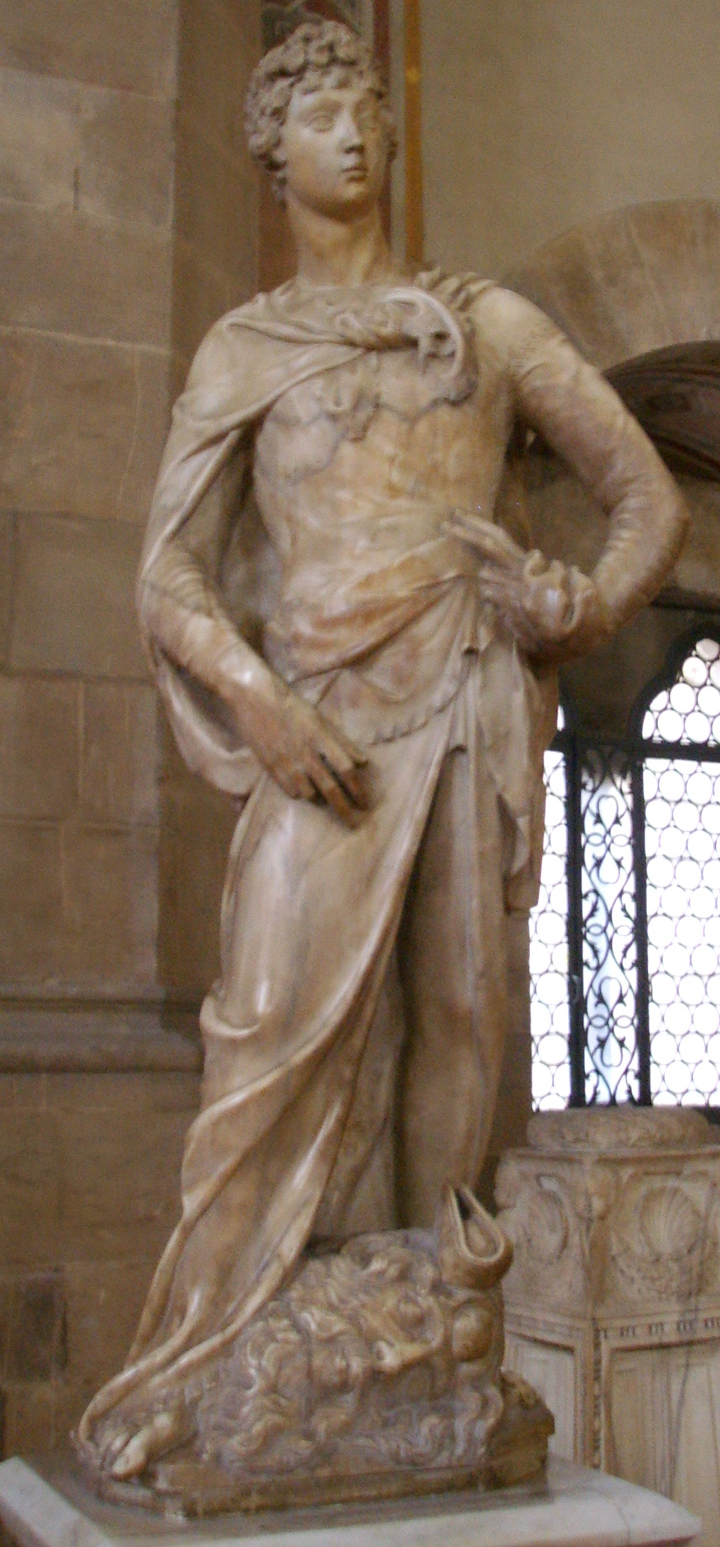
Donatello first version of David (1408–09). Museo Nazionale del Bargello, Florence. Height 191 cm.

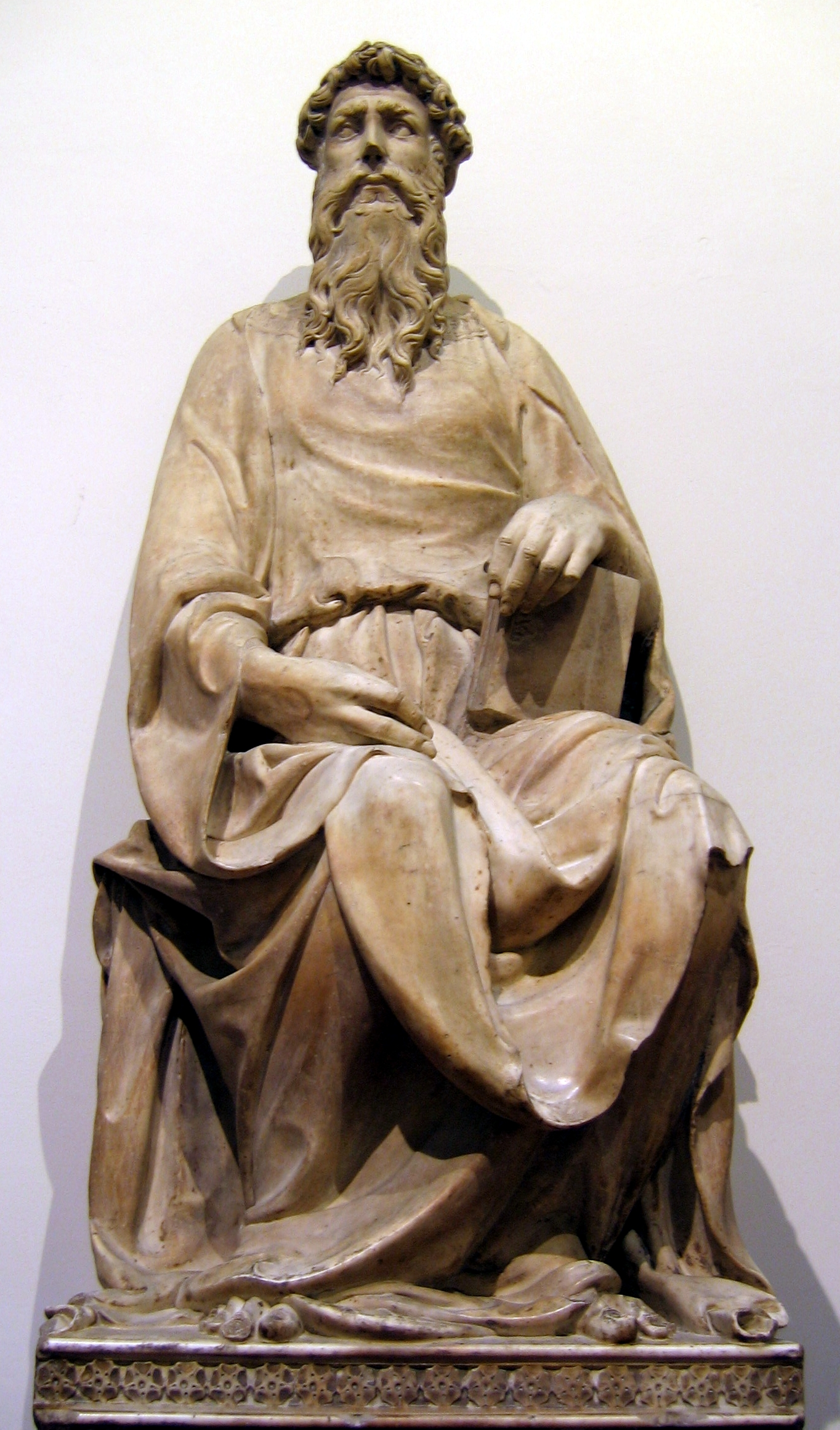
Donatello's colossal seated figure of Saint John the Evangelist; 1409–11

A fiberglass replica of Michaelangelo's David statue [seen from the north]. This was the original placement planned for the statue.

=== Dome ===
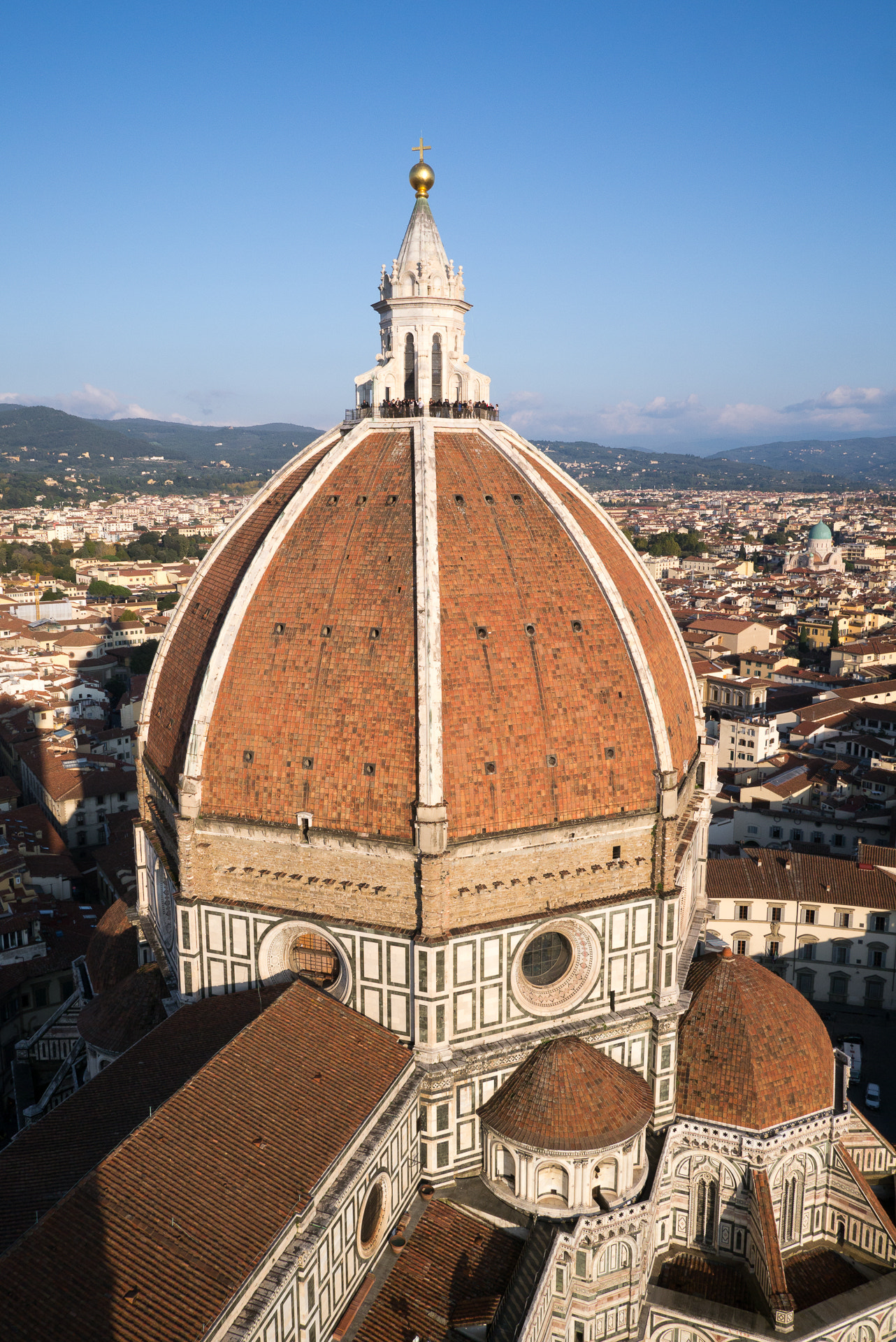
Close view of the dome

After a hundred years of construction and by the beginning of the 15th century, the structure was still missing its dome. The basic features of the dome had been designed by Arnolfo di Cambio in 1296. His brick model, 4.6 m (15.1 ft) high, 9.2 m (30.2 ft) long, was standing in a side aisle of the unfinished building, and had long been sacrosanct. It called for an octagonal dome higher and wider than any that had ever been built, with no external buttresses to keep it from spreading and falling under its own weight.

The commitment to reject traditional Gothic buttresses had been made when Neri di Fioravanti's model was chosen over a competing one by Giovanni di Lapo Ghini. That architectural choice, in 1367, was one of the first events of the Italian Renaissance, marking a break with the Medieval Gothic style and a return to the classic Mediterranean dome. Italian architects regarded Gothic flying buttresses as ugly makeshifts. Furthermore, the use of buttresses was forbidden in Florence, as the style was favored by central Italy's traditional enemies to the north. Neri's model depicted a massive inner dome, open at the top to admit light, like Rome's Pantheon, partly supported by the inner dome, but enclosed in a thinner outer shell, to keep out the weather. It was to stand on an unbuttressed octagonal drum. Neri's dome would need an internal defense against spreading (hoop stress), but none had yet been designed.

The building of such a masonry dome posed many technical problems. Brunelleschi looked to the great dome of the Pantheon in Rome for solutions. The dome of the Pantheon is a single shell of concrete, the formula for which had long since been forgotten. The Pantheon had employed structural centring to support the concrete dome while it cured. This could not be the solution in the case of a dome this size and would put the church out of use. For the height and breadth of the dome designed by Neri, starting 52 m (171 ft) above the floor and spanning 44 m (144 ft), there was not enough timber in Tuscany to build the scaffolding and forms. Brunelleschi chose to follow such a design and employed a double shell, a form of construction with earlier precedents in Persian and Central Asian architecture. Both shells were built of brick, chosen for its light weight compared to stone and the ease of forming it in place, and raised with nothing supporting them from below during construction. Sandstone and marble were reserved for the tension chains, the ribs and the lantern. To illustrate his proposed structural plan, he constructed a wooden and brick model with the help of Donatello and Nanni di Banco, a model which is still displayed in the Museo dell'Opera del Duomo. The model served as a guide for the craftsmen, but was intentionally incomplete, so as to ensure Brunelleschi's control over the construction.

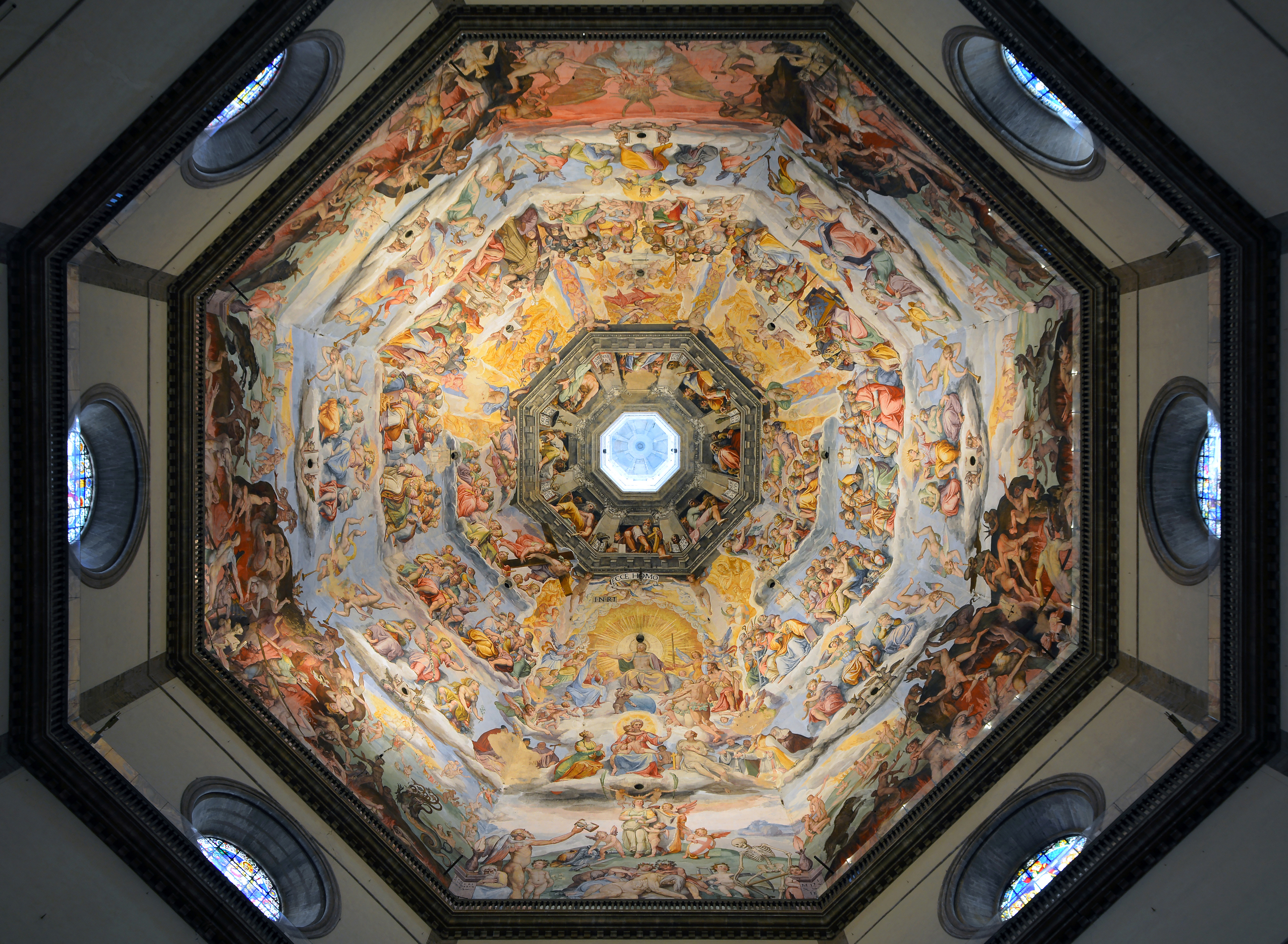
Interior of the dome

Brunelleschi's solutions were ingenious. The spreading problem was solved by a set of four internal horizontal stone and iron chains, serving as barrel hoops, embedded within the inner dome: one at the top, one at the bottom, with the remaining two evenly spaced between them. A fifth chain, made of wood, was placed between the first and second of the stone chains. Since the dome was octagonal rather than round, a simple chain, squeezing the dome like a barrel hoop, would have put all its pressure on the eight corners of the dome. The chains needed to be rigid octagons, stiff enough to hold their shape, so as not to deform the dome as they held it together.

Each of Brunelleschi's stone chains was built like an octagonal railroad track with parallel rails and cross ties, all made of sandstone beams 43 cm (17 in) in diameter and no more than 2.3 m (7.5 ft) long. The rails were connected end-to-end with lead-glazed iron splices. The cross ties and rails were notched together and then covered with the bricks and mortar of the inner dome. The cross ties of the bottom chain can be seen protruding from the drum at the base of the dome. The others are hidden. Each stone chain was supposed to be reinforced with a standard iron chain made of interlocking links, but a magnetic survey conducted in the 1970s failed to detect any evidence of iron chains, which if they exist are deeply embedded in the thick masonry walls. Brunelleschi also included vertical "ribs" set on the corners of the octagon, curving towards the center point. The ribs, 4 m (13 ft) deep, are supported by 16 concealed ribs radiating from center. The ribs had slits to take beams that supported platforms, thus allowing the work to progress upward without the need for scaffolding.

A circular masonry dome can be built without supports, called centering, because each course of bricks is a horizontal arch that resists compression. In Florence, the octagonal inner dome was thick enough for an imaginary circle to be embedded in it at each level, a feature that would hold the dome up eventually, but could not hold the bricks in place while the mortar was still wet. Brunelleschi used a herringbone brick pattern to transfer the weight of the freshly laid bricks to the nearest vertical ribs of the non-circular dome.

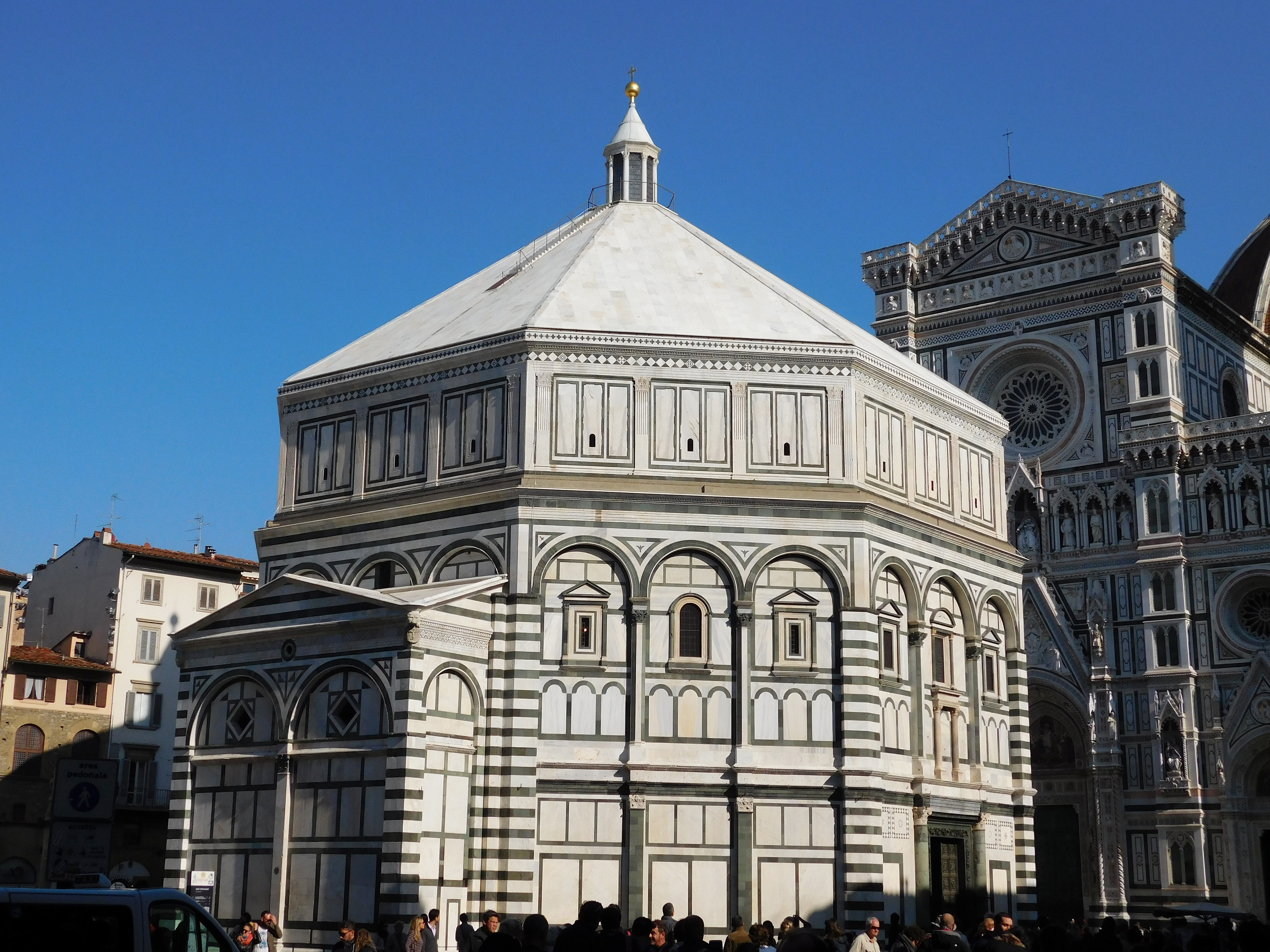
Baptistery of St. John next to the cathedral

The outer dome was not thick enough to contain embedded horizontal circles, being only 60 cm (2 ft) thick at the base and 30 cm (1 ft) thick at the top. To create such circles, Brunelleschi thickened the outer dome at the inside of its corners at nine different elevations, creating nine masonry rings, which can be observed today from the space between the two domes. To counteract hoop stress, the outer dome relies entirely on its attachment to the inner dome and has no embedded chains.

A modern understanding of physical laws and the mathematical tools for calculating stresses were centuries in the future. Brunelleschi, like all cathedral builders, had to rely on intuition and whatever he could learn from the large scale models he built. To lift 37,000 tons of material, including over 4 million bricks, he invented hoisting machines and lewissons for hoisting large stones. These specially designed machines and his structural innovations were Brunelleschi's chief contribution to architecture. Although he was executing an aesthetic plan made half a century earlier, it is his name, rather than Neri's, that is commonly associated with the dome.

Brunelleschi's ability to crown the dome with a lantern was questioned and he had to undergo another competition, even though there had been evidence that Brunelleschi had been working on a design for a lantern for the upper part of the dome. The evidence is shown in the curvature, which was made steeper than the original model. He was declared the winner over his competitors Lorenzo Ghiberti and Antonio Ciaccheri. His design (now on display in the Museum Opera del Duomo) was for an octagonal lantern with eight radiating buttresses and eight high arched windows. Construction of the lantern was begun a few months before his death in 1446. Then, for 15 years, little progress was possible, due to alterations by several architects. The lantern was finally completed by Brunelleschi's friend Michelozzo in 1461. The conical roof was crowned with a gilt copper ball and cross, containing holy relics, by Verrocchio in 1469. This brings the total height of the dome and lantern to 114.5 m (376 ft). This copper ball was struck by lightning on 17 July 1600 and fell down. It was replaced by an even larger one two years later.

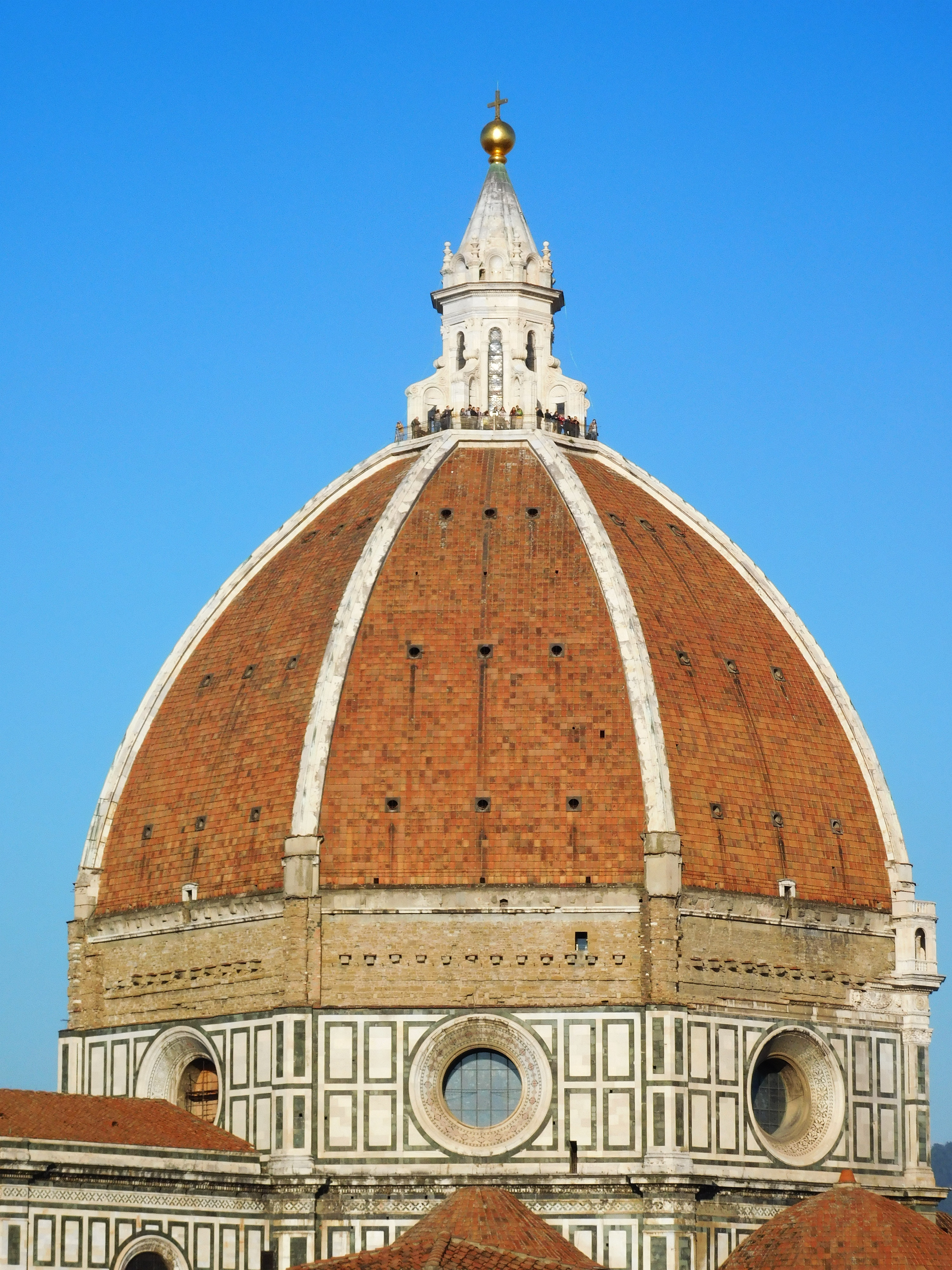
Cupola of the Dome

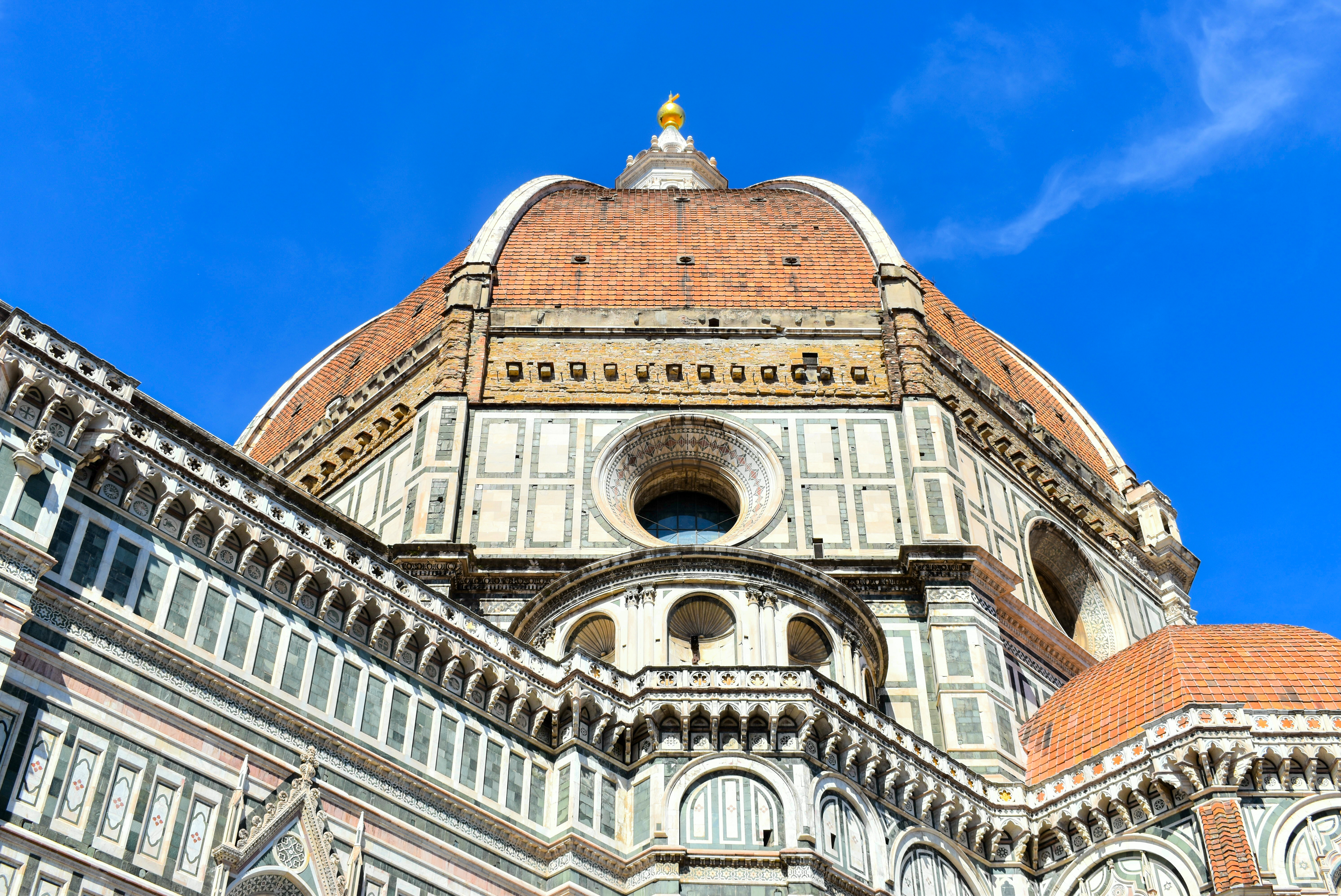
Dome from below

The commission for this gilt copper ball [atop the lantern] went to the sculptor Andrea del Verrocchio, in whose workshop Leonardo da Vinci was a young apprentice. Fascinated by Filippo's [Brunelleschi's] machines, which Verrocchio used to hoist the ball, Leonardo made a series of sketches of them and, as a result, is often given credit for their invention. Leonardo might have also participated in the design of the bronze ball, as stated in the G manuscript of Paris "Remember the way we soldered the ball of Santa Maria del Fiore".

The decorations of the drum gallery by Baccio d'Agnolo were never finished after being disapproved of by Michelangelo.

A statue of Brunelleschi sits outside the Palazzo dei Canonici in the Piazza del Duomo, looking up towards his greatest the dome that has dominated the panorama of Florence. It is still the largest masonry dome in the world.

The building of the cathedral had started in 1296 with the design of Arnolfo di Cambio and was completed in 1469 with the placing of Verrochio's copper ball atop the lantern. The façade was still unfinished and remained so until the 19th century.

=== Façade ===
The original façade, designed by Arnolfo di Cambio and usually attributed to Giotto, was actually begun twenty years after Giotto's death. A mid-15th-century pen-and-ink drawing of this so-called Giotto's façade is visible in the Codex Rustici, and in the drawing of Bernardino Poccetti in 1587, both on display in the Museum of the Opera del Duomo. This façade was the collective work of several artists, among them Andrea Orcagna and Taddeo Gaddi. This original façade was completed in only its lower portion and then left unfinished. It was dismantled in 1587–1588 by the Medici court architect Bernardo Buontalenti, ordered by Grand Duke Francesco I de' Medici, as it appeared totally outmoded in Renaissance times. Some of the original sculptures are on display in the Museum Opera del Duomo, behind the cathedral. Others are now in the Berlin Museum and in the Louvre.

The competition for a new façade turned into a huge corruption scandal. The wooden model for the façade of Buontalenti is on display in the Museum Opera del Duomo. A few new designs had been proposed in later years, but the models (of Giovanni Antonio Dosio, Giovanni de' Medici with Alessandro Pieroni and Giambologna) were not accepted. The façade was then left bare until the 19th century.

In 1864, a competition held to design a new façade was won by Emilio De Fabris (1808–1883) in 1871. Work began in 1876 and was completed in 1887. This neo-gothic façade in white, green and red marble forms a harmonious entity with the cathedral, Giotto's bell tower and the Baptistery.

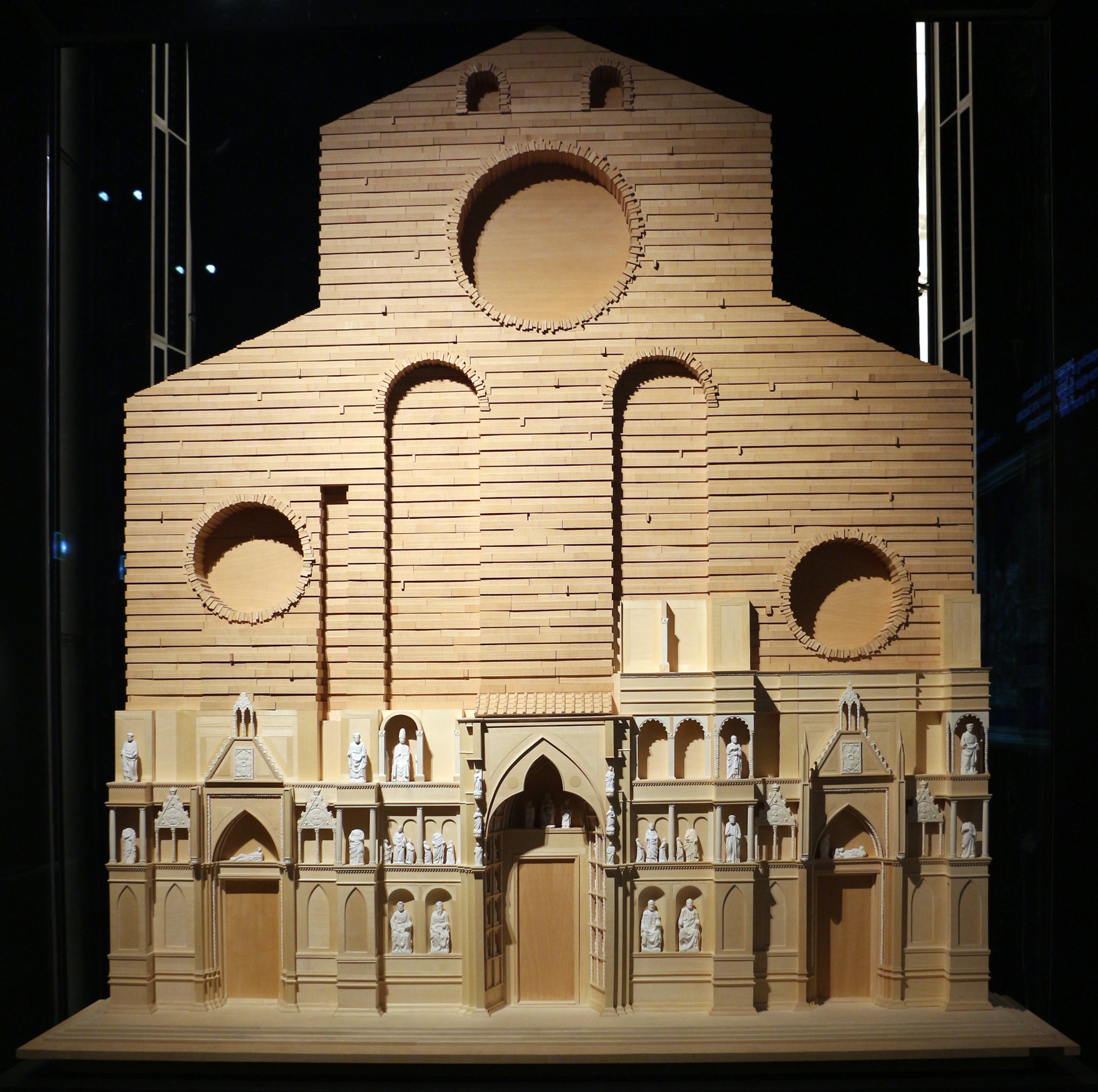
Model of the original medieval façade in the museum of the cathedral

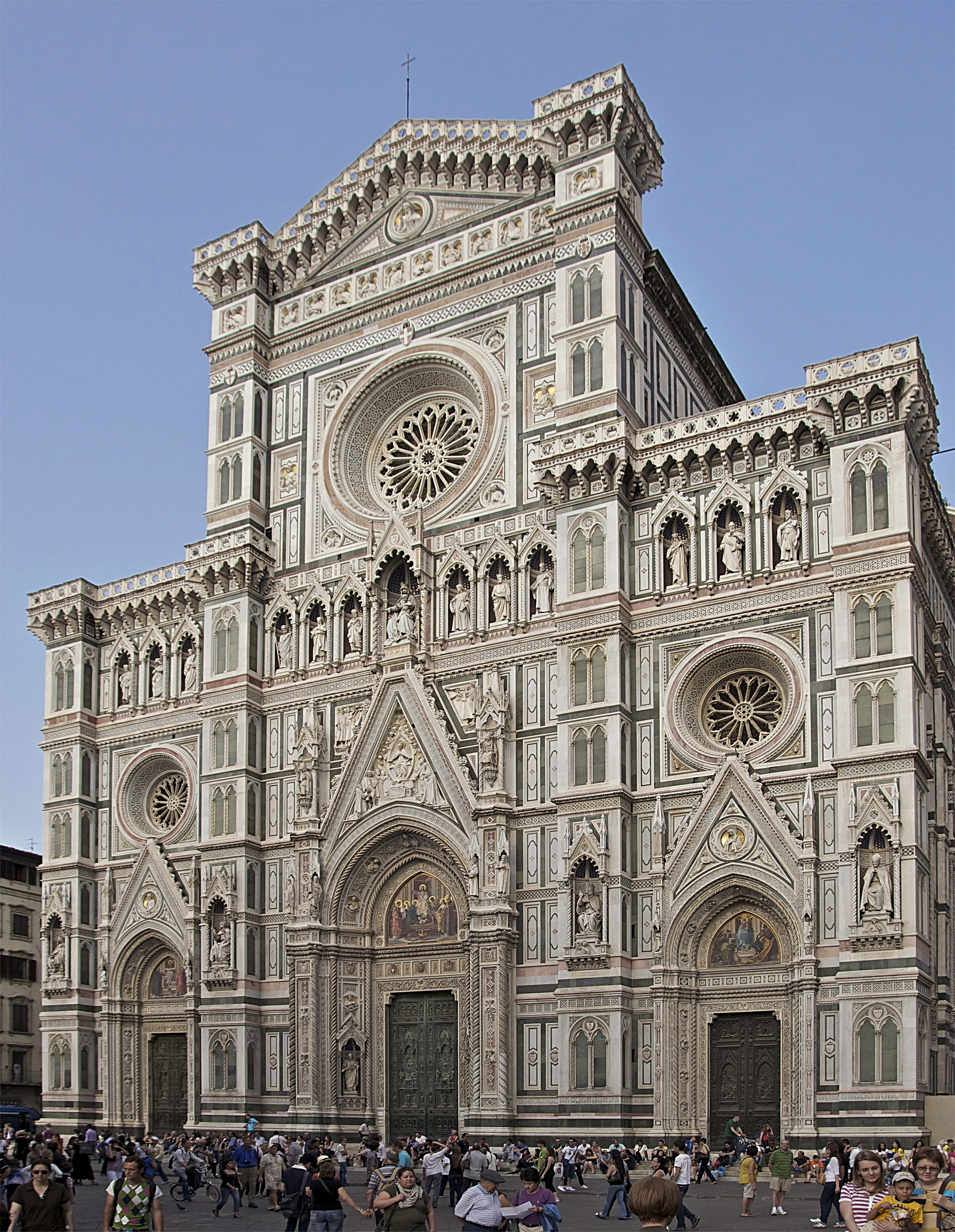
Modern façade built in the 19th century

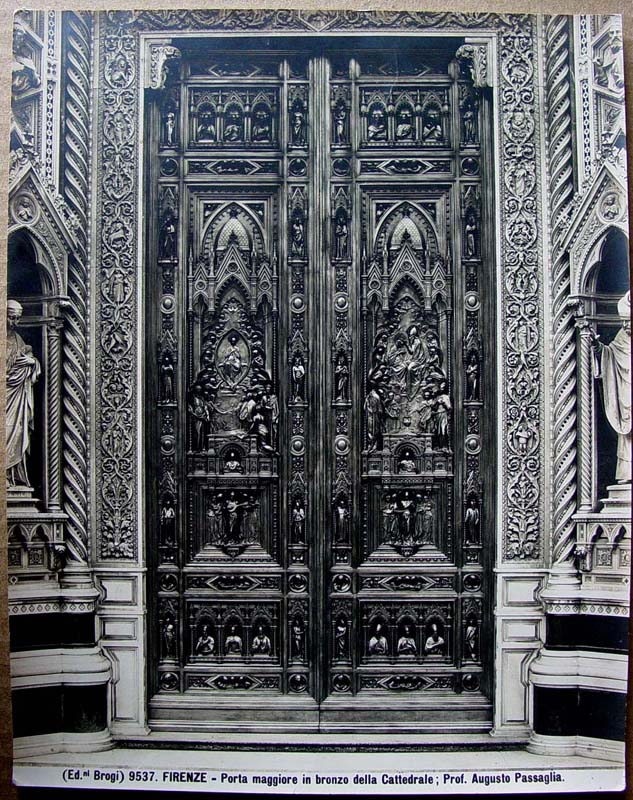
Main portal by Augusto Passaglia

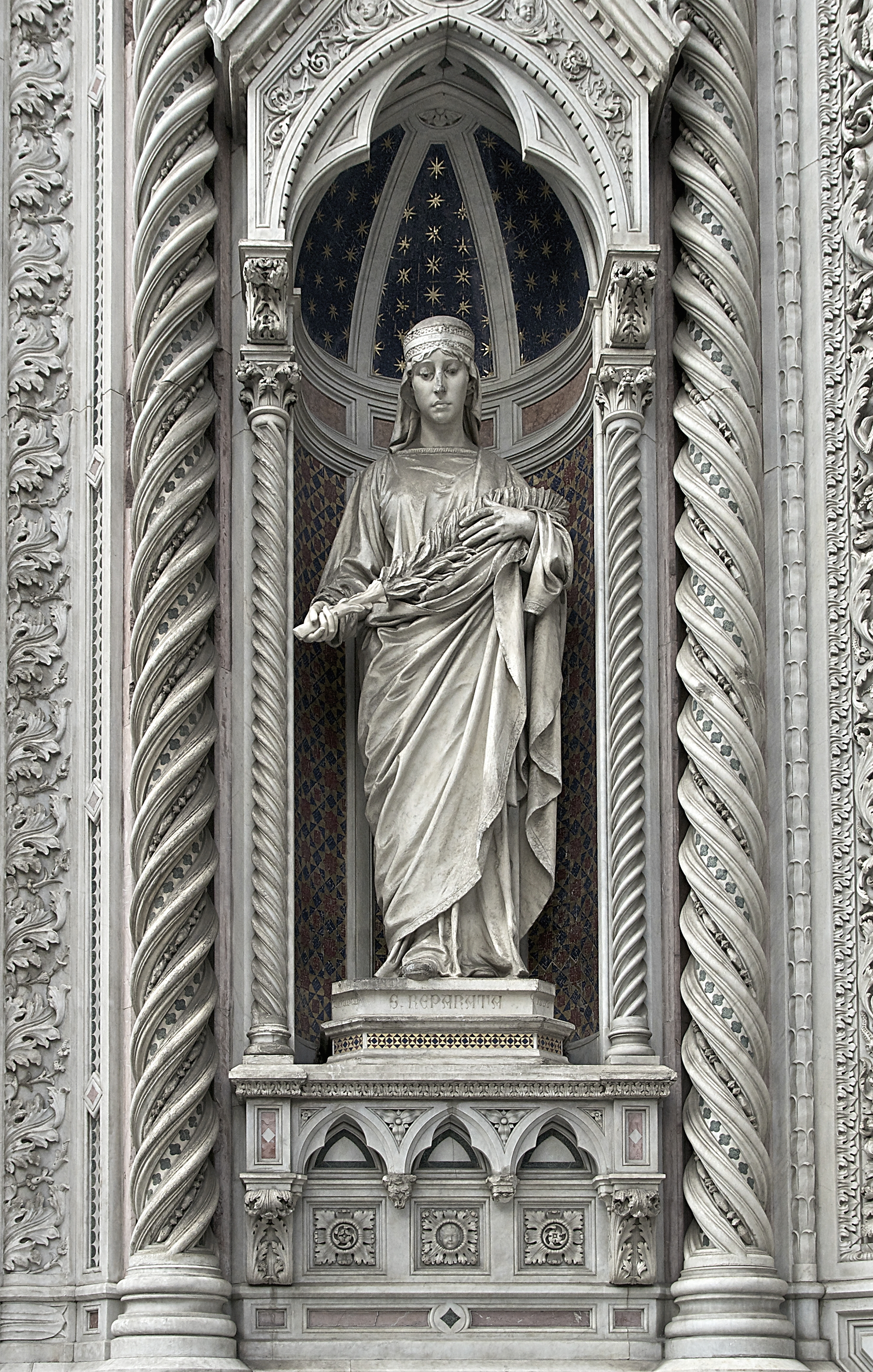
Statue of Saint Reparata, to whom the previous cathedral was dedicated, in the main portal

== Main portal ==
The three huge bronze doors date from 1899 to 1903. They are adorned with scenes from the life of the Madonna. The mosaics in the lunettes above the doors were designed by Niccolò Barabino. They represent (from left to right): Charity among the founders of Florentine philanthropic institutions; Christ enthroned with Mary and John the Baptist; and Florentine artisans, merchants and humanists. The pediment above the central portal contains a half-relief by Tito Sarrocchi of Mary enthroned holding a flowered scepter. Giuseppe Cassioli sculpted the right-hand door.

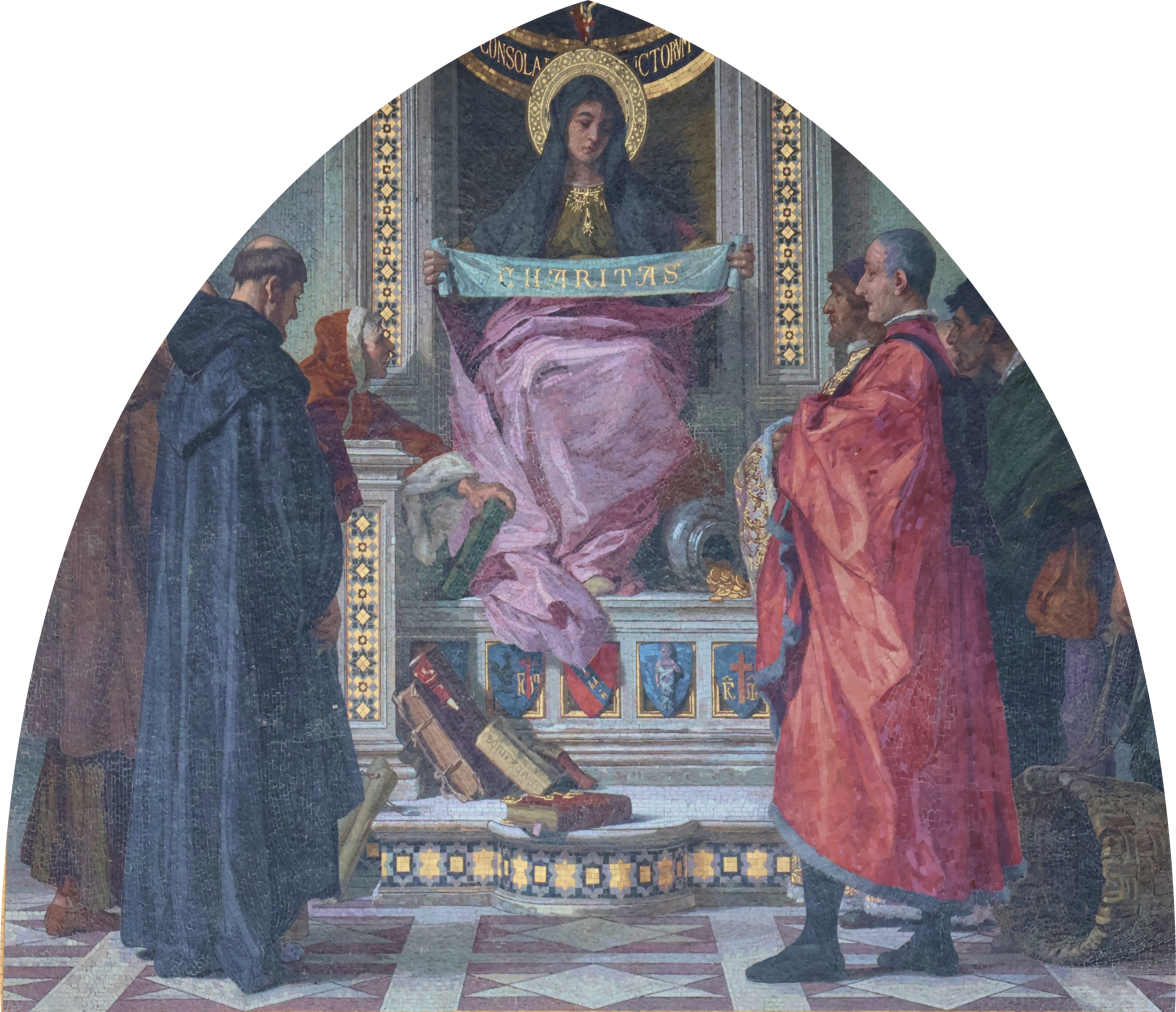
Charity among the founders of Florentine philanthropic institutions

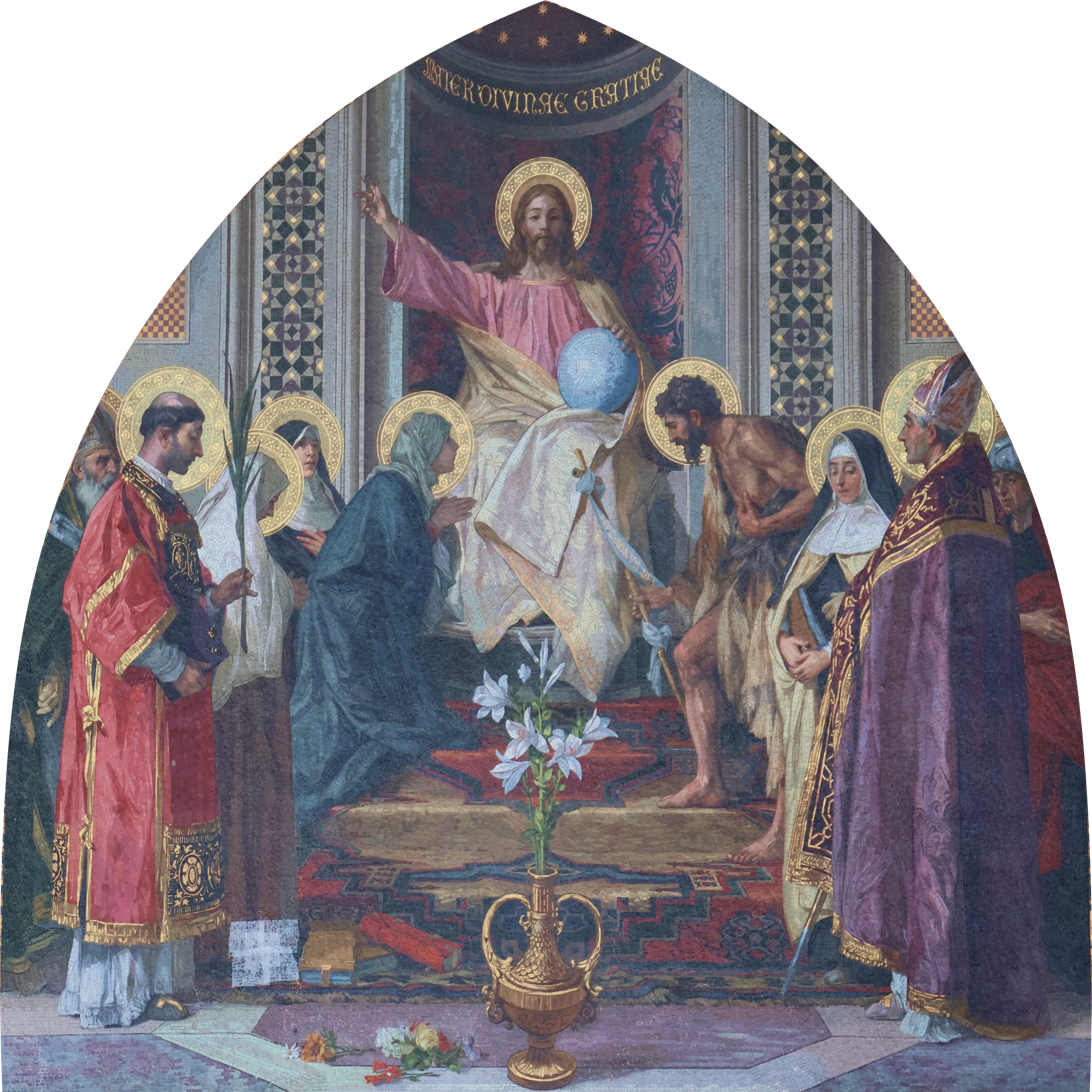
Christ enthroned with Mary and John the Baptist

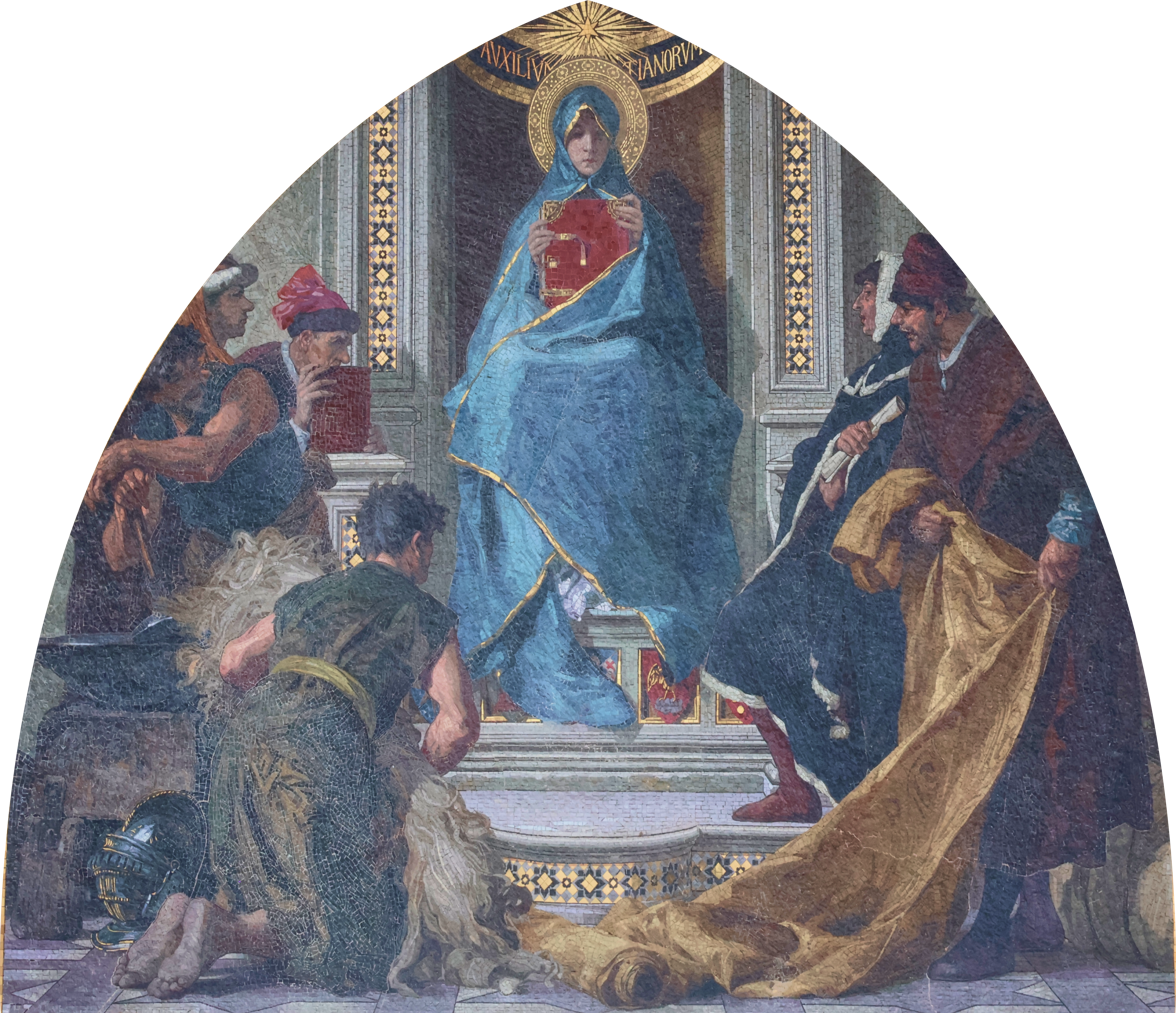
Florentine artisans, merchants and humanists

On top of the façade is a series of niches with the twelve Apostles with, in the middle, the Madonna with Child. Between the rose window and the tympanum, there is a gallery with busts of great Florentine artists.

== Interior ==
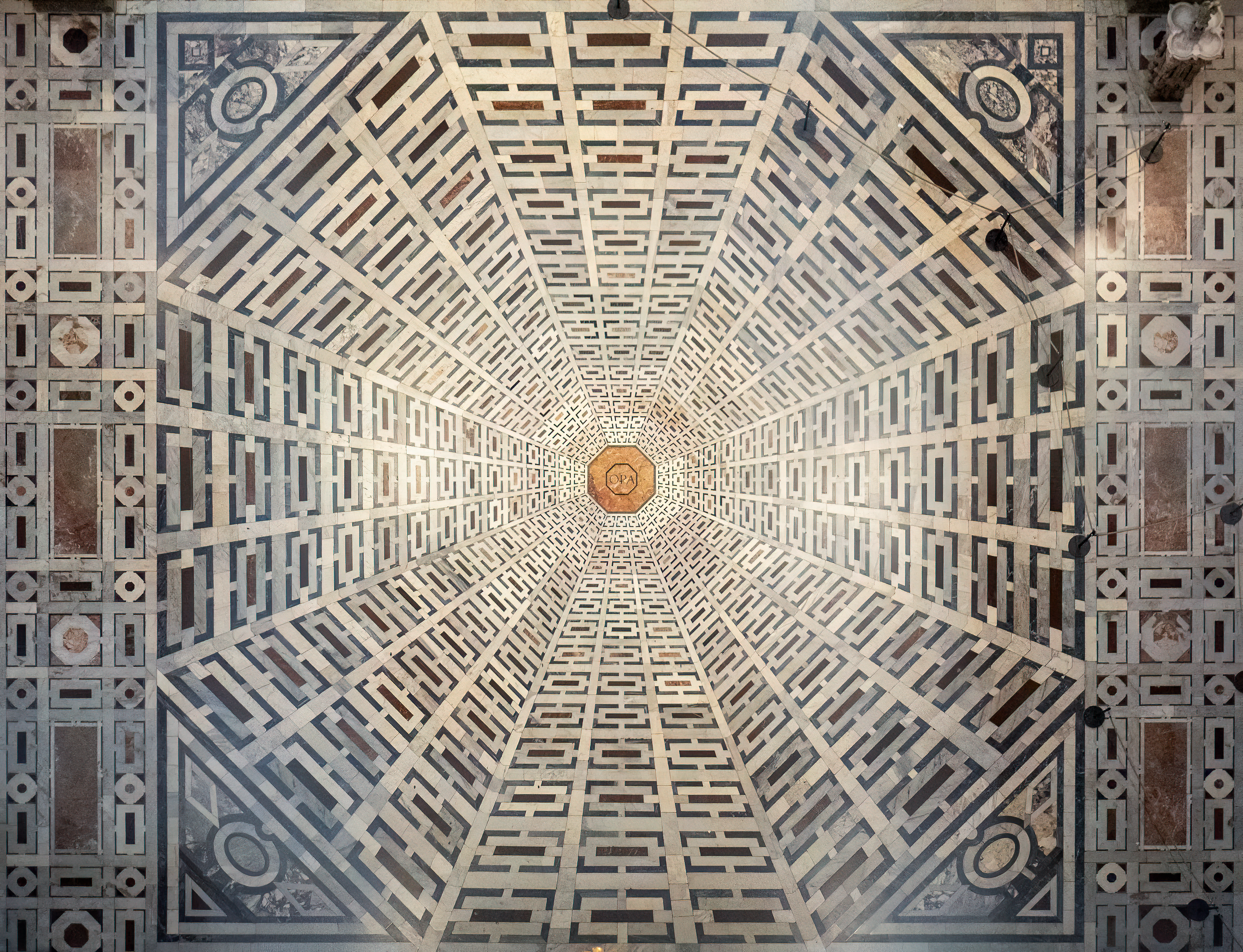
Perspective illusion on the floor of the cathedral

The Late Gothic interior is vast and gives an impression of emptiness. The relative bareness of the church corresponds with the austerity of religious life as practiced by the mendicant orders founded in the second half of the 12th and at the beginning of the 13th century.

Many decorations in the church have been lost in the course of time, or have been transferred to the Museo dell' Opera del Duomo, such as the magnificent singing lofts (cantorie) by Luca della Robbia and Donatello.

As this cathedral was built with funds from the public, some important works of art in this church honour illustrious men and military leaders (condottiere) of Florence, namely a depiction of Dante and the frescoed equestrian statues of Sir John Hawkwood and Niccolò da Tolentino.

Lorenzo Ghiberti had a large artistic impact on the cathedral. Ghiberti worked with Filippo Brunelleschi on the cathedral for eighteen years and had a large number of projects on almost the whole east end. Some of his works are the stained glass designs for the oculi in the drum, the bronze shrine of Saint Zenobius and marble revetments on the outside of the cathedral.

- Dante Before the City of Florence by Domenico di Michelino (1465). The fresco depicts Dante Alighieri with the three settings of the Divine Comedy alongside an anachronistic depiction of the cathedral.
- Funerary Monument to Sir John Hawkwood by Paolo Uccello (1436). This almost monochrome fresco, transferred to canvas in the 19th century, is painted in terra verde, a pigment closest to the patina of bronze.
- Equestrian statue of Niccolò da Tolentino by Andrea del Castagno (1456). This fresco, transferred on canvas in the 19th century, in the same style as the previous one, is painted to resemble marble. However, it is more richly decorated and gives more the impression of movement. Both frescoes portray the condottieri as heroic figures riding triumphantly. Both painters had problems when applying in painting the new rules of perspective to foreshortening: instead of a single vanishing point, both applied two separate points, one for the horse and one for the pedestal.
- Busts of Giotto (by Benedetto da Maiano), Brunelleschi (by Buggiano – 1447), Marsilio Ficino, and Antonio Squarcialupi (a most famous organist). These busts all date from the 15th and the 16th centuries.

Above the main door is the colossal clock face with fresco portraits of four Prophets or Evangelists by Paolo Uccello (1443). This one-handed liturgical clock shows the 24 hours of the hora italica ("Italian time"), a period of time ending with sunset at 24 hours. This timetable was used until the 18th century. This is one of the few clocks from that time that still exist and are in working order.

The church is particularly notable for its 44 stained glass windows, the largest undertaking of this kind in Italy in the 14th and 15th century. The windows in the aisles and in the transept depict saints from the Old and the New Testament, while the circular windows in the drum of the dome or above the entrance depict Christ and Mary. They were made after designs by the greatest Florentine artists of their time, such as Donatello, Lorenzo Ghiberti, Paolo Uccello and Andrea del Castagno.

Christ Crowning Mary as Queen, the stained-glass circular window above the clock, with a rich range of colouring, was designed by Gaddo Gaddi in the early 14th century.

Donatello designed the stained-glass window (Coronation of the Virgin) in the drum of the dome (the only one that can be seen from the nave).

The funeral monument of Antonio d'Orso (1323), bishop of Florence, was made by Tino da Camaino, the most important funeral sculptor of his time.

The monumental crucifix, behind the Bishop's Chair at the high altar, is by Benedetto da Maiano (1495–1497). The choir enclosure is the work of the famous Bartolommeo Bandinelli. The ten-paneled bronze doors of the sacristy were made by Luca della Robbia, who has also two glazed terracotta works inside the sacristy: Angel with Candlestick and Resurrection of Christ.

In the back of the middle of the three apses is the altar of Saint Zanobius, first bishop of Florence. Its silver shrine, a masterpiece of Ghiberti, contains the urn with his relics. The central compartment shows us one of his miracles, the reviving of a dead child. Above this shrine is the painting Last Supper by the lesser-known Giovanni Balducci. There was also a glass-paste mosaic panel The Bust of Saint Zanobius by the 16th-century miniaturist Monte di Giovanni, but it is now on display in the Museum Opera del Duomo.

Many decorations date from the 16th-century patronage of the Grand Dukes, such as the pavement in coloured marble, attributed to Baccio d'Agnolo and Francesco da Sangallo (1520–26). Some pieces of marble from the façade were used, topside down, in the flooring (as was shown by the restoration of the floor after the 1966 flooding).

The ceiling of the dome is decorated with a representation of The Last Judgment. Originally left whitewashed following its completion it was the Grand Duke Cosimo I de' Medici who decided to have the ceiling of the dome painted. This enormous work with 3,600 metres² (38 750 ft²) of painted surface was commenced in 1572 by Giorgio Vasari and would not be completed until 1579. The upper portion, near the lantern, representing The 24 Elders of Apocalypse was finished by Vasari before his death in 1574. Federico Zuccari with the assistance of Bartolomeo Carducci, Domenico Passignano and Stefano Pieri finished the other portions: (from top to bottom) Choirs of Angels; Christ, Mary and Saints; Virtues, Gifts of the Holy Spirit and Beatitudes; and at the bottom of the cupola: Capital Sins and Hell. These frescoes are considered Zuccari's greatest work. But the quality of the work is uneven because of the input of different artists and the different techniques. Vasari had used true fresco, while Zuccari had painted in secco. During the restoration work, which ended in 1995, the entire pictorial cycle of The Last Judgment was photographed with specially designed equipment and all the information collected in a catalogue. All the restoration information along with reconstructed images of the frescos were stored and managed in the Thesaurus Florentinus computer system.

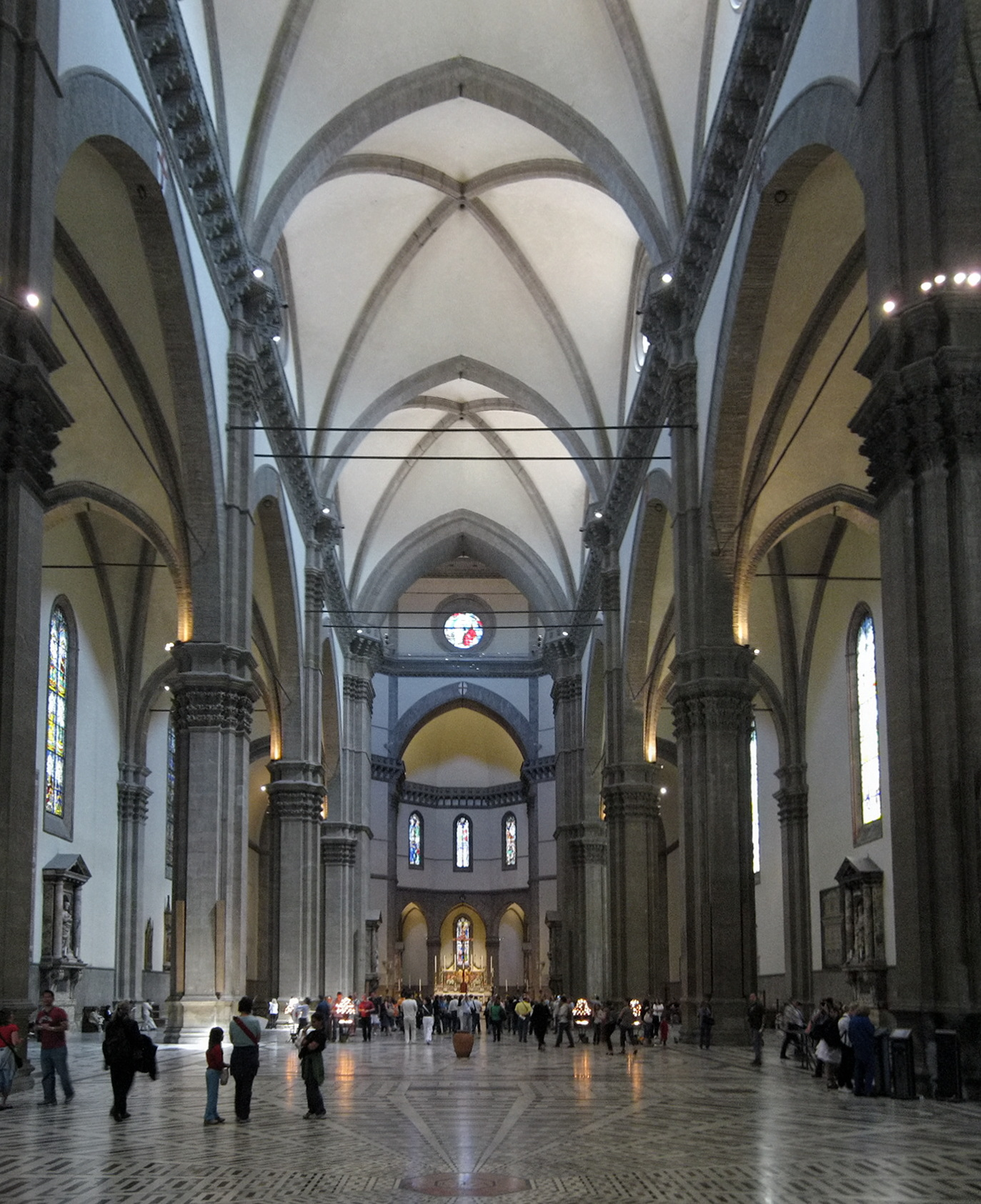
Interior of the cathedral

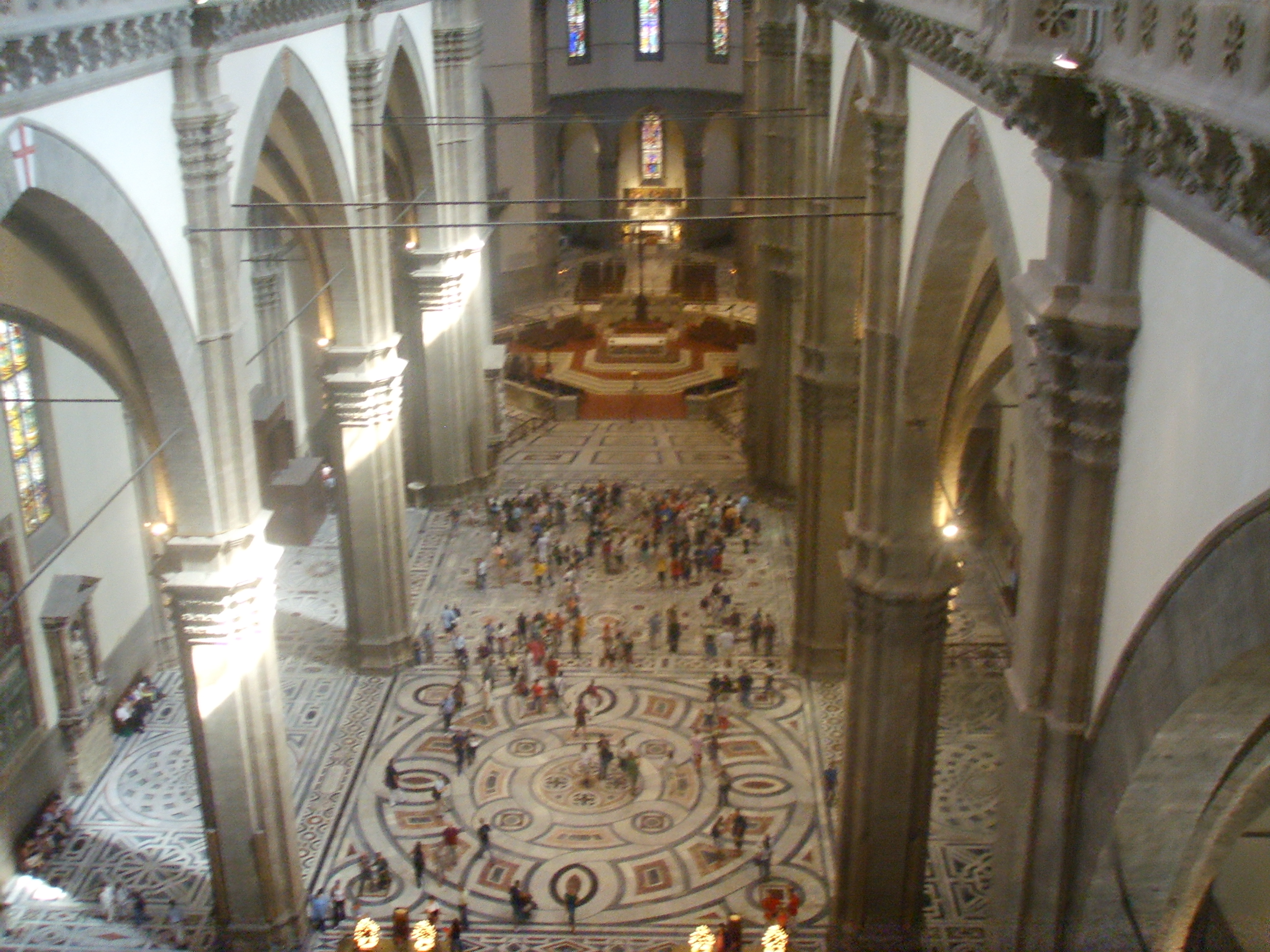
Interior

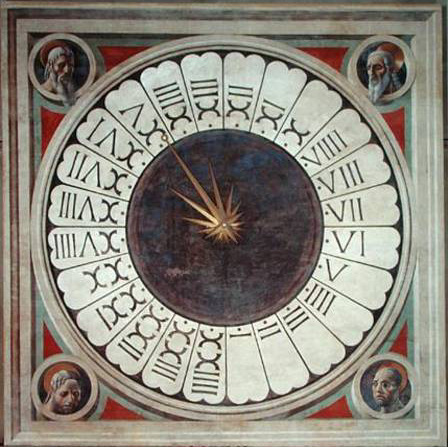
Huge clock decorated by Paolo Uccello

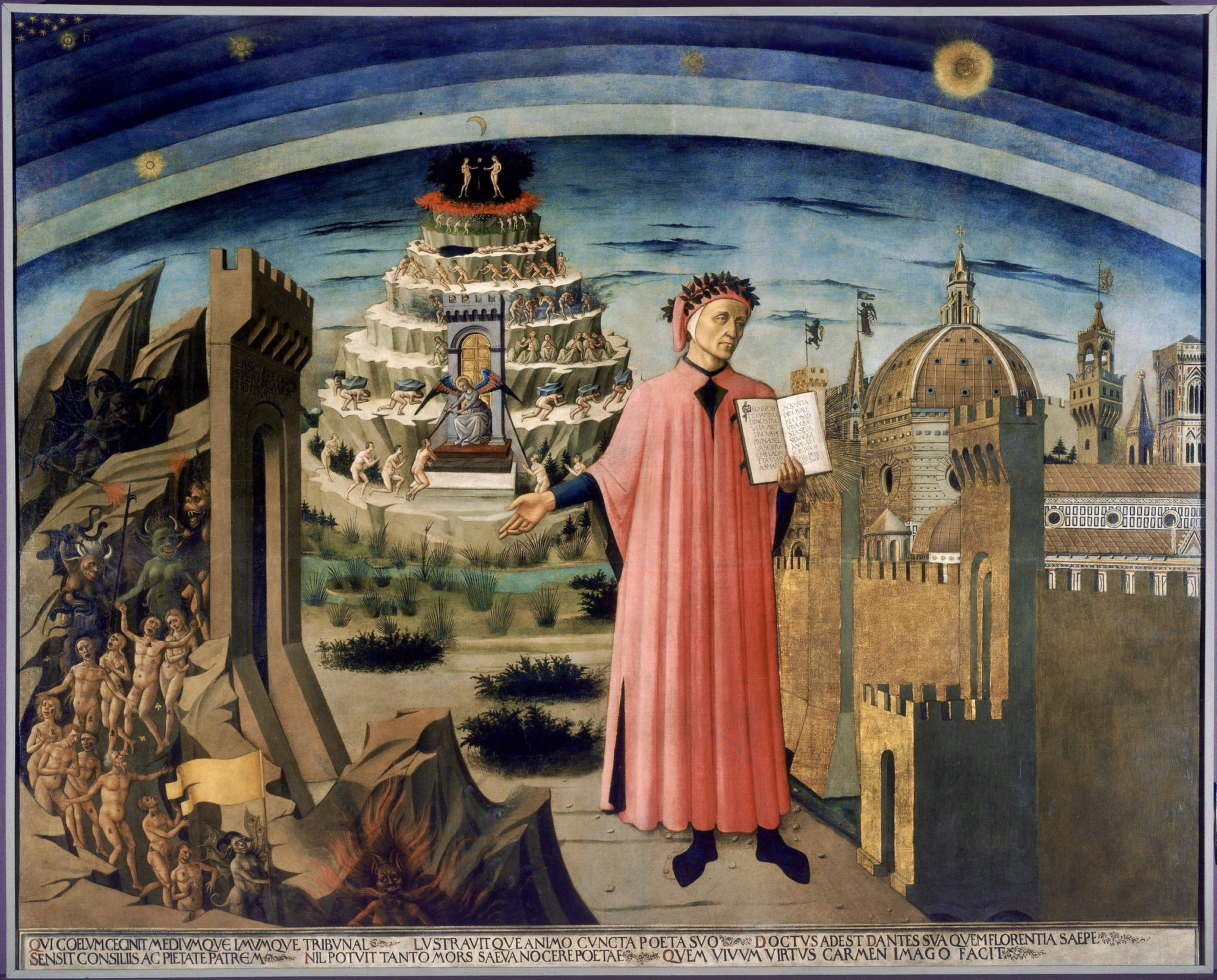
Dante and the Divine Comedy

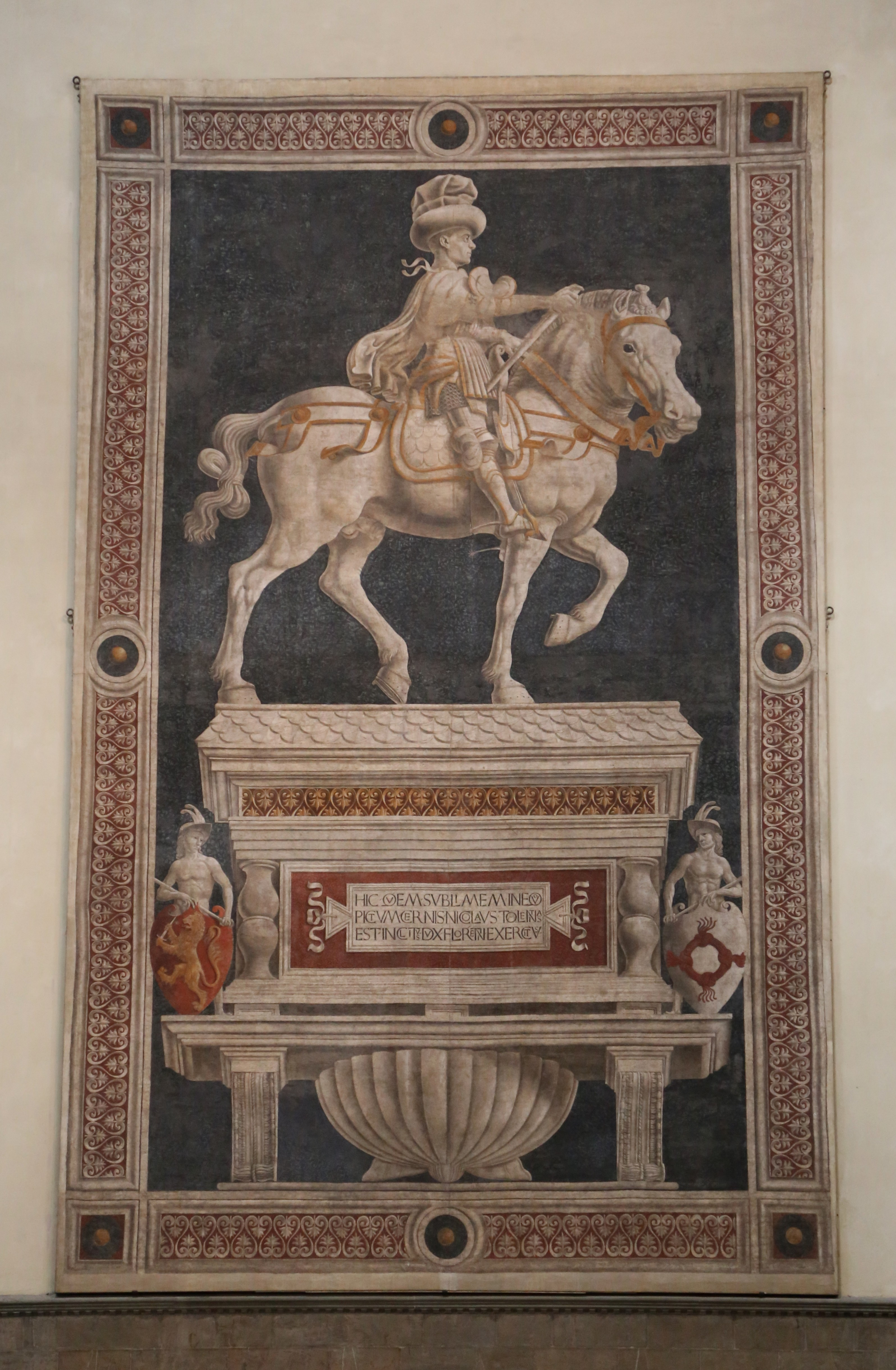
Trompe-l'œil of Niccolò da Tolentino

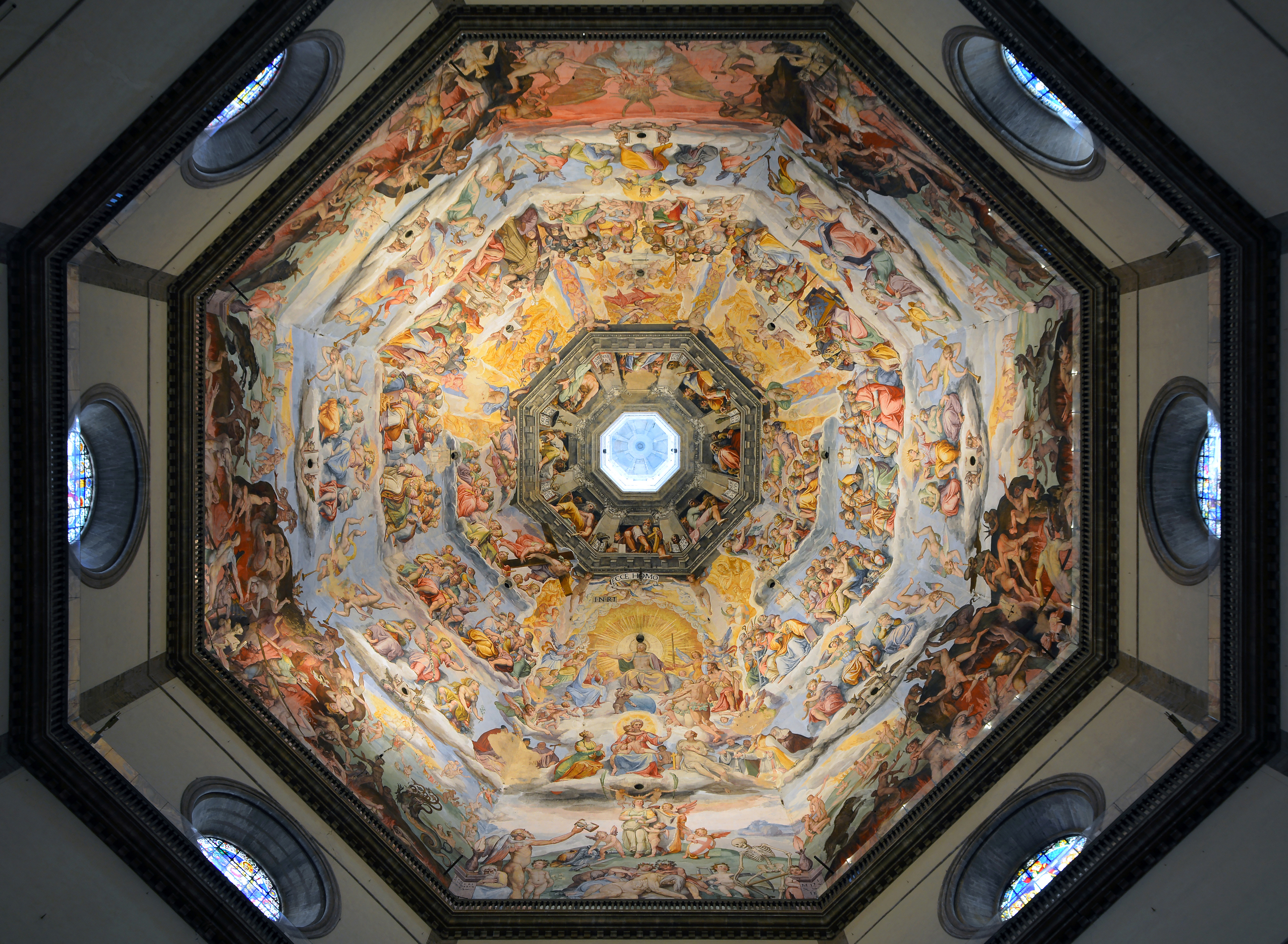
The Last Judgement by Vasari and Zuccari (from directly underneath)

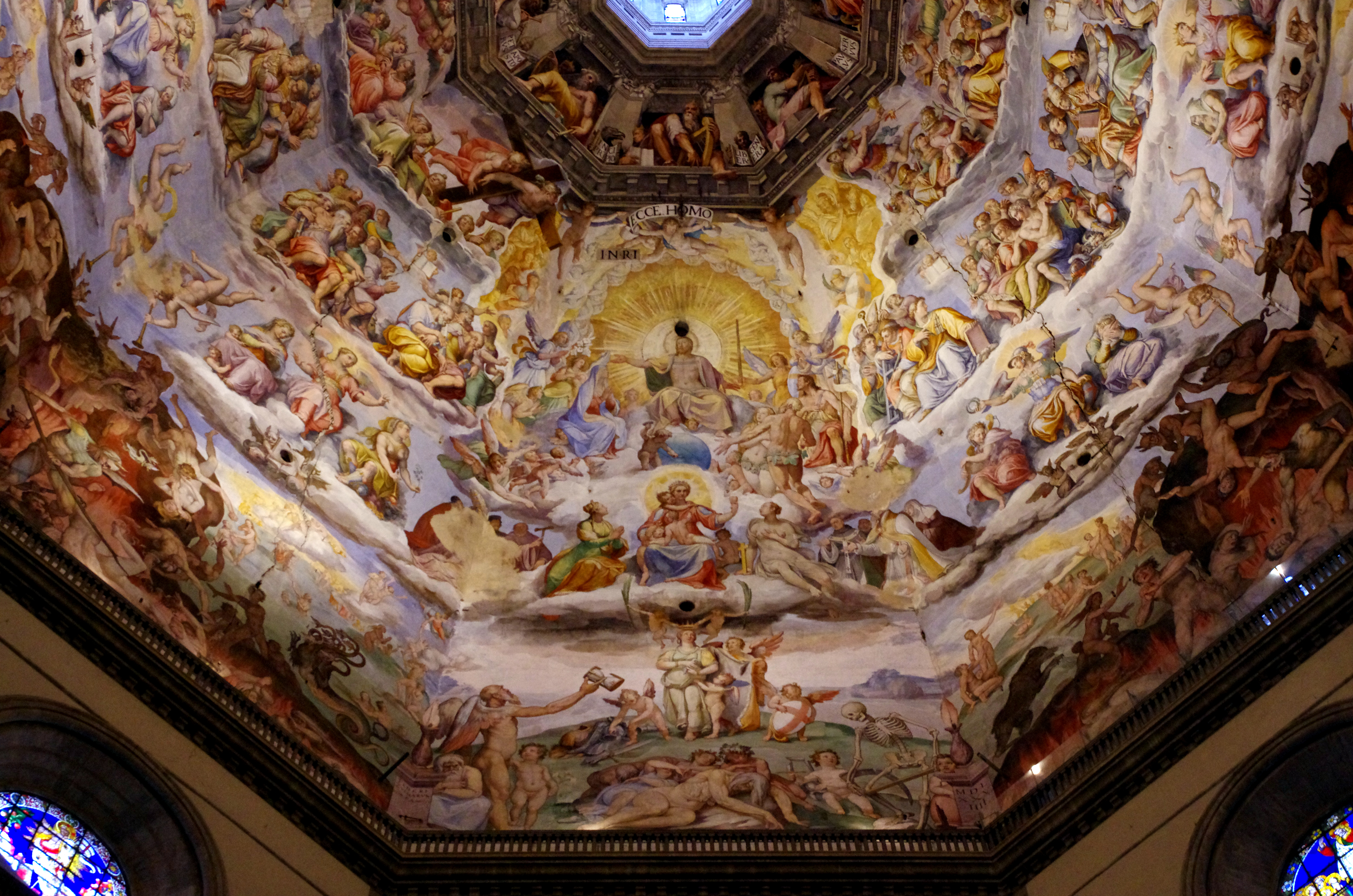
The Last Judgement by Vasari and Zuccari

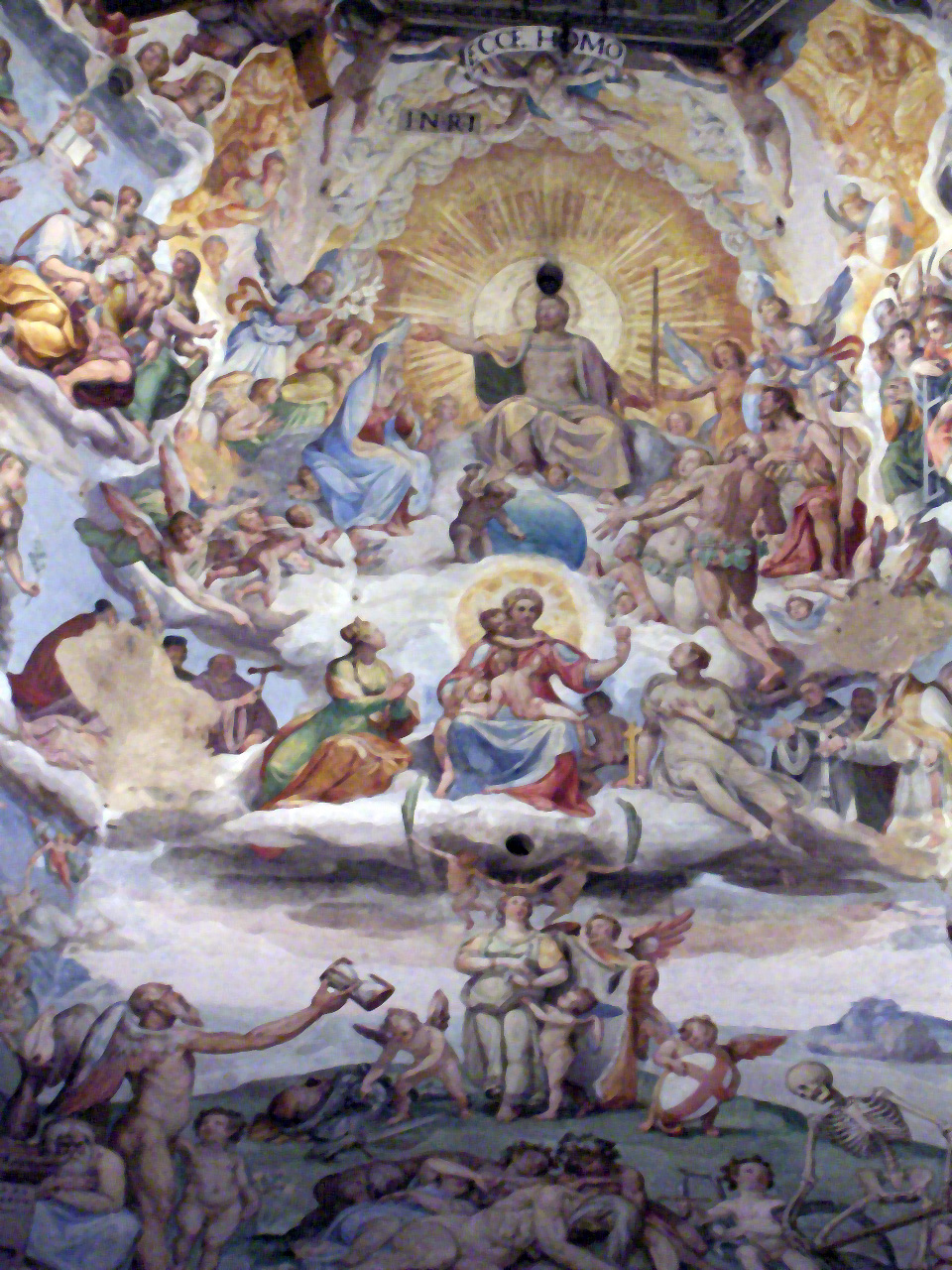
Detail of The Last Judgement by Vasari and Zuccari

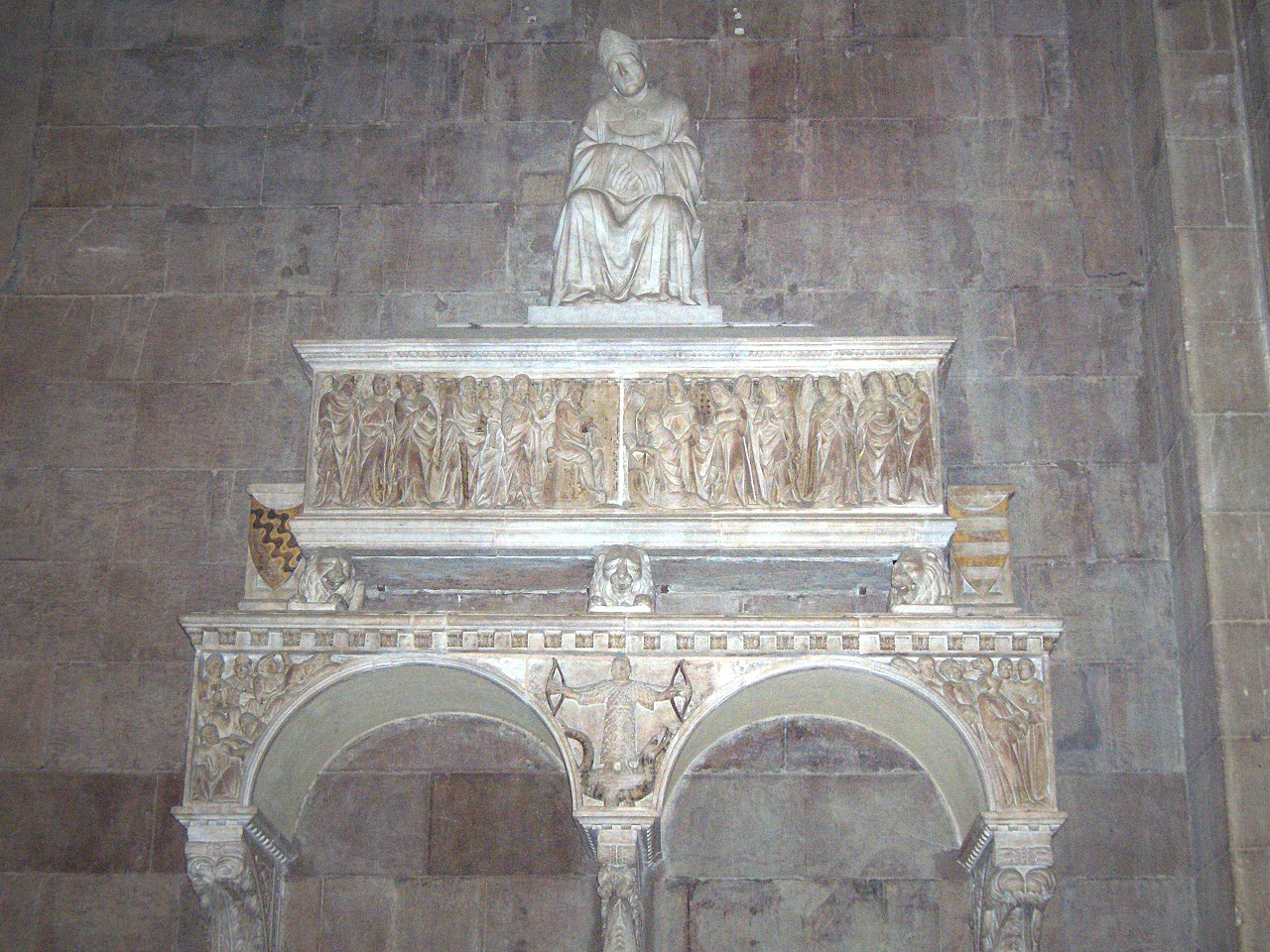
Tomb of Antonio d'Orso by Tino da Camaino

== Astronomical observations ==
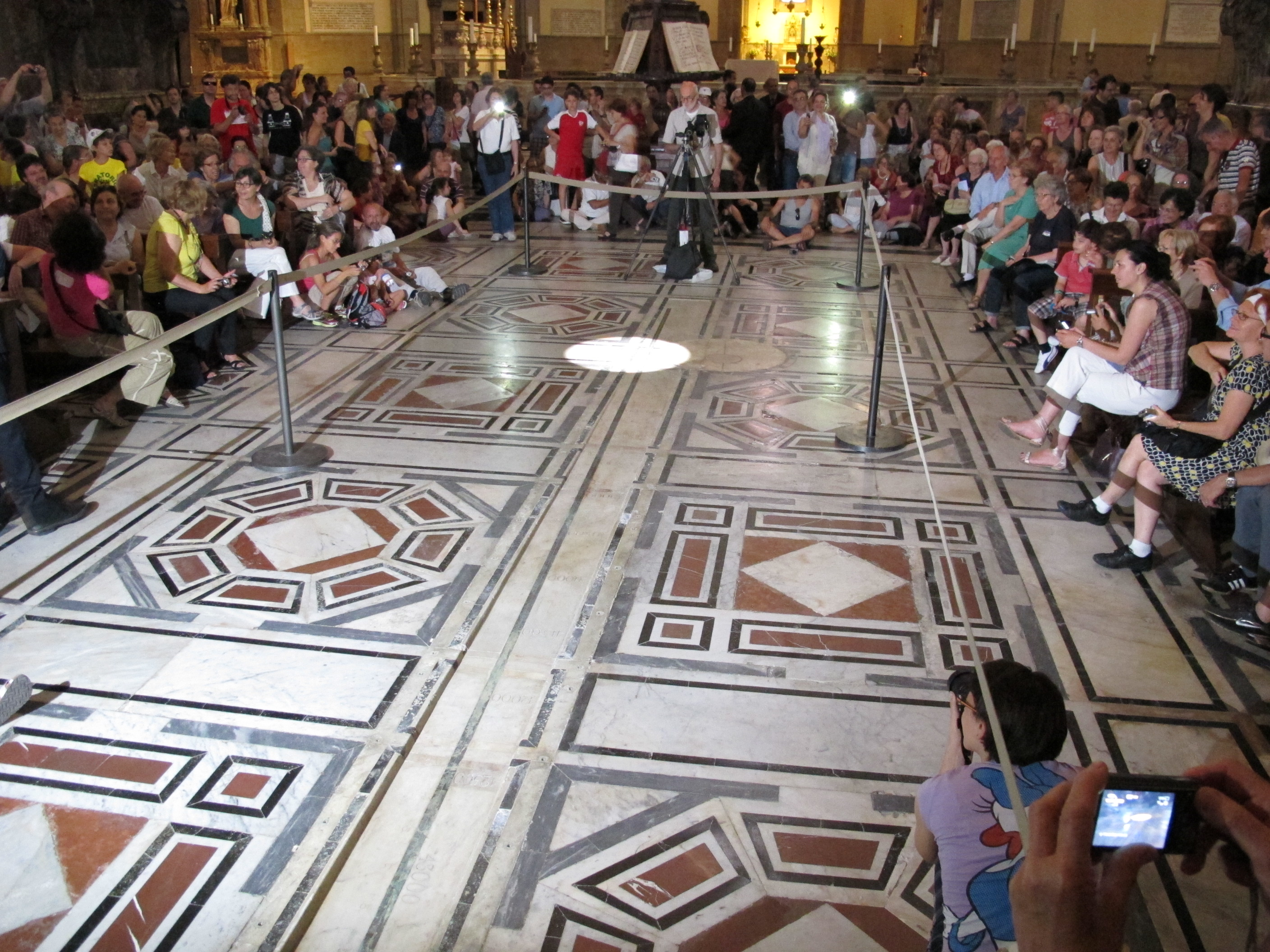
Observation of the solstice on 21 June 2012

In 1475 the Italian astronomer Paolo dal Pozzo Toscanelli (who was also a mathematical tutor of Brunelleschi) pierced a hole in the dome at 91.05 metres (298.7 ft) above the pavement to create a meridian line. The height precluded the installation of a complete meridian line on the floor of the cathedral, but allowed a short section of approximately 10 metres (33 ft) to run between the main altar and the north wall of the transept. This allows for observation for around 35 days either side of the summer solstice.

Due to settlement in the building and also movements due to the outside temperature changes, the meridian line had limited astronomical value and fell into disuse until it was restored in 1755 by Leonardo Ximenes.

The meridian line was covered over by the fabbricieri in 1894 and unveiled again in 1997. A yearly re-enactment of the observation takes place on 21 June each year at 12:00 UT.

== Crypt ==
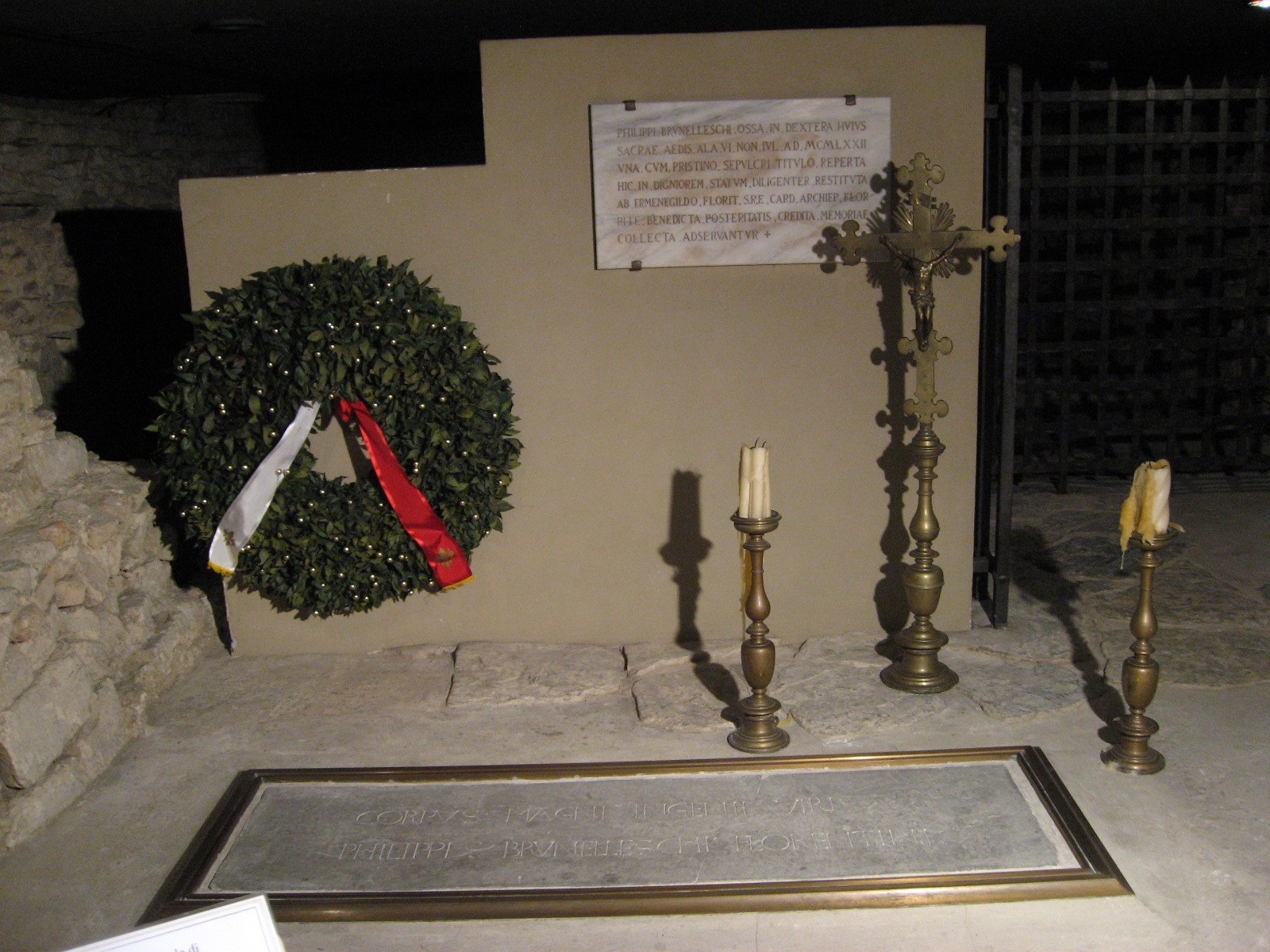
Tomb of Filippo Brunelleschi

The cathedral underwent difficult excavations between 1965 and 1974. The archaeological history of this huge area was reconstructed through the work of Franklin Toker: remains of Roman houses, an early Christian pavement, ruins of the former cathedral of Santa Reparata and successive enlargements of this church. Close to the entrance, in the part of the crypt open to the public, is the tomb of Brunelleschi. While its location is prominent, the actual tomb is simple and humble.

=== Other burials ===
- Zenobius of Florence
- Conrad II of Italy
- Giovanni Benelli
- Filippo Brunelleschi
- Giotto di Bondone
- Pope Nicholas II
- Pope Stephen IX
- John Hawkwood

== Cracking of the dome ==
The cathedral at night from Piazzale Michelangelo

The unreinforced masonry that Brunelleschi used to construct the dome is weak in tension which leads to cracking when tensile stresses exceed the limited masonry tensile strength. The material is especially susceptible to damage from seismic loading due to its heterogeneity and many surfaces between different materials (stones to mortar connection).

Cracking of the dome was observed even before its construction was completed. It is possible that the first cracks were caused by a strong earthquake in 1453.

The first written evidence about the presence of cracks appears in a report by Gherardo Silvani report dated 18 September 1639 which refers to "peli" ("hairs"). In 1694 Giambattista Nelli and Vincenzo Viviani surveyed the cracks with Nelli recording that there were two major cracks with a maximum width of 29 mm (1.1 in). They believed that the cracks were caused by the weight of the dome, and the resulting horizontal thrusts on the pillars. A commission, headed by Vincenzo Viviani, carried out investigations in 1695 and came to the conclusion that the cracking was due to the dead weight of the buildings. It was proposed that the dome be strengthened by installing four large iron belts; three on the outside of the dome between the bulging area of the dome and the circular windows, while the fourth would be installed internally in the second walkway between the two shells. This was similar to what had been done on the dome of St. Peter's in Rome. After a long debate, a decision was made to leave the dome as it was.

The first most complete survey of the cracks was published in 1757 by the Jesuit Leonardo Ximenes (1716–1786). In his document he described 13 different crack typologies. In 1934, Pier Luigi Nervi, who was head of a special commission established by the Opera del Duomo to study the cracking, observed that the cracks opened and closed with the seasons. In the winter, the dome's stone and bricks would contract causing the cracks to widen, while over the summer the materials would expand and the cracks would close up. While modern buildings by design incorporate expansion joints, the cathedral's dome does not include any and so subsequently developed its own expansion joints in the form of these cracks which allowed the structure to "breathe". To date they have not caused any catastrophic damage to the dome.

In 1955 the Opera del Duomo installed 22 mechanical deformometers, which were read four times a year to record the variations in the width of the major cracks in the inner dome. At the same time the dome's internal and external temperatures were also recorded. This remained in service until 2009.

In 1975 a commission was appointed by the Italian government to safeguard the dome. In 1978 a government culture agency decided to restore the frescoes. Brunelleschi left forty eight 600 mm (24 in) holes in the base of the dome. They are open on the inside and covered by the outer skin of the dome. It has long been assumed that the holes simply served as mounts for the scaffold used when frescoes were painted on the inside of the dome. While the holes had been able to support the scaffolding used for the creation of the frescos on the interior of the dome they were not strong enough for the network of modern metal scaffolding necessary to provide access for the restoration work undertaken on the frescos between 1979 and 1995. To strengthen the scaffolding, the private company contracted to build scaffolding for the work was allowed in 1982 to fill the holes with concrete so that steel beams could be anchored in them.

In 1985 local architect Lando Bartoli noticed that additional cracks were forming around the sealed holes. It was theorized at the time that in summer the four major masses separated by the "A" cracks expanded into the fissures, but now, at the base of the dome, the masses come up against the unyielding concrete that now fills the 48 holes acts as a fulcrum which causes the energy that was once dissipated with the closing of the fissures and into the holes to be transferred into the upper areas of the dome. However analysis by Andrea Chiarugi, Michele Fanelli and Giuseppetti (published in 1983) found that the principal source of the cracks was a dead-weight effect due to the geometry of the dome, its weight (estimated to be 25,000 tons) and the insufficient resistance of the ring beam, while thermal variations, has caused fatigue loading and thus expanding of the structure. This is a well-known collapse mechanism typical of domed structures: a lowering of the top of the structure under its own weight with significant horizontal thrusts on the bearing elements.

In 1985 a commission established by the Italian Ministry of Cultural and Monumental Heritage accepted this theory. The debate about the filling of the scaffolding holes was finally settled in 1987 when it was demonstrated that closing the 48 holes had had no impact on the expansion and contraction of the dome. A survey completed in 1984 counted a total of 493 cracks of various sizes, sorted into categories identified by the letters "A" through "D". These are as follows:

- Type A. These are sub-vertical major cracks that start from the ring beam and continue upwards for approximately two-thirds of the height of the dome; they pass through both the internal and external layer of the even webs and their range in thickness from 55 mm (2.2 in) to 60 mm (2.4 in) (webs 4 and 6) and 25 mm (0.98 in) to 30 mm (1.2 in) (webs 2 and 8). The dome has eight webs numbered counter clockwise from 1, which faces the main nave of the cathedral. These effectively divide the dome into quarters and never completely close in summer. There is a theory that the plaster used to patch the cracks over the years and crumbling building materials have jammed the fissures.
- Type B. These sub-vertical minor cracks are located near the circular windows.
- Type C. These are sub-vertical minor cracks that are present around the eight edges of the dome.
- Type D . These are four sub-vertical minor cracks in the internal part of the odd webs. They do not pass through the width of the dome.

All have formed in a symmetrical pattern.

The development of the Type "A" cracks means that the dome now permanently behaves as four drifting half-arches linked below the upper oculus. The abutments of these half-arches are constituted by the pillars, the chapels and the nave of the church. The differences in the cracking patterns between even and odd webs is believed to be due to variations in the stiffness of the supporting ring beam structure under the dome as it is supported by four heavy pillars which line up with the even webs while the odd webs are located over four arches which connect the pillars.

In 1987 a second, more comprehensive digital system (which automatically collects data every six hours) was installed by ISMES (in cooperation with the Soprintendenza, the local branch of the Ministry of Culture, which is responsible for the conservation of all historical monuments in Florence). It consists of 166 instruments, among which are 60 thermometers measuring the masonry and air temperature at various locations, 72 inductive type displacement transducers (deformometers) at various levels on the main cracks of the inner and outer domes; eight plumb-lines at the centre of each web, which measure the relative displacements between pillars and tambour; eight livellometers and two piezometers, one near the web 4 and the other below the nave which register the variation of the underground water level. A linear regression analysis of the recorded data has shown that the major cracks are widening by approximately 3 mm (0.12 in) per century. Another source quotes a movement of 5.5mm.

Using software that had been used to model the structures of large dams, a computer model of the dome was developed in 1980 in a collaboration between Italian National Agency for Electric Power and Structural and Hydraulic Research Centre (CRIS) by a group of researchers led by Michele Fanelli and Gabriella Giuseppetti in cooperation with the Department of Civil Engineering of the University of Florence, under the supervision of Andrea Chiarugi. Because of limited computational resources and for reasons of symmetry, only a quarter of the dome was modelled. The resulting finite elements analysis confirmed that the main cracks were essentially being created by self-weight of the dome. Since then series of numerical models of increasing complexity have been developed. To assist in monitoring of the dome an extensive photogrammetric and topographical survey of the entire dome was commissioned in 1992 by the Soprintendenza. The results of this survey were then used to further develop the finite elements model of the dome.

== See also ==
- Late medieval domes
- Italian Gothic architecture
- List of Gothic Cathedrals in Europe
- List of largest domes
- List of tallest domes
- List of tallest structures built before the 20th century
- Roman Catholic Marian churches
- Santa Reparata, Florence
