= Francesco Talenti =

Italian sculptor

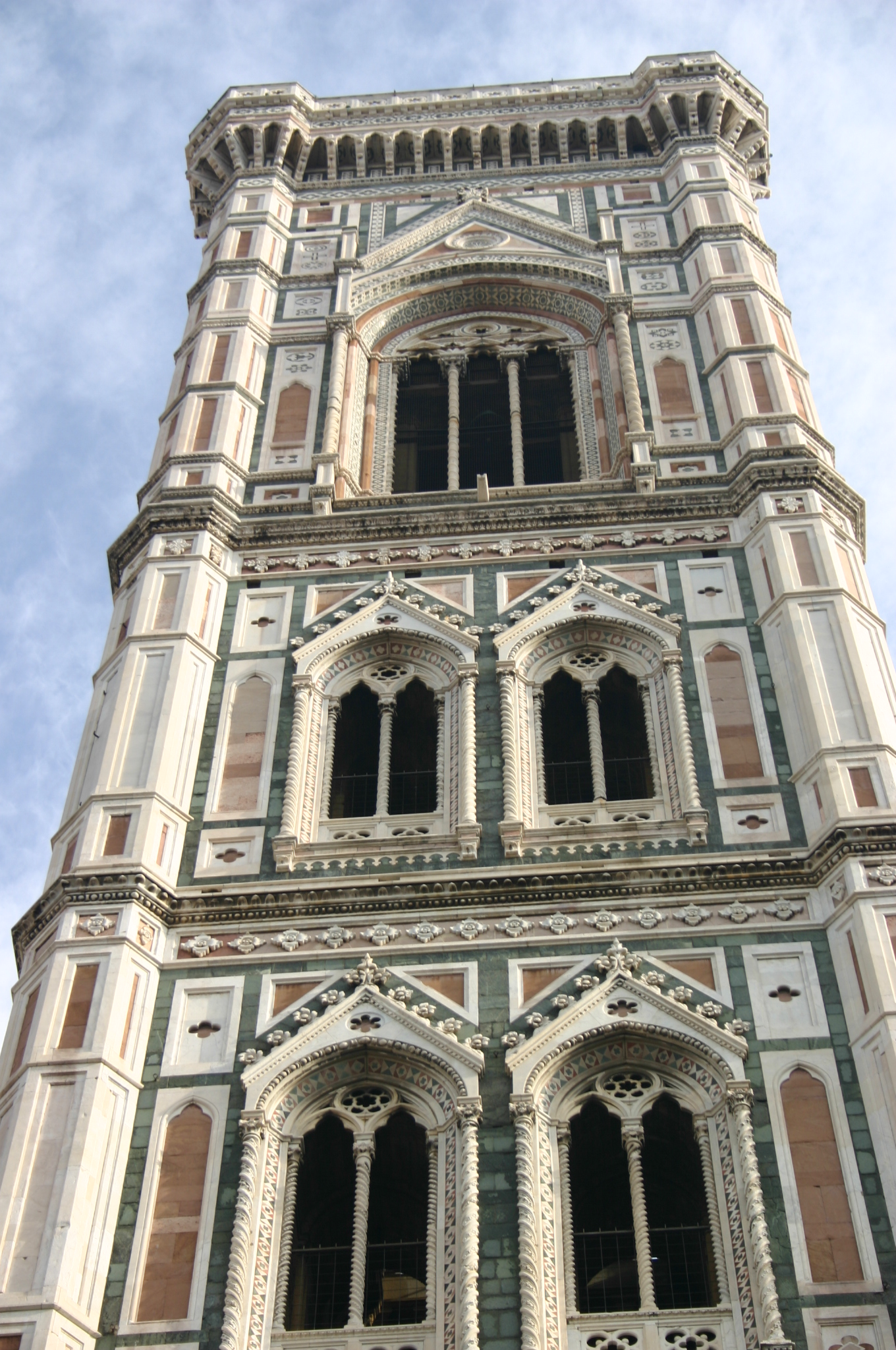
Talenti's work on the Campanile: the two middle storeys and the upper tower shaft

Francesco Talenti (c. 1300 – aft. 1369) was a Tuscan architect and sculptor who worked mainly in Florence after 1351. He is mentioned working at Orvieto Cathedral in 1325. In the 1350s he completed the two middle storeys of Giotto's Campanile, and two doorways, the Porta dei Cornacchini and the Porta del Campanile, respectively in the north and south sides of the Florentine Duomo. In 1351 he succeeded Andrea Pisano as director of works of the cathedral. The cathedral's famous dome is first mentioned in 1357, but opinions differ whether Talenti was responsible for its inclusion or not. Talenti enlarged its structure by redesigning the apses and prolonging the nave, making the church the largest ever built in Europe so far.
