= Palacio de la Ribera =

Coordinates: 41.6564°N 4.7349°W

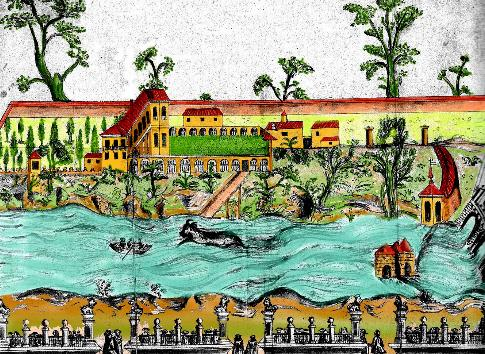
- Palacio de la Rivera. Drawing by Ventura Pérez (c. Early Modern ages)
- Interactive map of the Palacio de la Ribera area
- Alternative names: Palace of the Bank

General information
- Type: Palace
- Architectural style: Renaissance
- Location: Valladolid, Spain
- Construction started: 1602
- Completed: 1605
- Demolished: 1761

Design and construction
- Architects: Francisco de Mora; Diego de Praves
- Structural engineer: Bartolomé de la Calzada
- Civil engineer: Juan de Nates

The Palacio de la Ribera (also known as "Palace of the Bank") was the summer residence of Philip III in Valladolid. It was built in the 17th century (1602-1605) as part of a process of urban transformation upon the establishment of the Spanish Court in Valladolid between 1601 and 1606. The palace was situated at the Huerta del Rey neighborhood, located across the Parque de las Moreras on the right bank of the Pisuerga river. The palace grounds extended from the Puente Mayor to Ribera de Don Periáñez del Corral and delimited at both sides by the Pisuerga river and the Camino del Monasterio del Prado. The palace was gradually abandoned until it became part of the destroyed cultural heritage of Valladolid in 1761. Some ruins of the building are still preserved.

== Historical context and construction ==
The design, location, endowment, and agricultural and recreational roles of the palace were outlined according to the interests of Don Francisco Gómez de Sandoval y Rojas, Duke of Lerma. The Duke had succeeded in influencing Philip III to make Valladolid the capital of Habsburg Spain in 1601; a decision contrary to Philip II’s mandate years earlier. The Duke was the first to acquire the lands for the construction of the palace, which were originally known as Huerta del Duque (Orchard of the Duke) and known later as Huerta del Rey (Orchard of the King).

The construction of the new summer palace began in 1602 under the direction of Cuencan architect Francisco de Mora and the possible collaboration of Diego de Praves, Juan de Nates and Bartolomé de la Calzada. Other architects potentially involved were Juan Alonso Ballesteros, Bartolomé González, Antón de Huete and Juan Quijano. The goal was to build a counterpart to the Royal Palace of Valladolid in which official state affairs were carried out. Rather, the new palace would offer all the characteristics of a pleasure house for the king and his court, away from the urban bustle. Architect de Mora reconverted a simple country home into a luxurious haven of leisure and nature, in the manner of Italian Renaissance villas. The construction was finished in 1605, the year in which the crown prince Philip IV was born in Valladolid.

A manuscript written in 1626 by architect Juan Gómez de Mora, Francisco de Mora’s nephew and preserved at the Vatican Library tells about the palace:

"Has more the King in this city a country house called la Ribera, which is founded on the other side of the Pisuerga river. It has good gardens and boulevards. Kings used to come here to picnic and enjoy the river. It has within it a square for bull fights that in Court time, were seen some... ".

== Description ==
The Palacio de la Ribera was divided into two parts: one part facing north of the main pavilion, which was one of the sides of a closed courtyard with three arcaded galleries, and the other facing south, with a construction that formed an angle with the main pavilion and a garden decorated with parterres. There was a tower topped by a spire of lead at the intersection of the two buildings, with a view over the river and the gardens. The roof was decorated with red tiles. The main entrance of the palace opened onto the Paseo del Monasterio del Prado (current Salamanca avenue).

The palace, perpendicular to the river and on the classical style of the Habsburgs, was located on high grounds and safe from the dreaded flood of the channel. The southern facade of the palace had five doors and twenty large windows; there were thirty-four windows on the northern facade, and the side facing the river had three balconies. Inside the building, there was a hallway, an oratory, a main staircase, four rooms on the main floor, three more on the second floor along with other agencies and services. All the rooms had painted ceilings. One of the rooms was decorated with tiles and had a fountain.

The palace had two high galleries; one gallery faced a courtyard that was conditioned for bullfights. The other gallery had a view over the river from which naumachias (naval combats) and the famous "Despeño del toro" could be seen. The "Despeño del toro” was a popular feast in which the animal was thrown into the Pisuerga river by a greased ramp placed for this purpose and then speared from the gondolas to the delight of citizens massed on the other side of the river.

The palace had the first zoo of the city and housed lions, camels, deer, wild pigs, rabbits, bobcats, porcupines, herons, pheasants, turtle doves, and feathered birds. Part of the orchard was transformed into a hunting forest.

=== Painting collection and guests ===
According to the inventory of 15 November 1607 preserved in the Archivo General de Palacio in Madrid, the palace housed several masterpieces such as the collection of royal portraits of Pantoja de la Cruz and Rubens, paintings by the Carducci brothers, Andrea del Sarto, Veronese, Titian, Bassano, and even a work by Raphael. Rubens personally attended the celebrations of the palace in 1603 when he arrived at Valladolid as ambassador of the Duke of Mantua. During his stay of several months, he painted some portraits, such as the "Equestrian Portrait of the Duke of Lerma", now in the Museo del Prado, and works like "Heraclitus and Democritus" currently preserved at the Museo Nacional de San Gregorio. A later inventory made in 1703, identified 519 paintings, 70 Faenza ceramics and great and luxurious furniture pieces.

=== Gardens and sculptures ===
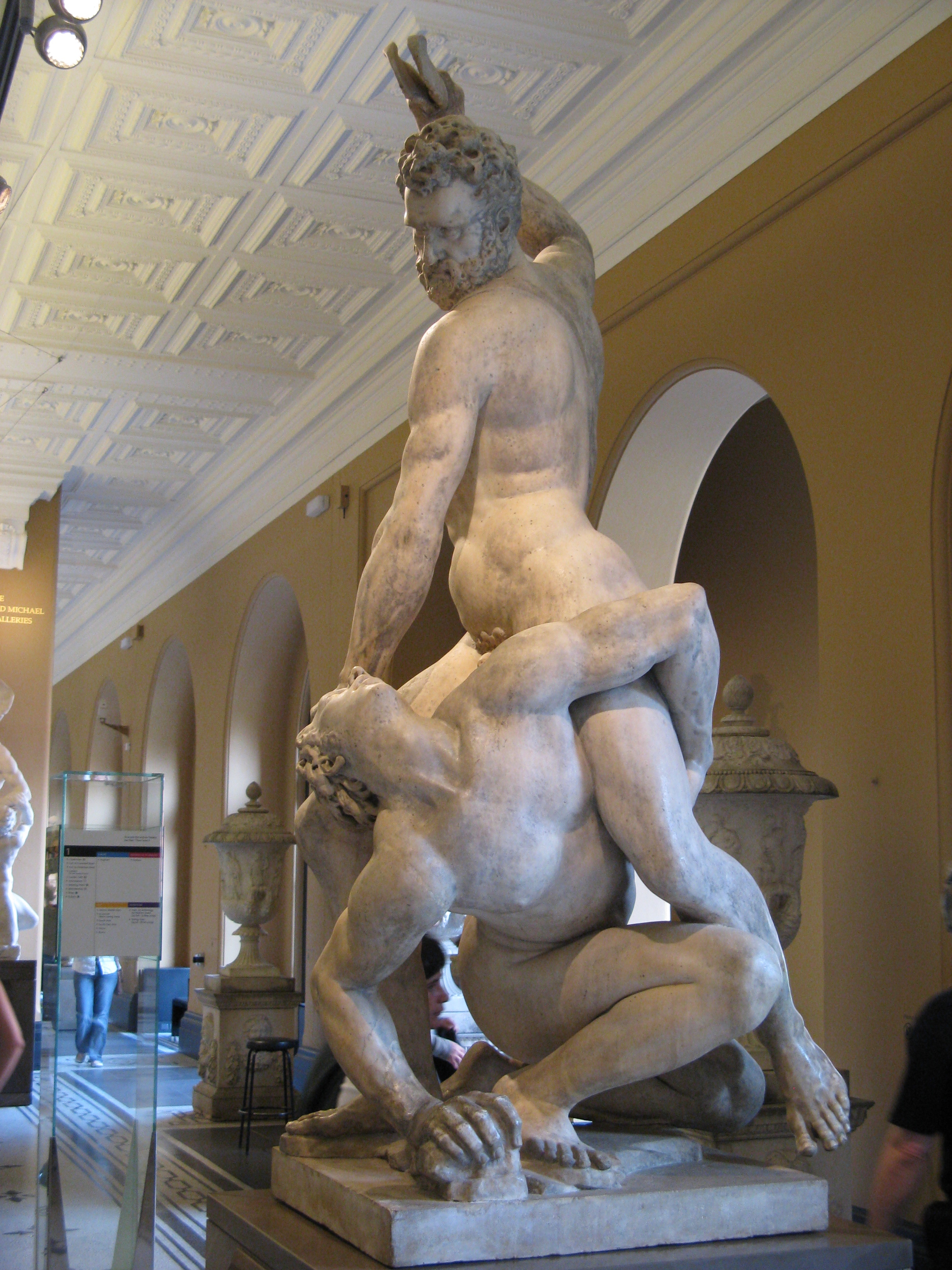
The Giambologna's Samson Slaying a Philistine formed part of the fountain that presided over the main garden.

Fountains and statues following an Italian late-Renaissance style were the visual axes of the garden walks. A large garden with many benches was designed at the south of the palace, hosting a collection of selected botanical species and a large aviary.

The masterpiece of these spaces was a fountain that presided over the main garden of Huerta del Rey (Orchard of the King). The fountain consisted of a pond and a large cup topped by the sculpture "Samson Slaying a Philistine", a masterpiece by Mannerist sculptor Giambologna. The sculpture came from the house of the ambassador of the Florence, from whom the Duke of Lerma bought it. In the year 1623, the sculpture would be gifted by Philip IV, along with a painting by Veronese to the Prince of Wales, the future Charles I of England. The sculpture is currently kept in the Victoria and Albert Museum in London and is one of the jewels of the museum. The cup of the fountain left in Valladolid in served as the basis for the Fountain of Bacchus, in the Island’s Garden of Aranjuez, where it remains today.

=== Access and river related ===
The Duke of Lerma ordered to build a secret passage to connect the Orchard of the King with the Royal Palace across the river by San Quirce street and alongside the Palacio de los Condes de Benavente. The duke copied the experience of architect Vasari in Florence in which a long passage connected the Palazzo degli Uffizi with the Palazzo Pitti on the other side of the Arno river. The chambers that accessed the passage from the Palacio de la Ribera, stored under lock 2,400 ordinary glasses and 205 crystal glasses that were supposed to be placed in the palace’s windows only when the kings were hosted in the palace.

Two piers in the river provided access to the palace by boat. A square wooden tower with a top room and windows covered by blinds made the functions of a large gazebo on the water level that was particularly attractive in the summer time. The Duke considered the chances of making the Pisuerga navigable to the Monastery of Prado and even planned to extend the navigation to Zamora; however, after the return of the Court to Madrid in 1606 these plans were forgotten.

A pumping water system was built near the Puente Mayor to bring water up from the Pisuerga to the gardens and crops of the Orchard of the King. The work was carried out by military sailor Pedro de Zubiaurre in collaboration with architect Diego de Praves. de Zubiaurre was not an engineer. While being imprisoned in the Tower of London for spying for Philip II in the English court, de Zubiaurre took note of the hydraulic system developed by Peter Morice to pump up water from the Thames into pipes for distribution to citizens’ houses in London. The complexity of this pumping water system, entirely new in Spain, was in the same line of engineering work that Cremonese Juanelo Turriano built for Charles V in Toledo on the Tagus river. The structure made of ferries wheels, arcades of distribution and lead pipes continued to work until 1618.

=== Galleys and gondolas in the Pisuerga river ===
A set of galleys and gondolas were used both to cross the Pisuerga river and for the shows during the festivities. One of these ships was the royal galley “San Felipe”, named in the king’s honor and painted in blue and gold tones by Santiago de las Cuevas in 1602. That same year, artist Bartolomeo Carducci painted two royal coat of arms in the pennants of a new gondola, while Santiago Remesal decorated the ship with banners, flags and pennants that included religious symbols, the royal emblems and the coat of arms of Valladolid.

== Destruction ==
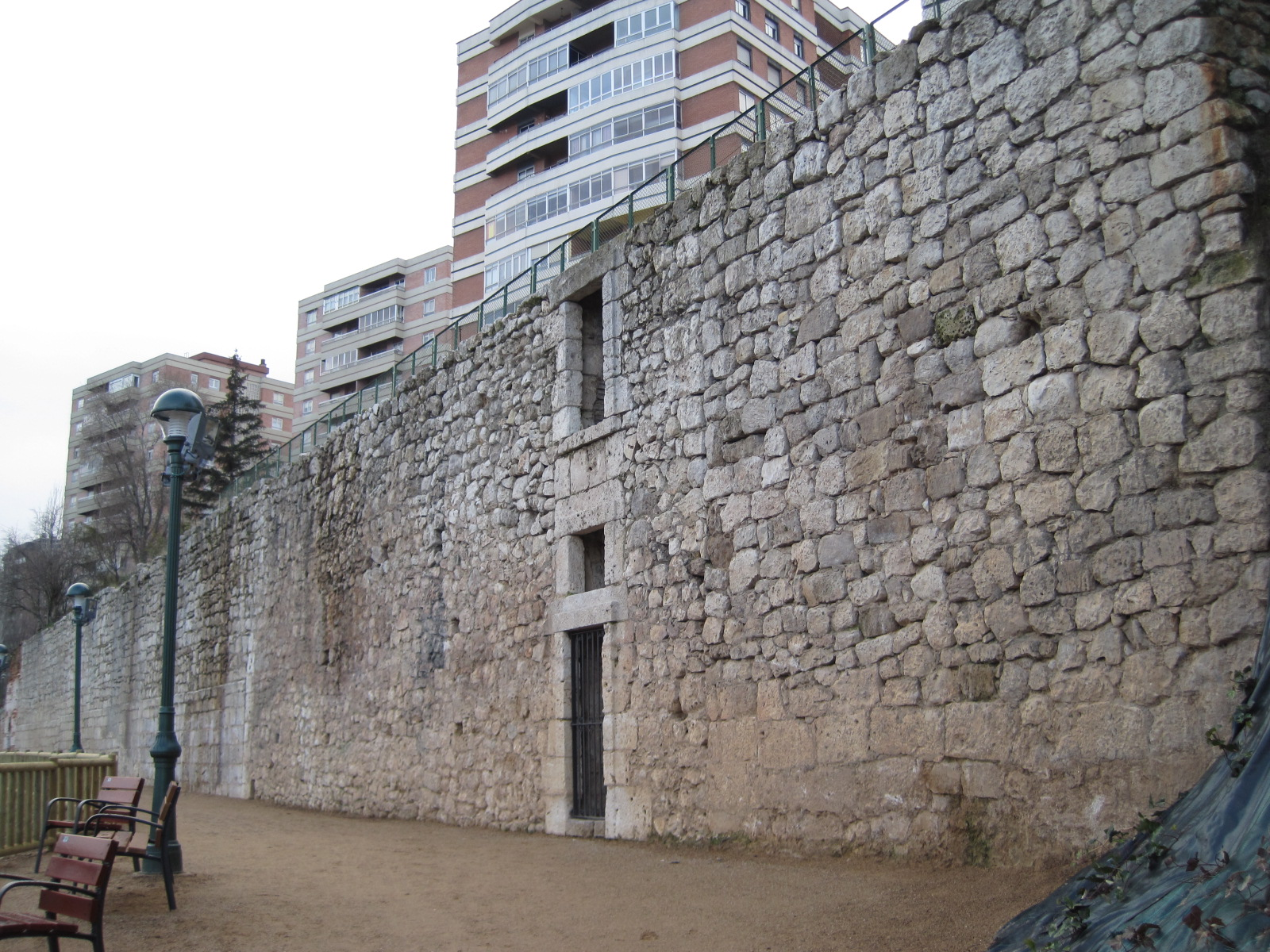
Remains of the wall of the palace.

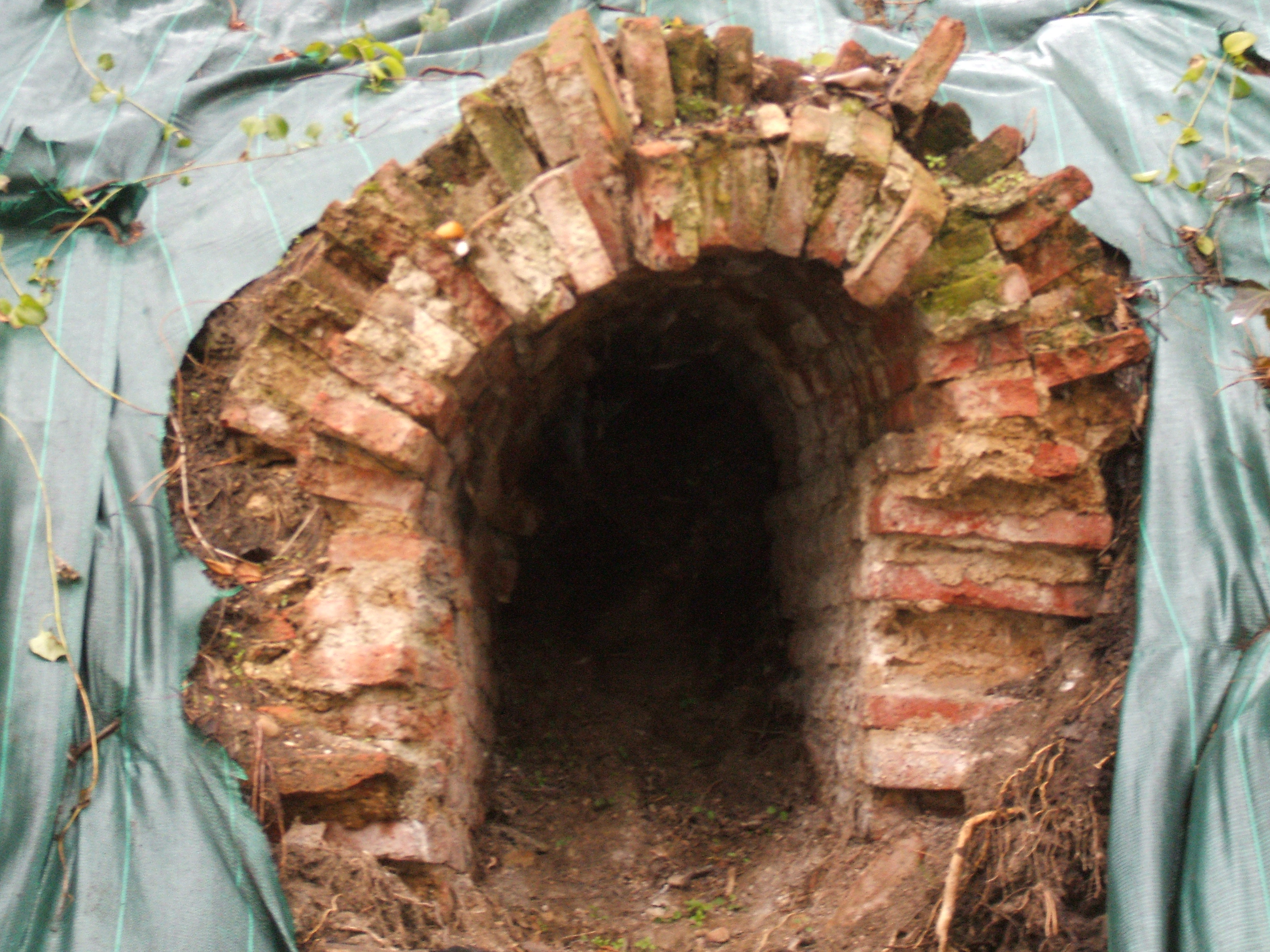
Remains of the Palacio de la Ribera.

The Crown lost interest in the palace over time, albeit carrying out small renovations for the visits of Philip IV in 1660, and Charles II in 1690. With the death of the childless Charles II in 1700 the succession of the throne passed to the Bourbon dynasty and the Palacio de la Ribera met its final decline. All its artworks were scattered between the Royal Palace of San Pablo in Valladolid and the Museo del Prado in Madrid. In 1761 and with the consent of the Bourbon king Charles III, architect Ventura Rodríguez advised its demolition. Some architectural elements of the palace were used to restore the Royal Palace in San Pablo Square and other buildings of Valladolid.

A door from the Huerta del Rey was transferred to the monastery of San Benito, now the Museo Patio Herreriano. The door was for many years one of the few tangible traces of this complex in Valladolid, whose remains disappeared completely in the middle of the 20th century. Nowadays, high residential towers rise on the palace grounds.

After debris removal and cleanup of the area near the Pisuerga river, the city hall has recovered two long walls of the foundations, one of stone and other of brick, which remained practically buried, as well as a small outbuilding that had remained lost for centuries. A small path along the river has been open to allow access to the remains of the sumptuous royal summer residence.

In June 2015 part of the slope overlooking the river was cleaned up to build a pier as a reminiscence of the original one.

== See also ==
- List of missing landmarks in Spain
