= Michelangelo (given name) =

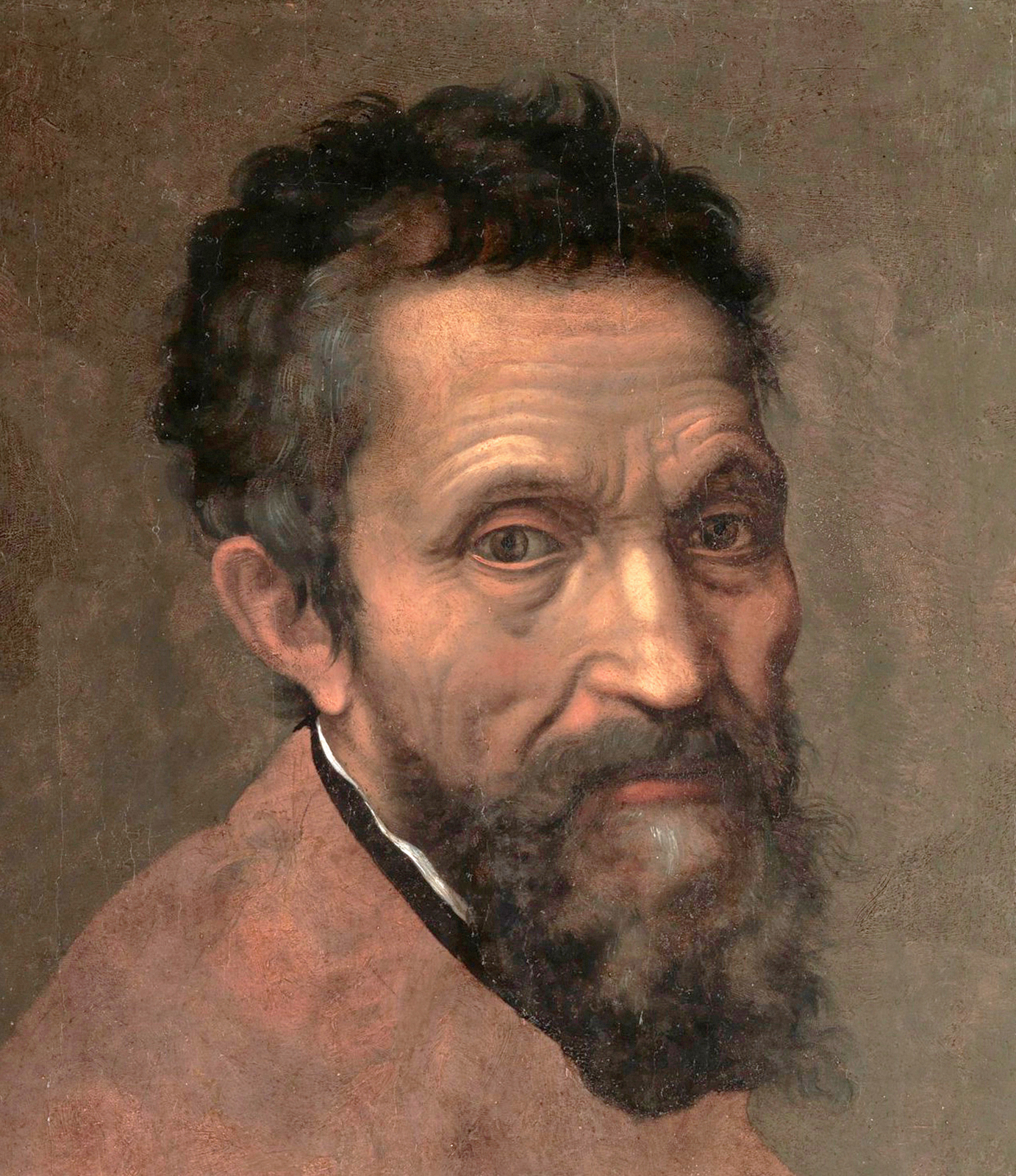
- Detail from a portrait of Michelangelo Buonarroti, attr. Daniele da Volterra
- Pronunciation: Italian: [mikeˈlandʒelo]
- Gender: Male
- Language: Italian

Origin
- Meaning: Michael the Archangel
- Region of origin: Italy

Other names
- Variant forms: Michael Angelo, Miguel Ángel
- Derived: Hebrew, Greek

Michelangelo is a given name of Italian origin that evokes Michael the Archangel and is ultimately a combination of the Hebrew name Michael ('Who is like God?') and the Italian name Angelo (messenger). The best known of that name is Michelangelo Buonarroti (1475–1564), the Tuscan sculptor, architect, painter, and poet.

== People with the given name ==
- Michelangelo Anselmi (c. 1492 – c. 1554), Italian painter in Parma
- Michelangelo Antonioni (1912–2007), Italian film director and writer
- Michael Angelo Batio (born 1956), rock guitarist from Chicago
- Michelangelo Buonarroti (1475-1564), Italian sculptor
- Michelangelo Buonarroti the Younger (1568-1646), Florentine poet and playwright, his grandnephew
- Michelangelo Carducci (fl. 1560s), Italian painter active in Umbria
- Michelangelo Fortuzzi (born 2001), German actor
- Michelagnolo Galilei (1575–1631), Italian lutanist and composer, younger brother of the astronomer
- Michelangelo Merisi da Caravaggio (1571–1610), Italian painter active in Rome, Naples, Malta and Sicily
- Michelangelo Messina, founder and artistic director of the Ischia Film Festival
- Michaelangelo Meucci (1840–1890), Italian painter
- Michelangelo Minieri (born 1981), Italian footballer
- Michael Angelo Pergolesi, 18th century Italian decorative artist in London
- Michelangelo Rossi (also Michel Angelo del Violino, ca. 1601/1602 – 1656) Italian composer
- Michelangelo Signorile (born 1960), American writer and talk show host

== Fictional characters with the given name ==
- Michelangelo, Teenage Mutant Ninja Turtles character

== See also ==
- Miguel Ángel (given name)
