= Carducci =

Carducci is an Italian surname. Notable people with the surname include:

- Bartolomeo Carducci (1560–1610), Florentine artist
- Giosuè Carducci (1835–1907), Italian poet
- Joe Carducci (born 1955), American writer and record producer
- Marco Carducci (born 1996), Canadian soccer player
- Michelangelo Carducci (16th century), Italian Renaissance painter
- Vincenzo Carducci (1576/78–1638), Florentine artist
