= Meucci =

Meucci is a surname of Italian origin that may refer to:

- Antonio Meucci (1808–1889), Italian-American inventor sometimes credited with invention of the telephone
- Attilio Meucci (born 1970), Italian mathematician and financial engineer
- Daniele Meucci (born 1985), Italian long-distance runner
- Michaelangelo Meucci (1840–1890), Italian painter
- Vincenzo Meucci (1694–1766), Italian late-Baroque painter

== See also ==
- Antonio Meucci (film)
- Garibaldi-Meucci Museum
