= Federico Zuccari =

Italian painter

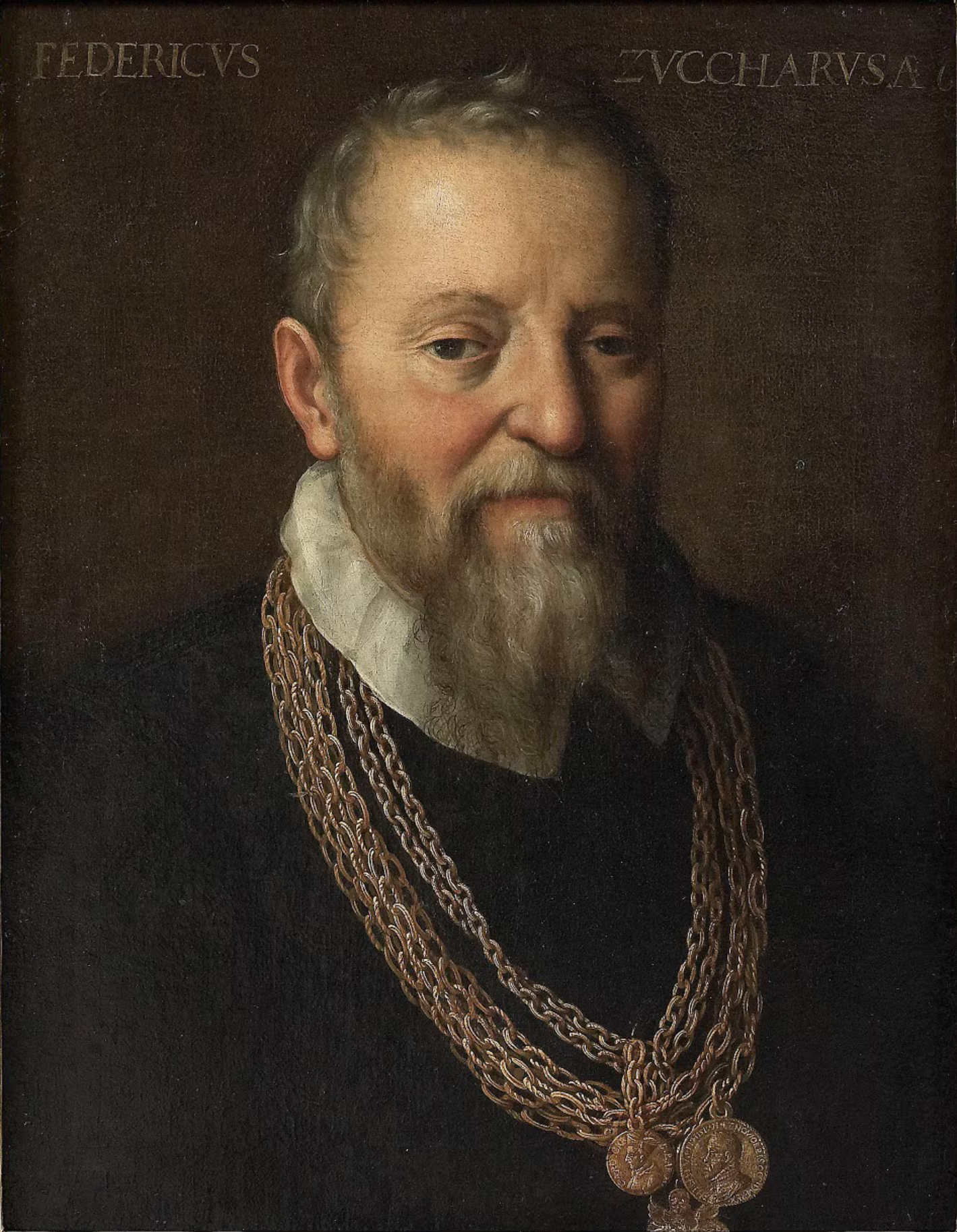
- Portrait of Federico Zuccaro by Fede Galizia, 1604
- Born: c. 1540/1541; Sant'Angelo in Vado, Papal States
- Died: July 20, 1609 or August 6, 1609 (sources vary) (aged 67–69); Ancona, Papal States
- Known for: Painting; architecture
- Movement: Renaissance; Mannerism

Federico Zuccaro, also known as Federico Zuccari and Federigo Zucchero (c. 1540/1541 – July/August 1609), was an Italian painter, draughtsman, architect and writer. He worked in various cities in Italy, as well as in other countries such as Spain, France, the Spanish Netherlands and England. He was an important representative of late Mannerism in Italian art.

== Life and work ==
Zuccaro was born in Sant'Angelo in Vado, near Urbino (Marche), then in the Duchy of Urbino. His parents were the painter Ottaviano de Zucharellis, who changed his surname to Zuccaro in 1569, and Antonia Neri. He was the third child of eight. His siblings were called Taddeo, Bartolomea, Federico, Iacopo, Lucio, Maurizio, Aloysio and Marco Antonio.

In 1550, when he was just 11 years old, his parents brought him to Rome to study law but Federico preferred a career in art. He trained and worked in the workshop of his elder brother Taddeo who had become a successful painter in Rome. He became quickly integrated into the team of his brother and assisted with the workshop's commissions. Around 1560 he was able to join a group of artists who worked for pope Pius IV at the Vatican where he made decorations for the Casino in the garden and the cycle with the History of Moses at the Belvedere which were commenced in 1560. He helped his brother on the fresco decorations at the Villa Farnese at Caprarola.

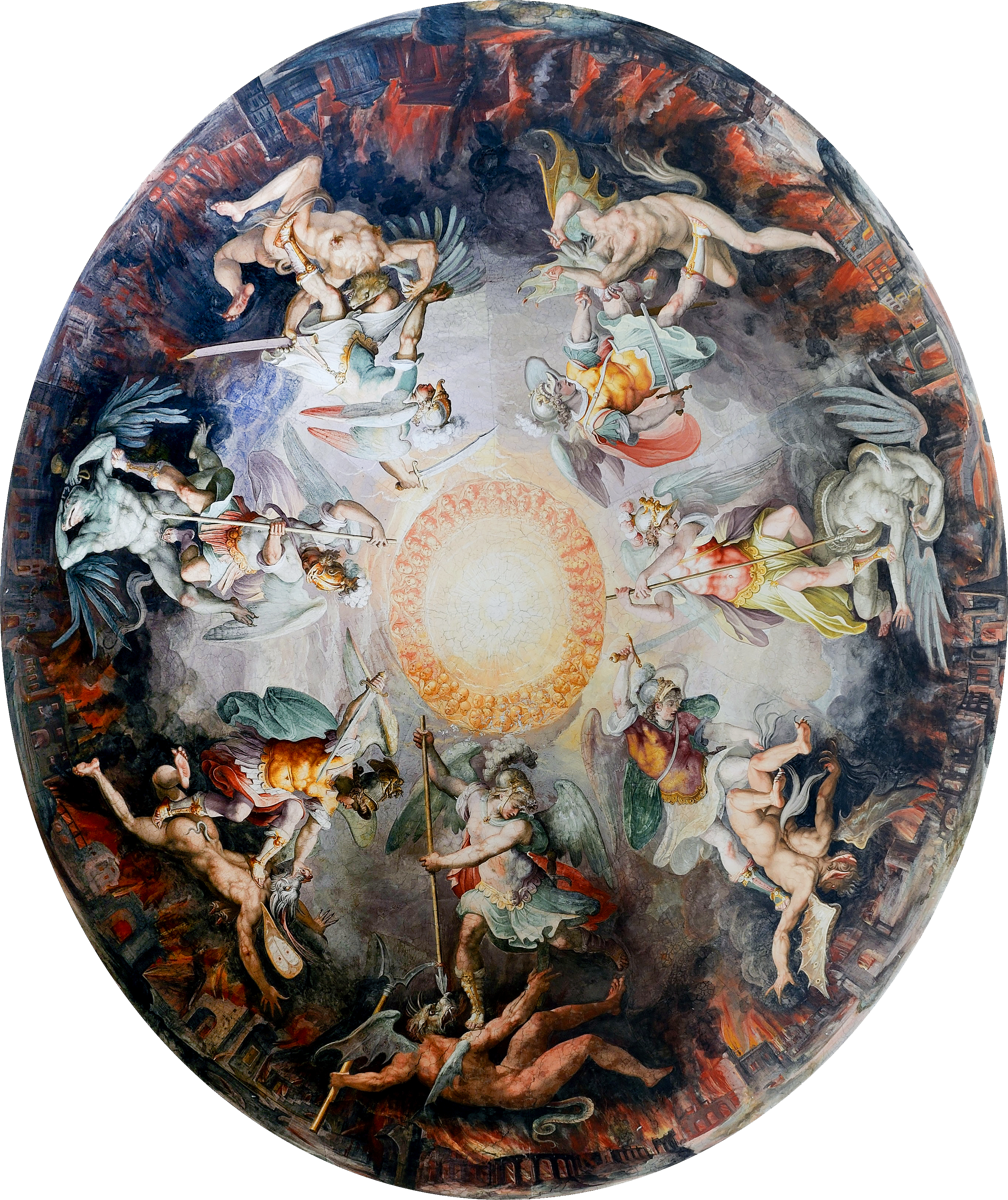
Angels Fighting Demons, Vatican, collaboration with Vasari

He left his work on this commission to travel to Venice to work for a private Venetian patron, Giovanni Grimani, the patriarch of Aquileia. He made decorations for the Palazzo Grimani di Santa Maria Formosa in Venice and painted frescoes and the altarpiece of the patriarch's chapel in San Francesco della Vigna. During this period in Venice, he met the prominent architect Palladio and the Florentine writer Anton Francesco Doni. They were active in various literary and artistic academies to which they introduced him. He collaborated with Palladio on the design of sets for the theater company Compagnia della Calza degli Accesi and in March 1565 they visited together Cividale del Friuli. He tried unsuccessfully to obtain the commissions for the decoration of the Scuola di San Rocco and the wall with the Paradise fresco in the Doge's Palace. He used his period in Venice to copy works of other masters of the 15th and 16th centuries, including some pages of the precious Grimani Breviary, a manuscript illumination produced by Flemish artists between 1515 and 1520.

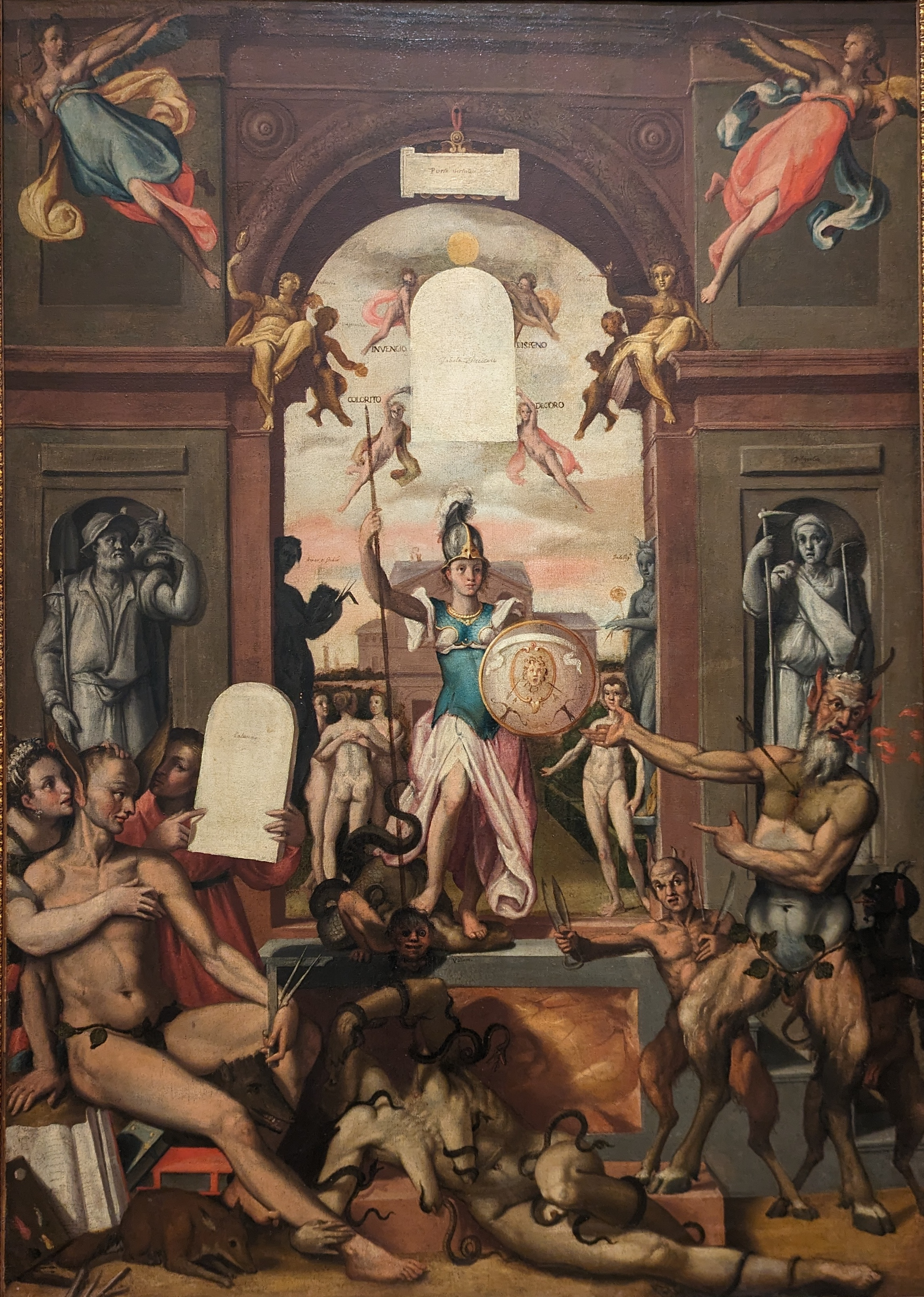
The Gate of Virtue

In 1565, Zuccaro left Venice and traveled to Florence where he had been introduced to some important people by his Florentine friends in Venice. He arrived not long before the elaborate wedding of the Grand Duke of Tuscany Francesco I de' Medici with Joanna of Austria in December 1565. Giorgio Vasari, who was in charge of the organisation of the artistic and decorative preparations for the festive occasion, entrusted him with the painting of some stories in grisaille. These served as decorations of the fake arch and the great drop scene that closed off one of the sides of the Sala dei Cinquecento in the Palazzo Vecchio, where the wedding was to take place. A preparatory sketch in colour depicting hunting scenes near Florence is the only item that survives in relation to his contribution.

After returning to Rome in 1566, he found artistic success with his Annunciation (lost) in the church of the Jesuits in Piazza del Collegio Romano and frescoes in the Villa d'Este at Tivoli. His brother Taddeo died suddenly, aged 37, on 2 September 1566. He took over all the ongoing commissions of his brother. This kept him busy for many years. He worked extensively on the fresco decorations at the Villa Farnese at Caprarola. In summer 1569, a conflict over payments arose between Zuccaro and Cardinal Farnese. As a result, Federico was sent away from Caprarola where he was replaced by Jacopo Bertoia of Parma. Upset by this event, Federico painted and then made copies of a satirical composition which was inspired by the lost painting of the ancient Greek painter Apelles called the Calumny of Apelles as described by the ancient author Lucian. In the painting Apelles had expressed his unhappiness with his ignorant patron King Midas. In his painting, Zuccaro depicts King Midas with donkey ears while the painter hero is led away under the protection of the Roman god Mercury. In this painting Zuccaro for the first time expressed his feeling of being misunderstood by an ignorant patron that would accompany him in the remainder of his career. In 1569, with Taddeo's team of assistants dispersed, Federico began to work mostly for the free market.

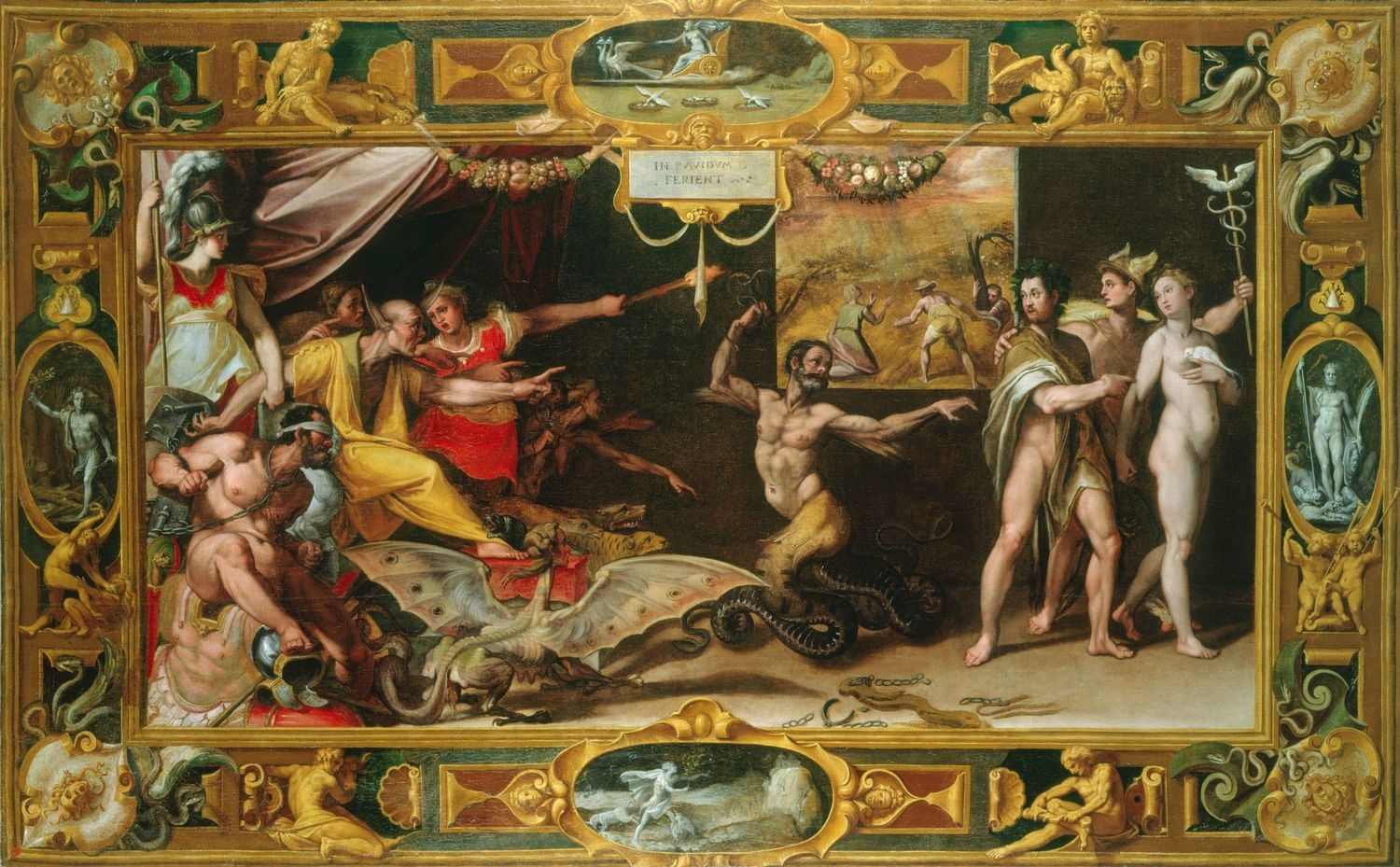
Calumny, c. 1570

On 22 June 1573, he set out for Paris after accepting to work in the service of Charles, Cardinal of Lorraine, a member of the powerful House of Guise. He arrived in Paris on 24 August 1573. He may have seen Leonardo da Vinci's Mona Lisa when he visited the Palace of Fontainebleau near Paris. From Paris he traveled on 14 August 1574 to Antwerp where he arrived six days later. He visited Brussels, where he prepared a series of cartoons for the tapestry-weavers. On 16 March 1575 he left Antwerp for England, where he stayed until 8 August 1575. In England he received a commission from Robert Dudley, 1st Earl of Leicester to portray himself and Queen Elizabeth I. Only the preparatory drawings for the two portraits are preserved. The drawings are inscribed with the date "1575" and "in london magio 1575." He also painted Mary, Queen of Scots, Sir Nicholas Bacon, Sir Francis Walsingham, Lord High Admiral Howard. Upon learning that the Grand Duke Francesco I de' Medici wished to commission him with the completion of the Last Judgement in the dome of Santa Maria del Fiore in Florence, left unfinished by Giorgio Vasari upon his death in 1574, he immediately decided to return to Italy. On his return trip, he stopped over in Antwerp from 18 to 30 August.

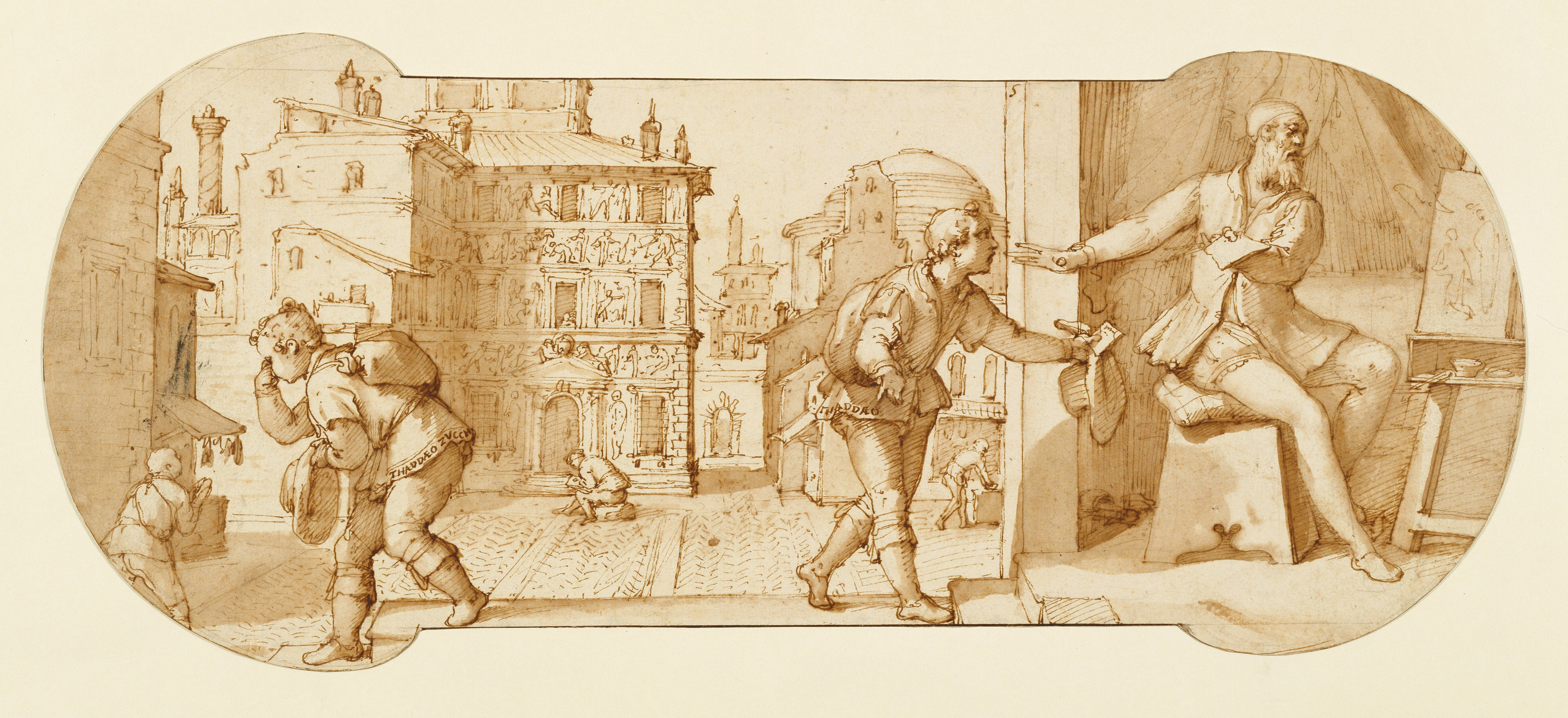
Taddeo Zuccaro Rebuffed by Francesco Il Sant'Angelo

In the execution of the Last Judgement in Florence he only relied in Vasari's general proportional scheme while creating his own original design by changing the manner of representation, technique and style. He painted a portrait of a Man with Two Dogs in the Pitti Palace (Florence), and the Dead Christ and Angels in the Galleria Borghese (Rome). In 1585, he accepted an offer by Philip II of Spain to decorate the new Escorial at a yearly salary of 2,000 crowns. He worked at the palace from January 1586 to end of 1588, when he returned to Rome. His paintings (like those of El Greco before him) were not in line with the austere artistic preferences of the king and many were painted over or heavily retouched after he left. However the parting was amicable: "We must not blame him, but those who sent him to us", said Philip. He was succeeded by Pellegrino Tibaldi. In Rome, he obtained a charter confirmed by Pope Sixtus V approving the establishment in 1595 of the Accademia di San Luca, of which he was the first president. Bartolomeo Carducci is said to have studied with him.

In 1603, he spent time in his birthplace Sant'Angelo in Vado, where he completed the Zuccari altarpiece at the monastery of Santa Caterina. He was in Venice, where he perfected the work in the Great Council room at the Doge Palace (signed, dated "1582 / PERFECIT AN. 1603" and bearing his emblem, a lily sugar loaf). He was given a gold necklace and the title of cavaliere knight as his reward for completing this work. From Venice he travelled to Pavia where, together with Cesare Nebbia, he frescoed the hall of the Collegio Borromeo, a work commissioned by Cardinal Federico Borromeo.

Zuccari travelled from one court to another. The last stages of his journey took him to Emilia and Romagna. Following a brief illness, he died in July or August 1609, in Ancona, in the home of a gentleman with whom he was staying and who arranged for his burial.

== Draughtsman ==
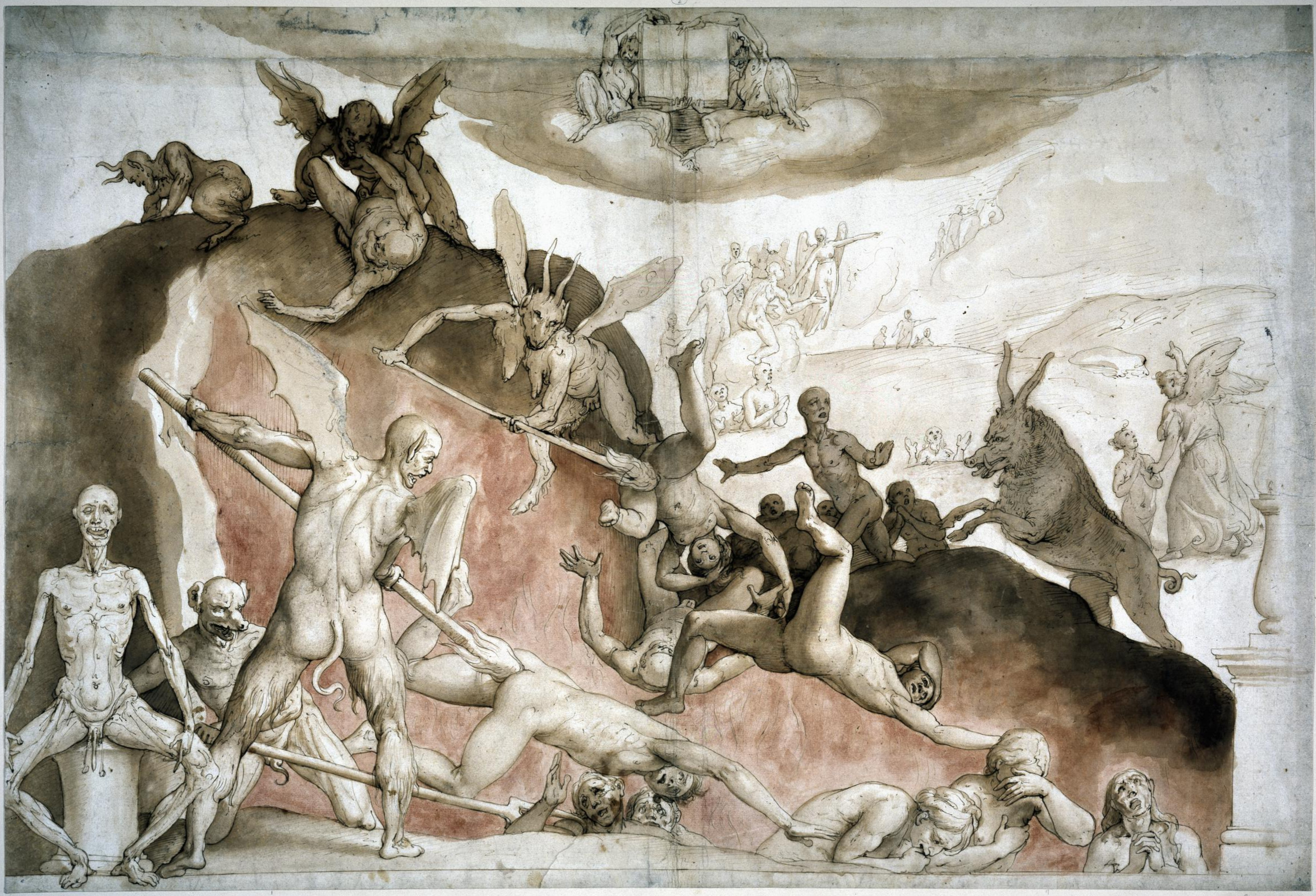
Harrowing of the Lustful

He was a prolific draughtsman and left a large number of preliminary studies for his paintings. He is the author of one of the most complete illustrations of the Divina Commedia of Dante which he created between 1586 and 1588 during his stay in Spain. The set of 88 sheets was kept by the artist throughout his life and were part of his estate at the time of his death. The sheets are now in the collection of the Uffizi in Florence.

He created around in 1595 a series of 20 drawings, which illustrate the early life of his older brother Taddeo, starting with the hardships and disappointments during the period of his training in Rome until his first artistic successes at the age of 18. In addition to 16 scenes depicting Taddeo's life, the series includes four drawings of allegorical Virtues flanking the Zuccaro emblem. The set is kept at the Getty Center.

== Art writer ==
Zuccaro also published books on art theory and art history. In his book L'idea de' Pittori, Scultori, ed Architetti (1607) he sets out a complex theoretical exposition on the idea of design.

== Selected fresco projects ==
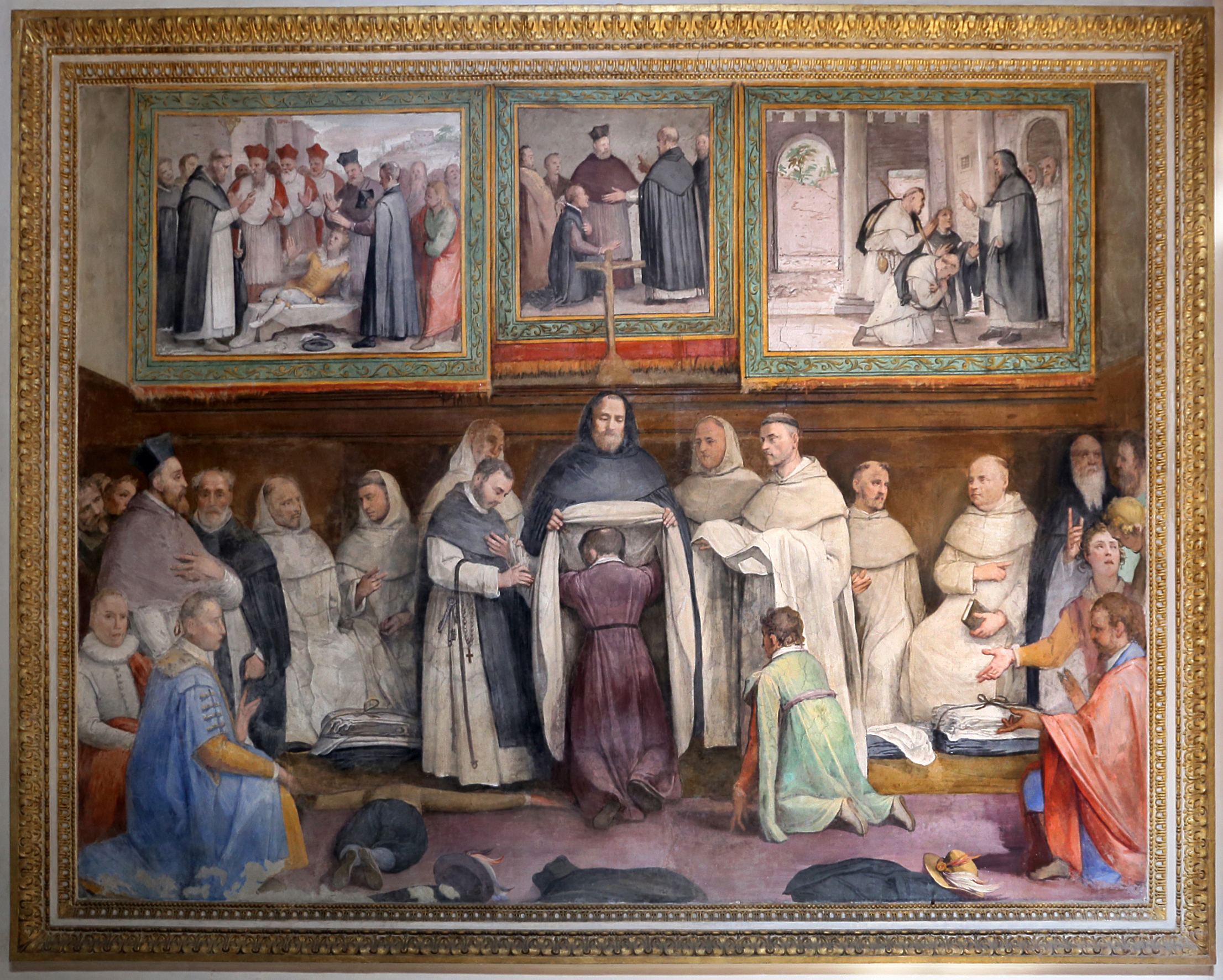
The ordination of St. Hyacinth, Basilica of Saint Sabina, Rome

The fresco projects he worked on include:

- Sala Regia in the Apostolic Palace, Rome
- Decoration of the Casina Pio IV, Rome
- Chapel of St. Hyacinth in the Basilica of Saint Sabina, Rome
- Grimani Chapel, San Francesco della Vigna, Venice
- Monumental staircase, Palazzo Grimani, Venice
- Pucci Chapel in the church of Trinità dei Monti, Rome
- San Marcello al Corso, Rome
- Cathedral of Orvieto (1570)
- Oratorio del Gonfalone, Rome (1573)
- The Last Judgement on the ceiling of the dome of the Florence Cathedral. Started by Giorgio Vasari and unfinished at the time of his death, it was completed by Zuccari between 1576 and 1579 with the assistance of Bartolomeo Carducci, Domenico Passignano and Stefano Pieri.

== Bibliography ==
- Donati Barcellona, Maria (1970). "Zuccari, Federico". Enciclopedia Dantesca. Istituto dell'Enciclopedia Italiana: Rome.
- Spagnolo, Maddalena (2020). "ZUCCARI, Federico". Dizionario Biografico degli Italiani (in Italian). Vol. 100: Vittorio Emanuele I–Zurlo. Rome: Istituto dell'Enciclopedia Italiana. ISBN 978-88-12-00032-6.
