= Francisco López (17th-century painter) =

Spanish painter

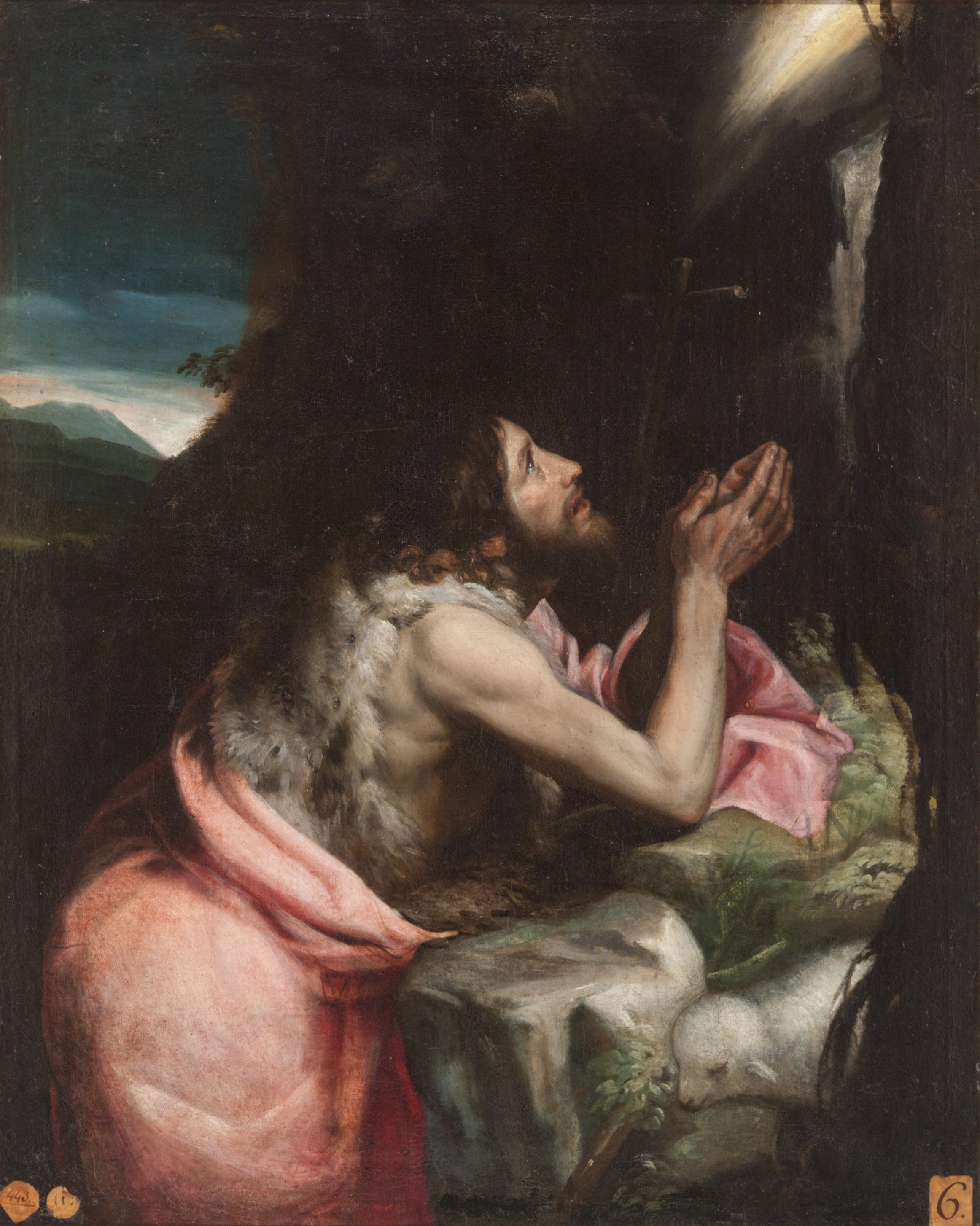
San Juan Bautista, oil on canvas, 107 x 86 cm, Madrid, Real Academia de Bellas Artes de San Fernando Museum.

Francisco López (1554 in Colmenar de Oreja near Madrid - 1629) was a Spanish painter and engraver. He was a pupil of Bartolommeo Carducci, whom he assisted in 1595 in painting for the church of San Felipe el Real at Madrid, destroyed by fire in 1718. He was appointed painter in ordinary to King Philip III of Spain. In 1603, he painted a series of paintings representing the victories of Charles V in the King's dressing-room at the Pardo Palace. He also etched the third, sixth, and seventh plates for Vincenzo Carducci's Dialogues on Painting. He also painted Saint John the Baptist (107 x 86 cm) which is now at the Real Academia de Bellas Artes de San Fernando.
