= Samson Slaying a Philistine =

Sculpture by Giambologna (c. 1562)

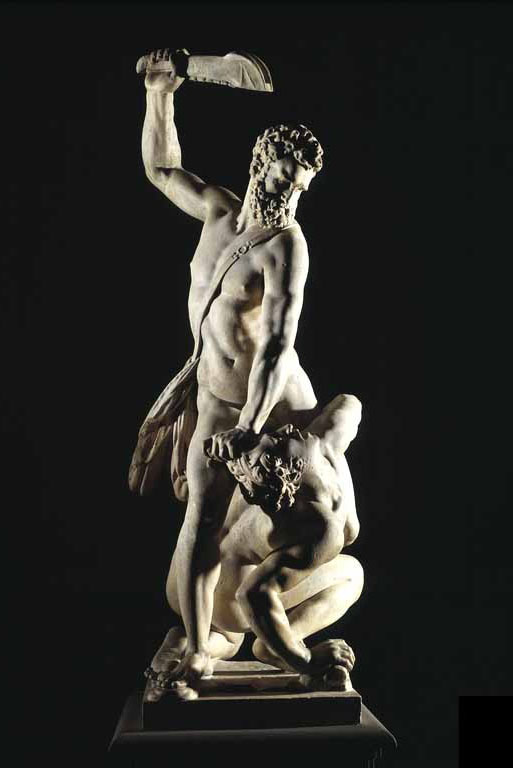
- Artist: Giambologna
- Year: c. 1562
- Medium: Marble
- Location: Victoria and Albert Museum, London
- Accession: A.7-1954

Samson Slaying a Philistine is a marble sculpture created around 1562 by Giambologna. Originally commissioned by Francesco de' Medici for a fountain in Florence, this sculpture was later gifted to Spain's Duke of Lerma and displayed in the gardens of the Palacio de la Ribera, Valladolid.

The statue was the earliest of his marble groups from the sculptor to the Medici Grand Dukes of Tuscany, and the only substantial work by the artist to have left Italy. The original can be seen today at the Victoria and Albert Museum; it has been copied for several private gardens in England.

== History ==
The piece was commissioned by Francesco de' Medici for a fountain in Florence, and was sculpted around 1562. It was intended for the Villa di Castello, a Medici villa outside Florence that featured elaborate gardens similar to those of the Boboli Gardens. In 1601, Ferdinando I de' Medici gifted the statue to the Duke of Lerma, where it was displayed in the gardens of the Palacio de la Ribera in Valladolid. In 1623, the statue was sent to England as a gift to King Charles I. The sculpture was then passed on to George Villiers, 1st Duke of Buckingham.

Buckingham placed the statue in his collection at York House in London, where it became one of the most famous sculptures in England. In the 18th century, it was misidentified as Cain and Abel. The statue was then placed in Hovingham Hall in Yorkshire before being acquired by the Victoria and Albert Museum in 1954, where it remains today.

== Interpretation ==
The sculpture depicts Samson, a judge of Israel, slaying a Philistine soldier with the jawbone of a donkey, an act interpreted as a metaphor for political dominance, where Samson represents the righteous use of power and the Philistine represents forces of chaos.

The sculpture showns the moment before the fatal blow is dealt to the Philistine. The artistic style figura serpentinata is used to create the twisting bodies.

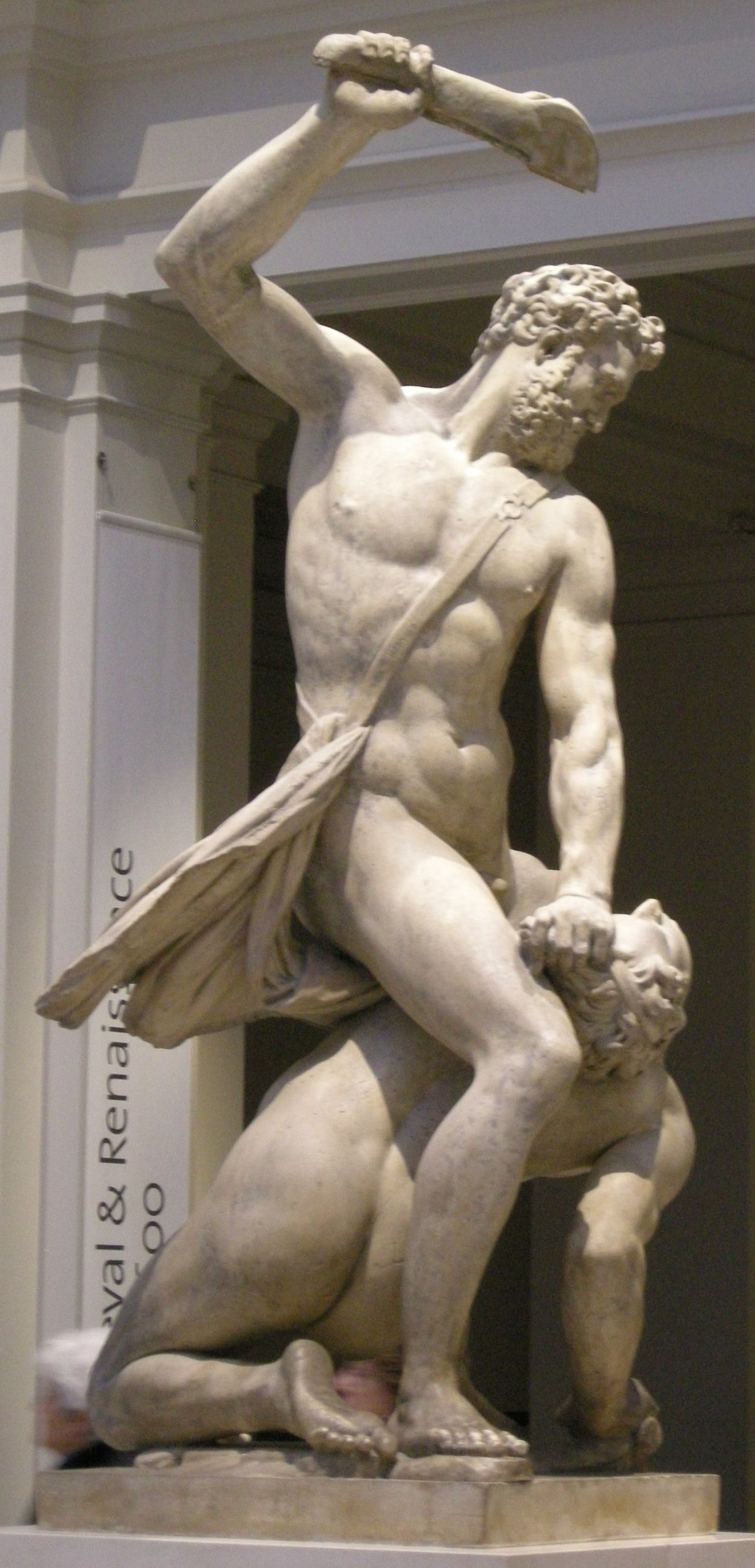

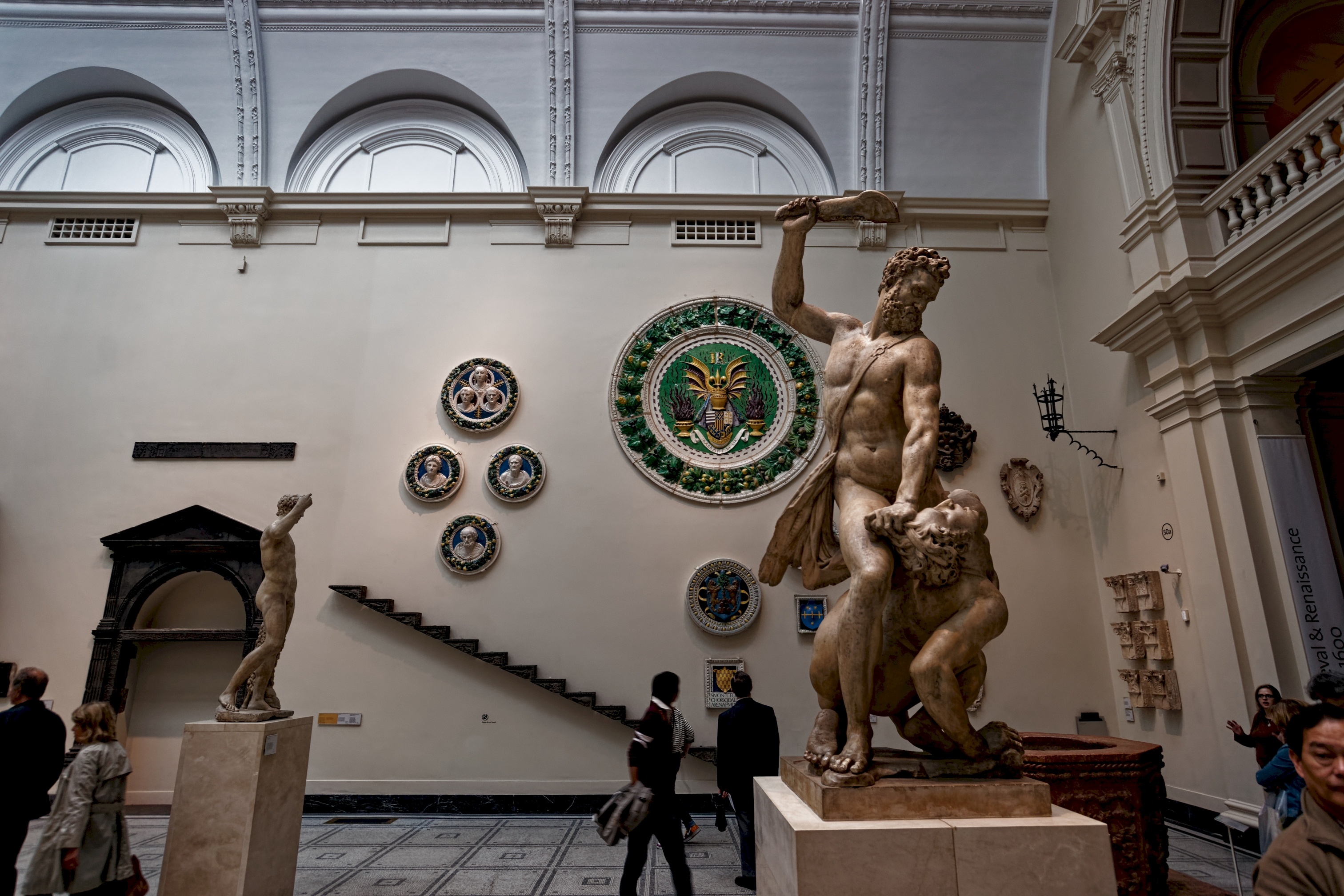

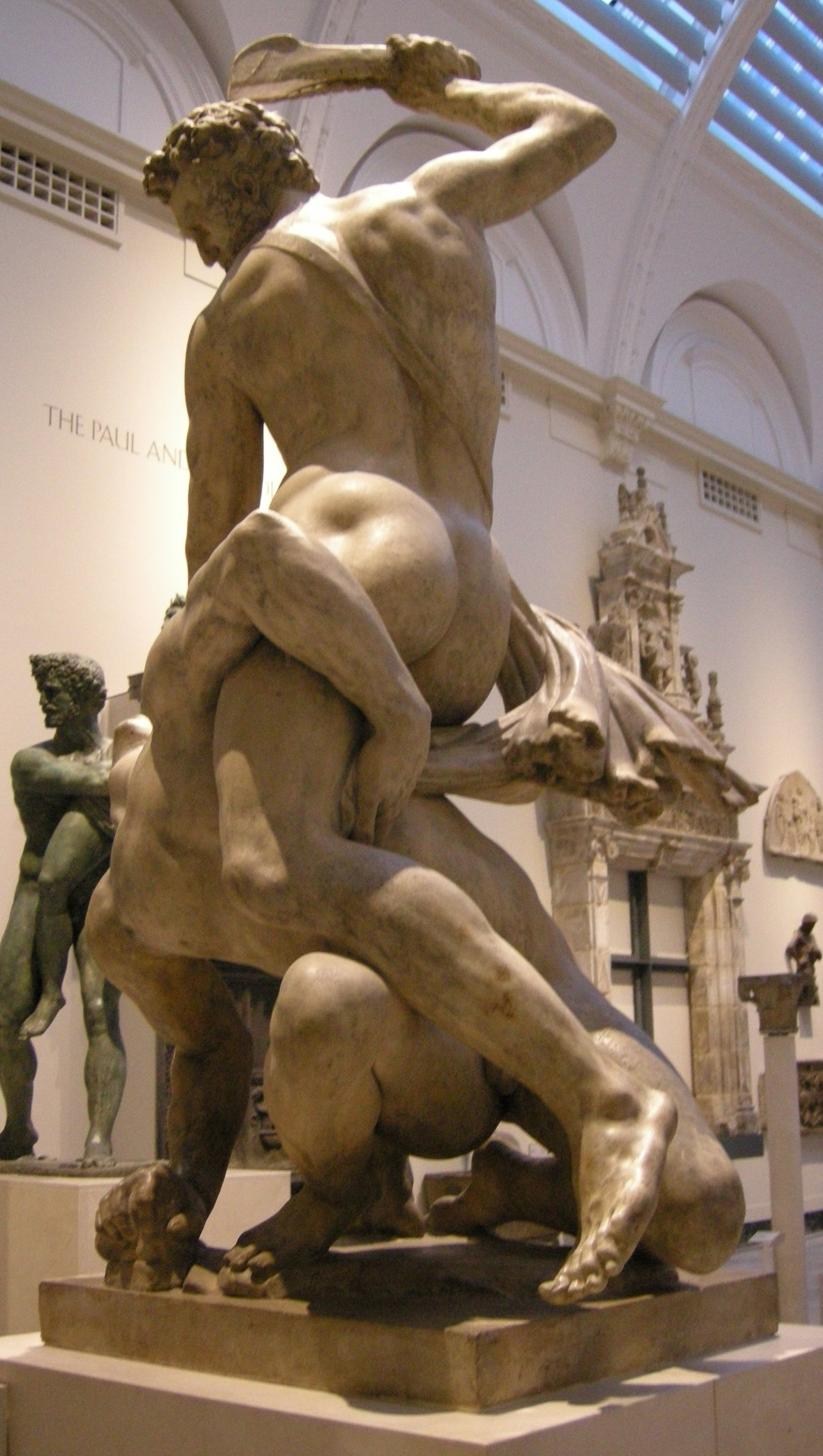

== See also ==
- Palacio de la Ribera

== Bibliography ==
- Jackson, Anna, ed. (2001). V&A: A Hundred Highlights. V&A Publications.
