= Stefano Pieri =

Italian painter (1544–1629)

- Born: December 26, 1544; Florence, Republic of Florence
- Died: January 13, 1629 (aged 84); Florence, Republic of Florence
- Resting place: Ognissanti, Florence
- Known for: The Sacrifice of Isaac and Pieta (Galleria dell'Accademia)
- Movement: Renaissance

Stefano Pieri (December 26, 1544 – January 13, 1629) was an early 17th-century Florentine painter.

Baptismal documents discovered in 2017 revealed that Pieri was born to Piero Pieri-Rossi, a descendent of Parma's nobility working as a guard of the Florence Customs House, and living in the neighborhood of San Jacopo sopr'Arno.

He trained under Agnolo Bronzino before approaching Giorgio Vasari and enrolling at the Accademia del Diseno on 16 July 1564. In that year, he participated with many other young artists in the funeral of Michelangelo; works of art from that event remain in many Florentine galleries today. His painting of Michelangelo beside Duke Cosimo de' Medici gained special praise from Vasari. He assisted Vasari in painting the monumental Last Judgement on the cupola of the Florence Cathedral in the late 1570s.

He later followed Federico Zuccari to Rome to aid in the interior decoration of the Villa d'Este. According to Giovanni Baglione, he participated in numerous other projects in small churches that are now mostly lost or in disrepair, including damaged frescoes in Santa Prassede and San Giovanni dei Fiorentini (overshadowed by those of Cortona).

Attribution of many of his works is uncertain, but his catalog is anchored by two works in Florence's Galleria dell'Accademia: the Sacrifice of Isaac (1585) and Pietà (1587, second copy in the Fine Arts Museum of Chambery). These allowed his identification as the artist of the Flagellation in the baptistry of St John's Co-Cathedral, Valletta; Holy Family with St. John sold at Christie's in 1996 and a similar work in the Civic Museum of Prato; the altarpiece of Santa Maria della Neve in the Monastero delle Murate (faded following the 1966 flood of the Arno); and the Madonna in Glory on the main altar of Badia a Pacciana in Pistoia. These add to recognized works like the Allegory of Prudence in the Uffizi, Annunciation in Santa Prassede of Rome, and the Baptism of Constantine in the church of Santa Croce in Bosco Marengo.

He died in 1629, and was buried in Ognissanti, Florence.

== Selected works ==
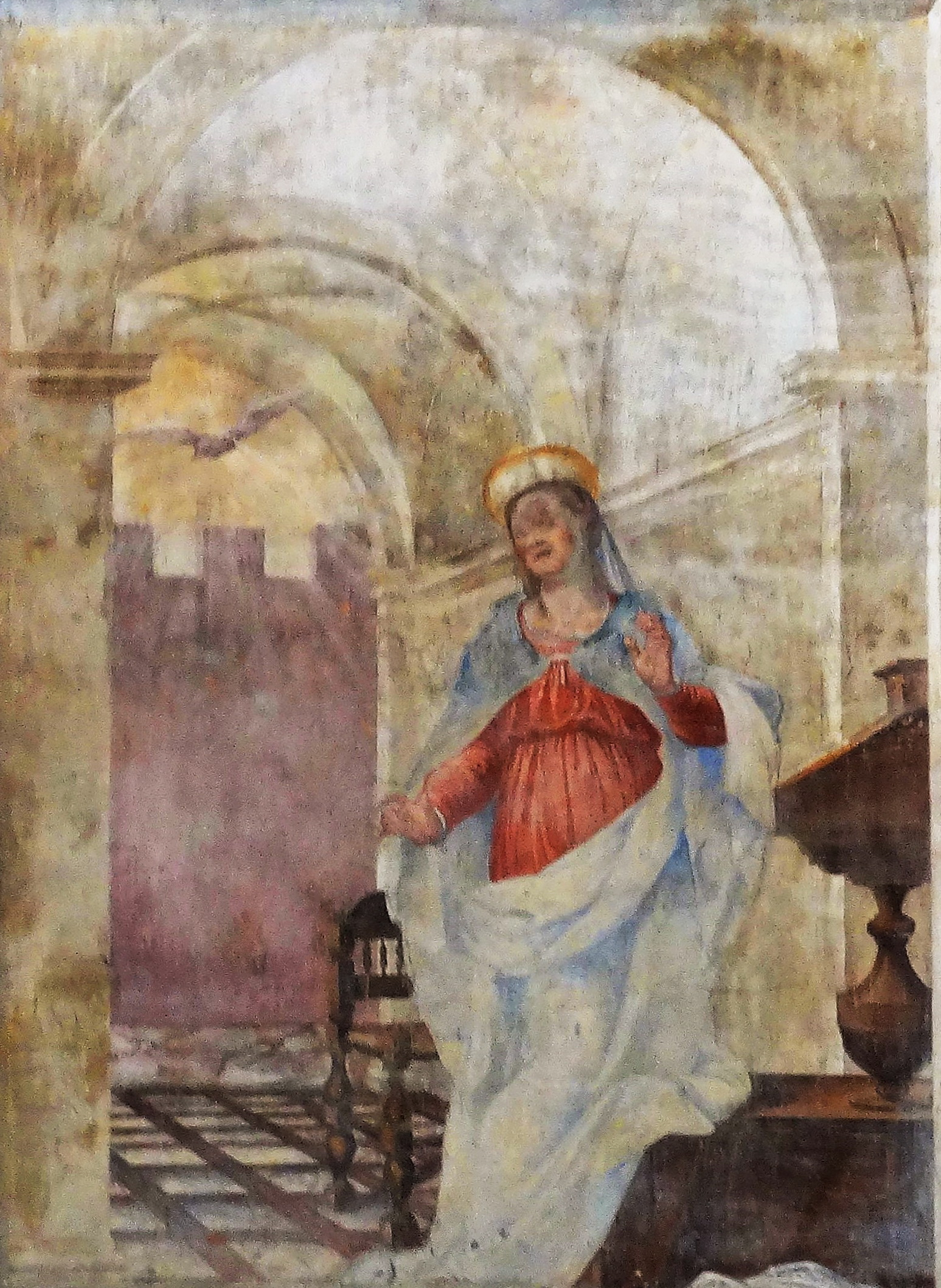
Annunciation (detail of Mary), Santa Prassede

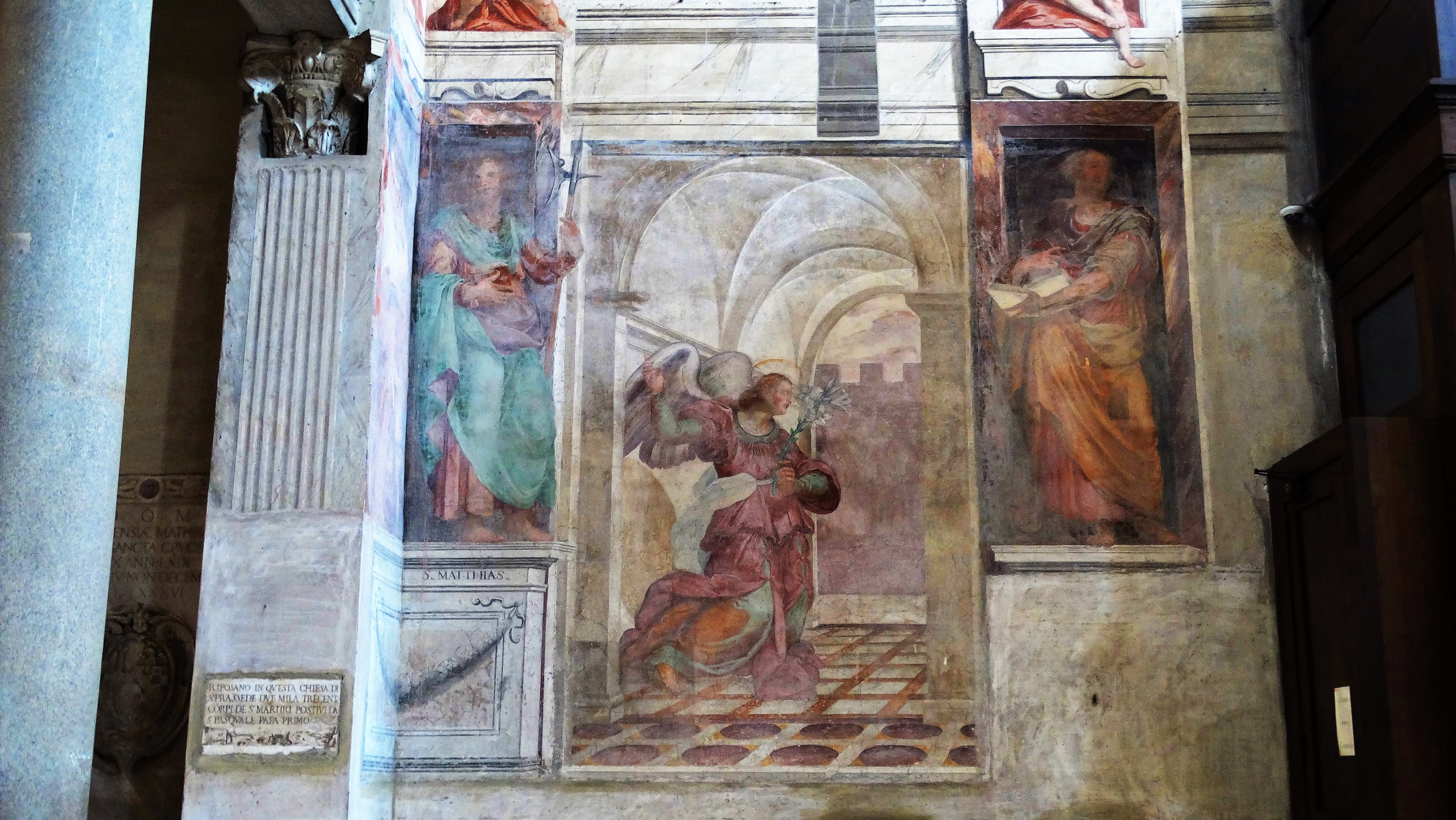
Annunciation (angel side), Santa Prassede

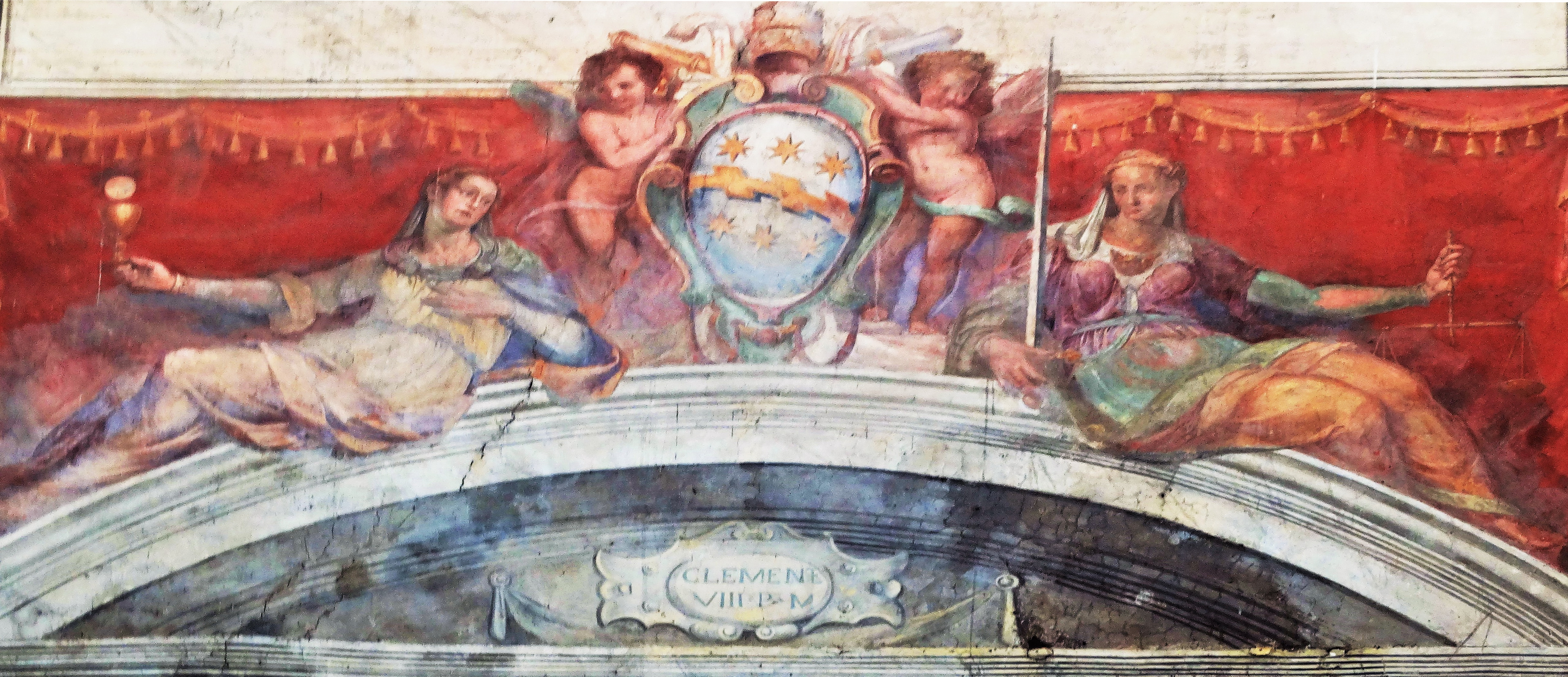
Faith and Justice, Santa Prassede

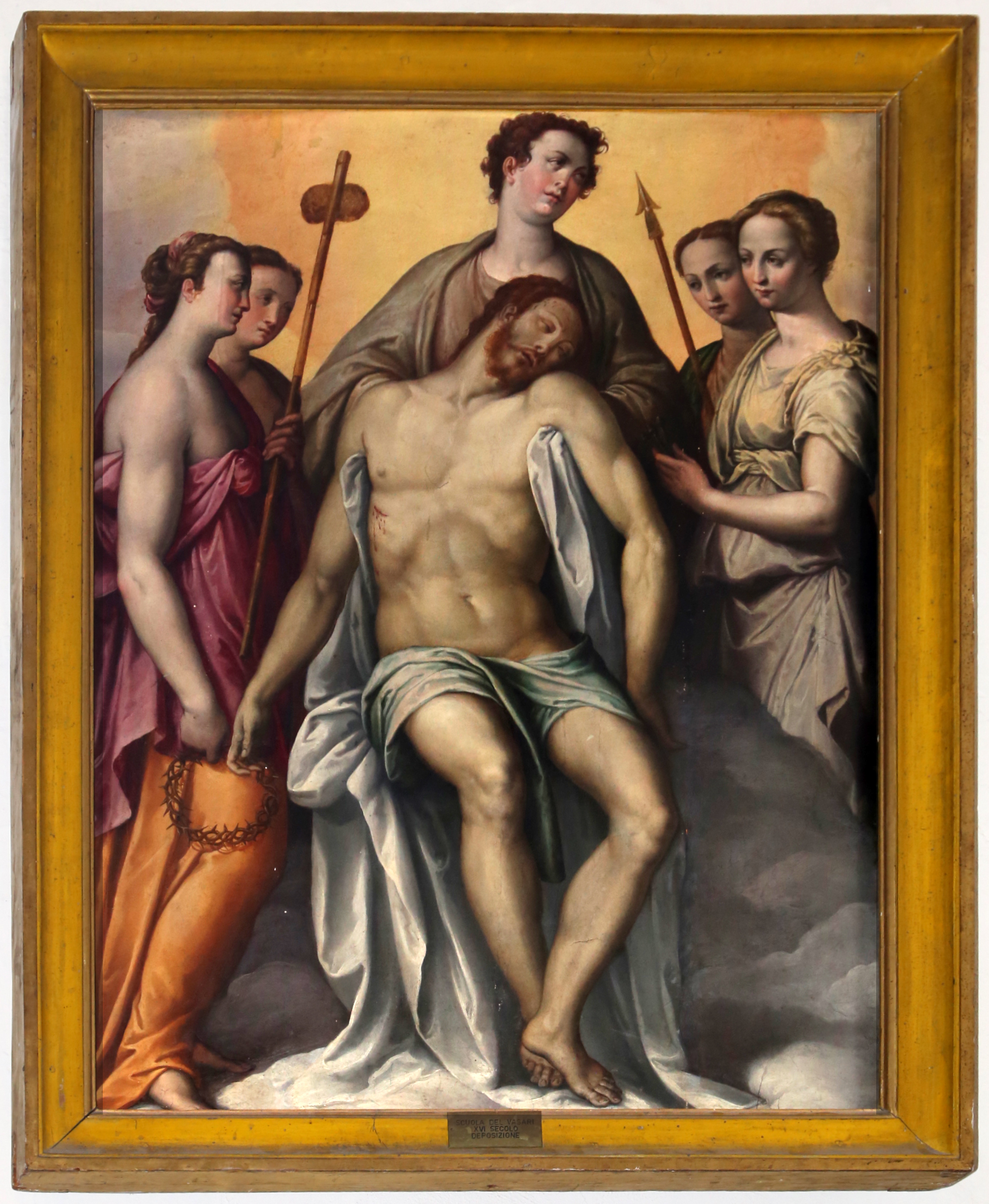
Pietà, San Marcello in Pistoia

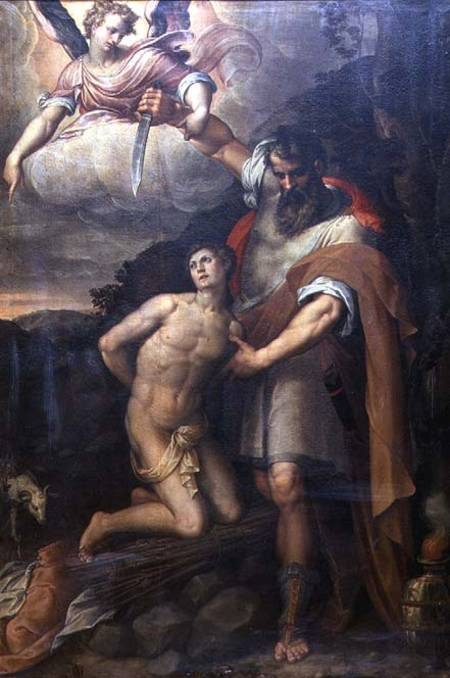
The Sacrifice of Isaac, 1585, Galleria dell'Accademia

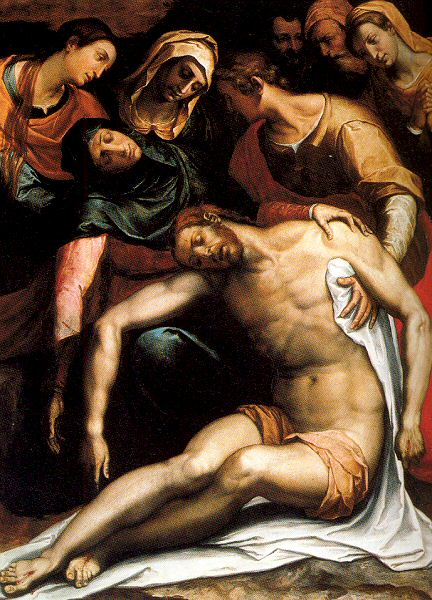
Pietà, 1587, Galleria dell'Accademia
