= The Last Judgement (Vasari and Zuccari) =

Fresco in the dome of Florence Cathedral

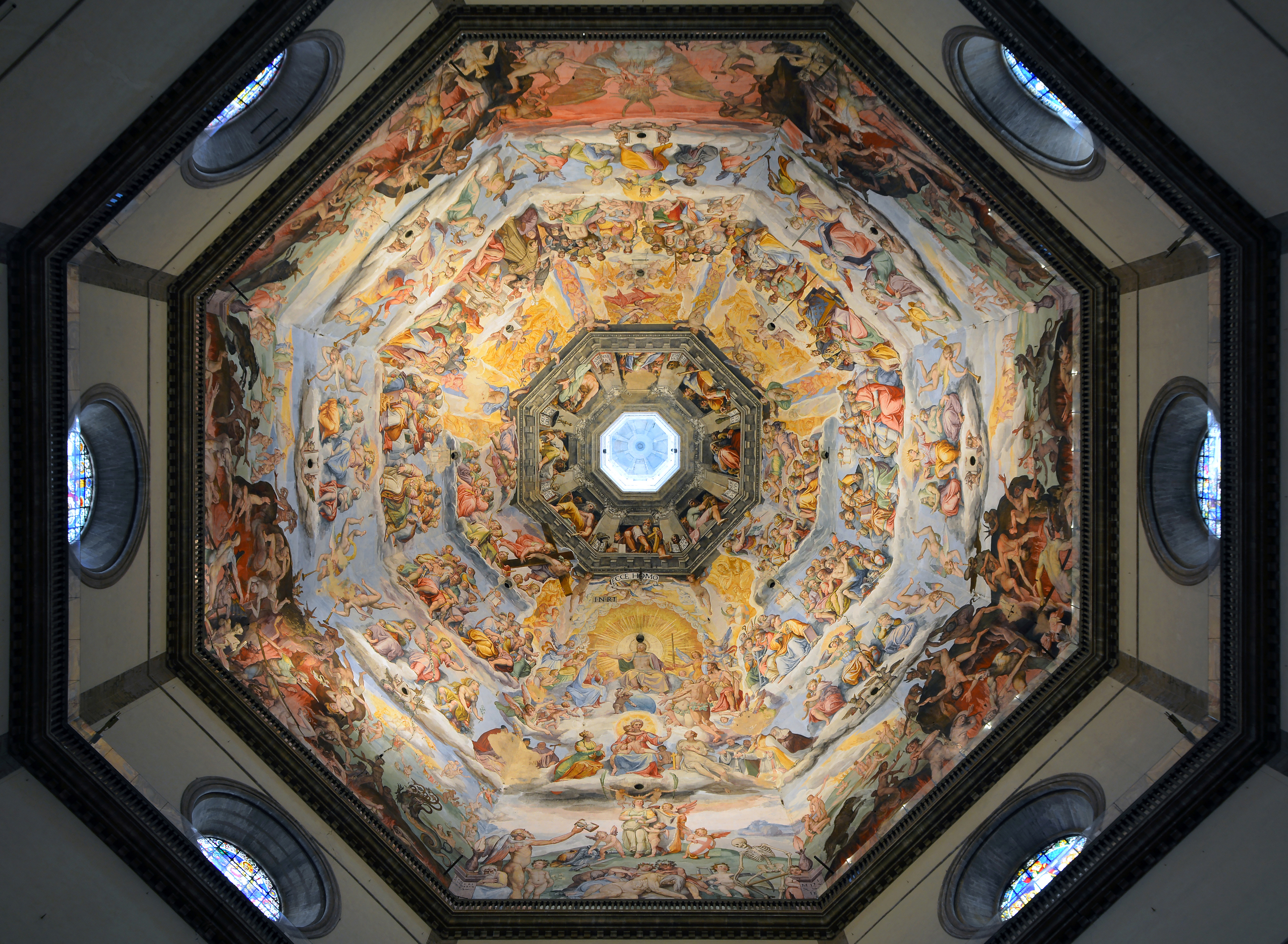
- The Last Judgement
- Artist: Giorgio Vasari, Federico Zuccari
- Year: 1572-1579
- Medium: Fresco
- Location: Cattedrale di Santa Maria del Fiore, Florence

The Last Judgment in the Cattedrale di Santa Maria del Fiore, in Florence, Italy is a fresco painting which was begun by the Italian Renaissance master Giorgio Vasari in 1572 and completed after his death by Federico Zuccari, in 1579. Initially commissioned by Grand Duke Cosimo I de' Medici, it is located on the ceiling of the dome of the cathedral. It was the subject of an extensive restoration undertaken between 1989 and 1994.

== History ==
As the dome of the Cattedrale di Santa Maria del Fiore in Florence approached completion there were number of suggestions as to how to decorate its ceiling. One was that it should be covered with a mosaic decoration to make the most of the available light coming through the circular windows of the drum and through the lantern. However, there was little existing experience with mosaic and it was considered extremely expensive. There was also concern at the time as to what impact their weight would have on the dome, which does not seem very important today, given the enormous weight of the dome. The domes architect Filippo Brunelleschi had proposed that the ceiling be covered with gold, but his death in April 1446 put an end to this idea. In the end the ceiling was simply whitewashed.

The dome remained unadorned until Grand Duke Cosimo I de' Medici, in response to the religious Council of Trent and the resulting Counter-Reformation, decided in 1568 to commission the decoration of the ceiling as a means of not only advertising his role as a Christian ruler and promoter of religious art in Florence but also of displaying his support for the new religious order and the Pope. Cosimo tasked his court painter Giorgio Vasari and his literary and theological adviser the learned Benedictine cleric Vincenzo Borghini to compose a suitable decoration. Most probably inspired by Michelangelo's work on the ceiling of the Sistine Chapel Vasari suggested the theme of The Last Judgment. An extensive consultation took place between Vasari and Borghini and between Vasari and the eminent humanist Cosimo Bartoli on the project.

Borghini's eventual iconographic design which took inspiration from the Book of Revelation along with Dante's Divine Comedy called for the walls of the vault to be painted in concentric circles, with the upper areas featuring Christ, the Madonna and the angels, which would symbolize the redemption of man's spirit as it strove toward heaven. The lowest circle would feature eternal torment to depict man's descent into the horrors of the underworld. In response Vasari with input from Borghini completed numerous drawings to visualize the design.

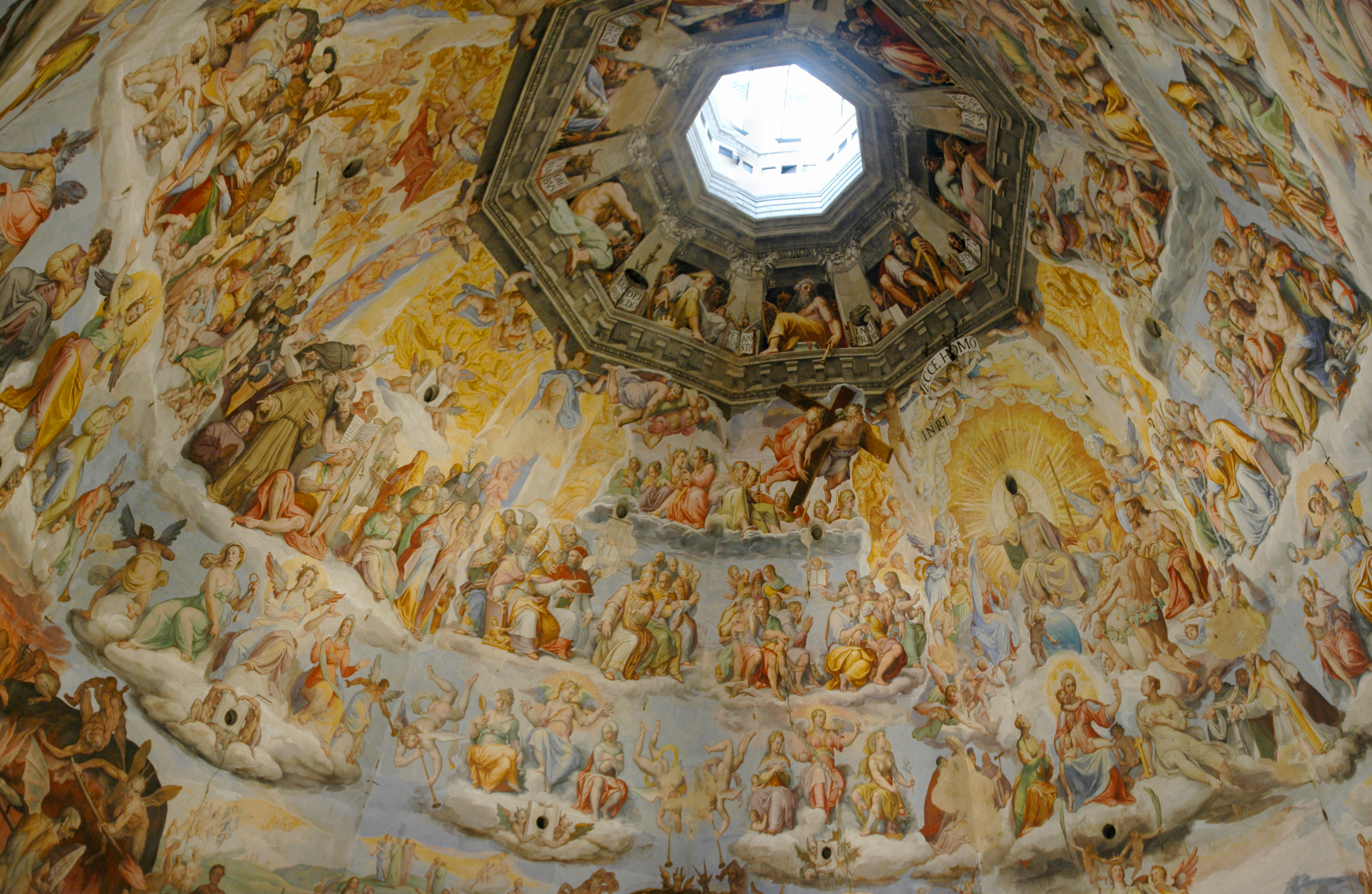
The Last Judgment

Vasari began the work in 1572. Brunelleschi had anticipated that access would be needed to the interior surface of the dome by installing iron rings from which scaffolding could be hung. There were also small windows in the inner shell through which a painter could crawl out onto suspended platforms. Despite the assistance of the Bolognese painter Lorenzo Sabatini, Vasari had completed only the uppermost level representing The 24 Elders of the Apocalypse and three sections of the one immediately below it prior to his death in June 1574. Cosimo had presided him by two months. His successor Francesco I de’ Medici decided to continue with the project and he commissioned Federico Zuccari to complete the work, with instructions to adhere to the use of fresco as well as both Vasari's drawings for the upper four segments of the cupola and his sketches for the scenes of Hell as well as his painting style. Zuccari's formal agreement to undertake the project was signed with the l’Opera di Santa Maria del Fiore in November 1575, and he commenced work on 30 August 1576. Among the artists who assisted him were Bartolomeo Carducci, Domenico Passignano and Stefano Pieri (who had been a collaborator of Zuccari's in Rome).

The work that had been completed to date reflected Vasari's "conservative" traditional Tuscan style- which had a harmonic delicacy with subtle colour changes and impeccably depicted figures. This was despite the restrictions imposed on him by the contract Zuccari, who was a stranger to Florentine culture and taste, and had attempted to impose his own stylistic language, by changing the physiques of the painted characters, the costumes and the colour range. Since the detail that was characteristic of Vasari's method was difficult to pick out from the floor of the cathedral, Zuccari drew on his experience of producing theatrical backcloths and the methods of Roman painters to produce a work that while of a poor executive quality, induced a grandiose final effect. This had the added benefit of allowing him to complete the project in three years, which was relatively fast for a commission of such size.

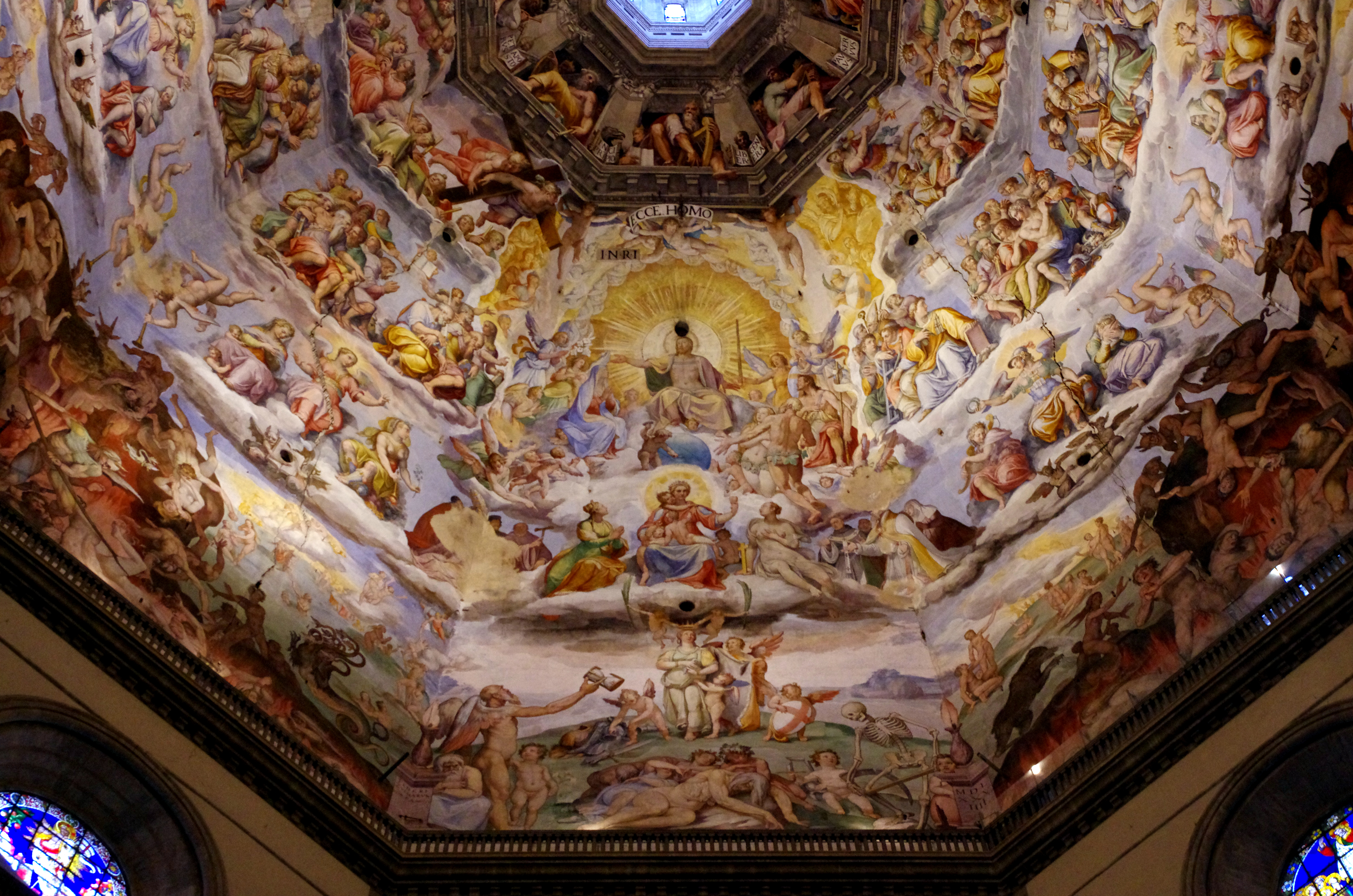
Another view of the painting.

Zuccari celebrated the completion of the project by commissioning a commemorative medallion (which is now preserved at the Bargello Museum). When the finished work was unveiled in August 1579 the Florentines were unhappy with the result and there were such scathing attacks that they deeply impacted on Zuccari's reputation and future commissions. The 16th-century author Antonio Francesco Grazzini humorously satirised the frescoes (in which "Giorgin" was a reference to Vasari):

“I speak the truth, not from a loathing of others nor to disparage, but really Giorgin d’Arezzo, Giorgin, Giorgin must be blamed for Giorgin sinned.”

Later the 20th century Italian art critic Carlo Ludovico Ragghianti proposed that the entire vault be whitewashed to better emphasize the pure forms of Brunelleschi's architecture.

The debate raged until the decision was made in 1981 to restore the frescoes.

=== Restoration ===
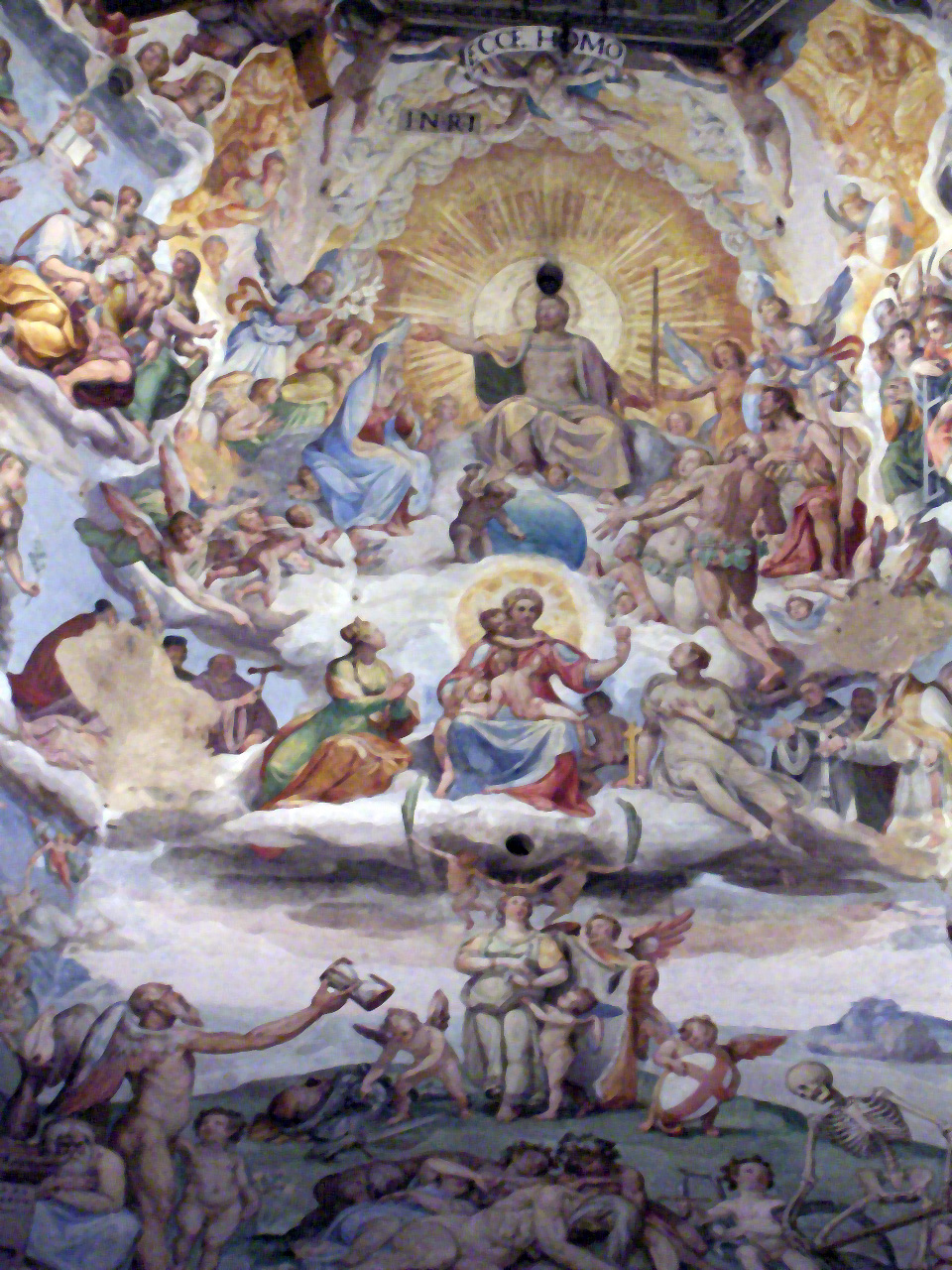
Detail of part of The Last Judgement.

Although 16 concentric layers of scaffolding were erected inside the cathedral in 1979 to provide access for the restorers it took another 10 years of research, preparation coupled with various delays before the actual restoration commenced in January 1989. Undertaken under the supervision of Cristina Acidini the restoration officially ended in January 1994 though it took until the end of 1995 for the scaffolding to be removed. A 196 feet (60 m) high elevator provided access from the ground up to start of the restoration levels. The project had an expected cost of $25 million.

To create the fresco Vasari used the true fresco method which involved the application of pigment directly to damp lime-based plaster without the use of a binding agent as he considered it was the most virile, most secure, most resolute and durable. The downside is that this method is one of the most difficult and time-consuming to use. Pressed for time, Zuccari mostly used the in secco method, which involves painting onto dry plaster using a weak limestone solution binder. Vasari had a poor opinion of this method believing that it was not durable. His belief was confirmed as restorers found that while Vasari's frescos were virtually intact and the colours still well integrated into the plaster Zuccari's frescos had suffered a notable loss of colour and in some areas had become detached from the wall. As the principal impact on the artwork had been from dust and grime (which been deposited by smoke rising upwards from church activities) the frescoes are mostly cleaned with deionized water, which was applied in a wood-flour compress through a sheet of Japanese paper. Where the artwork was in a more fragile state only paper and water was used. The compress was left on for 20 minutes, before it was removed and the dirt carefully removed using a cotton swab. Where Zuccari's colours had irreversibly detached themselves from the supporting wall, it was necessary for the restorers to reattach them using acrylic resins.

=== Documenting ===
During the restoration work the entire pictorial cycle of The Last Judgment was photographed with specially designed equipment and all the information collected in a catalogue. All the restoration information along with reconstructed images of the frescos were stored and managed in the Thesaurus Florentinus computer system.

== Description ==
The frescos cover 10,500 sq ft (980 m^{2}) though other sources state 14,000 sq ft (1,300 m^{2}) and 3,600 m^{2} (39,000 sq ft)

The painting consists of five concentric levels and eight triangular segments (spicchi).

From top to bottom starting from the central false lantern surrounded by the 24 Elders of the Apocalypse, the painting is organised as follows:

- The 24 Elders of the Apocalypse. There are three in each segment.
- Choirs of Angels. Which features angels with a variety of musical instruments and holding the instruments of the Passion, including a cross, a chalice, a column, a crown of thorns, dice, a flagellum, nails, a pitcher for vinegar, a pincher, a robe, a sponge, and a sword.
  - Cherubim and Seraphim with “INRI – ECCE HOMO”
  - Thrones with the cross
  - Power with the column
  - Archangels with the nails and pliers
  - Angels with Christ's robe
  - Principalities with the crown of thorns
  - Dominations with the sponge
  - Virtues with the lance and chalice
- Christ, Mary and Saints
  - Christ, Mary, John the Baptist, various Florentine saints, Adam and Eve
  - Apostles and Evangelists
  - Popes, Bishops and Priests
  - Virgins and members of the religious orders
  - The people of God
  - Emperors, kings and princes
  - Doctors of the Church
  - Martyrs and warrior saints
- Virtues, Gifts of the Holy Spirit and Beatitudes. These depict the seven virtues, the gift of the Holy Spirit and the seven beatitudes.
  - Hope, Charity, Faith
  - Brotherly love, “Blessed are peacemakers”, Wisdom
  - Prudence, “Blessed the meek”, Understanding
  - Temperance, “Blessed the pure of heart”, Piety
  - Humility, “Blessed the poor”, Fear of the Lord
  - Counsel, “Blessed the merciful”, Justice
  - Continence, “Blessed those who hunger for justice”, Knowledge
  - Patience, “Blessed those who mourn”, Fortitude
- Capital Sins and Hell. This level features a large Lucifer with each segment is dominated by a cardinal sin.
  - Time (represented by an allegorical figure of a person with an hourglass), Nature and the Seasons (each represented by a child) and Death before the Church Triumphant.
  - Envy
  - Sloth
  - Lust
  - Pride
  - Greed
  - Gluttony
  - Anger

On the segment in front of the central nave, there are only three levels in order to provide space for a large figure of Christ between the Madonna and St. John the Baptist.

The artwork contains 700 figures, consisting of 248 angels, 235 souls, 21 contemporary personalities, 102 religious’ figures, 35 damned, 23 cherubs, 14 monsters, 13 portraits and 12 animals. Among the contemporary characters that Zuccari depicted were the Medici patrons (Cosimo I de Medici and his son Francesco), the emperor, the king of France, Borghini, Giambologna, Vasari, and other artists, and even himself and many of his relatives (such as deceased brother Taddeo) and friends.

== Gallery ==
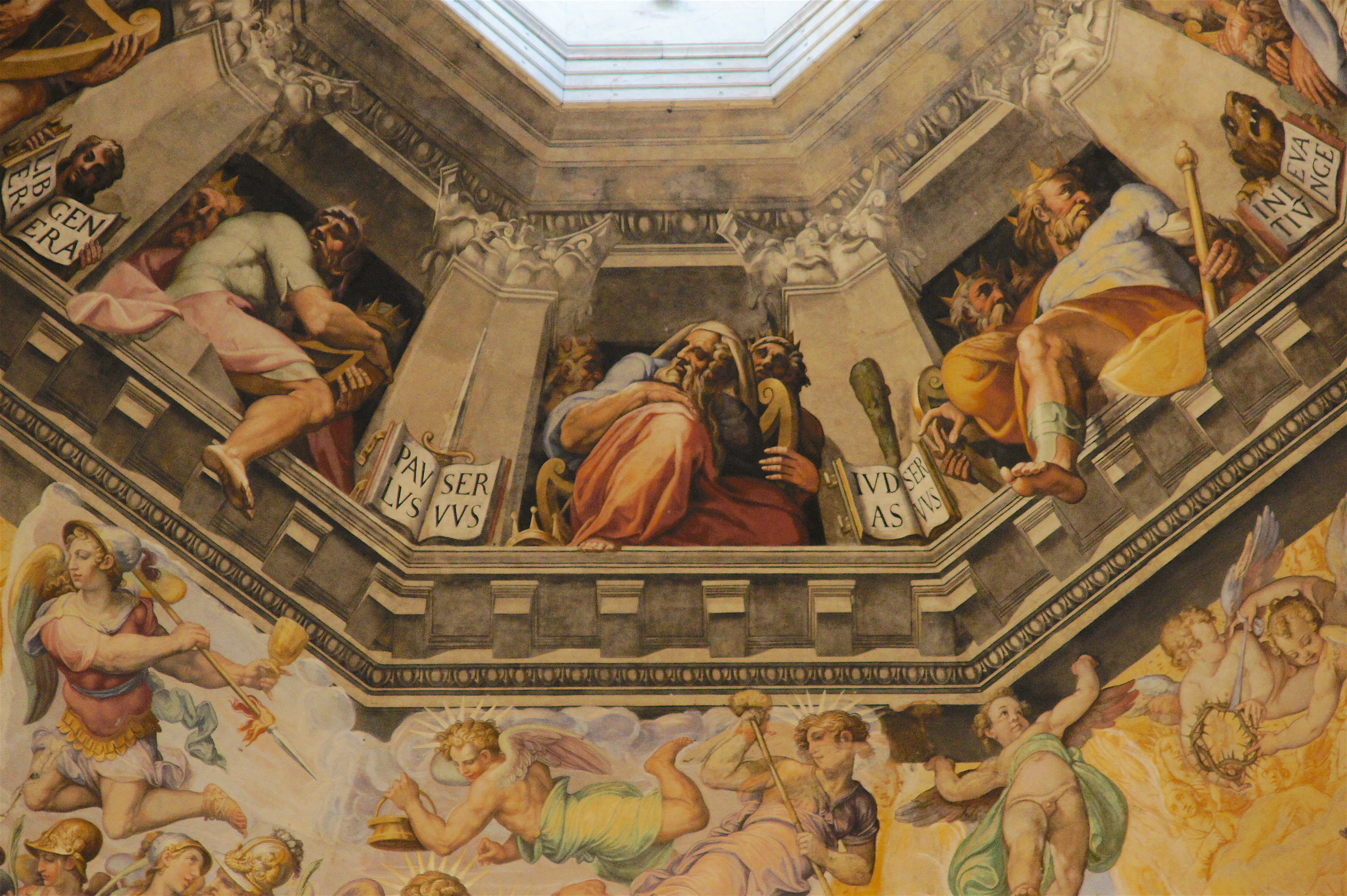
The Elders of the Apocalypse by Giorgio Vasari

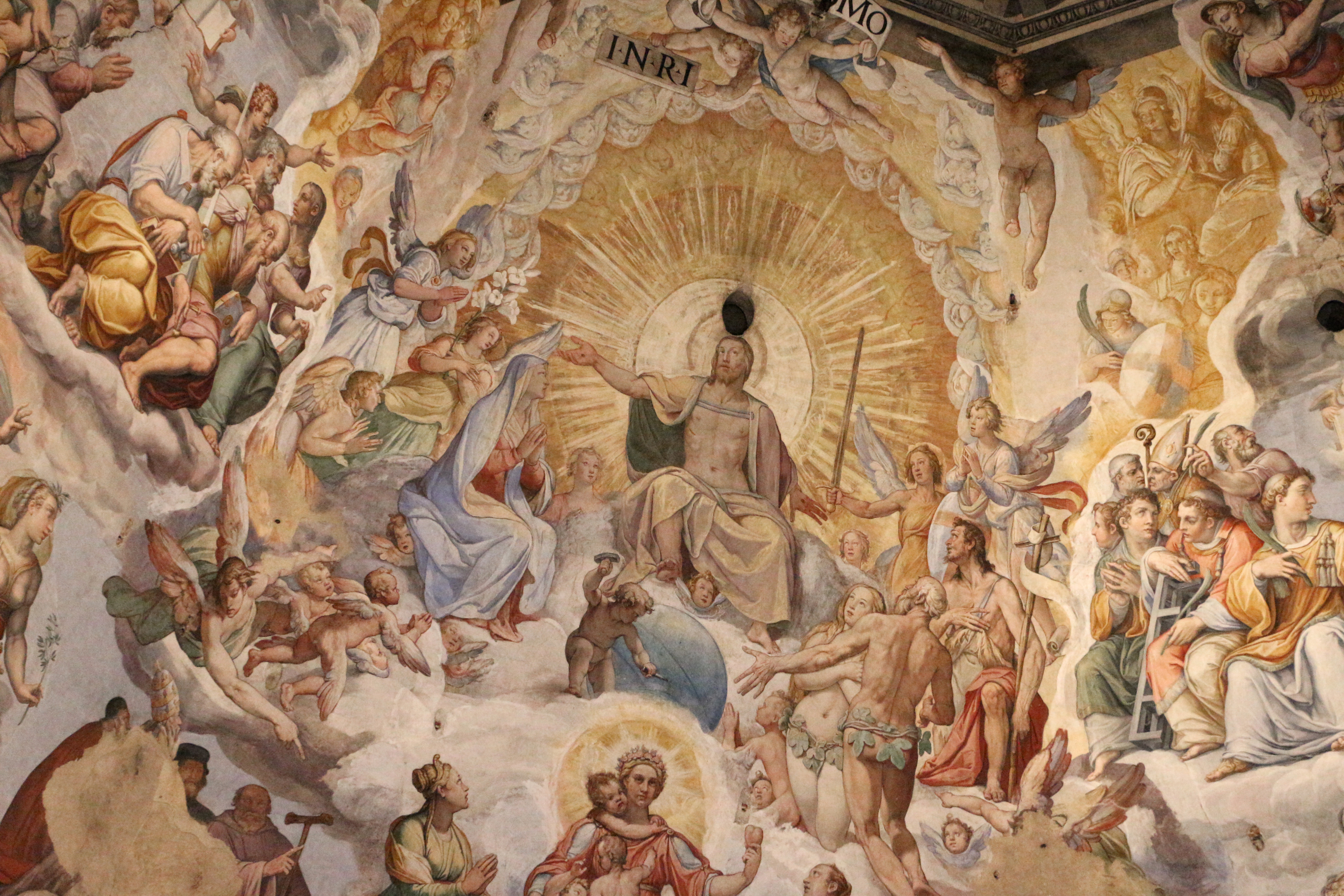
Christ enthroned by Federico Zuccari

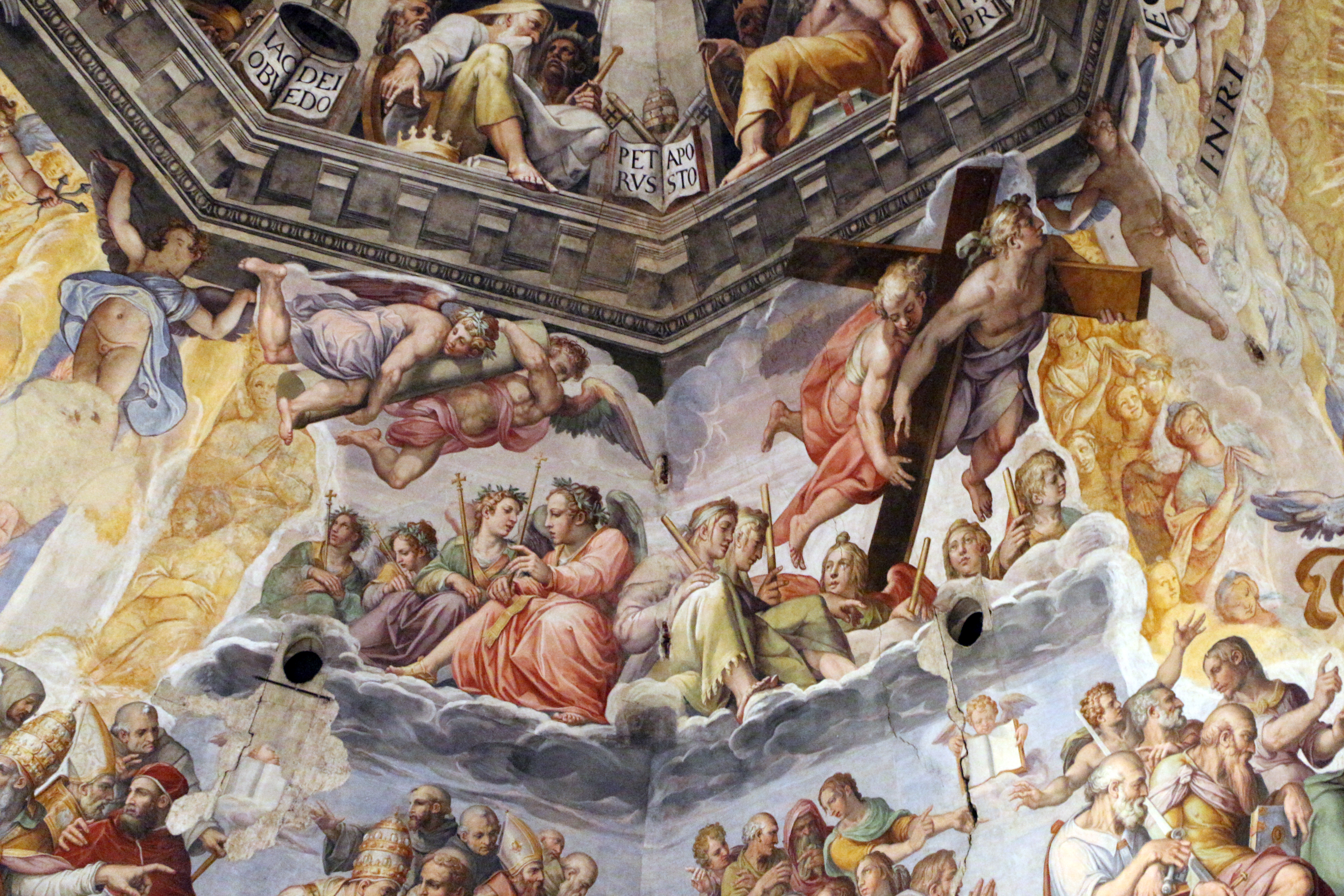
Some Instruments of the Passion (cross and column) by Federico Zuccari

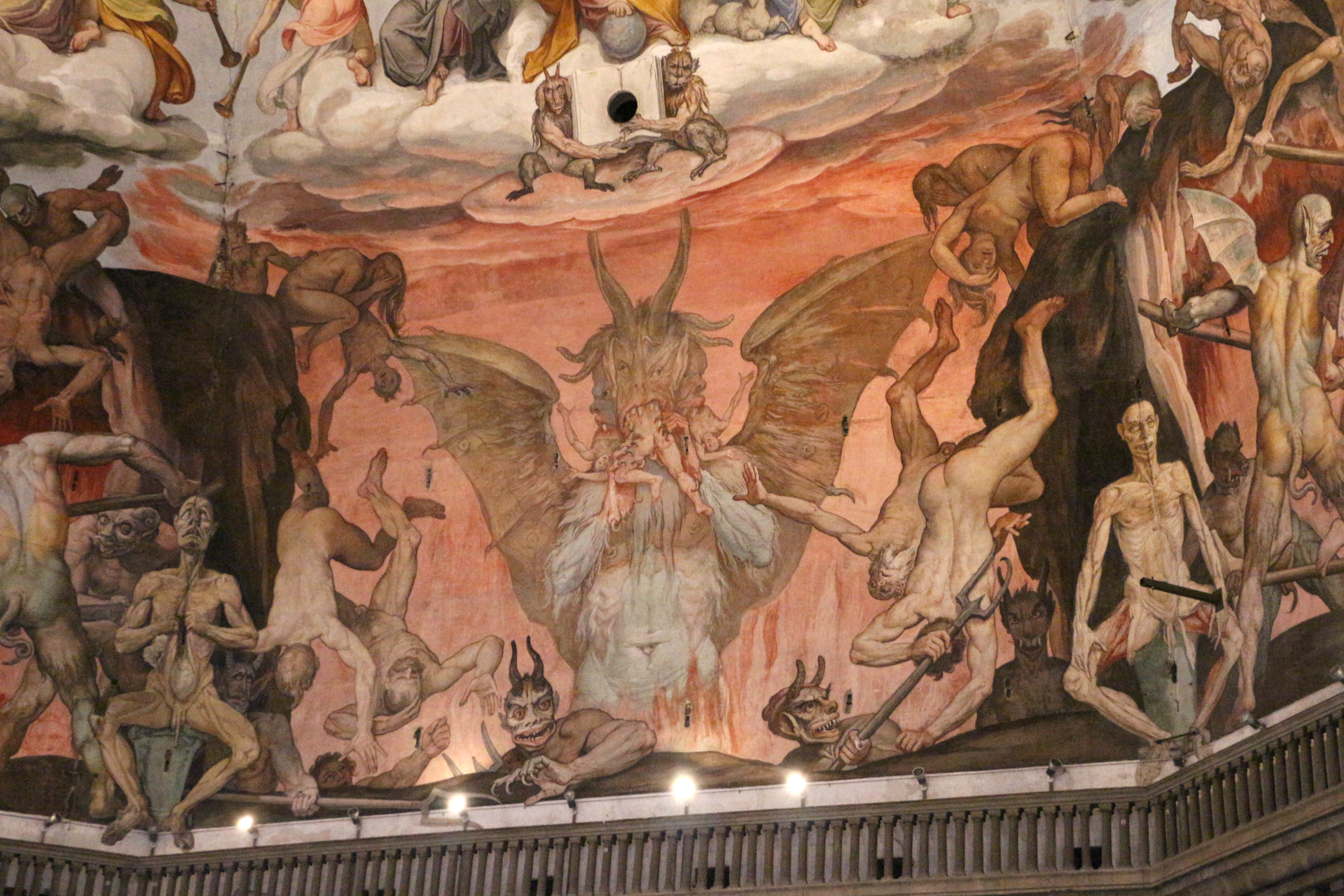
Satan by Federico Zuccari
