= Michaelangelo Meucci =

Italian painter

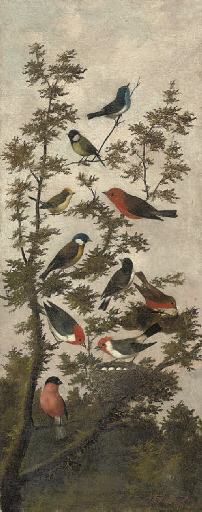
Songbirds in a tree (1892), signed M. Meucci 1892/Firenze

Michaelangelo Meucci (1840–1909) was an Italian artist, known for his paintings of birds, including dead game birds. He also painted still-life pictures of flowers.

He was active in Florence (Italian: Firenze).
