= Bartolomeo Carducci =

Italian painter

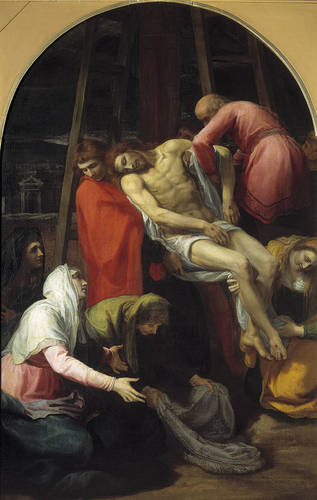
Descent from the Cross by Bartolomeo Carducci, Museo del Prado, 1595

Bartolomeo Carducci (1560 – 14 November 1608) was an Italian painter, better known as Carducho, the Spanish corruption of his Italian patronymic.

== Biography ==
Carducci was born in Florence, where he studied architecture and sculpture under Bartolomeo Ammannati, and painting under Federico Zuccari. He assisted Zuccari with the completion of The Last Judgment on the ceiling of the dome of Florence Cathedral. The latter master he accompanied to Madrid, where he painted the ceiling of the Escorial library, assisting also in the production of the frescos that adorn the cloisters of that noted palace.

Between 1604 and 1606, Carducci painted the reliquary altarpieces of San Diego de Valladolid, with the assistance of his brother Vincenzo Carducci. They are now exhibited in National Museum of Sculpture.

Among Carducci's pupils was Francisco López.

Carducci died in Spain; his brother Vincenzo succeeded him as chief painter to King Philip III of Spain.

== Works ==
Most of Carducci's works are in Spain. His Descent from the Cross, originally in Madrid's San Felipe el Real, is now in the Museo del Prado, along with his Last Supper. The Real Academia de Bellas Artes de San Fernando owns his Penitent St. Jerome.
