= Michelangelo Carducci =

16th-century Italian painter

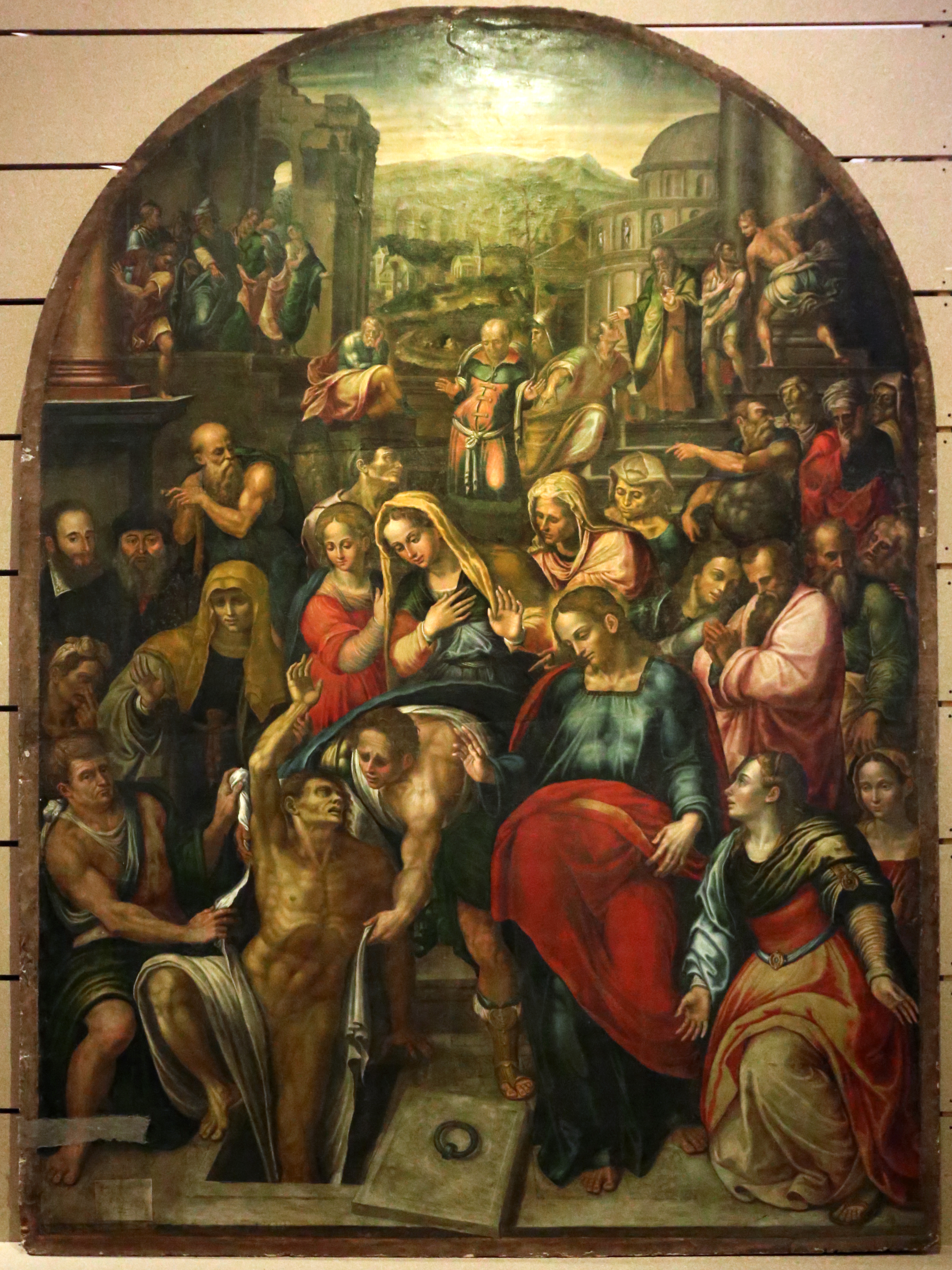
Resurrection of Lazarus, 1560

Michelangelo Carducci was a 16th-century Italian painter of the Renaissance period active in Umbria. He was born in Norcia. Extant works include:

- Resurrection of Lazarus, fresco in the Basilica of San Benedetto, Norcia (signed and dated 1560)
- Crucifixion with the Virgin and St. John, fresco in the church of Santa Maria della Misericordia, Spello (1562)
