= Palazzo Della Stufa =

Historic building in Florence, Italy

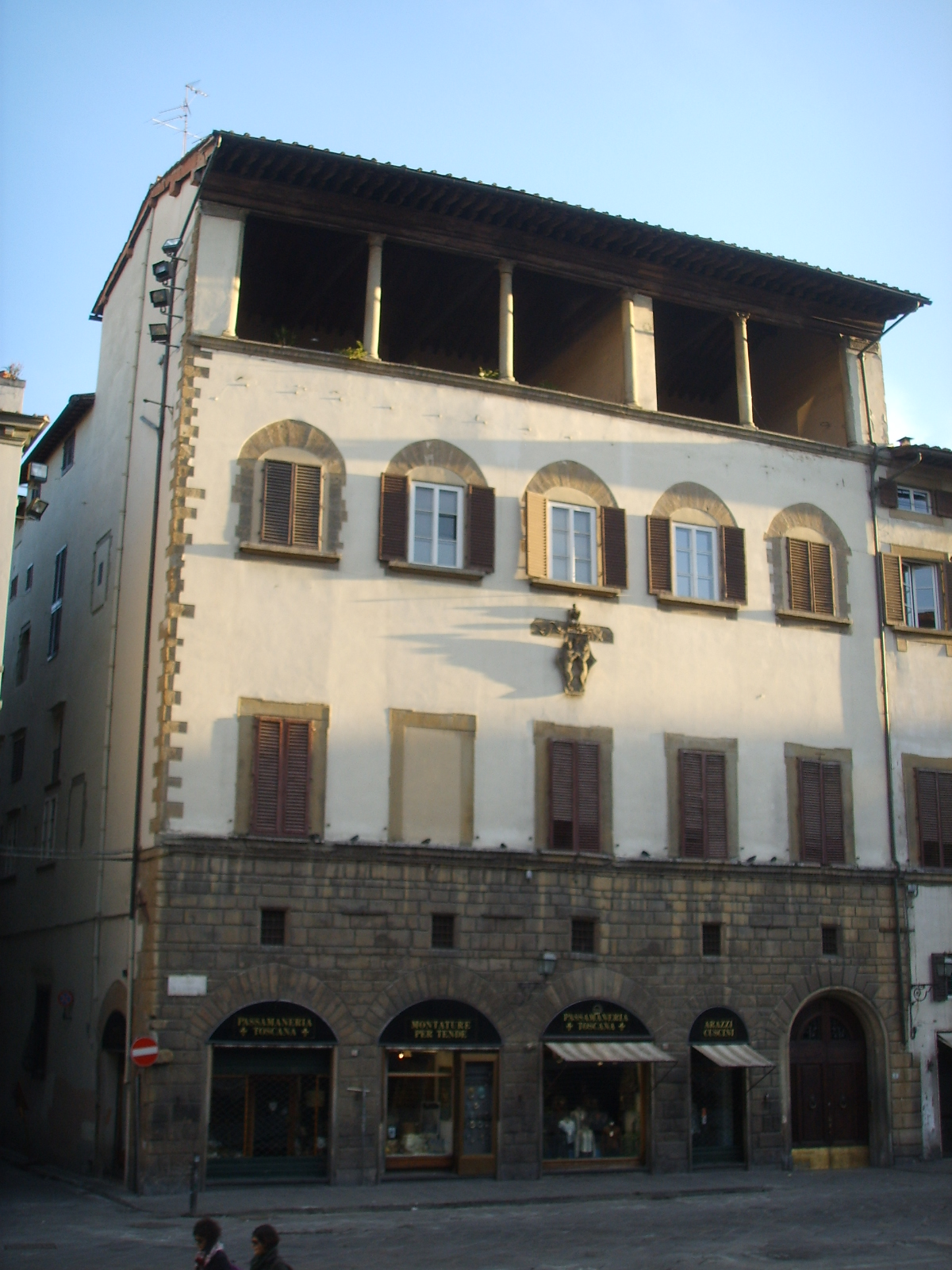
- Palazzo della stufa, Florence

- 43°46′31.4″N 11°15′15.8″E
- Location: Florence, Italy

History
- Founded: 14th century
- Founder: Lotteringhi Della Stufa

Site notes
- Architect: Florentine architecture

Palazzo Della Stufa or Lotteringhi Della Stufa, is in the Piazza San Lorenzo, at the corner of Via della Stufa, in Florence, Italy, in front of the Basilica di San Lorenzo.

== History ==
The building was built by the Lotteringhi Della Stufa in the 14th century and was inhabited by the descendants of the same family for seven centuries, until 1946, when it became a condominium. The Della Stufa family, colonize in the 11th century as "Lotteringhi", changed their name during their ownership of the "Stufa di San Lorenzo", one of the ancient public baths of the city. Among them there were two blessed, Lotteringo Della Stufa, was one of the seven founders of the order of the Servants of Mary, and the friar Girolamo Della Stufa. The building was rebuilt in the 16th century, on houses owned by the family since the 13th century. The Della Stufa were supporters of the Medici.

The building has a six-column roof terrace-built ca. 1470. It appears on the Buonsignori Map of the city of Florence, produced as an etching in 1584. The building has three floors with a large shield with the family coat of arms in pietra serena sandstone (in silver, with two lions holding a Latin cross in red). The windows with ashlar stones on light plaster are typical in Florentine architecture.

In 1972, Marcello Jacorossi restored important elements of the building:

A grandiose building which, in the lower part, with regular drafts of raised stones, retains the original character. From the appeal frame up the facade is plastered and colored the windows have been reduced to a rectangular shape. Above, a majestic roof terrace or open loggia with columns supporting the large roof. traces of stones from the primitive construction, now modern in character. However, the entire building has its original structure under the plaster.

On the side of Via della Stufa is a 17th century plaster shrine of Madonna and child by Donatello. The collection of Piero Bargellini and Garneri restorations that were carried out in the early 1970s brought to light portions of the ancient factory.

=== Della Stufa-Traballesi palace ===
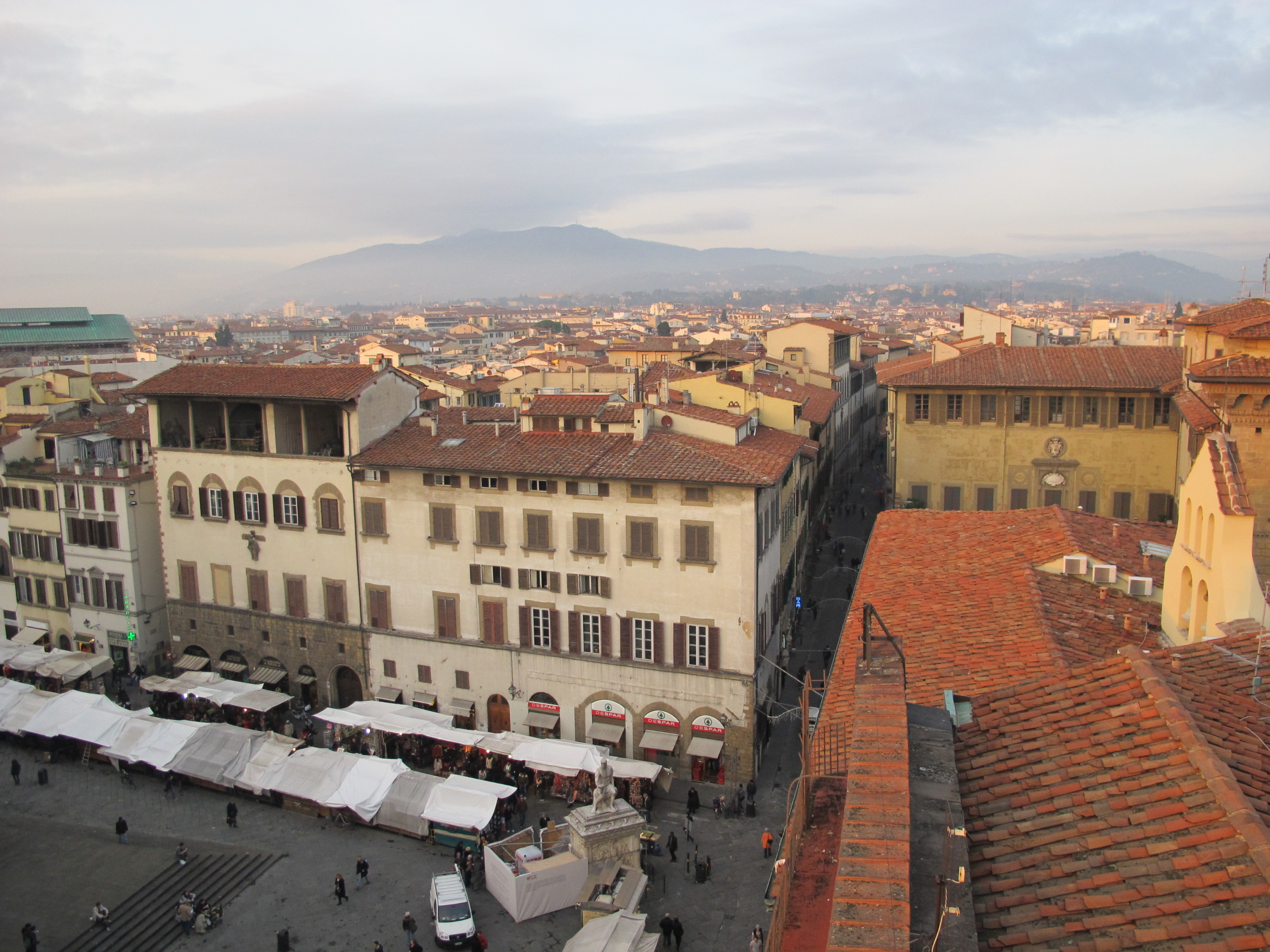
The two buildings together, seen from the Ximenian Observatory

The building next to the Palazzo Della Stufa, between the square and Via de 'Ginori, has a different design and a different eaves. This portion is dated ca. 1665-1666, when the building was enlarged by Gherardo Silvani and his son Pier Francesco when Lotteringhi Della Stufa received an inheritance.

This change was a new front, extremely simple, with arched portal in the center and square openings on the ground floor, windows highlighted by a smooth frame on the four levels, and street bench, however renouncing to extend the stone and the large loggia on the top floor of the 15th century building, in turn updated in the design of the architrave windows

— Chiara Martelli

On Via dei Ginori there is an inscription and a shield with arms.

Both buildings appear in the list drawn up in 1901 by the General Directorate of Antiquities and Fine Arts, as monumental buildings to be considered national artistic heritage.

== See also ==
- List of buildings and structures in Florence
- List of World Heritage Sites in Italy
- List of squares in Florence
- Historic Centre of Florence

== Bibliography ==
- New guide of the city of Florence or description of all the things that are worthy of observation, with plans and views, latest edition compiled by Giuseppe François, Florence, Vincenzo Bulli, 1850, p. 120; Florentine illustrator 1880, pp. 56–58
- The Florentine illustrator. Historical calendar for the year, edited by Guido Carocci, Florence, Dominican Typography, 1880, pp. 56–58
- Ministry of Education (General Directorate of Antiquities and Fine Arts), List of Monumental Buildings in Italy, Rome, Ludovico Cecchini printing company, 1902, p. 254
- Walther Limburger, Die Gebäude von Florenz: Architekten, Strassen und Plätze in alphabetischen Verzeichnissen, Leipzig, FA Brockhaus, 1910, no. 385
- Augusto Garneri, Florence and surroundings: around with an artist. Guide to recollection of historical and critical practice, Turin et alt., Paravia & C., sd ma 1924, p. 183, n. IX
- Walther Limburger, The constructions of Florence, translation, bibliographic and historical updatesby Mazzino Fossi, Florence, Superintendence of Monuments of Florence, 1968 (typescript at the Library of the Superintendence for Architectural Heritage and Landscape for the provinces of Florence Pistoia and Prato, 4/166), no. 385
- The Florentine Palaces. Neighborhood of San Giovanni, introduction by Piero Bargellini, cards of the palaces by Marcello Jacorossi, Florence, Committee for City Aesthetics, 1972, p. 185, n. 349
- Piero Bargellini, Ennio Guarnieri, The streets of Florence, 4 vols., Florence, Bonechi, 1977-1978, II, 1977, pp. 160-161
- Franco Cesati, The streets of Florence. History, anecdotes, art, secrets and curiosities of the most fascinating city in the world through 2400 streets, squares and songs, 2 vols., Rome, Newton & Compton editori, 2005, II, p. 590
- Franco Cesati, The squares of Florence. History, art, folklore and characters who have made famous the two hundred historical stages of the most loved city in the world, Rome, Newton & Compton editori, 2005, p. 234
- Touring Club Italiano, Florence and its province, Milan, Touring Editore, 2005, p. 289
- Atlas of the Baroque in Italy. Tuscany / 1. Florence and the Grand Duchy. Provinces of Grosseto, Livorno, Pisa, Pistoia, Prato, Siena, edited by Mario Bevilacqua and Giuseppina Carla Romby, Rome, De Luca Art Editors, 2007, Chiara Martelli, p. 416, n. 113
- Marcello Vannucci, Splendid palaces of Florence, Le Lettere, Florence 1995 ISBN 887166230X
