= Collegio degli Scolopi =

Historic building in Florence, Italy

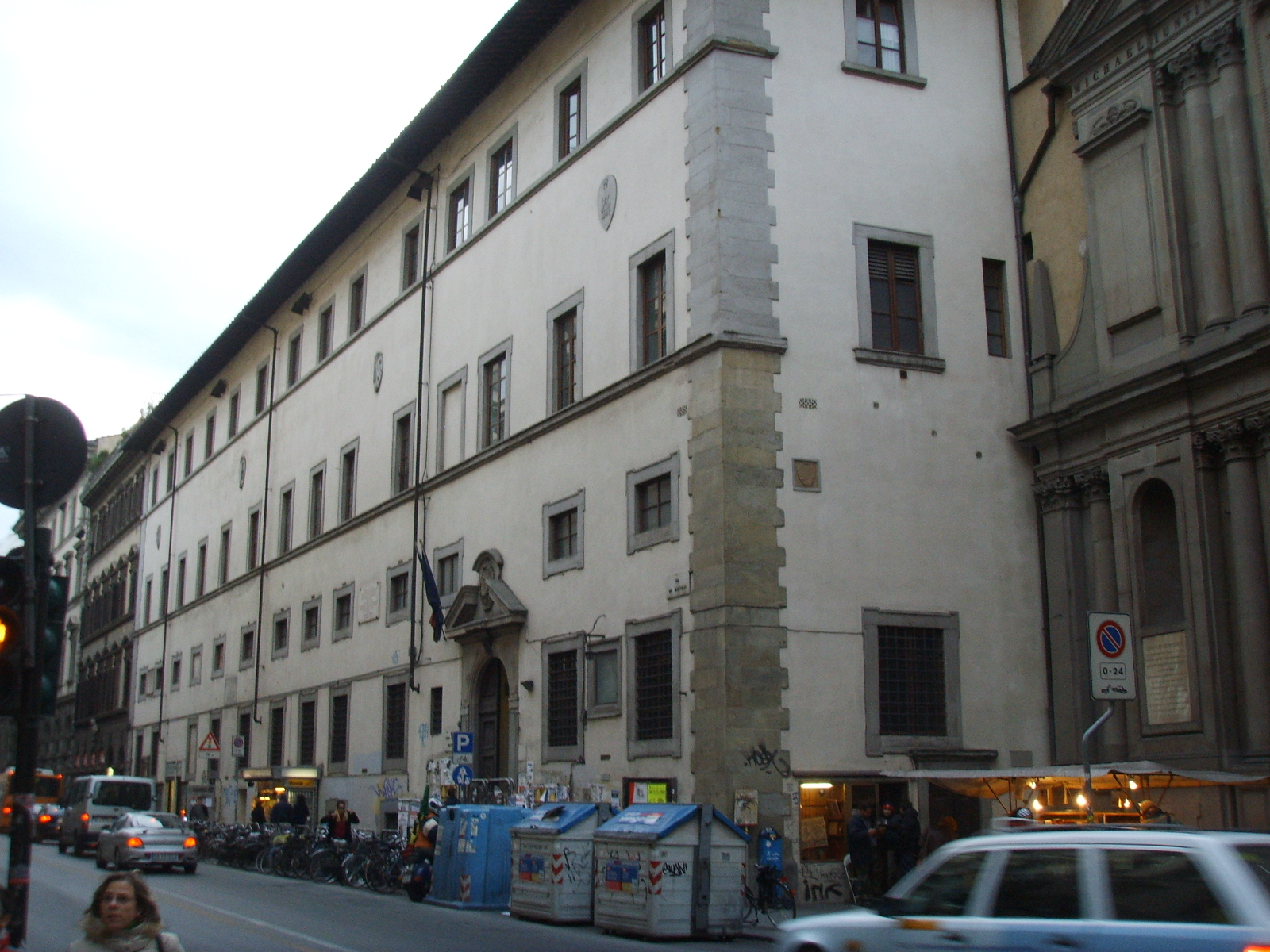
- Collegio degli Scolopi

- Location in the municipality of Florence
- 43°46′28.3″N 11°15′20.3″E
- Location: Florence, Italy

History
- Founded: 14th century
- Original use: Convent

Site notes
- Architect: Bartolomeo Ammannati
- Architectural style: Florentine architecture

The former Collegio degli Scolopi is a large building in Florence, annexed to the church of San Giovanni degli Scolopi and located between via de 'Martelli, via dei Gori, Piazza San Lorenzo and Borgo San Lorenzo. Formerly the palace of the Martelli family (which gave the street its name), it was the seat of the Jesuit order, designed on a grand scale by Bartolomeo Ammannati, then housed the college of the Piarists and finally, after the suppression of the convents, it became a school. Today most of its rooms are occupied by the Galileo state classical high school, but in one part there is also the Ximenian observatory, with access from the rear Borgo San Lorenzo.

== History ==
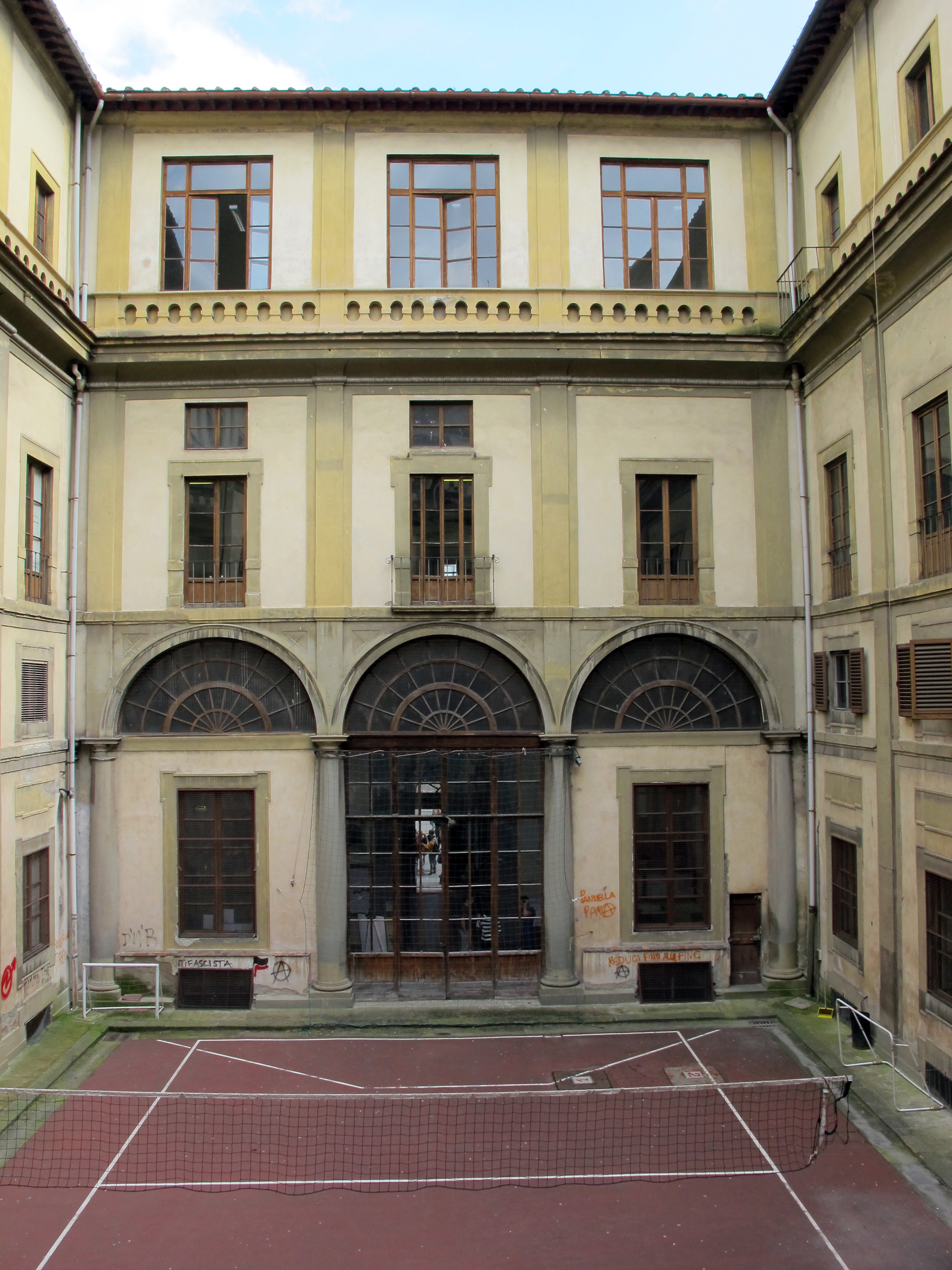
Collegio degli scolopi, courtyard

Originally, a convent, there were many houses belonging to various families, including the Martelli and Gori Ciampellis. On the side of Piazza San Marco it was the House of Medici. In 1557, the church and the annexed houses were granted to the Jesuits who erected the convent and enlarged the church. Once the Jesuits were suppressed, it was given to the Piarist Fathers who established their college there. Without prejudice to the close link between this building and the nearby church of San Giovannino, it can be identified in particular as the date of origin of the current complex in 1554, when part of this area was granted by Cosimo I de' Medici to the Jesuits to found a college there. They entrusted the design to Bartolomeo Ammannati so that, even before the construction of the church, in 1579, part of the building could be considered defined. However, various obstacles did not allow the completion of the works which, having remained interrupted for many years, only resumed in 1620 based on a project by architect Giulio Parigi.

In the second half of the 17th century the college still showed a considerable degree of indeterminacy, with a courtyard of which only the arm towards via de 'Martelli had finished and the one to the south had just begun. This situation did not change until, in 1686, the grand-ducal architect Giovanni Battista Foggini took charge of a new project. The latter opened an important construction site in 1688, followed later in the 19th century by Origoni.

... who definitively gave the structure a complete planimetric articulation linked to the functional and pedagogical needs of the Society of Jesus.

The definitive configuration of the complex took place in the 19th century, with the purchase of further houses of the Martelli by the Town Hall (1836), followed by the expansion and definition of the facade on via de 'Martelli, by the completion of the walls of the courtyard, and the latest transformations of the facade facing Piazza San Lorenzo, all based on the design and construction supervision of the architect Leopoldo Pasqui, who closed the construction site in July 1838. Starting from 1878, part of the structure houses the Galileo state classical high school.

=== Description ===
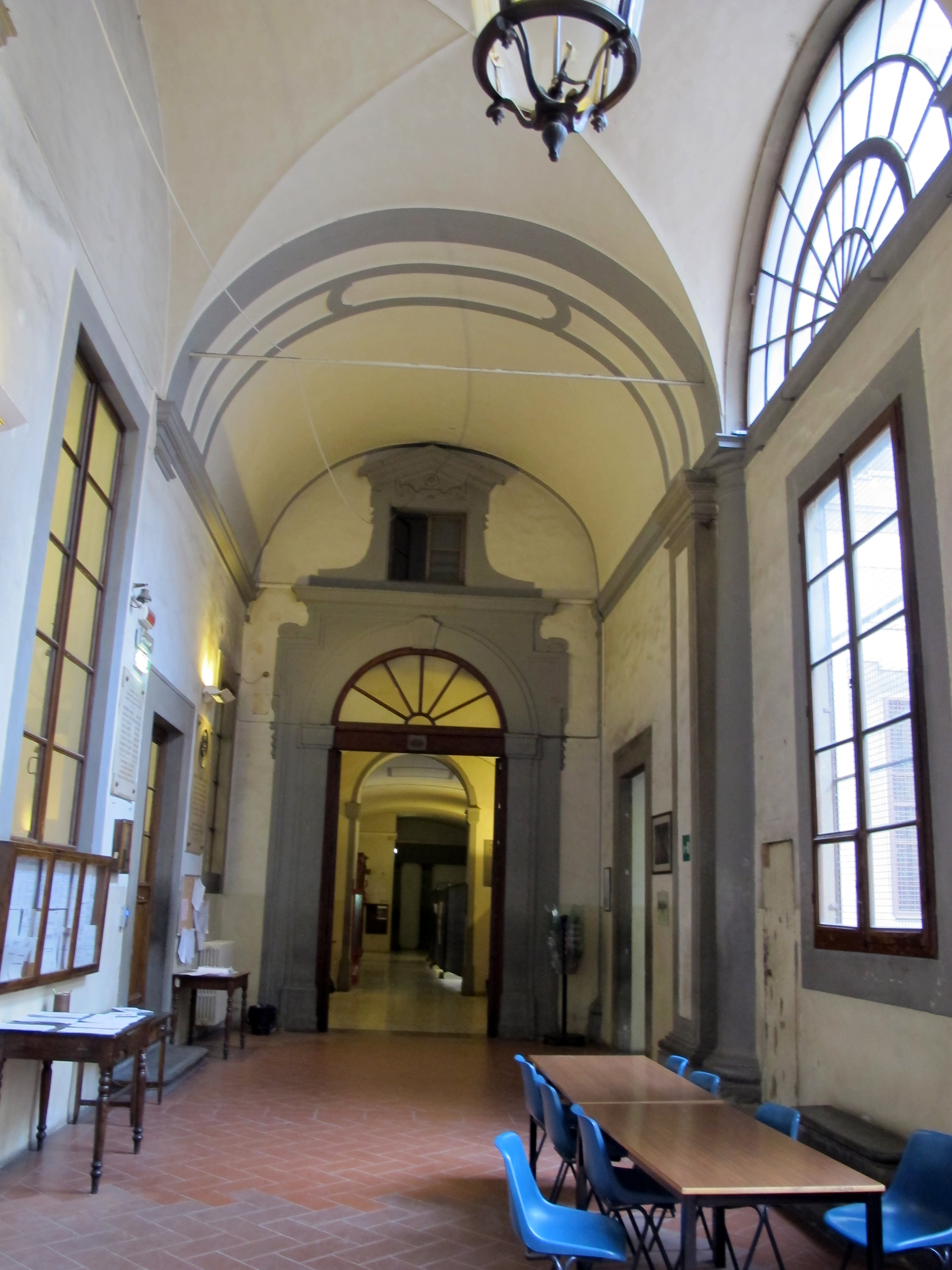
Collegio degli scolopi, internal corridor

Externally it is a large building of simple shapes, characterized by a door of character of the end of the seventeenth century and with decorations among which the trigram of Christ, arms of the Society of Jesus, is inserted, to identify it as the initial property of the Jesuits.

As for the appearance of the front, note on the right of the door a small tabernacle with a Madonna and Child, a marble bas-relief already approached in the manner of sculptor Bernardo Rossellino and now brought back to a master conventionally referred to by this work as "Maestro di Via Martelli" (restored in 1999). In the upper part of the façade there are four almond-shaped shields bearing respectively the weapons and the insignia: of the Martelli; of the Municipality (chiseled) and of the Piarists; of the chapter of San Lorenzo and of the Gori Ciampelli; of the Piarists.

There are three plaques: the living room of Leonardo da Vinci in 1508, who lived here with Giovanni Francesco Rustici, the concession to the Piarists of the houses of the Martelli, and the residence of the Pious Schools from 1775 to 1878.

The literature also indicates a small square on the façade with the coat of arms of the Chapter of San Lorenzo inscribed in a circle, with the number 30 below, which however is not visible today. In the hall there is a plaque with the Bulletin of Victory by General Diaz.

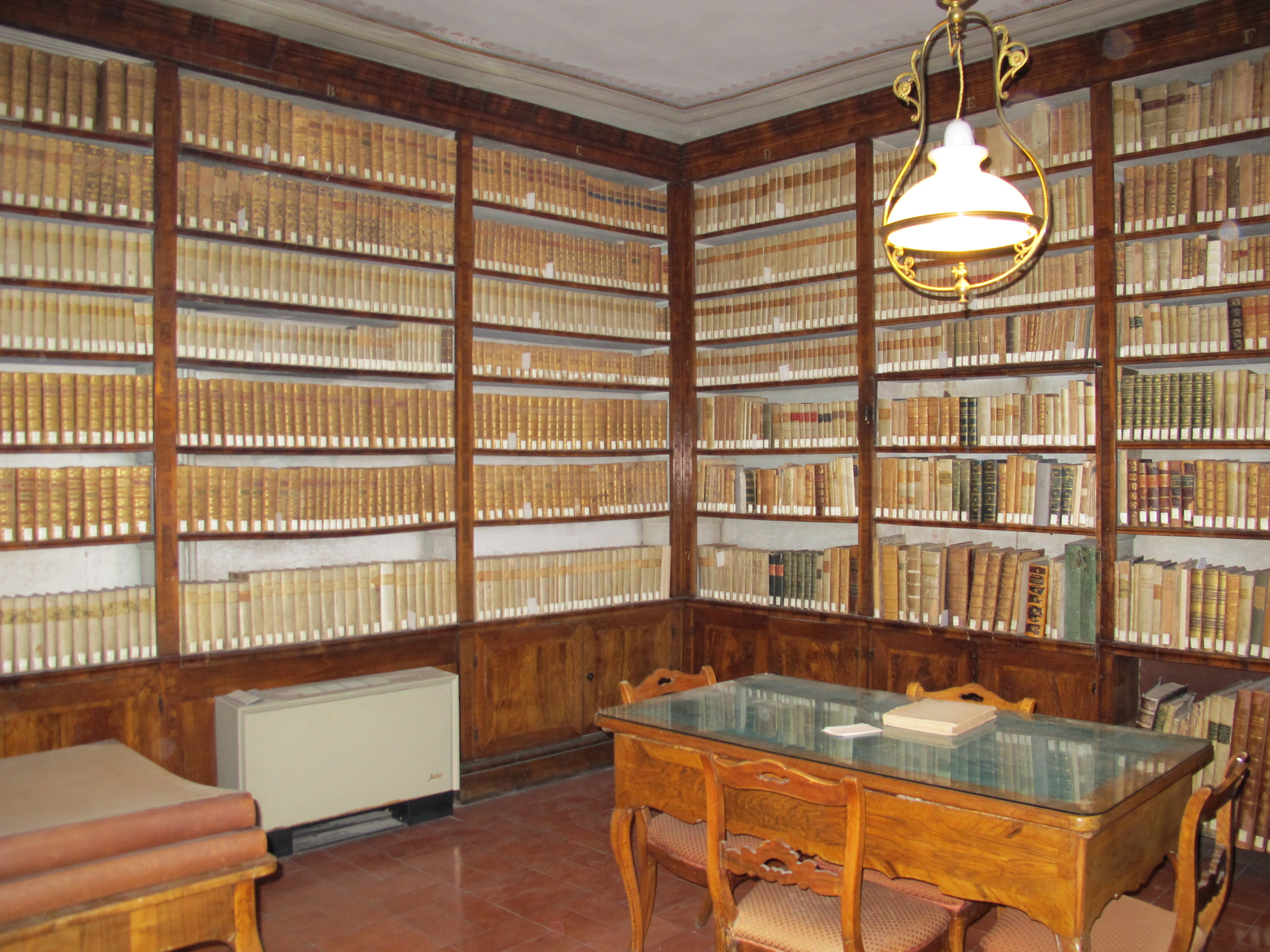
Ximenian Observatory, Ancient Library

The portion of Piazza San Lorenzo, Marcello Jacorossi is the simplest and least adorned part of the large building which was used for a long time as a convent and college. The lines are simple and the stone parts without decoration. The Fathers of the Society of Jesus to whom the church of San Giovanni Evangelista had been granted in 1557, bought the houses and shops that were in this place and included them in the new building of their convent. In 1773 the Fathers of the Pious Schools had the large room and reduced this part of the building to its present form. Towards the corner of via de 'Gori, a small but graceful tabernacle that contains a tablet with the head of the Madonna, a good painting from the second half of the 16th century. On the side of via de 'Gori, always close to the corner, there is an inscription relating to a notice of the Eight of guards and balia dated to ca. 1698. In the short entrance hall there are three monumental twisted columns, from where you enter the Ximenian Observatory.

=== Ximenian Observatory ===
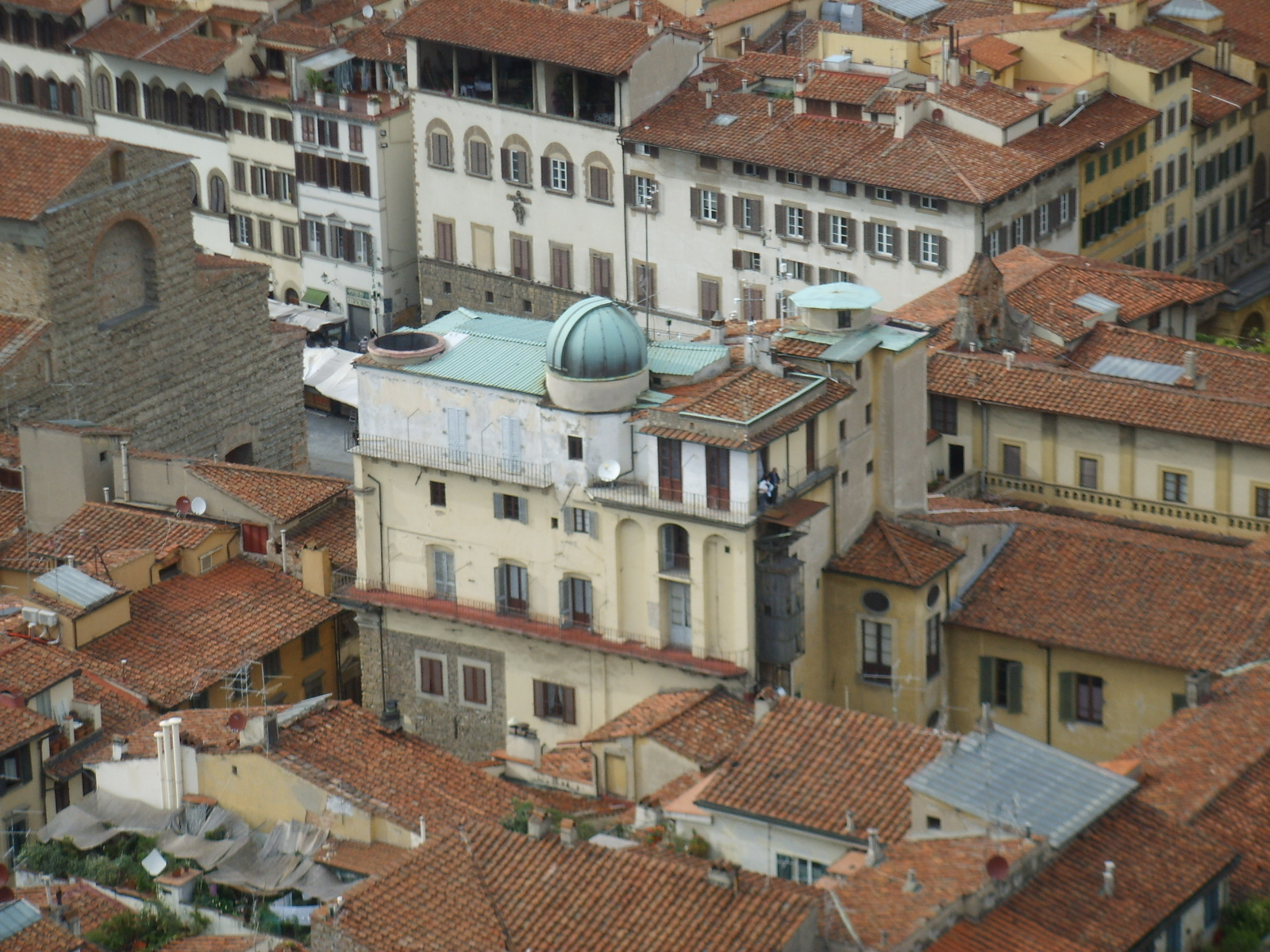
Ximenian Observatory

The Observatory houses two specialized libraries, one ancient and one modern, rooms for measuring equipment and numerous historical collections (especially instruments for radio transmissions, astronomical and meteorological observations, seismological instruments), arranged in such a way as to be able to be used as a historical-didactic path. There is also a reproduction of the first internal combustion engine in history, by Barsanti Matteucci. The premises contain some important works of the Florentine sixteenth and seventeenth centuries, albeit in undervalued locations, near the stairwell. Among these are Giovanni Bizzelli's Sant'Elena (1587), San Girolamo supported by an angels, among the masterpieces of Jacopo Ligozzi, and an Immaculate Conception by Francesco Curradi.

The building also incorporates the ancient Torre dei Rondinelli, at the top of which the Observatory tower has been obtained, with the white dome for astronomical observations, clearly visible from the whole city.

== See also ==
- List of buildings and structures in Florence
- List of World Heritage Sites in Italy
- List of squares in Florence
- Historic Centre of Florence
- List of Jesuit sites

== Bibliography ==
- Marco Lastri, The Florentine observer on the buildings of his homeland, third edition executed over that of 1797, rearranged and completed by the author, with the addition of various annotations by professor Giuseppe Del Rosso R. Consultore Architect, ascribed to several different science societies, and Fine Arts, 8 vols., Florence, by Gaspero Ricci, 1821, I, pp. 173–181
- Federico Fantozzi, New guide or historical-artistic description of the city and outlines of Florence, Florence, Giuseppe and the Ducci brothers, 1842, p. 453
- Federico Fantozzi, Geometric plan of the city of Florence in the proportion of 1 to 4500 raised from life and accompanied by historical annotations, Firenze, Galileiana, 1843, pp. 125–126, n. 282
- Emilio Bacciotti, Florence illustrated in its history, families, monuments, arts and sciences from its origin to our times, 3 vols., Florence, Mariani Printing House and Cooperative Printing House, 1879–1886, III, 1886, pp. 337–339
- Inscriptions and memoirs of the city of Florence, collected and illustrated by M.ro Francesco Bigazzi, Florence, Tip. of the Art of the Press, 1886, pp. 282–283
- Walther Limburger, Die Gebäude von Florenz: Architekten, Strassen und Plätze in alphabetischen Verzeichnissen, Leipzig, F.A. Brockhaus, 1910, n. 315
- Augusto Garneri, Florence and surroundings: around with an artist. Guide to recollection of historical and critical practice, Turin et alt., Paravia & C., s.d. ma 1924, p. 245, n. LXI
- Walther Limburger, The constructions of Florence, translation, bibliographic and historical updates by Mazzino Fossi, Florence, Superintendence of Monuments of Florence, 1968 (typescript at the Library of the Superintendence for Architectural Heritage and Landscape for the provinces of Florence Pistoia and Prato, 4/166), n. 315
- Touring Club Italiano, Florence and surroundings, Milan, Touring Editor, 1974, p. 252
- Touring Club Italiano, Florence and surroundings, Milan, Touring Editor, 2005, p. 285
- Piero Bargellini, Ennio Guarnieri, The streets of Florence, 4 vols., Florence, Bonechi, 1977–1978, II, 1977, pp. 238–239
- Osanna Fantozzi Micali, Piero Roselli, The suppressions of the convents in Florence. Reuse and transformations from the century XVIII onwards, Florence, Libreria Editrice Fiorentina, 1980, pp. 150–151
- Bruno Santi, Tabernacle in Florence: the restorations (1991–2001), Florence, Loggia de 'Lanzi for the Friends of the Florentine Museums Association, Committee for the decoration and restoration of tabernacles, 2002, pp. 82–83
- Franco Cesati, The streets of Florence. History, anecdotes, art, secrets and curiosities of the most fascinating city in the world through 2400 streets, squares and songs, 2 vols., Rome, Newton & Compton editori, 2005, I, p. 375
- Guida d'Italia, Florence and province "Guida Rossa", Italian Touring Club, Milan 2007.

Claudio Paolini, Vincenzo Vaccaro, Via Cavour, a road to Firenze Capitale, Florence, Polistampa, 2011, pp. 28–31, n. 9

- The memory of the Great War in Tuscany. Monuments to the fallen: Florence and the Province, edited by Lia Brunori, Florence, Polistampa for the Ministry for Cultural Heritage and Activities, Regional Directorate of Tuscany, 2012, pp. 79–80, nn. 22–23
