= Piazza San Lorenzo =

Historic city square in Florence, Italy

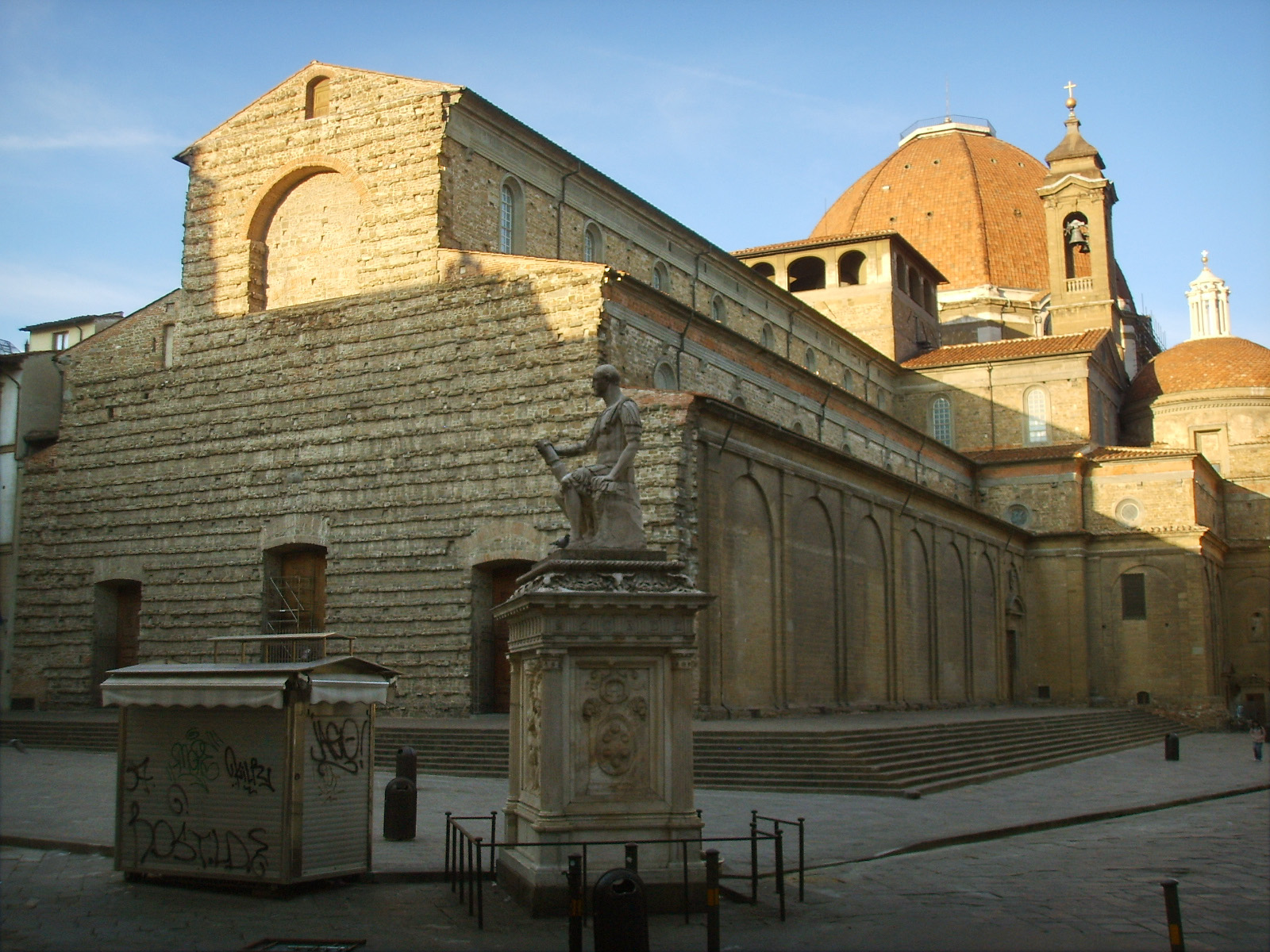
- Basilica of San Lorenzo, Florence

- Location in the municipality of Florence
- Part of: Florence, Italy
- Addresses: San Lorenzo
- Location: Historic Centre of Florence
- Postal code: 50123
- Nearest metro station: autobus (ATAF line C1)
- Coordinates: 43°46′29.18″N 11°15′17.49″E
- Major junctions: Borgo San Lorenzo, Via dell'Ariento, Borgo La Noce, Via de' Ginori,

Construction
- Commissioned: 15th century

Other
- Known for: San Lorenzo, Florence, Monument to Giovanni delle Bande Nere, Florence, Palazzo Della Stufa, alazzo Medici Riccardi, College of Piarists
- Status: Limited traffic zone

Piazza San Lorenzo is a city square in Florence, Italy, with the Basilica of San Lorenzo, Florence situated at the centre.

== History ==
The boundaries of the square have been partially revised over time. The name of the square refers to the basilica of San Lorenzo. Borgo San Lorenzo is a street located between piazza San Giovanni and piazza San Lorenzo.

The basilica is one of the oldest in Florence, having been consecrated in 393 AD, at which time it stood outside the city walls. For three hundred years it was the city's cathedral, before the official seat of the bishop was transferred to Santa Reparata.

The square is frequented by tourists who cross it to access the basilica complex and by the nearby Central Market and souvenir stalls. Since August 2013, the city has started a project to remove the benches aimed both at restoring the historic architecture, and at introducing the passage of a connecting bus between Via Camillo Cavour and the Santa Maria station.

== Structures ==
List of buildings in and around the square.

- Basilica of San Lorenzo, Florence
- Monument to Giovanni delle Bande Nere
- Palazzo Della Stufa
- Palazzo Medici Riccardi
- Collegio degli Scolopi
- Osservatorio Ximeniano

== See also ==
- List of squares in Florence

== Gallery ==
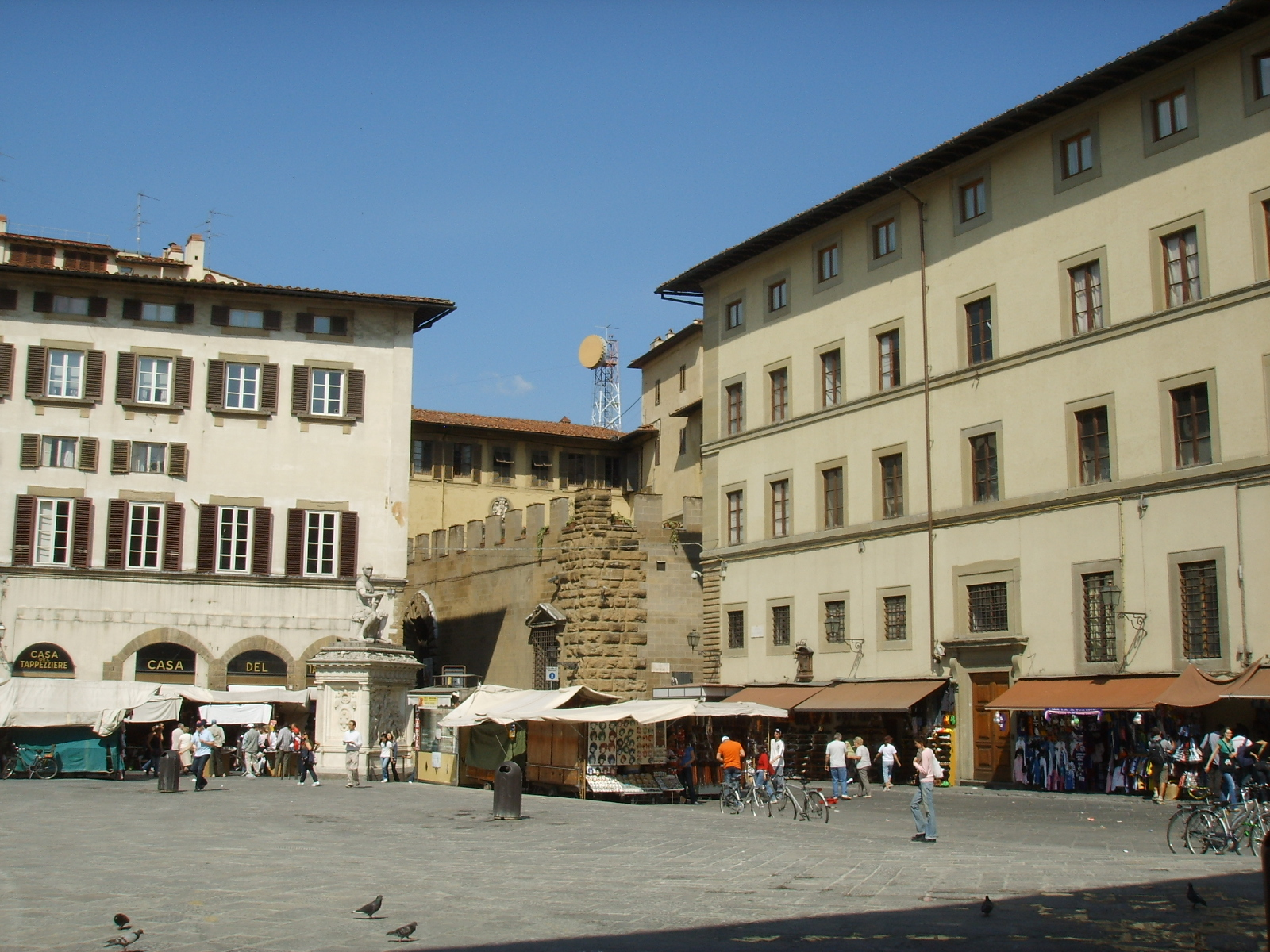
Piazza San Lorenzo

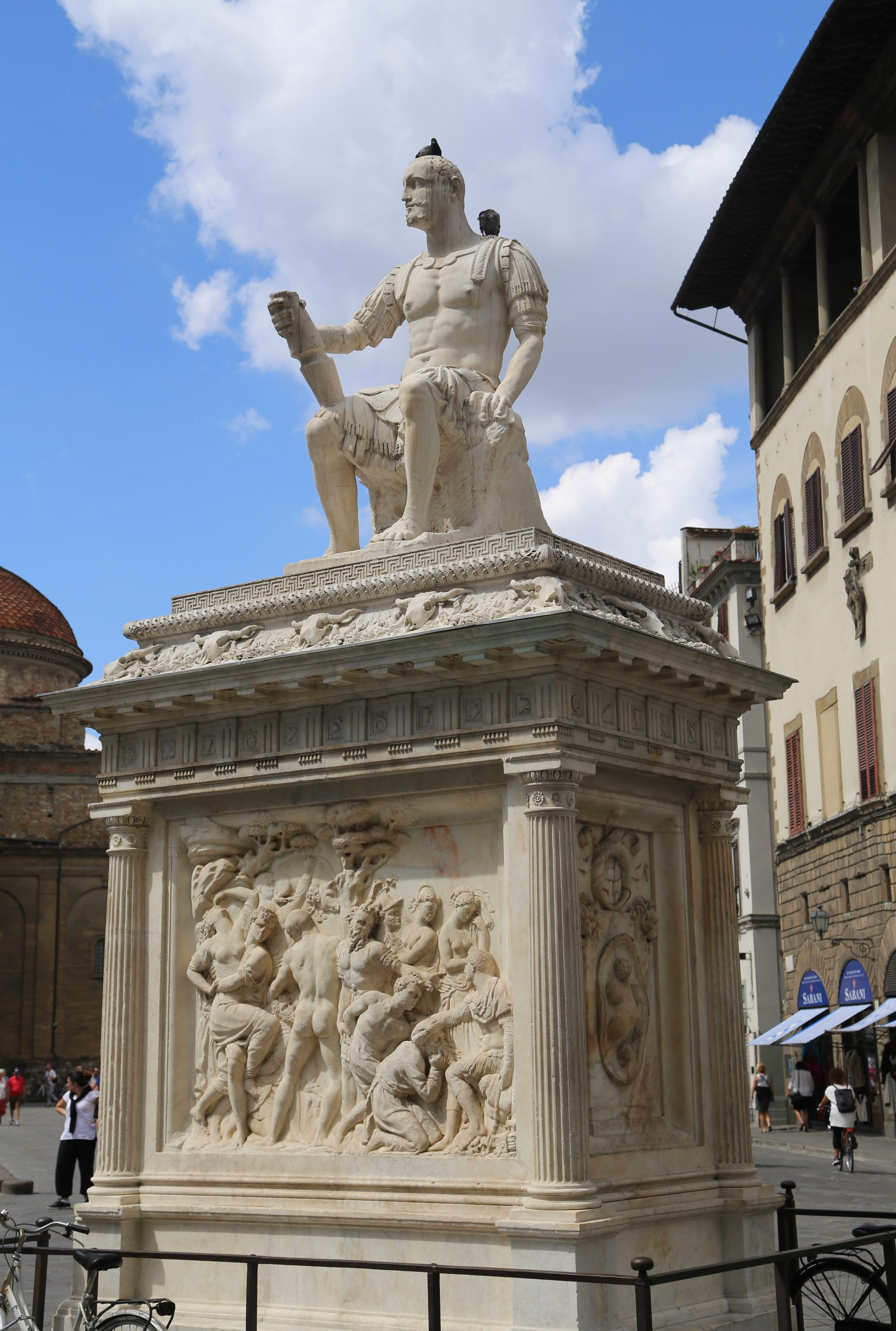
Monument to Giovanni delle Bande Nere

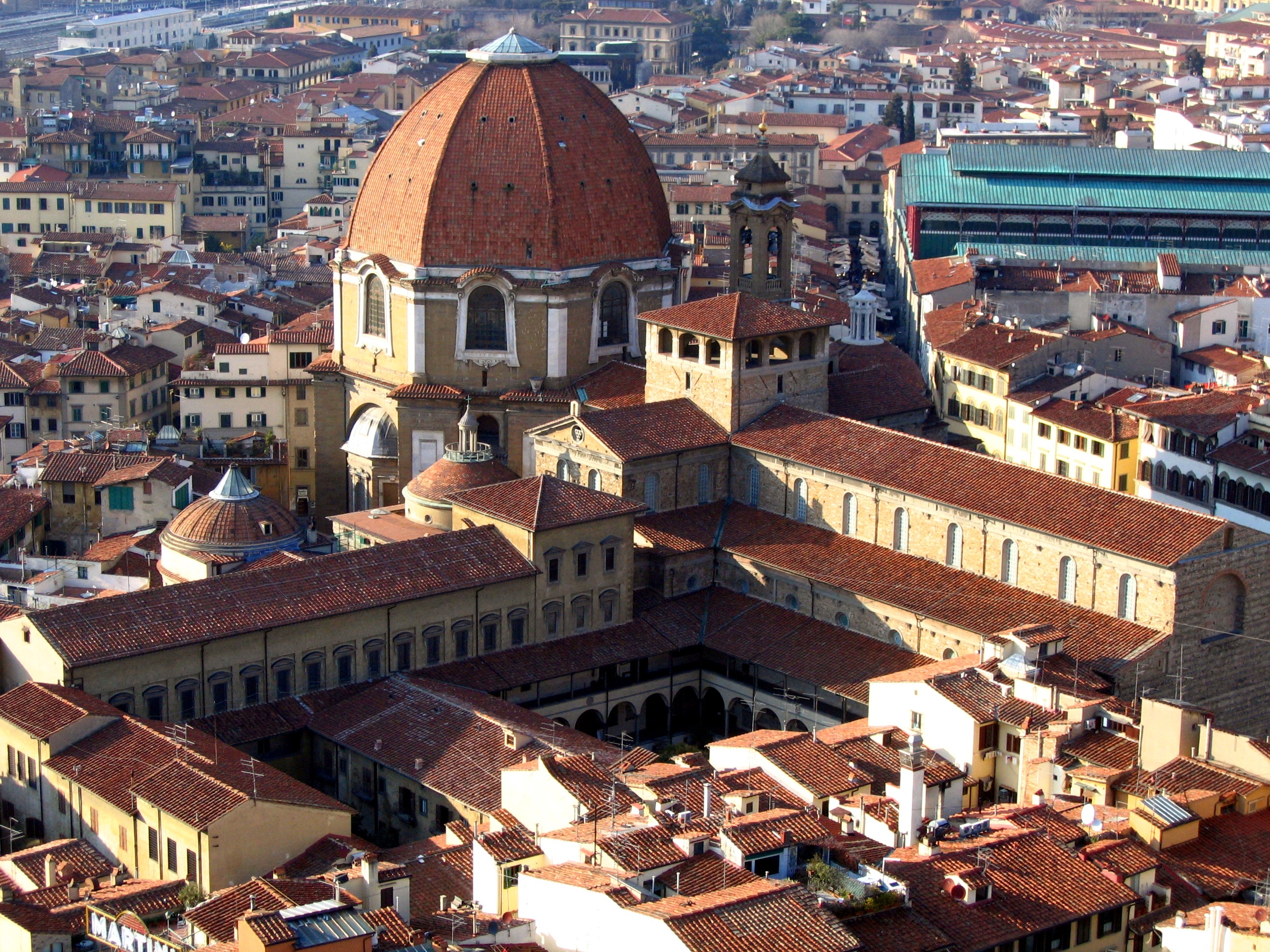
Laurentian Library

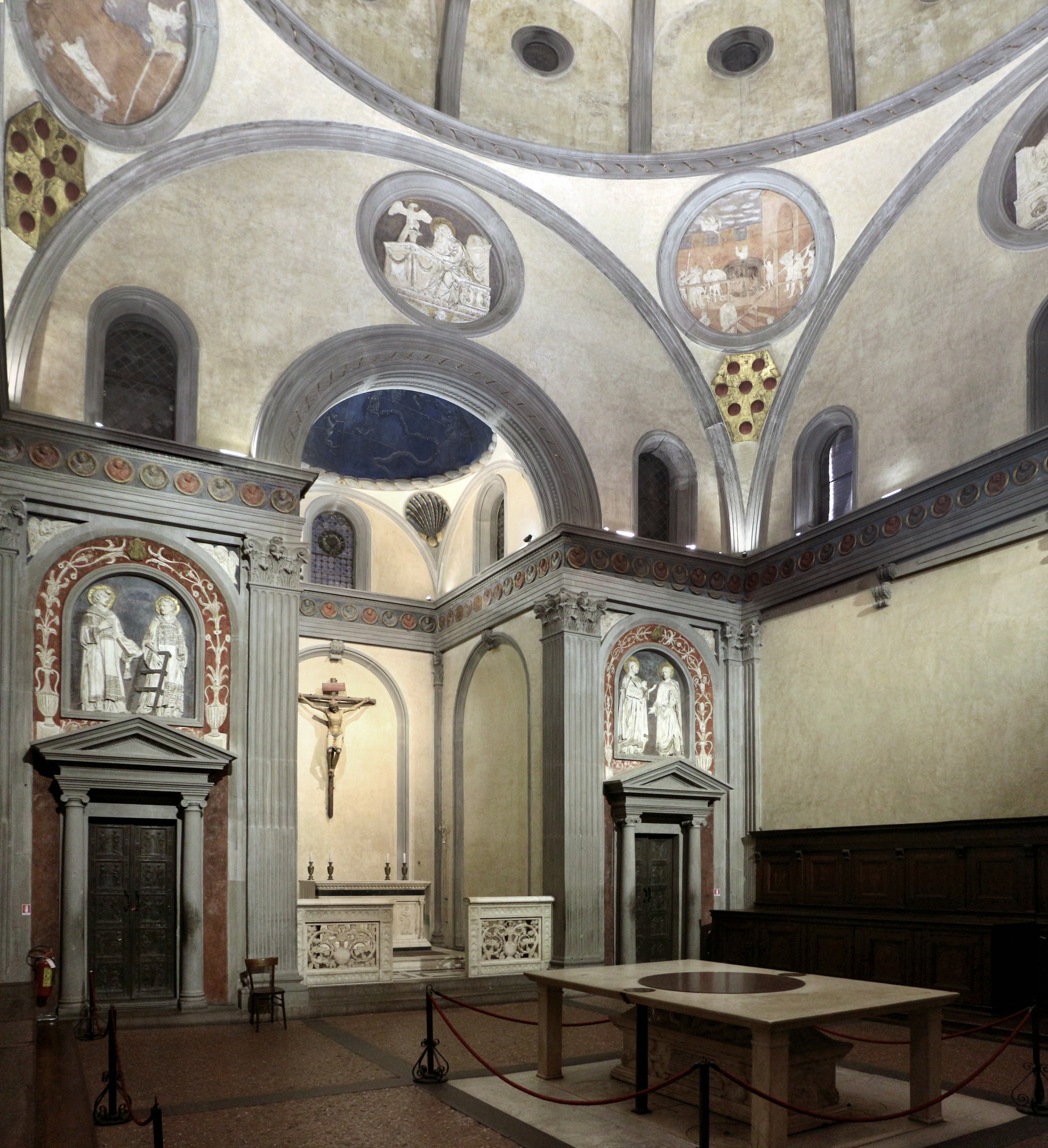
Sagrestia Vecchia

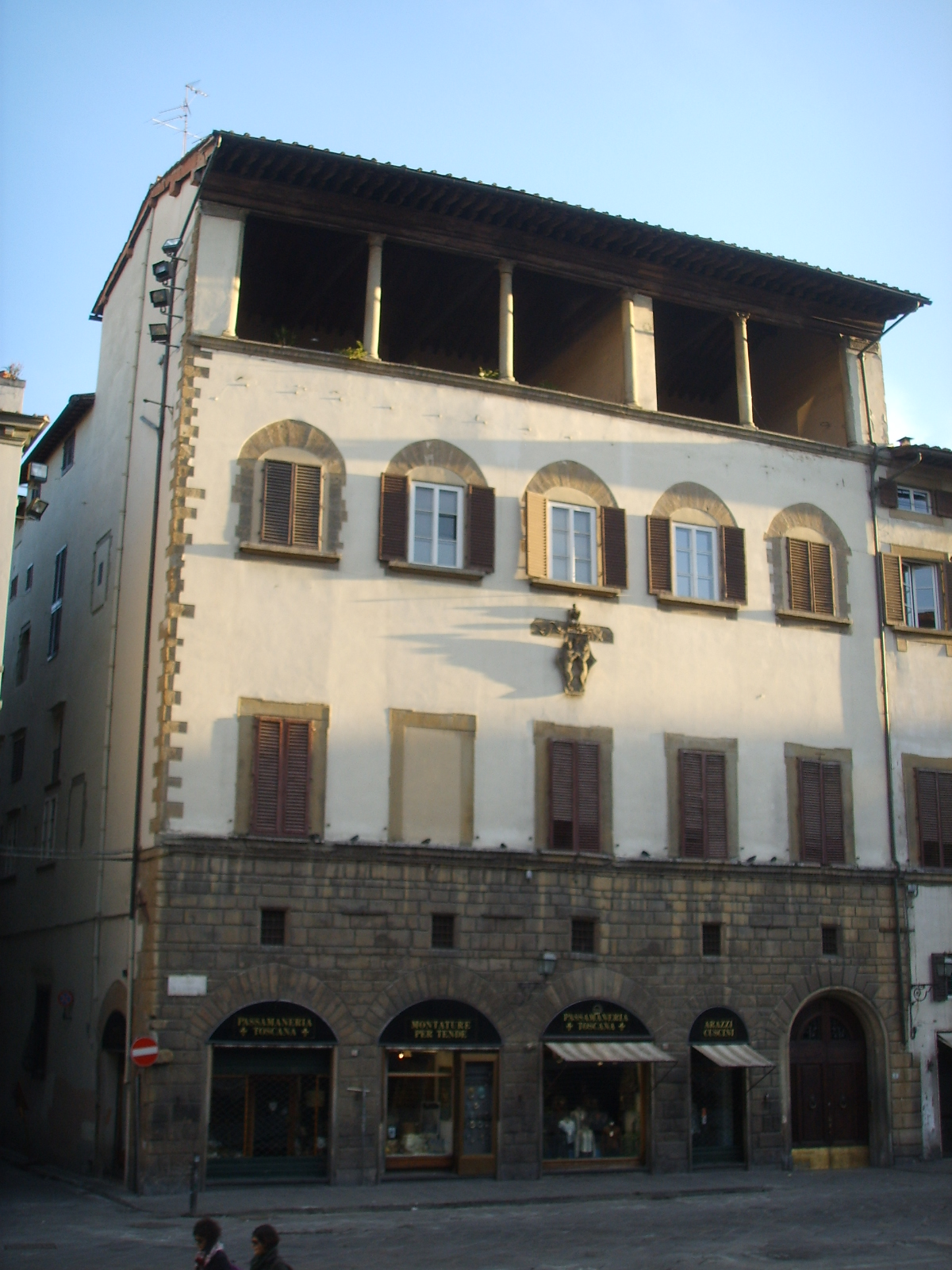
Palazzo Della Stufa

== Bibliography ==
- Municipality of Florence, Historical and administrative road map of the city and the Municipality of Florence, Florence, Tipografia Barbèra, 1913, p. 75, n. 529; p. 132, n. 930 (piazza delle Stimate).
- Piero Bargellini, Ennio Guarnieri, The streets of Florence, 4 vols., Florence, Bonechi, 1977–1978, II, 1977, pp. 156–161.
- Pietro Roselli, Orietta Superchi, The construction of the basilica of San Lorenzo, a story of urban importance, Florence, Clusf Cooperativa Editrice Universitaria, 1980.
- Gabriele Morolli, The Medici square and the buried column, in San Lorenzo 393–1993. Architecture, the history of the factory, catalog of the exhibition (Florence, Basilica of San Lorenzo, 25 September-12 December 1993) edited by Gabriele Morolli and Pietro Ruschi, Florence, Alinea Editrice, 1993, pp. 197–198.
- Francesco Cesati, The great guide to the streets of Florence, Newton Compton Editori, Rome 2003.
