= Piazza del Duomo, Florence =

Square in Florence, Italy

Coordinates: 43°46′22″N 11°15′21″E

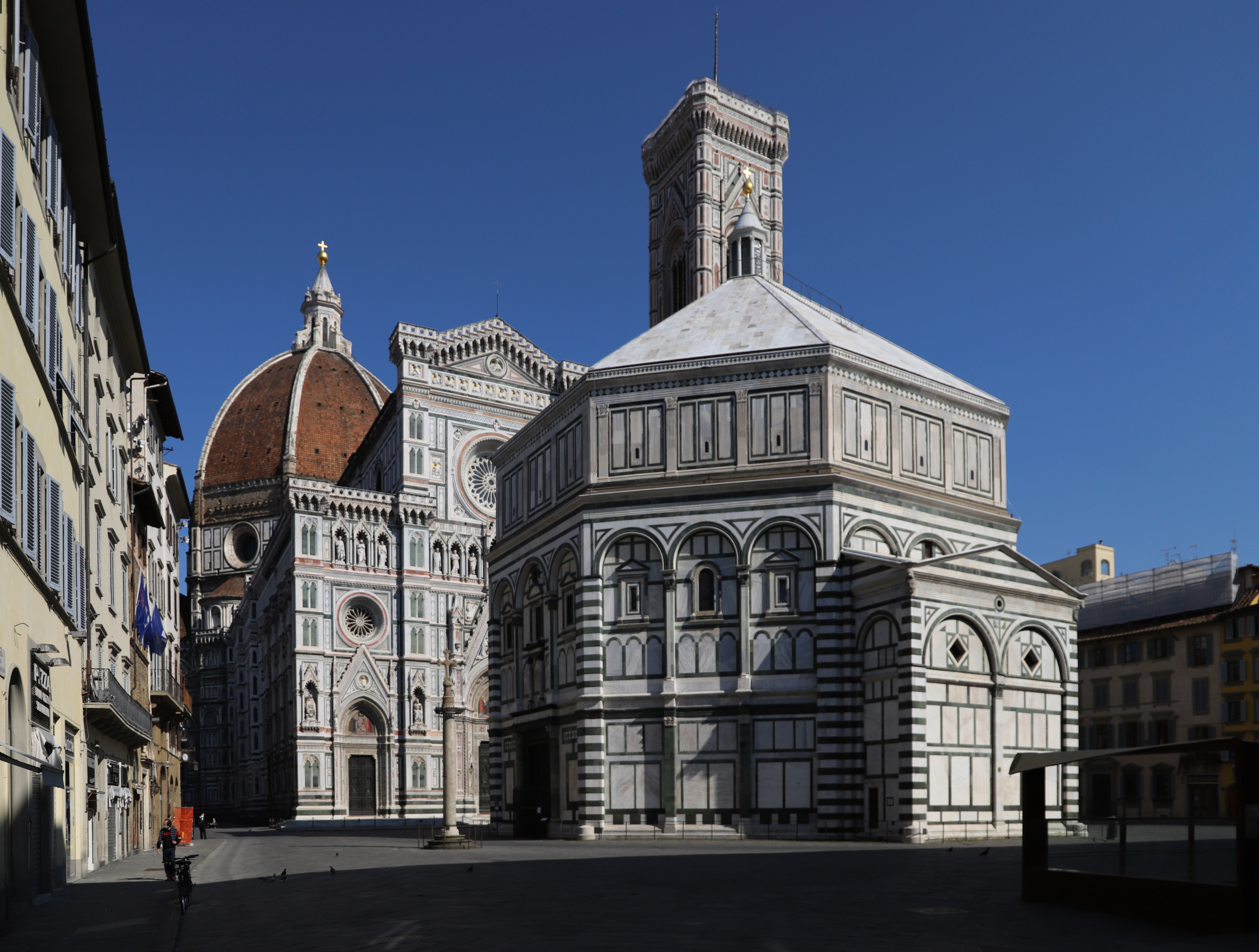
Piazza del Duomo and Piazza San Giovanni, Florence

Piazza del Duomo (English: "Cathedral Square") is located in Florence, Tuscany, Italy. It is one of the most visited places in Europe and the world and in Florence, the most visited area of the city. The Piazza del Duomo is part of the Historic Centre of Florence, which was inscribed as a UNESCO World Heritage Site in 1982. The designation recognizes the square's outstanding value for its concentration of religious and civic monuments—including the Florence Cathedral (Santa Maria del Fiore), the Baptistery of San Giovanni, and Giotto's Campanile—which reflect the political, economic, and artistic achievements of Florence during the Renaissance.

== Buildings ==
Panoramic view of Piazza del Duomo, Florence.
- Santa Maria del Fiore Cathedral: Is the largest building in medieval Europe, and is the fourth church of Europe by size, its length is 153 m (501.97 ft) and its height is 116 m (380.58 ft). The Dome was designed by Filippo Brunelleschi.
- Giotto's Bell Tower: Standing adjacent the Basilica of Santa Maria del Fiore and the Baptistery of St. John, the tower is one of the showpieces of the Florentine Gothic architecture with its design by Giotto, its rich sculptural decorations and the poly-chrome marble encrustations.
- Baptistery of St. John: The octagonal Baptistery stands across from the Duomo cathedral and the Giotto bell tower (Campanile di Giotto). It is one of the oldest buildings in the city, built between 1059 and 1128. The architecture is in Florentine Romanesque style.
- Museo dell'Opera del Duomo: in front of the Florence Cathedral, it is committed to the conservation of the Duomo and other art works. It stores great masterpieces of Michelangelo, Donatello, Lorenzo Ghiberti, Luca della Robbia, Arnolfo di Cambio and many others.
- Loggia del Bigallo
- Venerabile Arciconfraternita della Misericordia
- Palazzo dei Canonici
- Palazzo Strozzi di Mantova
- Torrini Museum
- Palazzo Arcivescovile
- Torre dei Marignolli
- Opera di San Giovanni
- San Zanobi Column, beside the Baptistery.

== See also ==
- Florence
- Squares of Florence
