= Monument to Giovanni delle Bande Nere, Florence =

Monument to Giovanni delle Bande Nere
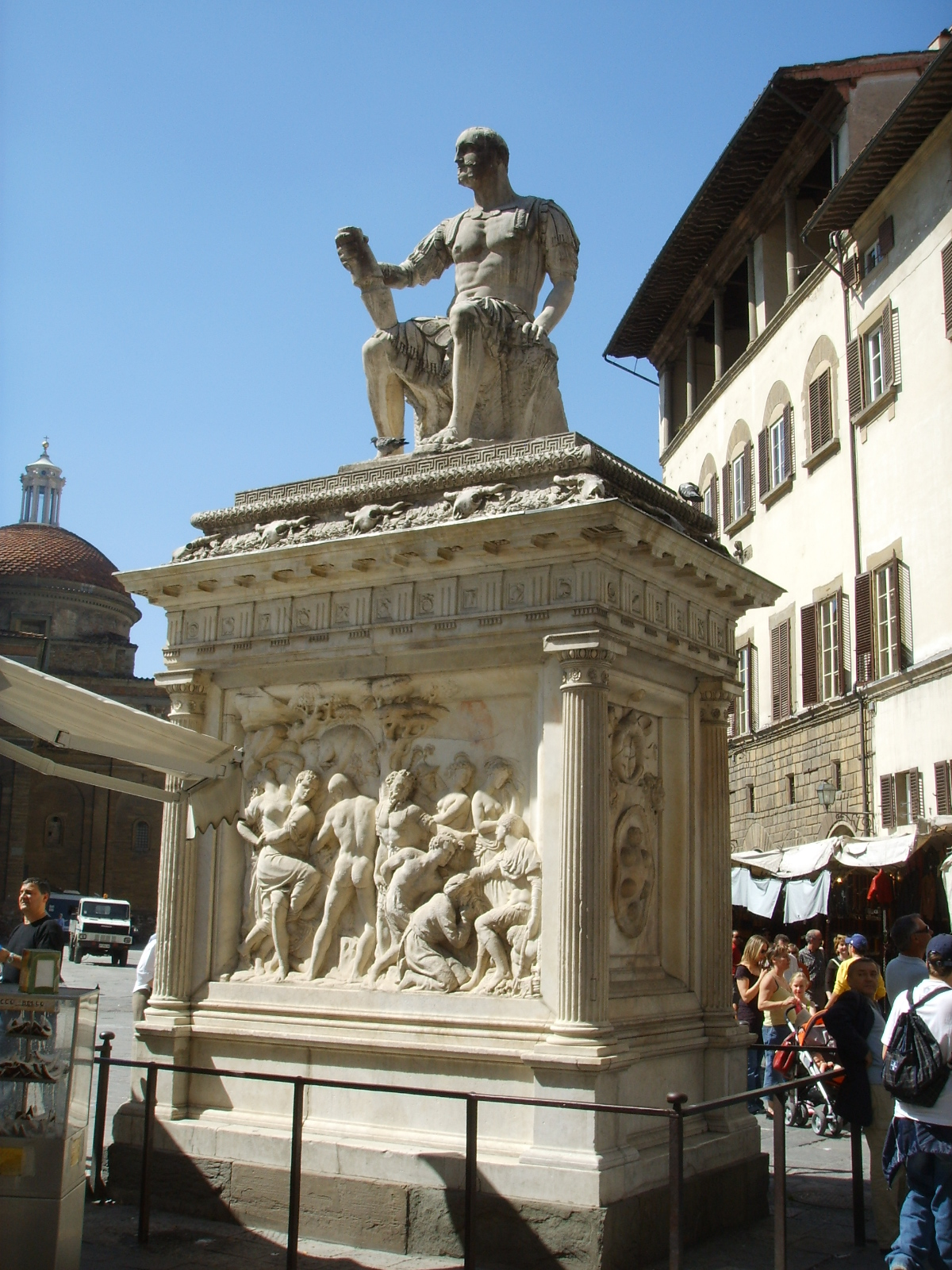
- Monument Giovanni delle Bande Nere, Florence
- 43°46′30.04″N 11°15′17.88″E
- Location: Piazza San Lorenzo in Florence, Tuscany, Italy
- Designer: Baccio Bandinelli
- Material: marble
- Beginning date: 1540
- Completion date: 1560
- Dedicated to: Giovanni delle Bande Nere

The Monument to Giovanni delle Bande Nere is an Italian Renaissance sculpture in marble, by Baccio Bandinelli and his workshop, now in Piazza San Lorenzo in Florence, Tuscany, Italy. The work took from 1540 to after 1560 to carve, and the base and statue, though always meant to be together, were only so placed in 1850.

The imposing Giovanni sits, somewhat uncomfortably, wearing a metallic cuirass on his torso. Without a helmet or army boots, he holds a baton of command on his knee. The plinth is almost more decorative with festoons and bucranium, and Doric columns at the corners. One bas-relief appears to show soldiers bringing booty and captives before a sitting ruler. Others depict the Medici coat of arms. The corners have doric pilaster-columns.

== History ==
The statue was originally commissioned by Cosimo I de Medici in 1540 to commemorate his father, Giovanni delle Bande Nere (1498–1526), the successful condottiero from the Medici family. The sculptor was Baccio Bandinelli. The statue however was controversial from the start: it was debated whether a depiction of an armed soldier should serve as a monument in a church, however even if it was not displayed in a church, it was debated if it was appropriate for a warrior like Giovanni, who had marched against foes most of his life, to be immortalized while sitting down.

The contract called for completion of the statue and bas-reliefs within two years, but upon Bandinelli's death in 1560, the latter remained unfinished. The statue itself found a home in the large Hall of the Palazzo Vecchio, but the base remained in the Neroni Chapel of the Basilica of San Lorenzo. In 1620, Cosimo II de Medici had the base or plinth moved to the Piazza where it stands. In 1812, Giuseppe Del Rosso created a fountain around it, with lion heads intermingled with Medici coat of arms. The statue of Giovanni delle Bande, however, was only placed on the plinth in 1850, under work directed by the engineer Alessandro Manetti. A satiric ditty from the occasion claimed:

Sir Giovanni delle Bande Nere (Messer Giovanni delle Bande Nere)
from a long ride weary and tired (dal lungo cavalcar noiato e stanco)
dismounts from saddle, and settles on seat. (scese di sella e si pose a sedere)

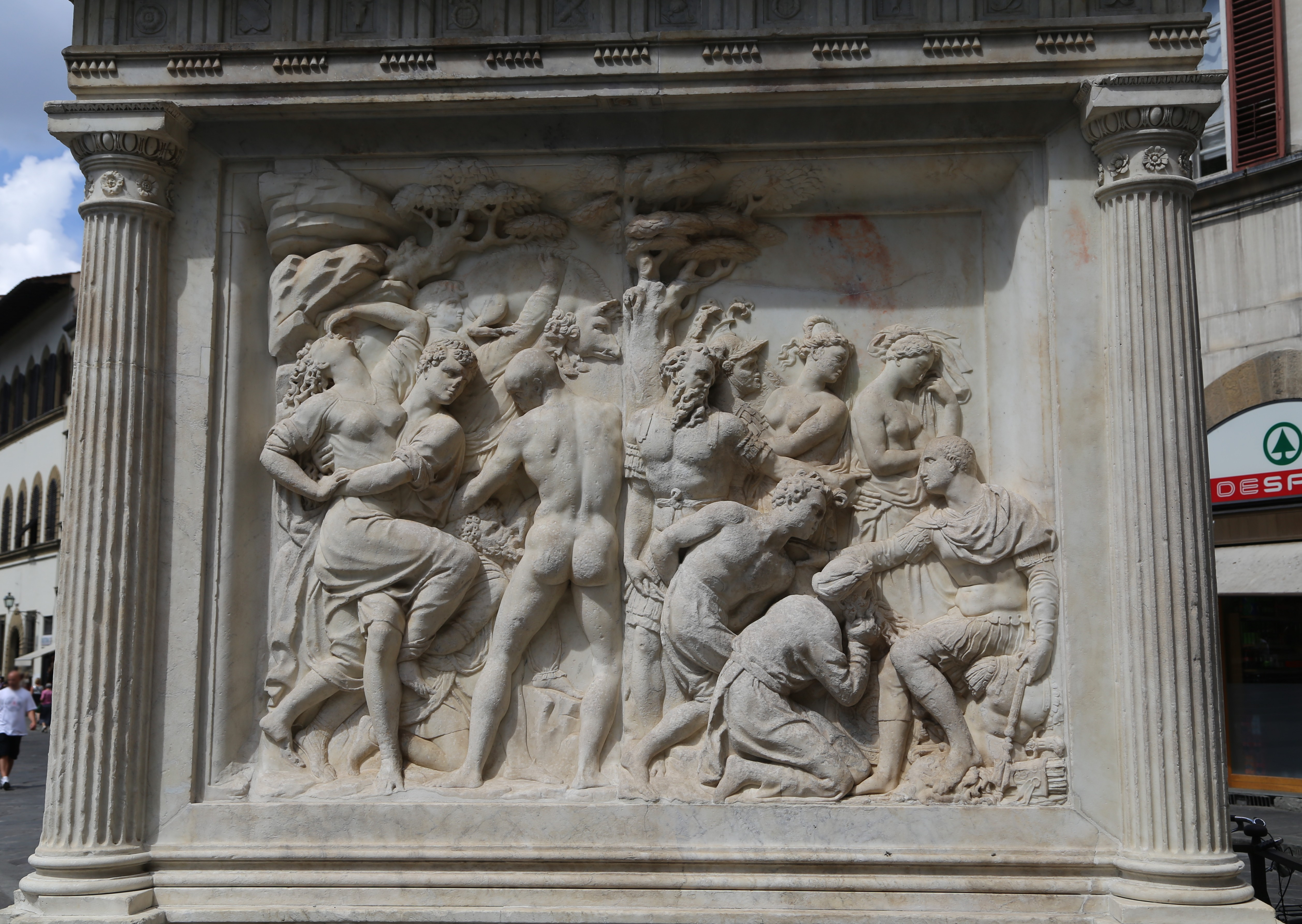
Bas relief of Base of San Lorenzo

The 19th-century plaque reads in translation:One part of this monument/ destined by Cosimo I/ to honor the memory of his father/ Giovanni delle Bande Nere/ by no choice stood/ and commonly called the Base of San Lorenzo/ Restored in 1850/ and made to host the statue of the great captain/ becoming finally complete the prized work/ sculpted by Bandinelli. The long excuse gave rise to a contemporary joke that the statue was dedicated to Great Captain Becoming (Gran Capitano Ebbe).
