= Osservatorio Ximeniano =

Ximenian Observatory
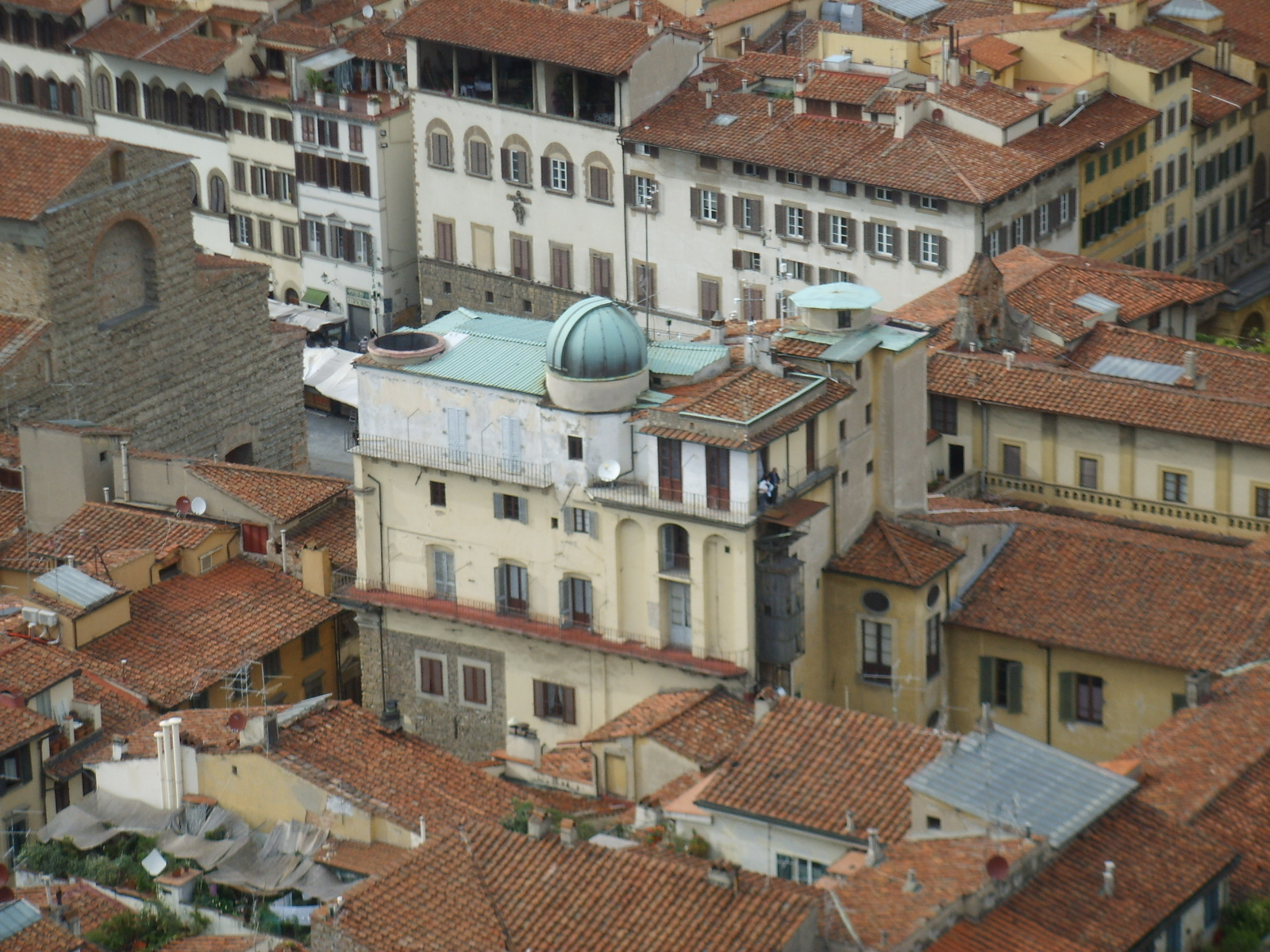
- Alternative names: Ximeniano
- Named after: Leonardo Ximenes
- Location: Florence, Metropolitan City of Florence, Tuscany, Italy
- Coordinates: 43°46′28″N 11°15′19″E
- Established: 1756
- Website: www.ximeniano-firenze.it/,%20http://brunelleschi.imss.fi.it/itinerari/luogo/OsservatorioXimeniano.html
- Location of Osservatorio Ximeniano
- Related media on Commons

The Osservatorio Ximeniano is an independent measurement and research building specializing in meteorology and geophysics. It is based in Florence, in a part of the former Collegio degli Scolopi, with access from Piazza San Lorenzo. It is named after Leonardo Ximenes.

== History ==
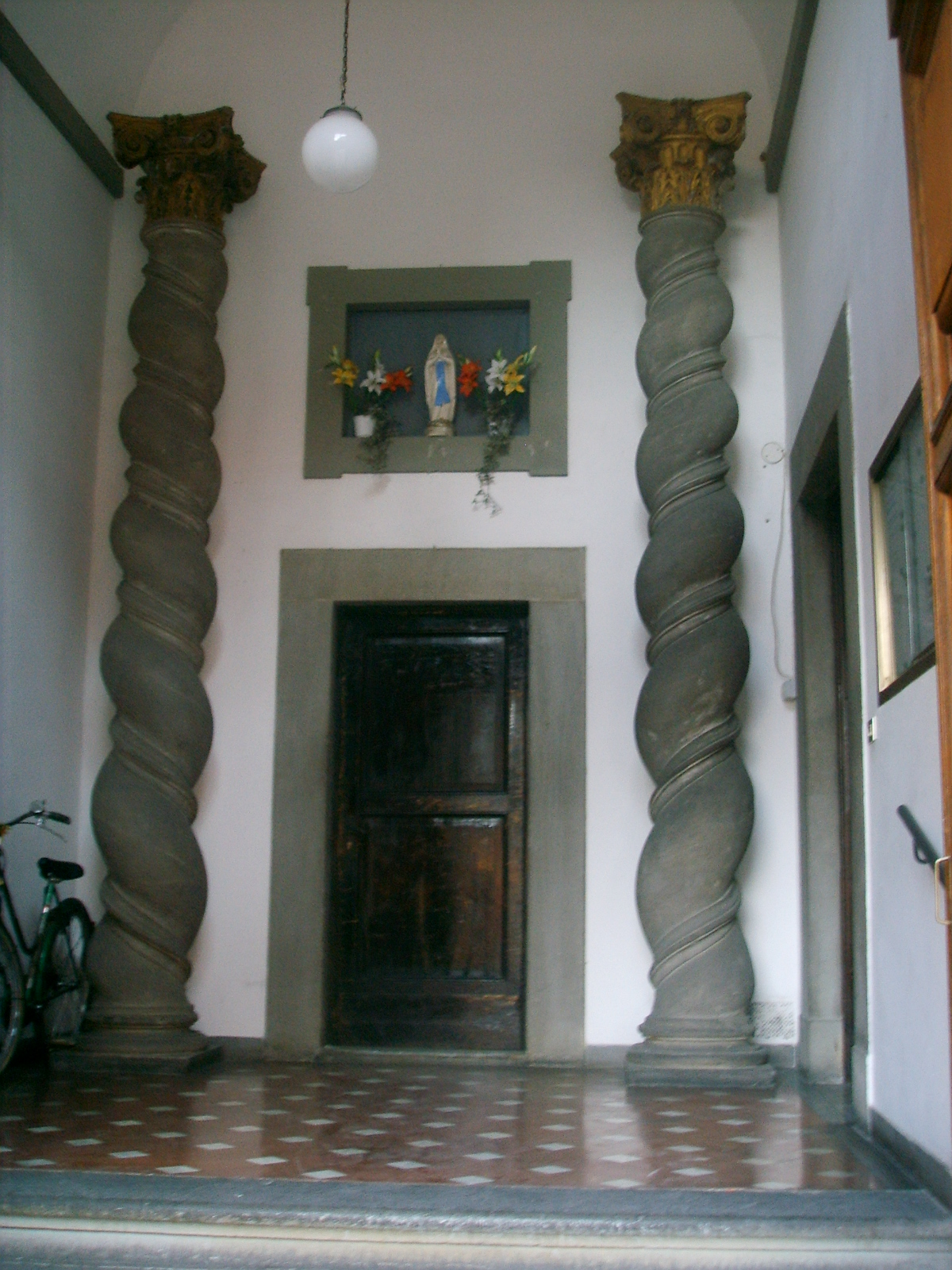
Ximenian Observatory entrance

Founded by the Jesuit from Trapani Leonardo Ximenes in 1756, it is still active today in the same premises where it was born, on the top floor of the Convent of the Scolopi Fathers known as San Giovannino in Florence. The Observatory houses a station of the National Seismic Network of the National Institute of Geophysics and Volcanology.

At the time of its birth, the Observatory was mainly devoted to the study of astronomy and hydraulics, the predominant interests of Ximenes. Upon the temporary suppression of the Society of Jesus in 1773, the laboratory was entrusted to the Scolopi fathers, who still manage it, and who directed the laboratory towards meteorological and seismographic studies; mathematical and cartographic studies, which also led the laboratory to produce works of great importance, such as some of the first geographical maps (such as the Geometric Map of Tuscany prepared in 1830 by Giovanni Inghirami), made with modern criteria, gradually lost their importance, in favor of an ever greater importance dedicated to seismology. A characteristic that the observatory has never abandoned is that of the criterion of applicability to the territory of the studies pursued there.

The Observatory houses two specialized libraries, one ancient and one modern, rooms for measuring equipment and numerous historical collections (especially instruments for radio transmissions, astronomical and meteorological observations, seismological instruments), arranged in such a way as to be able to be used as a historical-didactic path. There is also a reproduction of the first internal combustion engine in history, by Barsanti Matteucci. The premises contain some important paintings from the Florentine sixteenth and seventeenth centuries, albeit in poorly valued locations, near the stairwell. Among these are Giovanni Bizzelli's Sant'Elena (1587), San Girolamo supported by an angel, among the masterpieces of Jacopo Ligozzi, and an Immaculate Conception by Francesco Curradi.

The building also incorporates the ancient Torre dei Rondinelli, at the top of which the Observatory tower has been obtained, with the typical dome, clearly visible from the whole city.

== The collection ==
The Astronomical Collection is dedicated to the founder Leonardo Ximenes, astronomer, mathematician and hydraulic engineer trusted by the Medici, and to his immediate successors; telescopes, compasses, telescopes, theodolites, geodetic instruments, etc. are exhibited. The route culminates in the Telescope roundabout.

The Cecchi Collection preserves the seismographs built and used in the observatory starting from 1873, constituting a sort of guide to the history of seismology. Many of the tools, although obsolete, are still functional.

Likewise, the Meteorological Collection includes measuring instruments largely made in the observatory itself and in use since 1813. Meteorological observations, carried out with modern instruments, are still used as a basis for the averages of the city of Florence.

== Climatological data ==
Meteorological data can be found since 1813. The extreme temperature values recorded throughout the entire historical series were -12.9 °C on 30 December 1849 and +41.6 °C on 26 July 1983.

Between 1813 and 1900 the highest temperature was +40.0 °C and was recorded on August 13, 1861; between 1901 and 2010 the lowest temperature was -11.0 °C and was recorded on 11 January 1985.

== Bibliography ==
- Guido Alfani, The Ximenian Observatory and its scientific material, Pavia, Tip. next f.lli Fusi, 1910.
- S. Ferrighi, The Ximenian Observatory of Florence, Brescia, Morcelliana, 1932.
- E. Borchi, R. Macii, M. Parisi, The barometer, history and applications in the Ximenian Observatory, Florence, Ximenian Observatory, 1990.
- D. Bravieri, C. Holtz, The Ximenian Observatory of Florence, Florence, Ximenian Observatory, 1993.

== See also ==
- List of astronomical observatories
- Leonardo Ximenes
