= List of squares in Florence =

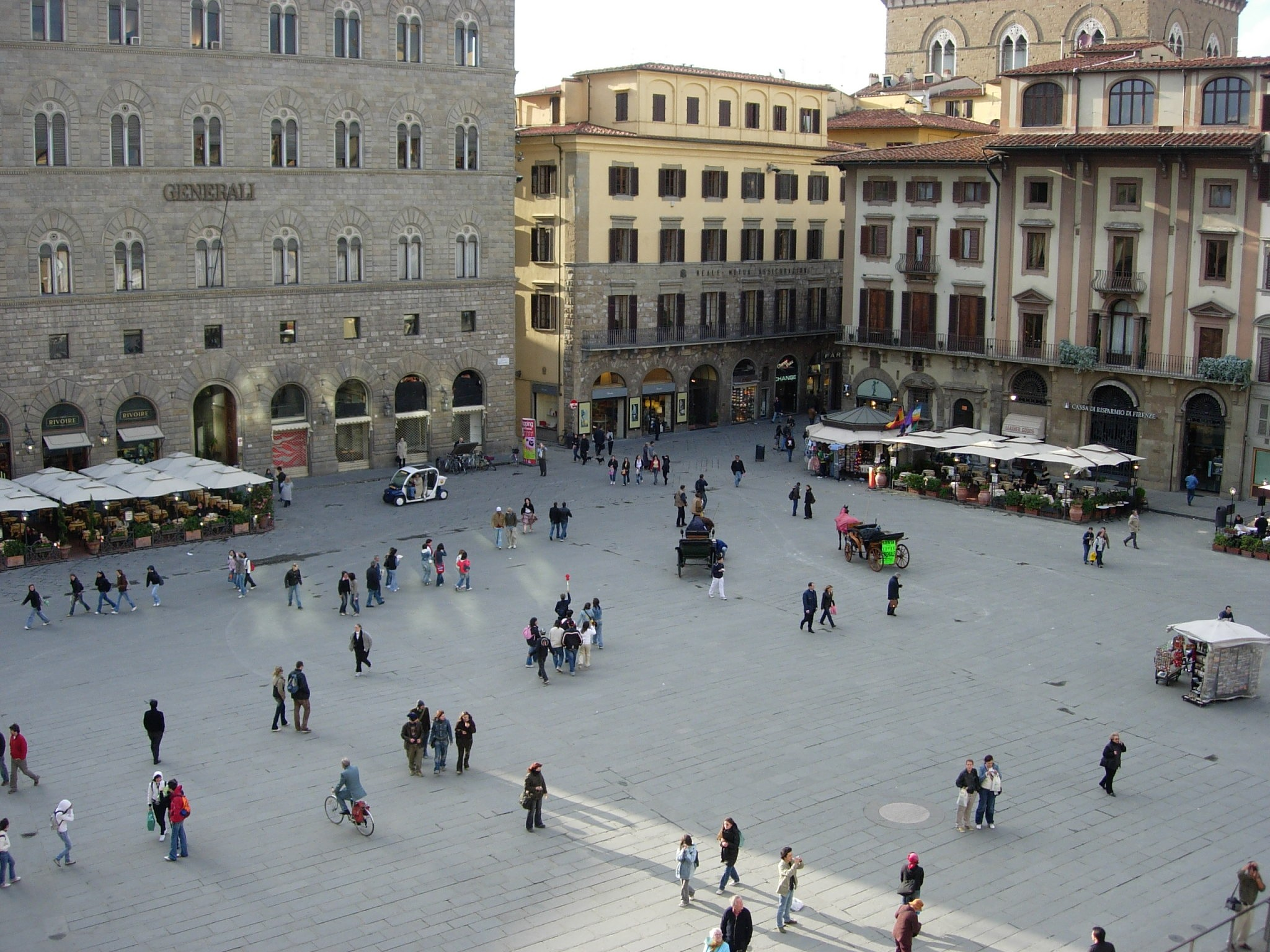
Piazza della Signoria

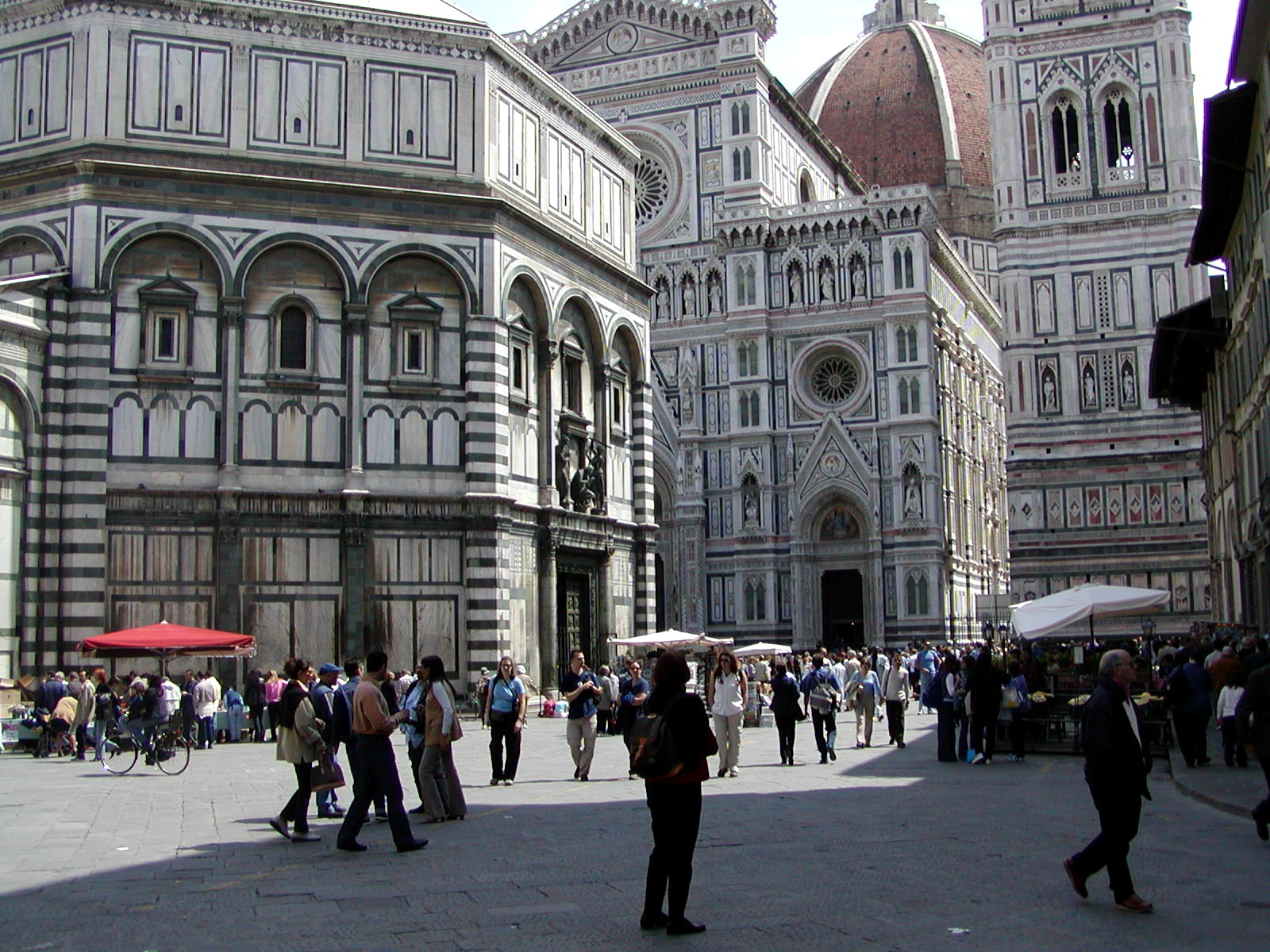
Piazza del Duomo

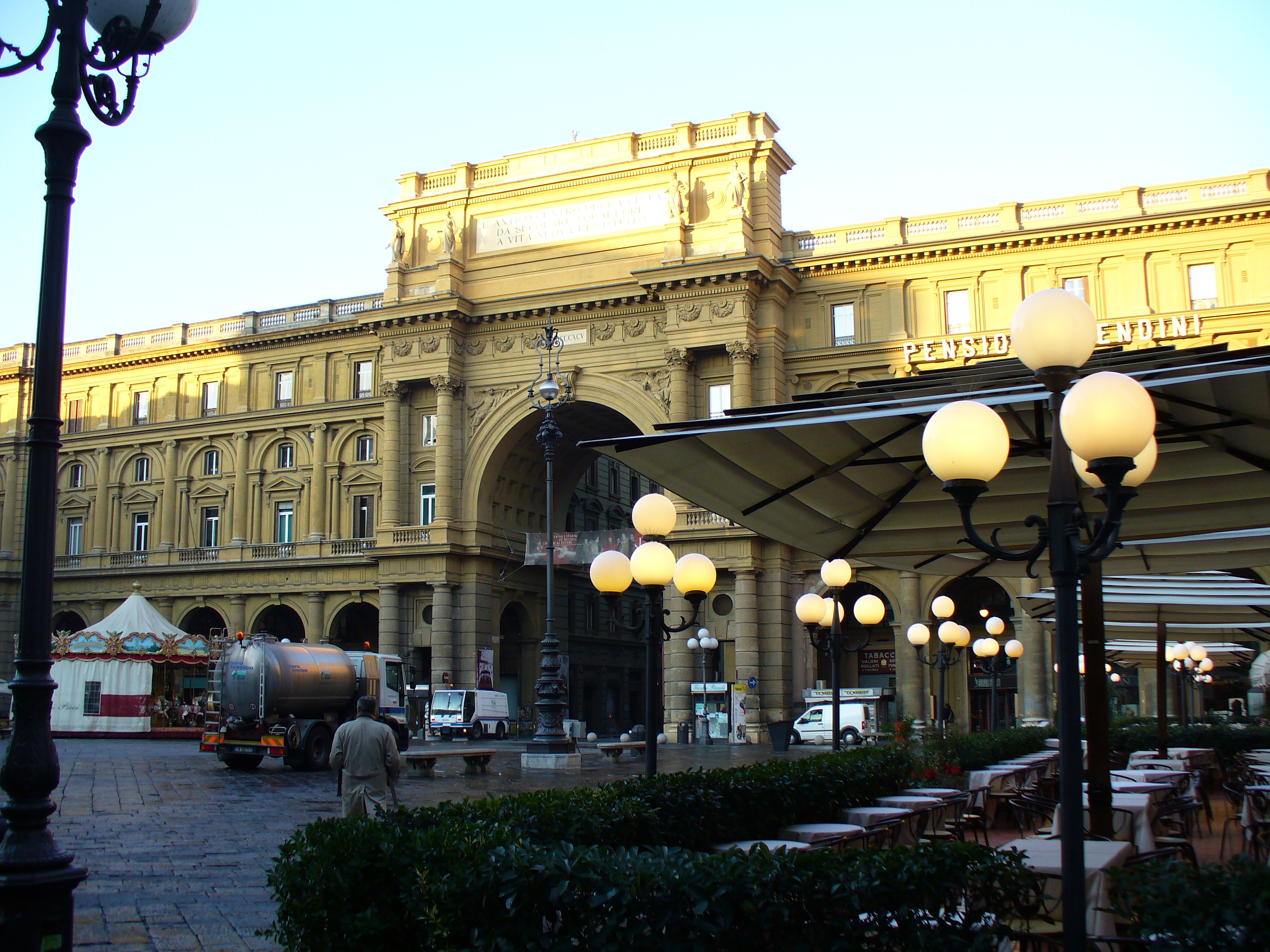
Piazza della Repubblica

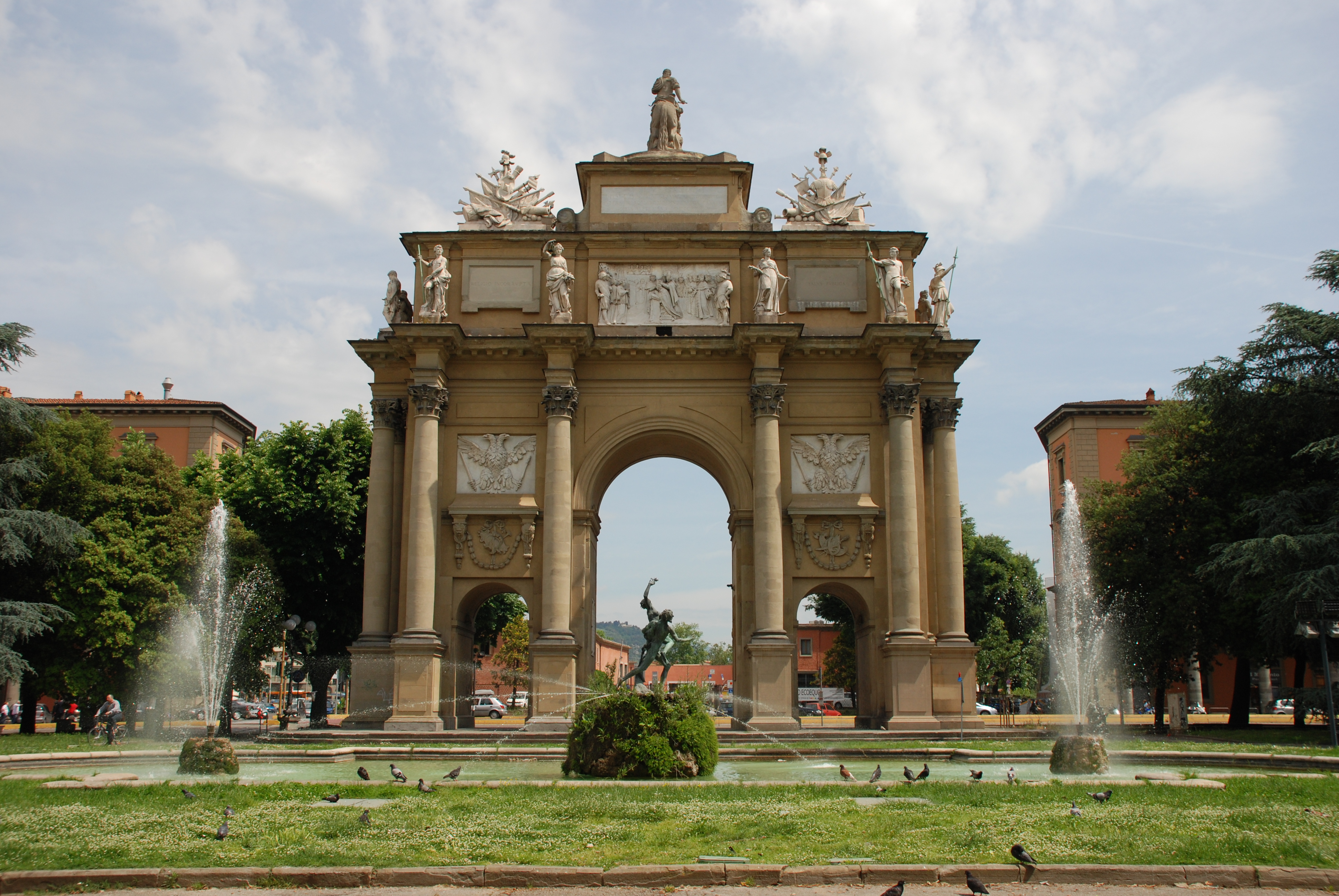
Piazza della Libertà

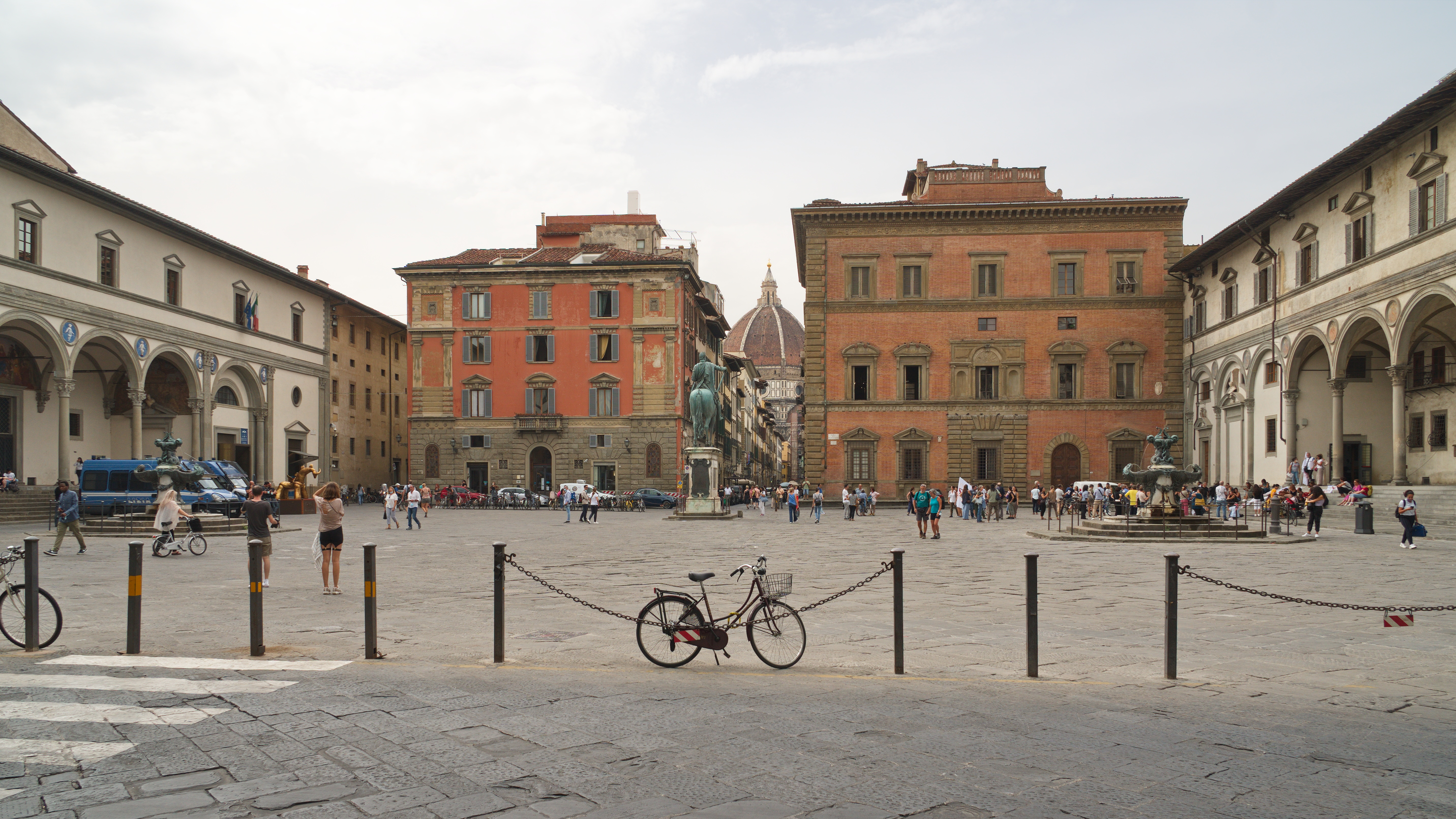
Piazza SS Annunziata

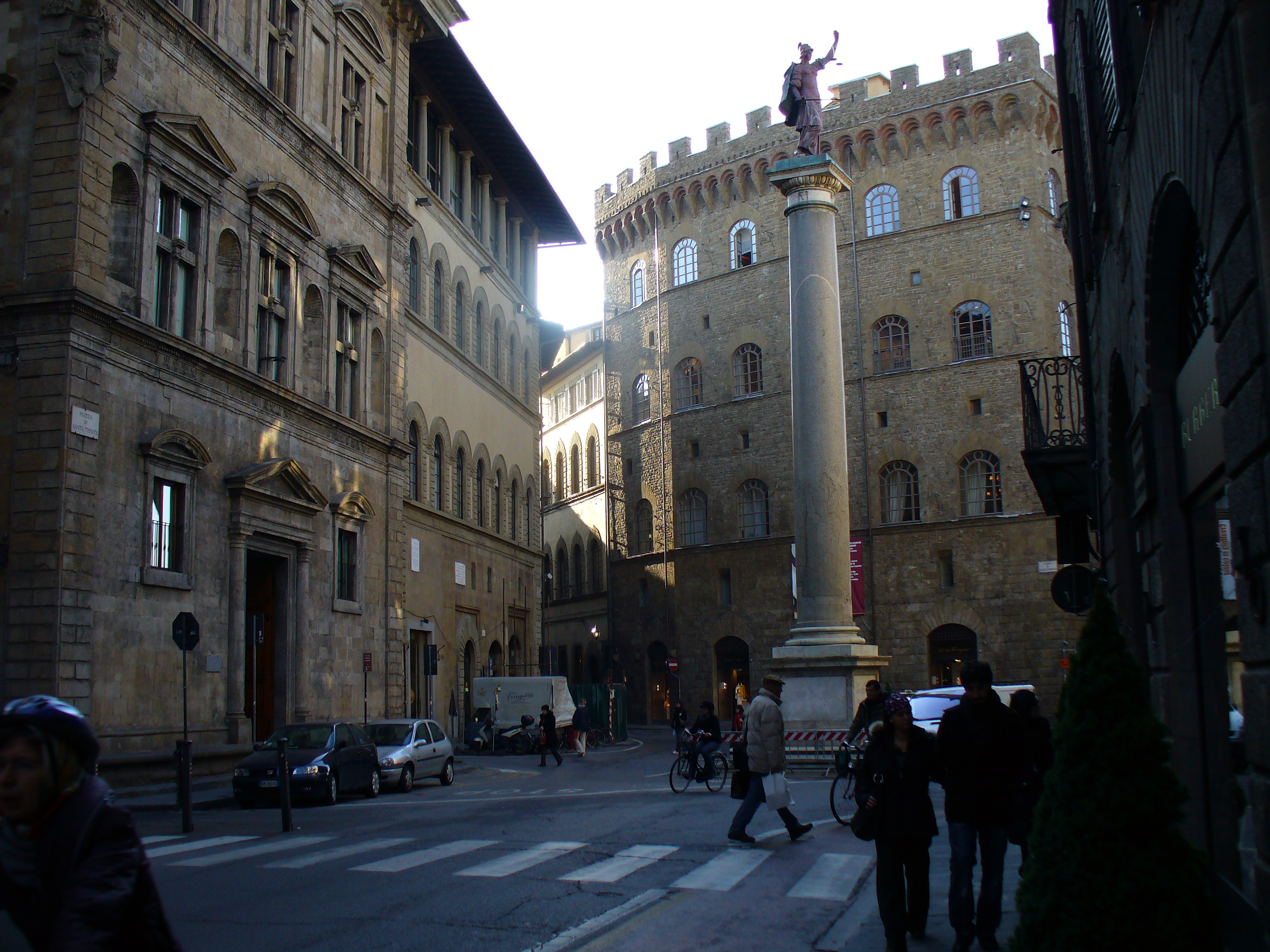
Piazza Santa Trinita

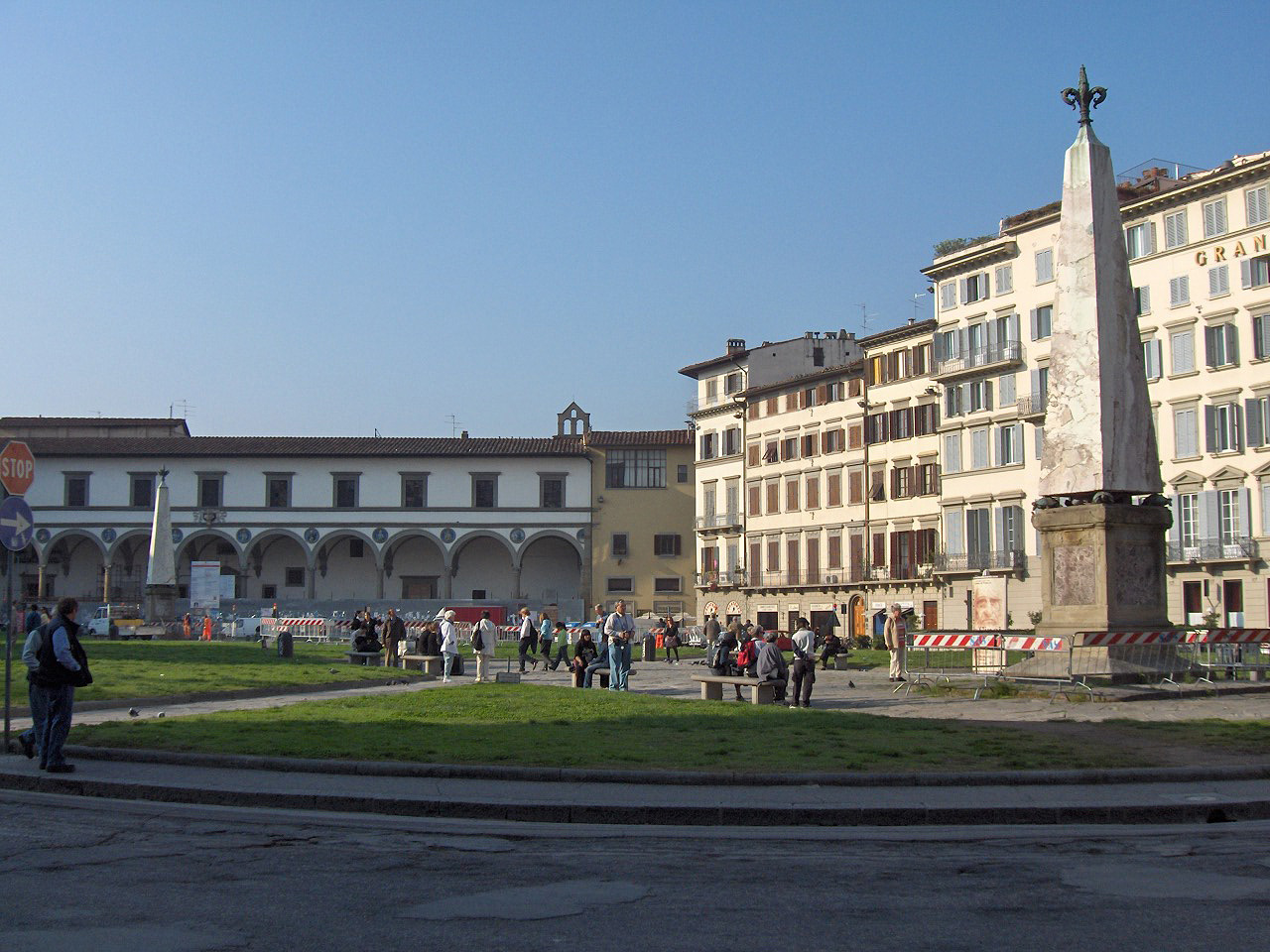
Piazza Santa Maria Novella

Piazza Santa Croce

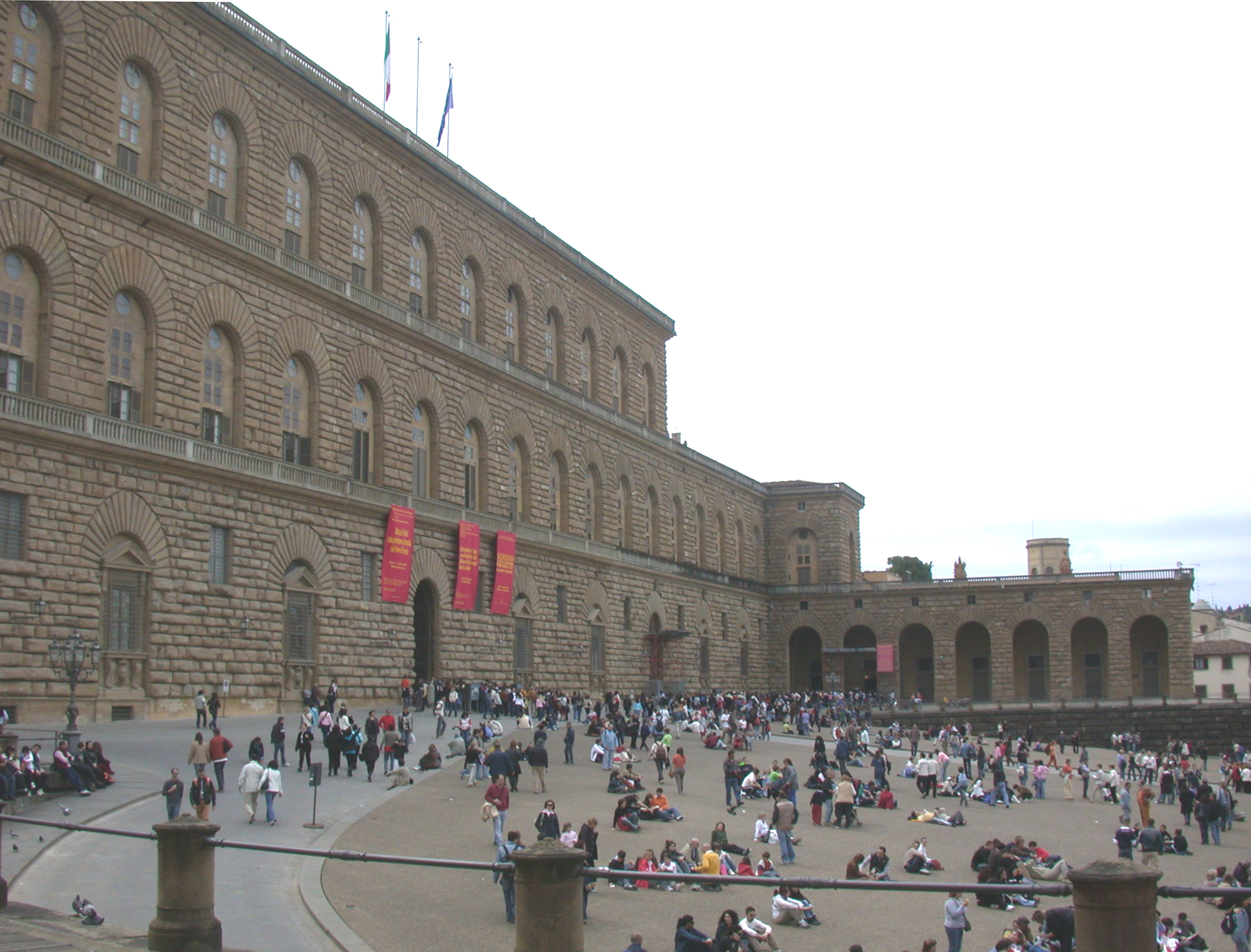
Piazza de' Pitti

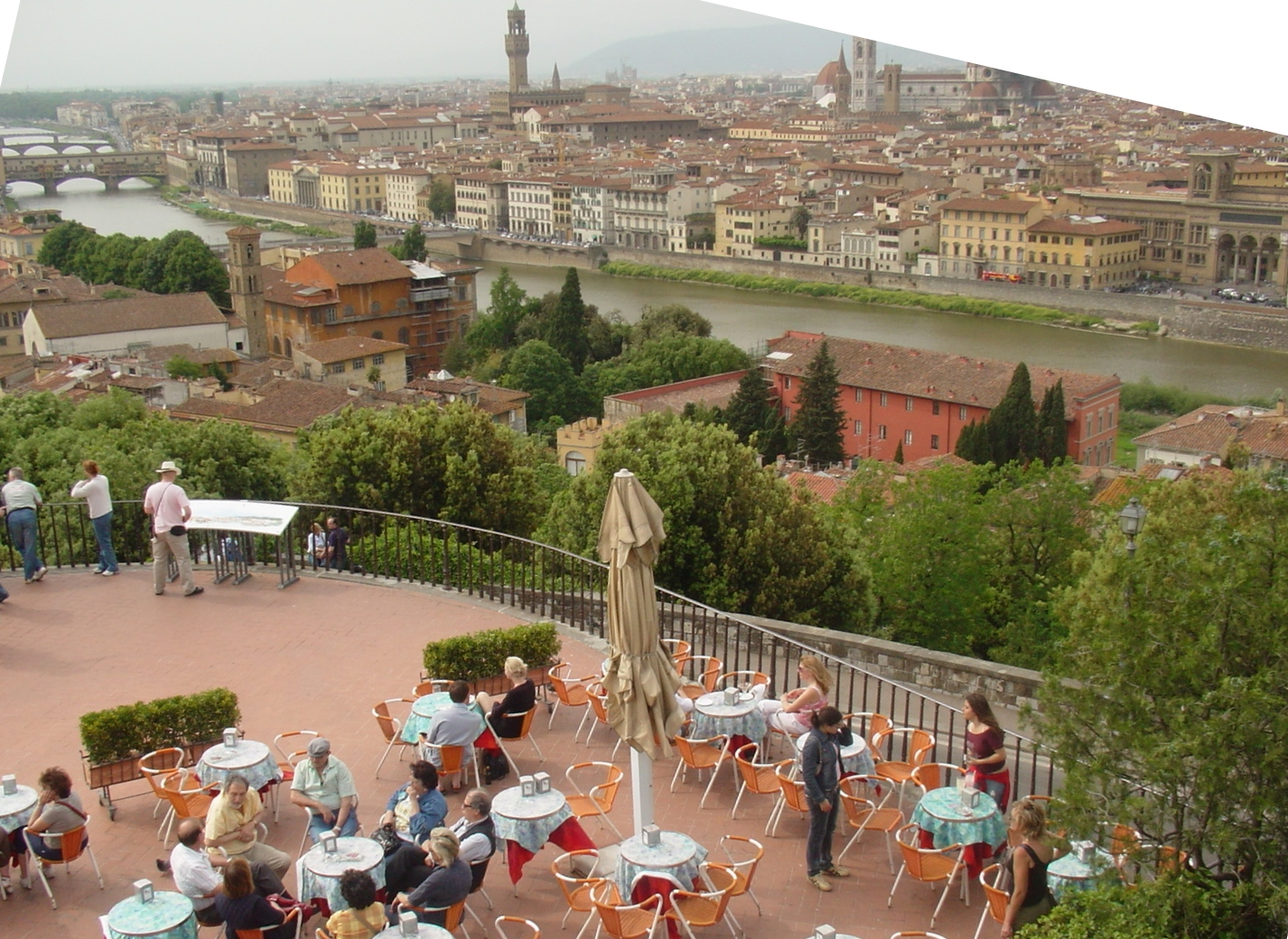
View from Piazzale Michelangelo

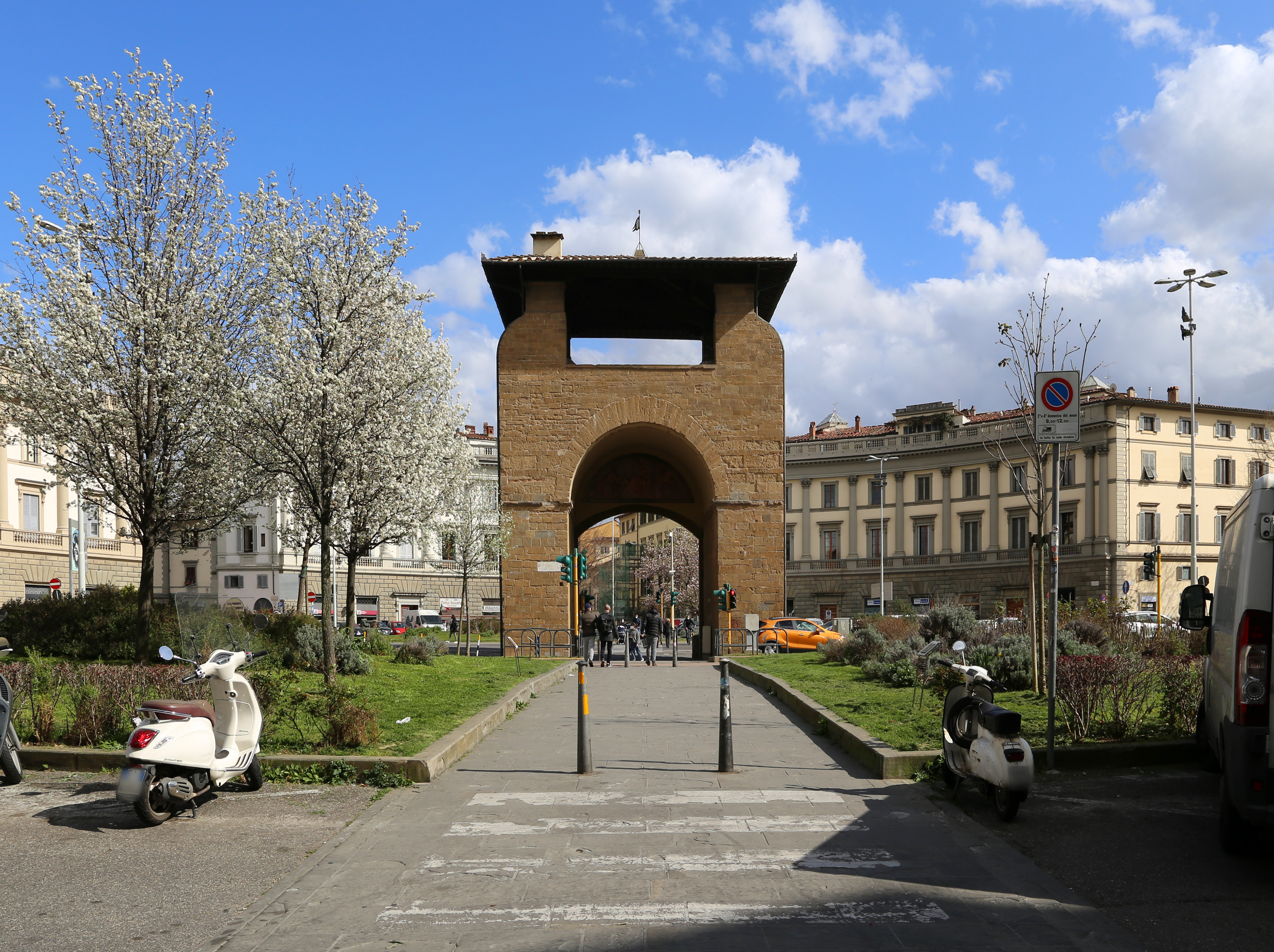
Piazza Beccaria

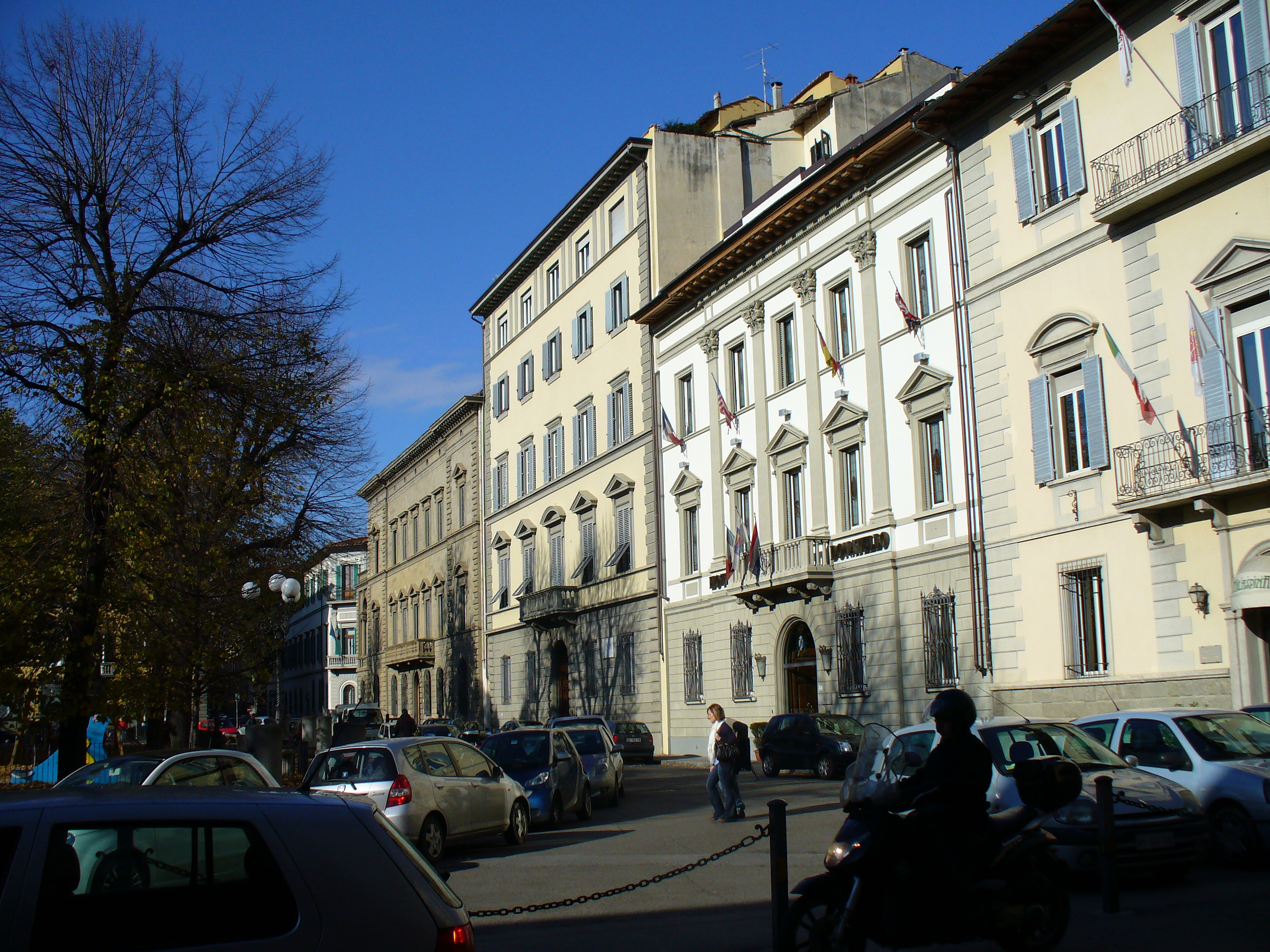
Piazza dell'Indipendenza

This is a list of the principal squares of Florence in Italy.

== On the northern bank of the River Arno ==
=== In the centre ===
- Piazza del Duomo: Piazza del Duomo is located in the heart of the historic centre of Florence. It is one of the most visited places in Europe and the world; here are the Florence Cathedral with the Cupola del Brunelleschi, the Giotto's Campanile, the Florence Baptistry, the Loggia del Bigallo, the Museo dell'Opera del Duomo, and the Arcivescovile and Canonici's palace. The west zone of this square is called Piazza San Giovanni.
- Piazza della Repubblica: It is a square in the centre of Florence, location of the cultural cafes and bourgeois palaces. Among the square's cafes, the Giubbe Rosse cafe has long been a meeting place for famous artists and writers, notably those of Futurism.
- Piazza Santa Croce: Dominated by the Basilica of Santa Croce it is a rectangular square in the center of the city. Here the Calcio Fiorentino is played every year and when can find on this square the Palazzo dell'Antella, the Palazzo Cocchi-Serristori (main office of center of Florence quarter) and the Dante's statue.
- Piazza della Signoria: It is the focal point of the origin and of the history of the Florentine Republic and still maintains its reputation as the political hub of the city. The impressive 14th century Palazzo Vecchio is still preeminent with its crenellated tower. The square also has the Loggia della Signoria, the Uffizi Gallery, the Palace of the Tribunale della Mercanzia (now the Bureau of Agriculture), and the Uguccioni Palace (16th century, with a facade by Raphael). Located in front of the Palazzo Vecchio is the Palace of the Assicurazioni Generali.
- Piazza San Lorenzo: It has the great Basilica of San Lorenzo with the Cappelle Medicee, a lively open market and the Laurentian Library.
- Piazza Santa Maria Novella: With the Basilica of Santa Maria Novella and the Alinari photography museum, is one of the principal squares of Florence. It is opposite the piazza della Stazione, accessible by Via degli Avelli.
- Piazza della Santissima Annunziata: Located near piazza San Marco and piazza del Duomo is a harmonious square which overlook the Ospedale degli Innocenti, the Loggia dei Servi di Maria, the Budini Gattai palace and the National Archaeological Museum
- Piazza della Stazione: It is a big square in the centre of the city, one of the main focal point of transport in Florence. Here converge almost the entire bus-line, and tramways, and the central station of Florence the biggest and masterpiece of Rationalism Firenze Santa Maria Novella railway station, that is used by 59,000,000 people every year. On piazza della Stazione we can also find the Palazzina Reale di Santa Maria Novella (where the king of Italy stayed), and the Palazzo degli Affari.
- Piazza dell'Indipendenza: It is a wide square located near piazza della Stazione and San Lorenzo market, with palaces typically bourgeois where lived Guido Nobili and Theodosia Trollope, Thomas Trollope and Fanny Trollope.
- Piazza San Marco: Located in the north zone of the historic centre of Florence near the Piazza della Santissima Annunziata, it hosts the Basilica of San Marco, the headquarters of the University of Florence and the renowned Academy of Fine Arts of Florence.
- Piazza Santa Trinita: It is near the Arno that mark the end of the elegant fashion-street of Via de' Tornabuoni. On the Piazza Santa Trinita overlooking the Basilica of Santa Trinita (that gives the name to the square), the Palazzo Spini Feroni, the Palazzo Buondelmonti, the Palazzo Bartolini Salimbeni and the Column of Justice.
- Piazza dei Ciompi: It has the Loggia del Pesce, designed by Giorgio Vasari and the house of Lorenzo Ghiberti.
- Piazza d'Azeglio: Near the Viali di Circonvallazione it has the Villino Uzielli Palace.
- Piazza Goldoni: In front of Ponte alla Carraia, in the piazza Goldoni are the Palazzo Ricasoli and the Monument to Carlo Goldoni.
- Piazza del Limbo
- Piazza dei Giudici
- Piazza Mentana
- Piazza del Mercato Centrale
- Piazza Ognissanti
- Piazza delle Pallottole
- Piazza San Benedetto
- Piazza San Firenze
- Piazza San Pier Maggiore
- Piazza Strozzi
- Piazza dell'Unità Italiana
- Piazza del Capitolo
- Piazza Adua

=== In the Viali di Circonvallazione ===
- Piazza Beccaria: Piazza Beccaria is a square on the viali di Circonvallazione and on this square overlook the State Archives, La Nazione's headquarters and the Porta alla Croce.
- Piazza della Libertà: It is the northernmost point of the historic centre of Florence. It was created in the 19th century during works to produce the Viali di Circonvallazione around the city. In this square is located the beautiful triumphal arch of Florence.
- Piazzale Donatello
- Piazza Bambine e Bambini di Beslan

=== Others ===
- Piazza Oberdan
- Piazza Puccini
- Piazza San Jacopino
- Piazza Savonarola
- Piazza della Vittoria
- Piazza Vittorio Veneto
- Piazza Piave
- Piazza Dalmazia
- Piazza Leopoldo Pietro

== Oltrarno ==
- Piazza del Carmine
- Piazza di Cestello
- Piazza Demidoff
- Piazza San Felice in Piazza
- Piazzale Michelangelo: It is a famous square with a magnificent panoramic view of Florence, Italy and is a popular tourist destination in the Oltrarno district of the city. The view from this most famous observation point of the city landscape has been reproduced in countless postcards and snapshots over the years.
- Piazza de' Mozzi
- Piazza Piattellina
- Piazza de' Pitti
- Piazza Giuseppe Poggi
- Piazza Santo Spirito
- Piazza Tasso
- Piazza del Tiratoio
- Piazza della Passera
- Piazza Santa Maria Soprarno
- Piazza de' Nerli

== See also ==
- Florence
- Historic centre of Florence
- Tuscany
