= Historic Centre of Florence =

Part of the Italian city of Florence

UNESCO World Heritage Site
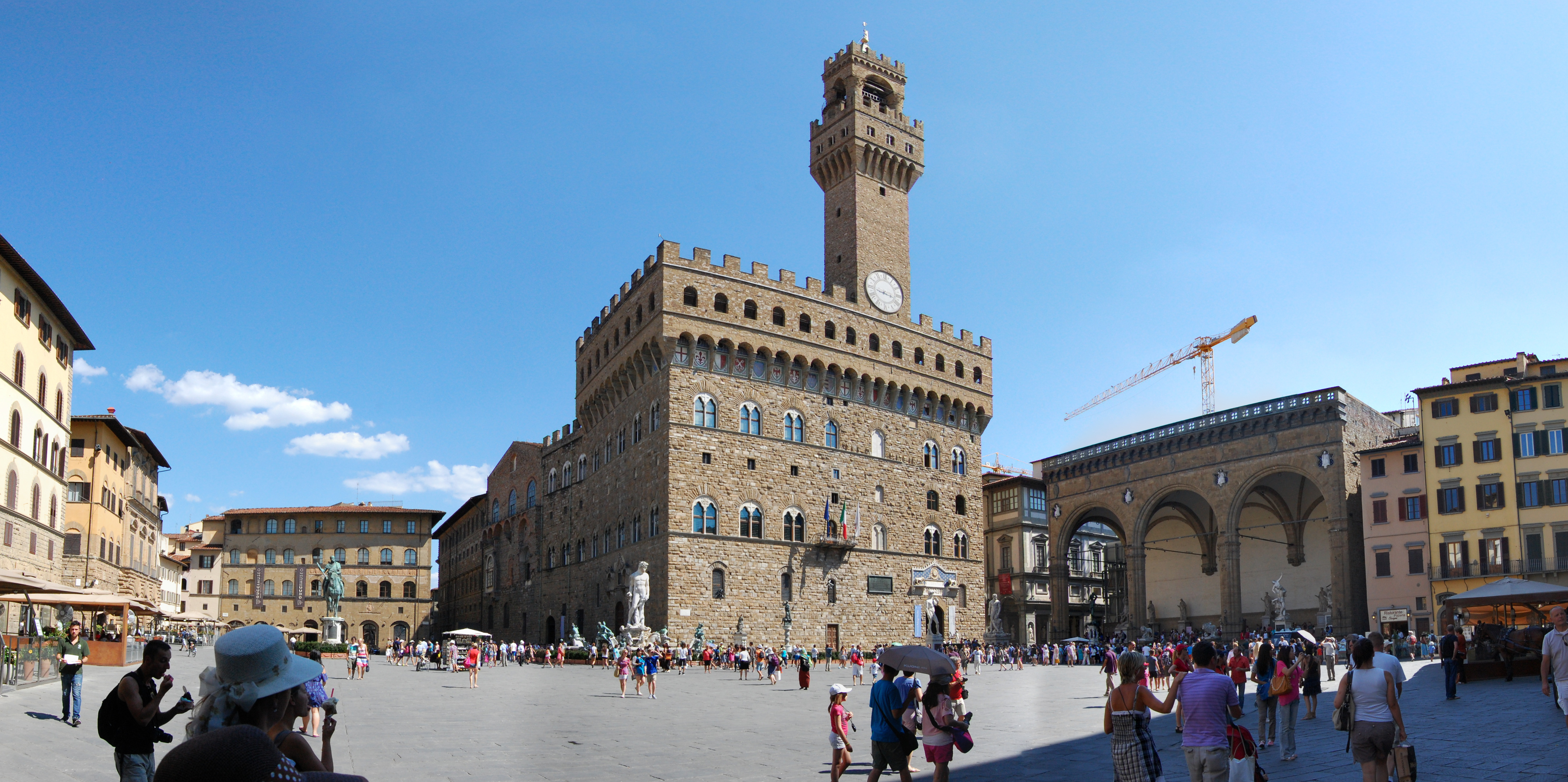
- Piazza della Signoria

- Location within Tuscany Location within Italy
- Location: Florence, Tuscany, Italy
- Criteria: Cultural: (i)(ii)(iii)(iv)(vi)
- Reference: 174bis
- Inscription: 1982 (6th Session)
- Extensions: 2015
- Area: 505 ha (1,250 acres)
- Buffer zone: 10,480 ha (25,900 acres)
- Coordinates: 43°46′23″N 11°15′22″E

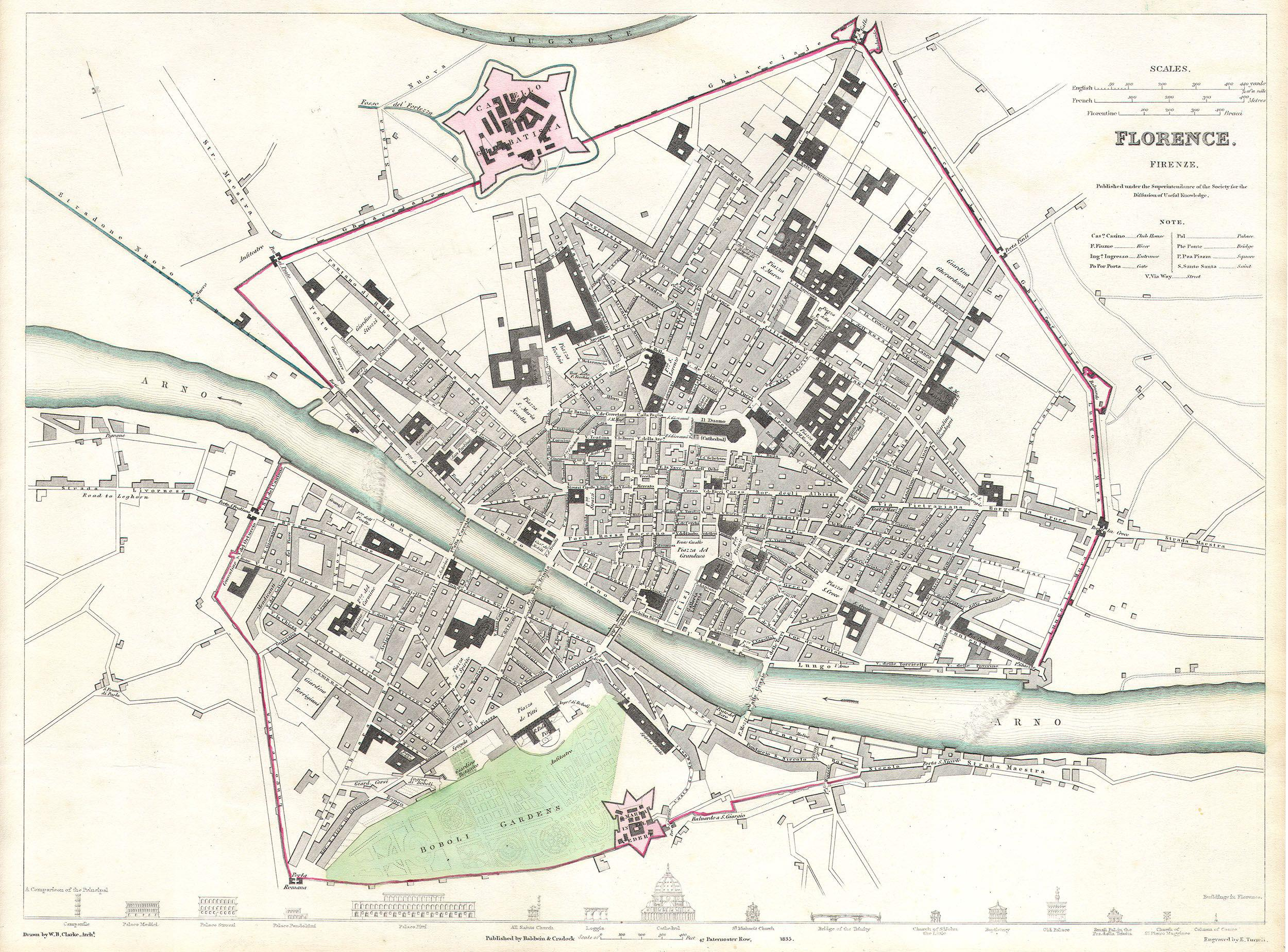
1835 City Map of Florence, still largely in the confines of its medieval city center

The historic centre of Florence is part of quartiere 1 of the Italian city of Florence. This quarter was named a World Heritage Site by UNESCO in 1982.

Built on the site of an Etruscan settlement, Florence, the symbol of the Renaissance, rose to economic and cultural pre-eminence under the Medici in the 15th and 16th centuries. Its 600 years of extraordinary artistic activity can be seen above all in the 13th-century cathedral (Santa Maria del Fiore), the Church of Santa Croce, the Uffizi and the Pitti Palace, the work of great masters such as Giotto, Filippo Brunelleschi, Sandro Botticelli and Michelangelo.

== Aspect ==
Closed inside the avenues traced on the old medieval walls, the historic centre of Florence contains the city's most important cultural heritage sites. Delimited by the 14th-century wall circuit, built thanks to the economic and commercial power reached at the time, Florence knew its maximum splendour in the following two centuries.

The spiritual centre of the city is the Piazza del Duomo with the Cathedral of Santa Maria del Fiore, flanked by Giotto's Campanile and facing the Baptistry of Saint John with the 'Gates of Paradise' by Lorenzo Ghiberti. From here to the north there are the Palazzo Medici Riccardi by Michelozzo, the Basilica of Saint Lawrence by Filippo Brunelleschi, with the precious sacristies of Donatello and Michelangelo. Further on is the Museum of San Marco with masterpieces by Fra Angelico, the Accademia Gallery which houses among other works the David by Michelangelo (1501–1504), and the Piazza della Santissima Annunziata with the Loggia of the Innocenti by Filippo Brunelleschi.

Heading south from the Duomo there is the political and cultural centre of Florence with the Palazzo Vecchio and the Uffizi Gallery nearby, near which are the Bargello Museum and the Basilica of the Holy Cross. Crossing the Ponte Vecchio we arrive at the Oltrarno district with the Pitti Palace and the Boboli Gardens. Still in Oltrarno, there are the Basilica of the Holy Spirit by Filippo Brunelleschi and the Church of Santa Maria del Carmine, with frescoes by Masolino, Masaccio and Filippino Lippi.

In the area west of the Duomo is situated the imposing palace Palazzo Strozzi (home of major exhibitions and cultural institutions) and the Basilica of Santa Maria Novella, with the façade designed by Leon Battista Alberti.

The old town can be appreciated in its entirety from the surrounding hills, especially from Forte Belvedere, from the Piazzale Michelangelo with the Romanesque Basilica of San Miniato al Monte and the hills of Fiesole, which offers one of the most beautiful views of the Arno valley.

The northern part of the old town is surrounded by the avenues of Viali di Circonvallazione, a series of large six-lane avenues inspired by the Parisian boulevards created when Florence was the capital of Italy, between 1865 and 1871.

The centre of Florence, with its hundreds of business activities, is a paradise for shopping and entertainment: it offers elegant boutiques, historic cafés, and lively street markets, as well as hosting numerous nightclubs, discos, American bars and meeting places for a drink (the famous Negroni cocktail was born here).

== See also ==
- Squares of the historic centre of Florence

== Sources ==
- "City of Florence". City of Florence. Archived from the original on 14 September 2017.
