= Piazza della Repubblica, Florence =

Square in Florence, Italy

Coordinates: 43°46′17″N 11°15′14″E

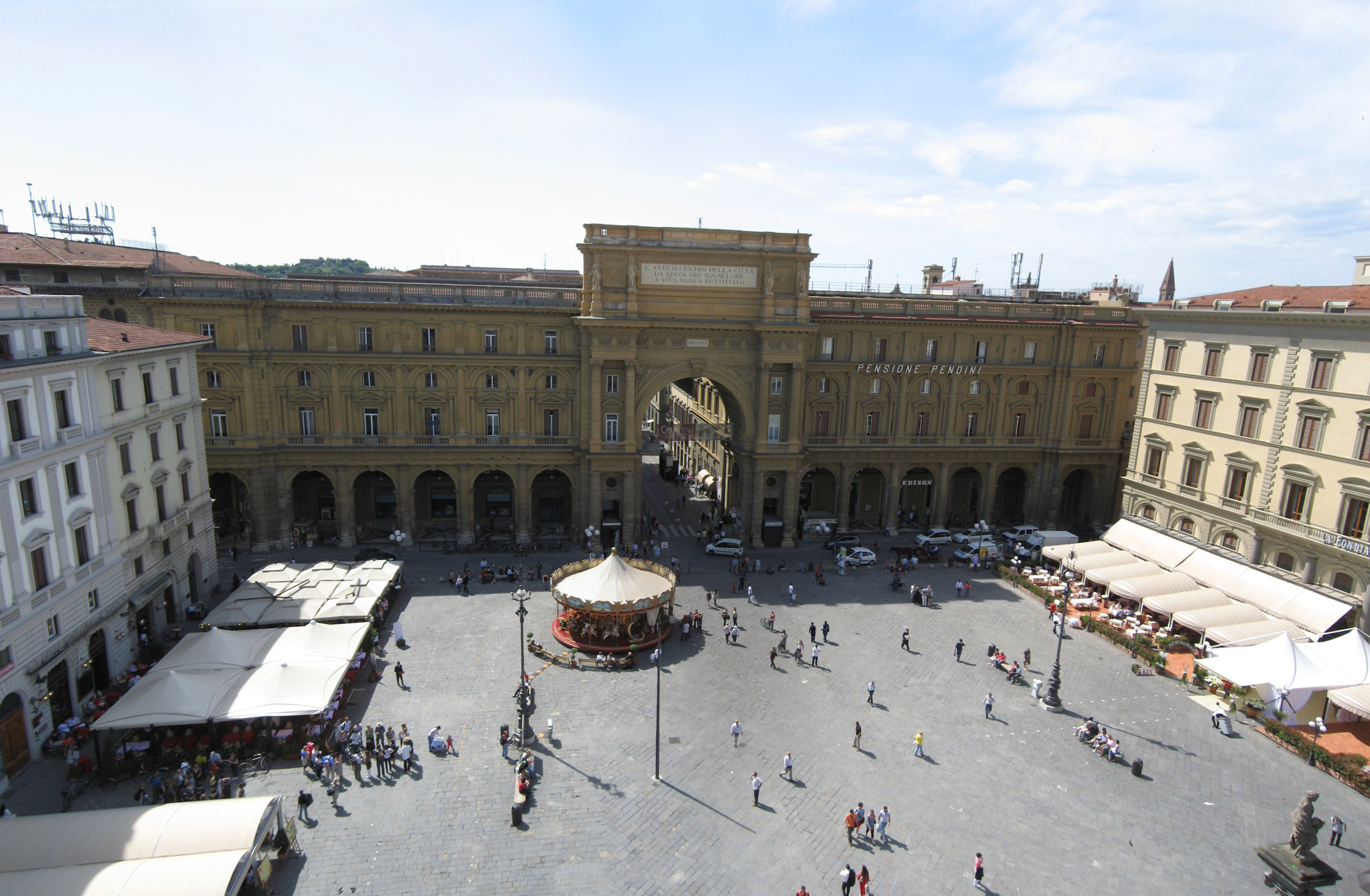
Piazza della Repubblica in Florence

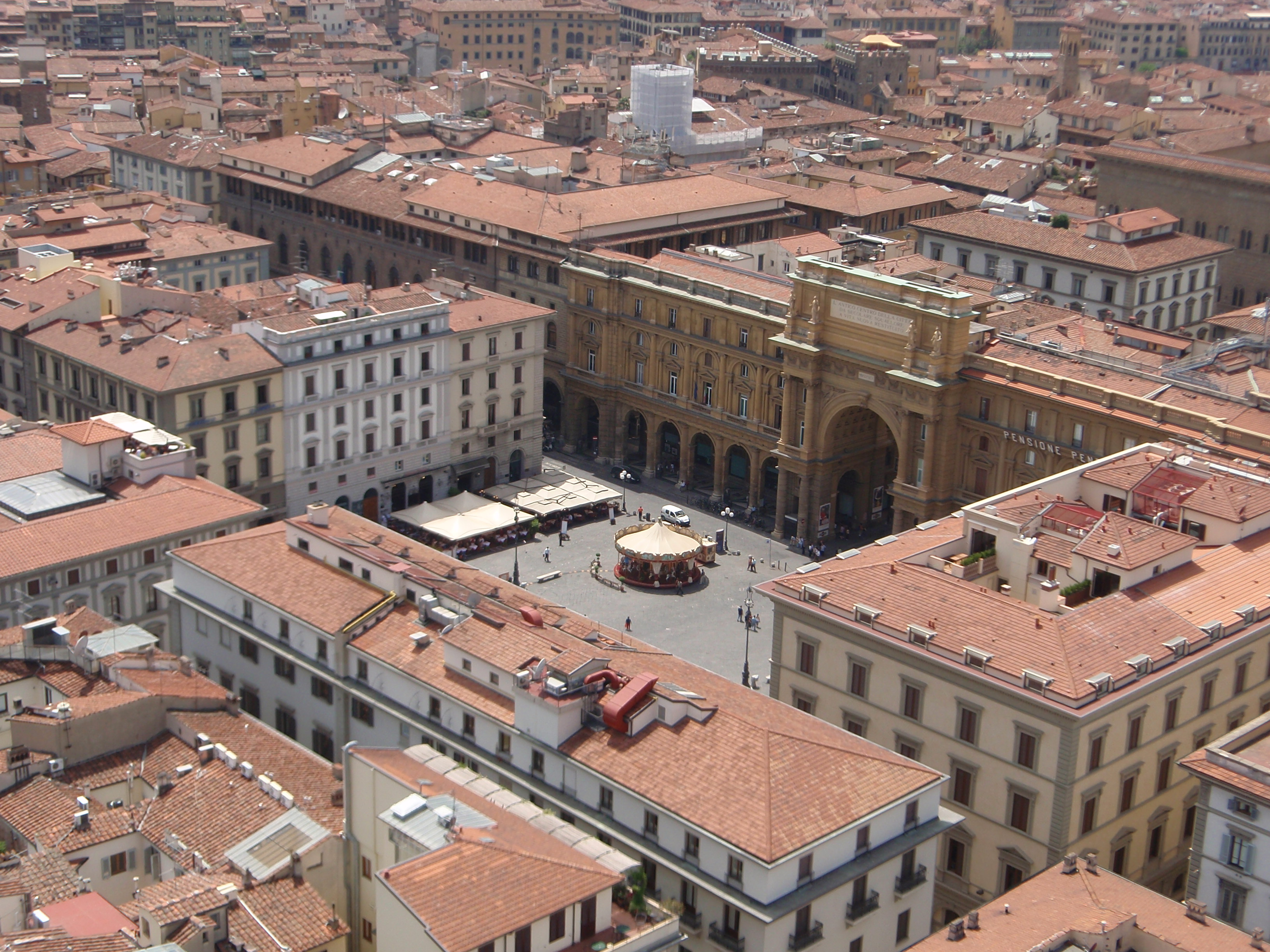
The piazza as seen from Giotto's Campanile

Piazza della Repubblica (Italian pronunciation: [ˈpjattsa della reˈpubblika], Republic Square) is a city square in Florence, Italy. It was originally the site of the city's forum; then of its old Jewish ghetto, which was swept away during the improvement works, or Risanamento, initiated during the brief period when Florence was the capital of a reunited Italy—work that also created the city's avenues and boulevards. At that time, the Loggia del Pesce from the Mercato Vecchio was also moved to Piazza Ciompi. The square's Giubbe Rosse cafe has long been a meeting place for famous artists and writers, notably those of Futurism.

== History ==
=== Roman forum ===
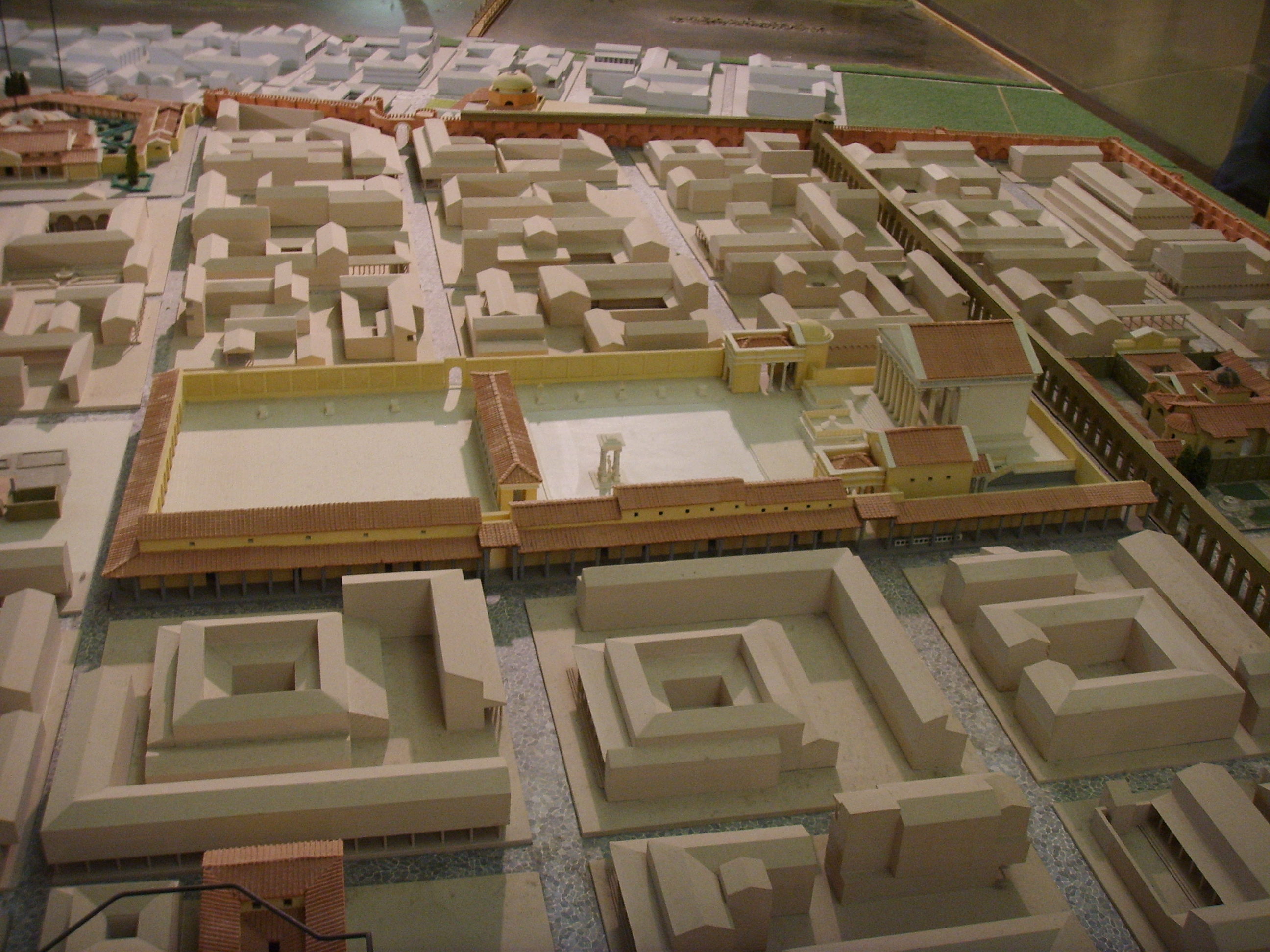
A speculative reconstruction of the Forum and surrounding buildings (Museo di Firenze com'era)

Piazza della Repubblica marks the site of the forum, the centre of the Roman city. The exact present site of the Colonna dell'Abbondanza marks the intersection of the axes of the cardo (now via Roma and via Calimala) and decumanus (now via degli Strozzi, via degli Speziali, and via del Corso). Foundations of a thermae complex on the south side and a religious building were found in the 19th-century demolition of the warren of medieval streets that had encroached upon the site. Via del Campidoglio and Via delle Terme, for example, were named after the archaeological remains beneath them.

The chronicler Giovanni Villani reported an oral tradition that there was a temple to Mars on or near this site, and that Mars was the city's patron god, which determined the city's warlike character. According to Villani, in the Middle Ages a statue of Mars was placed on the predecessor to the Ponte Vecchio, which, along with the bridge, was swept away in the flood of 1333.

=== Piazza del Mercato Vecchio and the Ghetto ===
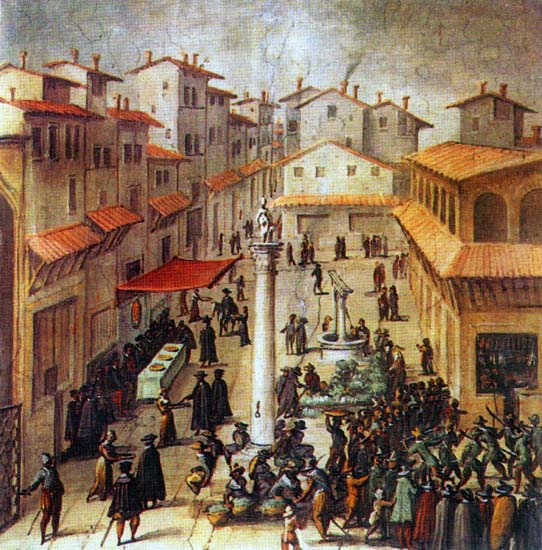
Piazza del Mercato Vecchio, by Giovanni Stradano (Palazzo Vecchio, Sala di Gualdrada)

In the early medieval period the forum area was densely inhabited. Before the closure of the fifth circle of city walls, chroniclers record that there was no longer a single garden or pasture in the city, and that urban crowding led to tenements with ever-rising floors, including case-torri (tower houses).

The area retained its function as a meeting place and market, which was institutionalised after 1000. As in other Italian towns, Florence came to define public space intended for commerce, with its complementary spaces nearby, the piazza del Duomo for religious affairs and a piazza del Comune, now Piazza della Signoria, for political and civil affairs. The construction of the Loggia del Mercato Nuovo near Ponte Vecchio in the 16th century led to the renaming of the market here to the Mercato Vecchio. The actual marketplace here was a long, low building in an oval rectilinear plan, with an overhanging roof to shelter the customers and the stalls placed on either side. Other shops and stalls were sited in the piazzetta.

The area was a maze tightly packed streets and buildings in addition to the marketplace. The Mercato Vecchio had numerous shrines and churches razed in the mid-18th century. On the piazzetta del Mercato were the churches of San Tommaso, and Santa Maria in Campidoglio. There was also the shrine of Santa Maria della Tromba, rebuilt in the north angle of Palazzo dell'Arte della Lana behind the Orsanmichele. The Jewish Ghetto imposed by Cosimo I collected the city's Jews into a portion of this space. The ghetto contained both an Italian and a Spanish or Levantine synagogue.

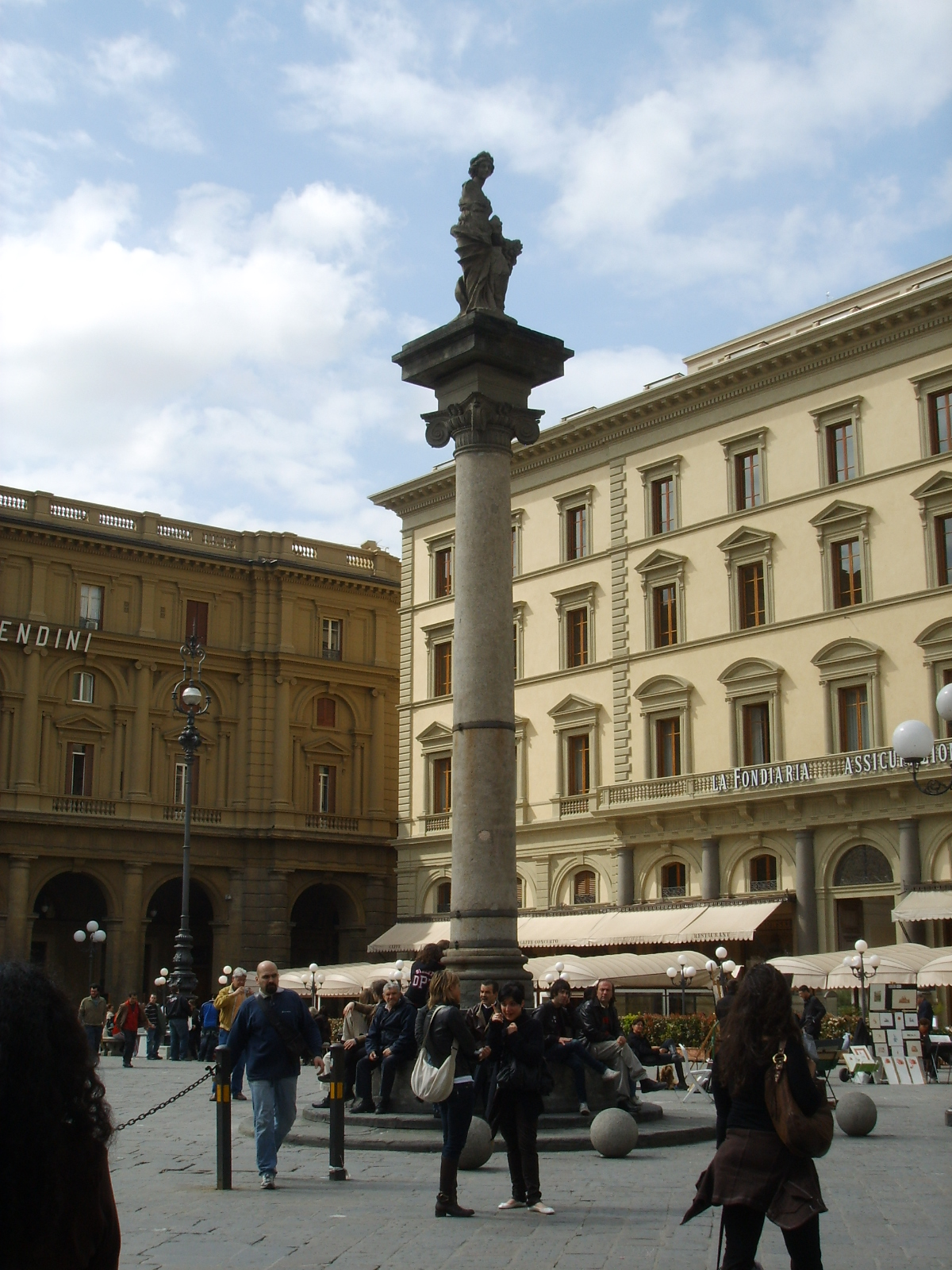
The Column of Abundance

The sole surviving witness to the old piazza del Mercato is the Colonna della Dovizia or Colonna dell'Abbondanza (Column of Abundance, re-positioned in 1956) on a stepped base. Once considered to be the centre of the city, this column was erected at the crossing of the cardo and decumanus of the ancient Roman city. The present column dates to 1431, and is surmounted by a grey sandstone statue of Dovizia (or Abbondanza), by Giovan Battista Foggini, replacing an original by Donatello (found to be irreparably eroded in 1721. Today Foggini's original statue is in Palazzo della Cassa di Risparmio in via dell'Oriuolo, whilst on the column is a 1956 replica.

=== The piazza "risanata" ===
The present appearance of the square is the result of the city planning announced and carried out on the proclamation of Florence as the capital of Italy (1865–71), with particularly intense activity in this Piazza between 1885 and 1895. In this period, known as the Risanamento in the commemorative nineteenth-century terminology (or, by its detractors, the sventramento or ruining), large parts of the city centre were demolished.

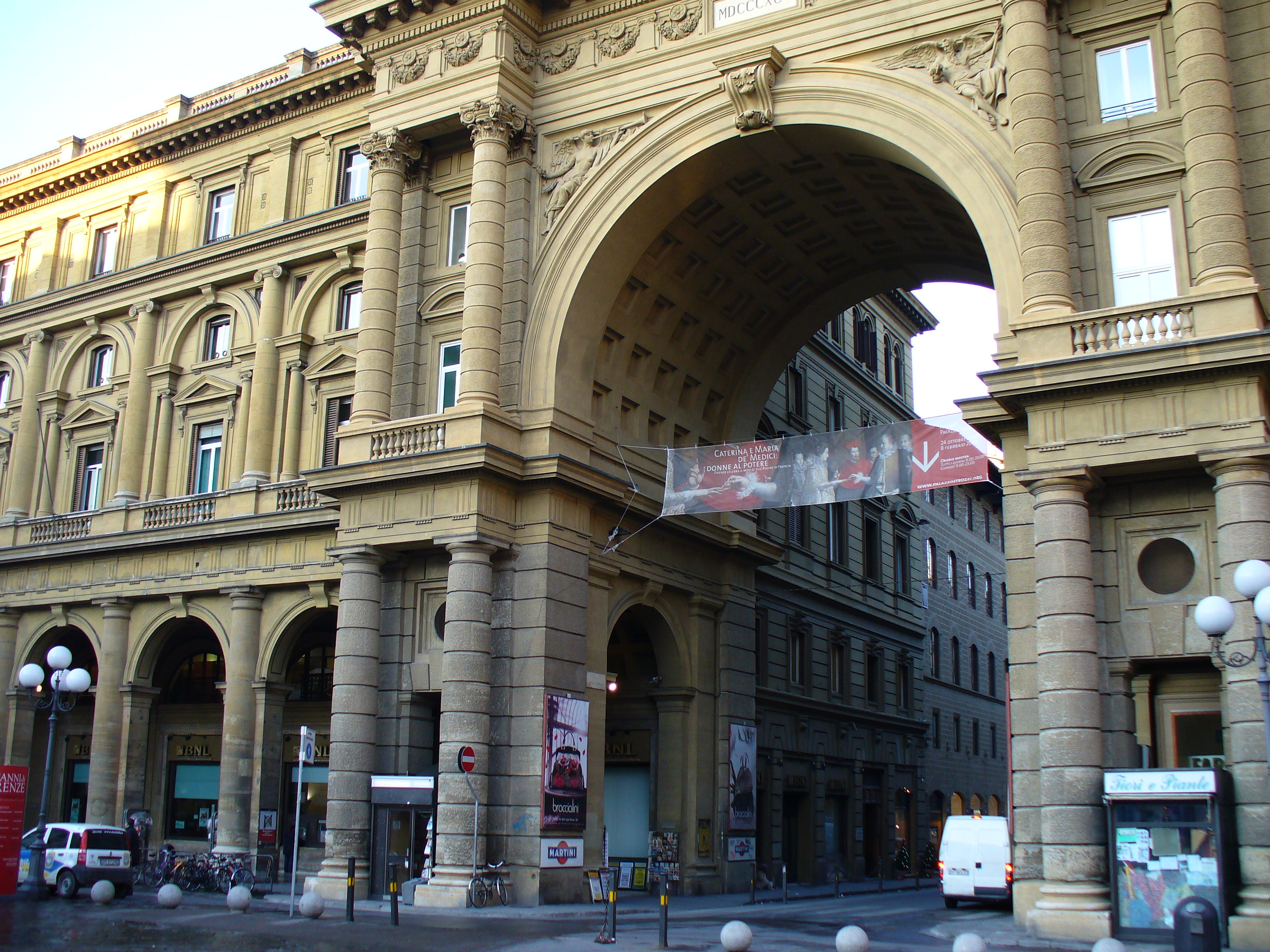
The arch Palazzo dell'Arcone di Piazza

The decision to broaden the square allowed the total destruction of buildings of great importance: medieval towers, churches, the corporate seats of the Arti, some palaces of noble families, as well as craftsmen's shops and residences. The demolition was presented as a necessity if the area's insanitary conditions were to be improved, but was in reality led above all to building speculation and to legitimization of the will of the emerging middle-class emergente, protagonist in the events immediately prior to unification.

The town in fact underwent an enormous loss, minimally compensated for by the rescue of monuments like Vasari's Loggia del Pesce that was dismantled and reassembled in Piazza dei Ciompi. The appearance of the square before the nineteenth-century demolitions is documented in prints, paintings and drawings in the Museo di Firenze com'era in Via dell'Oriuolo. A plentiful supply of works of art and architectural fragments fed the antiquarian market, and only some of them could be saved for the Museo nazionale di San Marco, whilst others were returned to the town as donations such as those that allowed the founding of the Museo Bardini and Museo Horne. Artists like Telemaco Signorini depicted with melancholy this disappearing part of town.

In 1888, after the demolition of the hovels in the center of the Mercato, the old piazza del Mercato Vecchio reappeared, with the Loggia, the Colonna dell'Abbondanza and the church of San Tommaso, but the shrewd restorers preferred to proceed with a more radical demolition yet.

On 20 September 1890, with the building-sites still open to rebuild the palazzoni in the square, the Equestrian Monument to Vittorio Emanuele II was inaugurated. This monument gave the piazza its original name. An old photograph taken on the day of the inauguration show the buildings of the square still incomplete and covered for the civil ceremony in scenery representing good luck. The statue, a commemorative and rather rhetorical work which did not please the Florentines, was mocked in a biting sonnet by Vamba, entitled Emanuele a corpo sciolto. Today the sculpture is in a Piazzale of the Parco delle Cascine.

The palaces that rose in the new square, painted bitterly by the young Telemaco Signorini, followed the eclectic fashion of the time and had been planned by already well-known architects: Vincenzo Micheli, Luigi Buonamici, Giuseppe Boccini. Following this transformation, the square became a kind of "lounge" for the town; since then refined palaces, luxury hotels, department stores and elegant cafes have sprung up around it, among which the known Caffè delle Giubbe Rosse, where famous scholars and artists met and clashed.

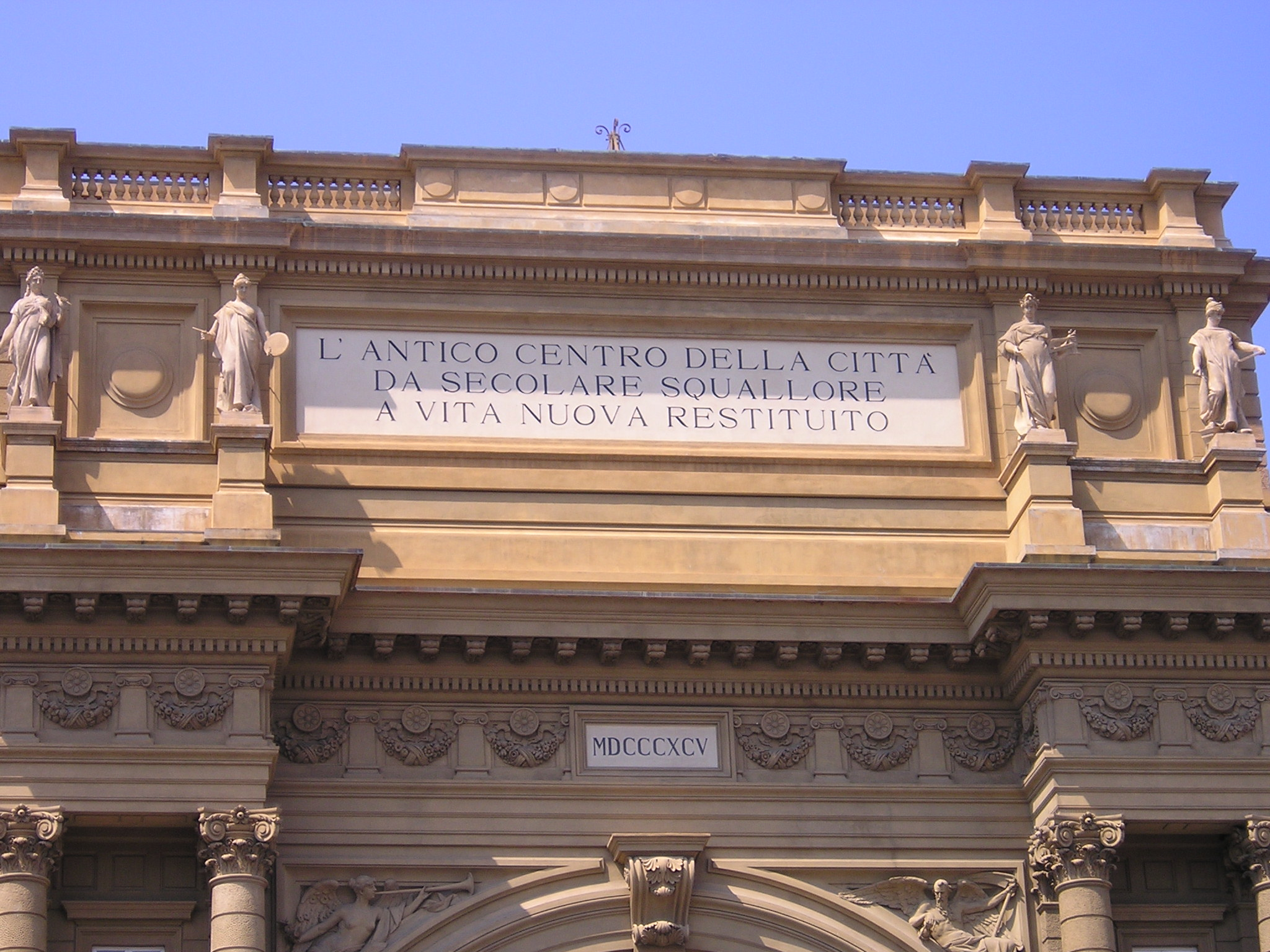
The inscription on the arch

The porticos with the triumphal arch, called the "Arcone", was designed by Micheli and was inspired by the most courtly Florentine Renaissance architecture, even if its additions to that style seem to be distant from the true ancient style. The pompous inscription that dominates the square was dictated, it seems, from Isidoro del Lungo, or another literary source:

L'ANTICO CENTRO DELLA CITTÀ

DA SECOLARE SQUALLORE
A VITA NUOVA RESTITUITO

(The ancient centre of the city / restored from age-old squalor / to new life)

On top of the Arcone is an allegorical group of three women in plaster, representing Italy, Art and Science. The Florentines instead nicknamed them after three famous prostitutes of the era, la Starnotti, la Cipischioni e la Trattienghi. Having deteriorated, the group was removed in 1904.

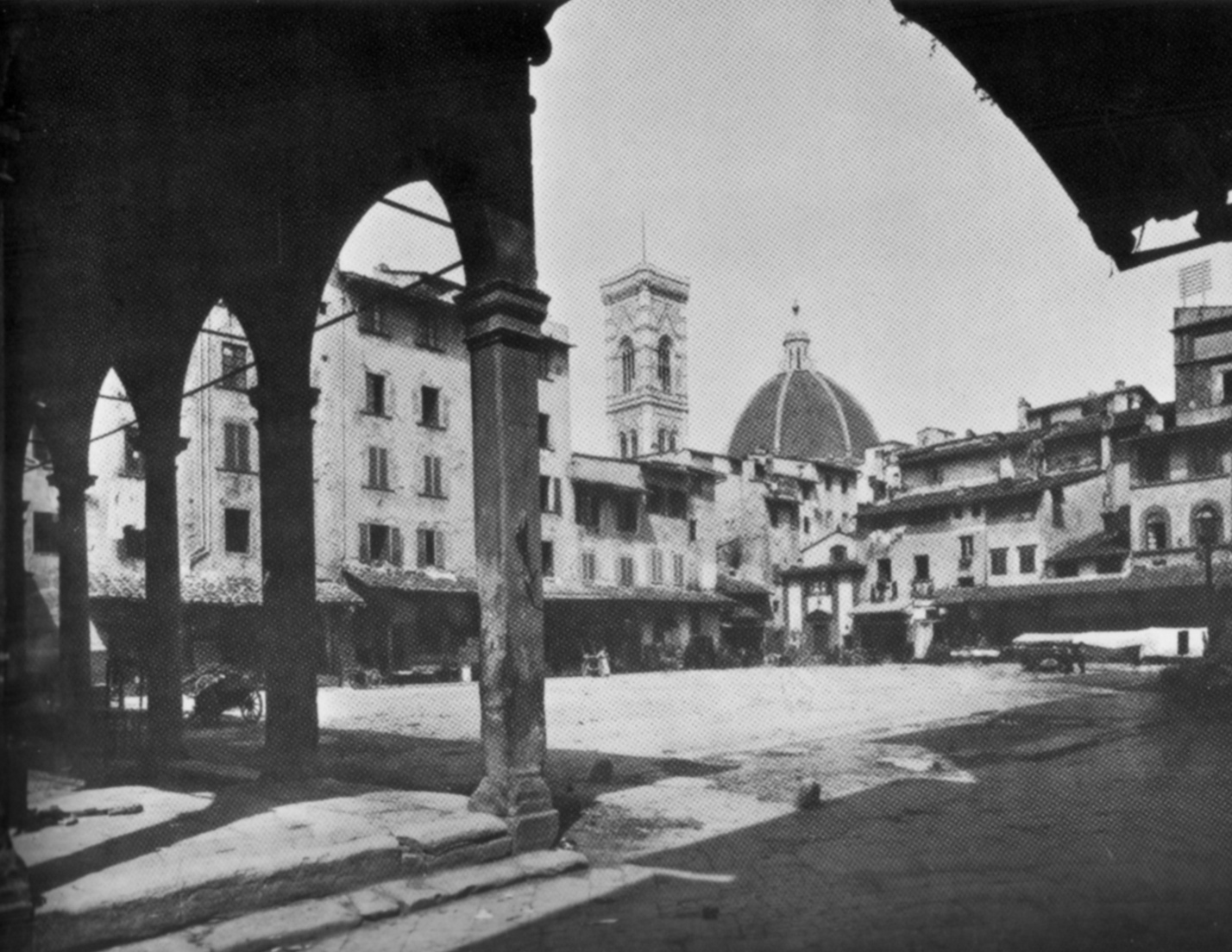
Piazza del Mercato Vecchio, c. 1888

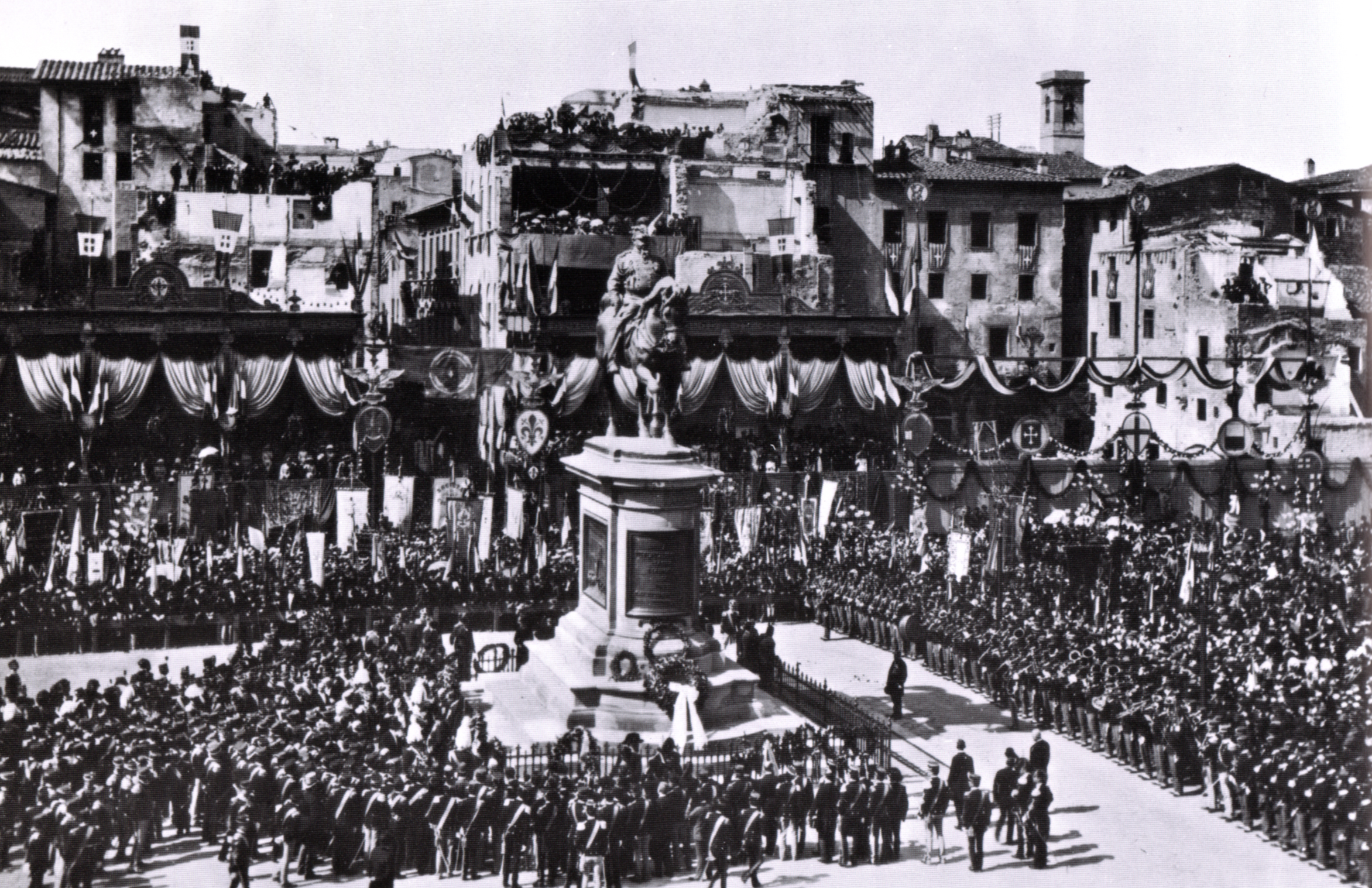
The inauguration of the monument to Vittorio Emanuele II, 20 September 1890

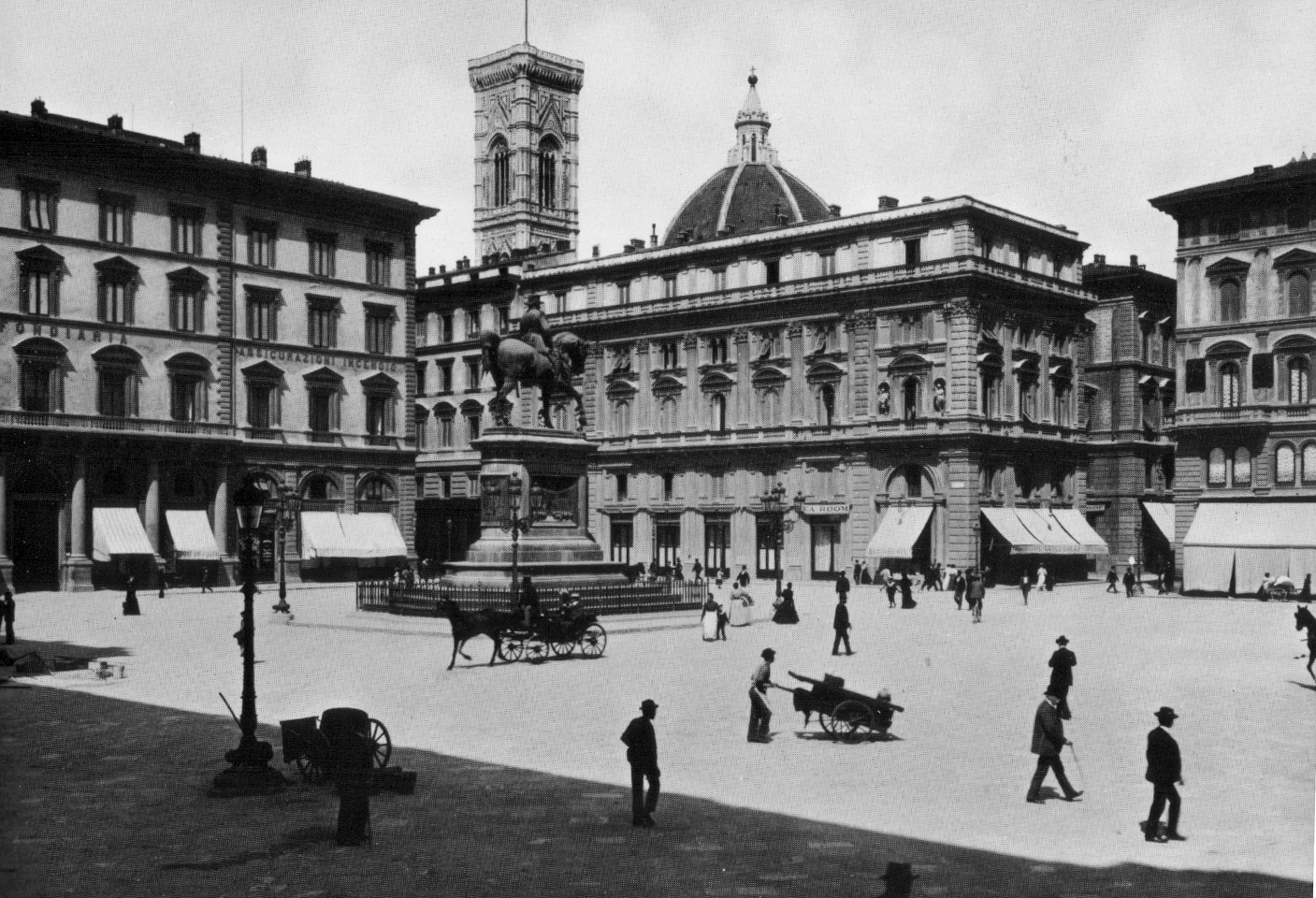
Piazza Vittorio Emanuele II, circa 1896

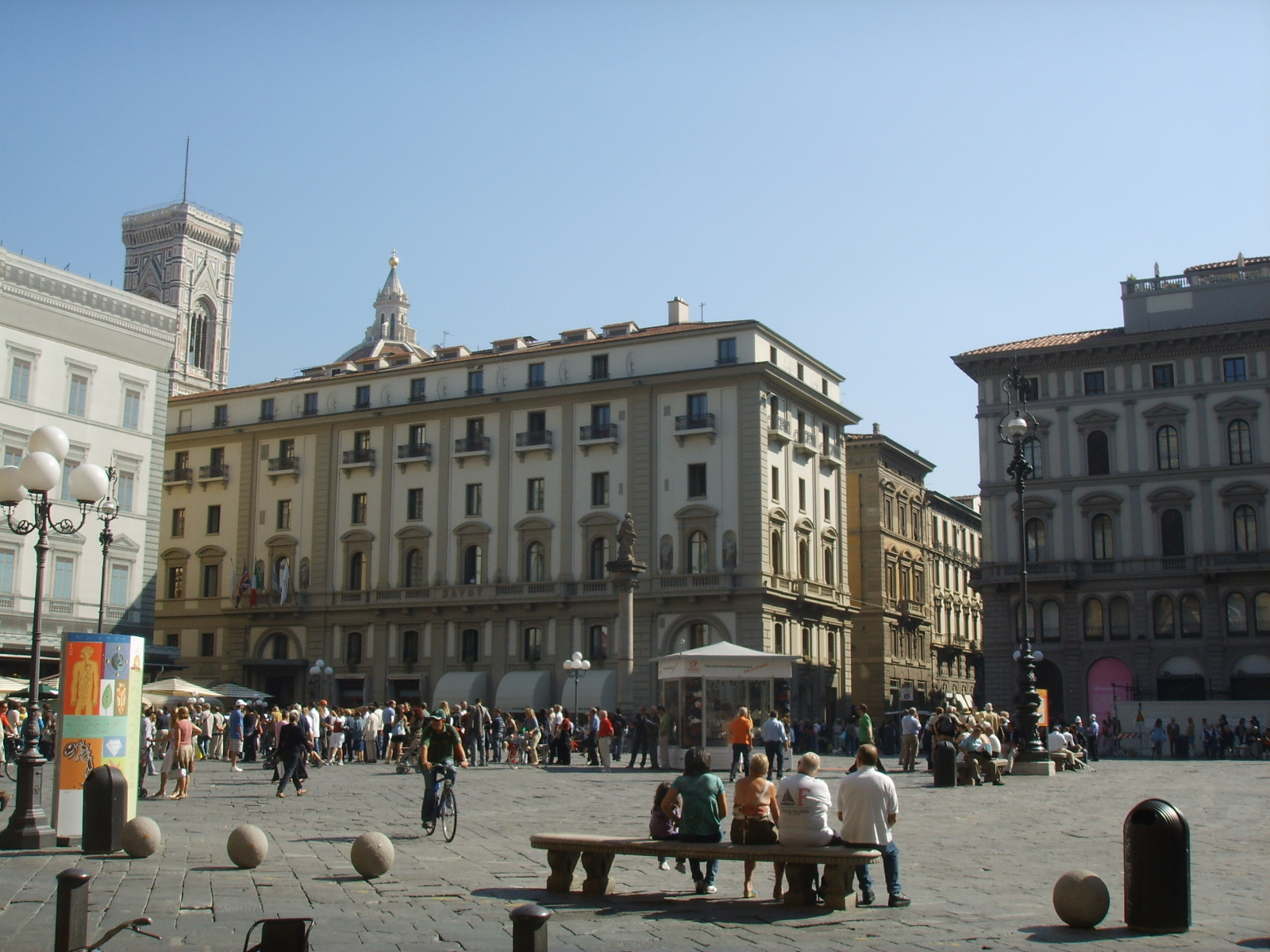
Piazza della Repubblica, 2007

=== The piazza today ===
The statue of Vittorio Emanuele II was removed in 1932 and moved to the Cascine. In the postwar period the name of the piazza was changed from Piazza Vittorio Emanuele II to piazza della Repubblica. In 1956 the Colonna dell'Abbondanza was re-sited. The piazza is today a theatre of street-artists and impromptu exhibitions.

==== The Cafès ====
Today piazza della Repubblica houses three caffès: Caffè Gilli, Paszkowski and Caffè Giubbe Rosse.

== Description ==
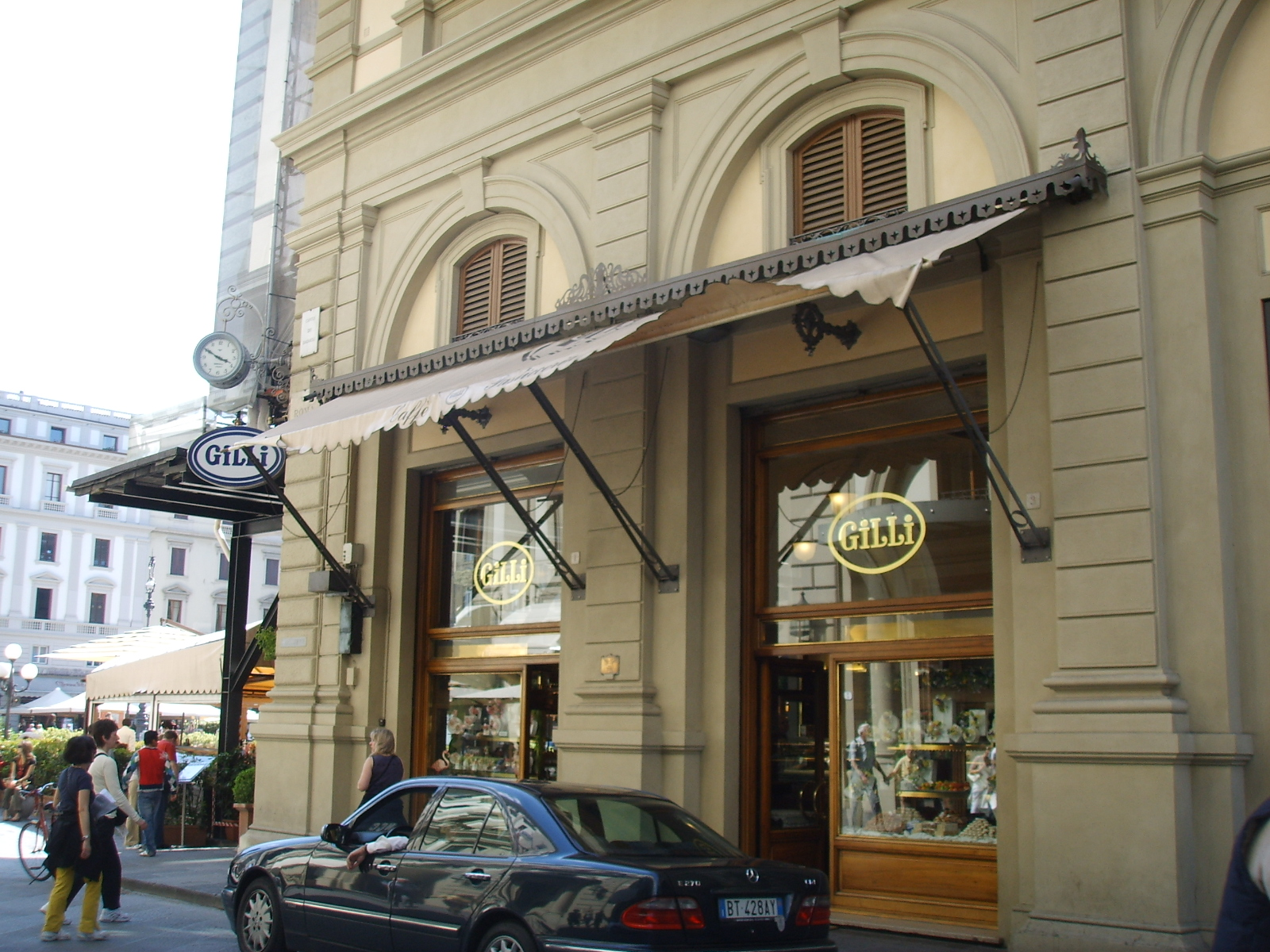
Caffè Gilli

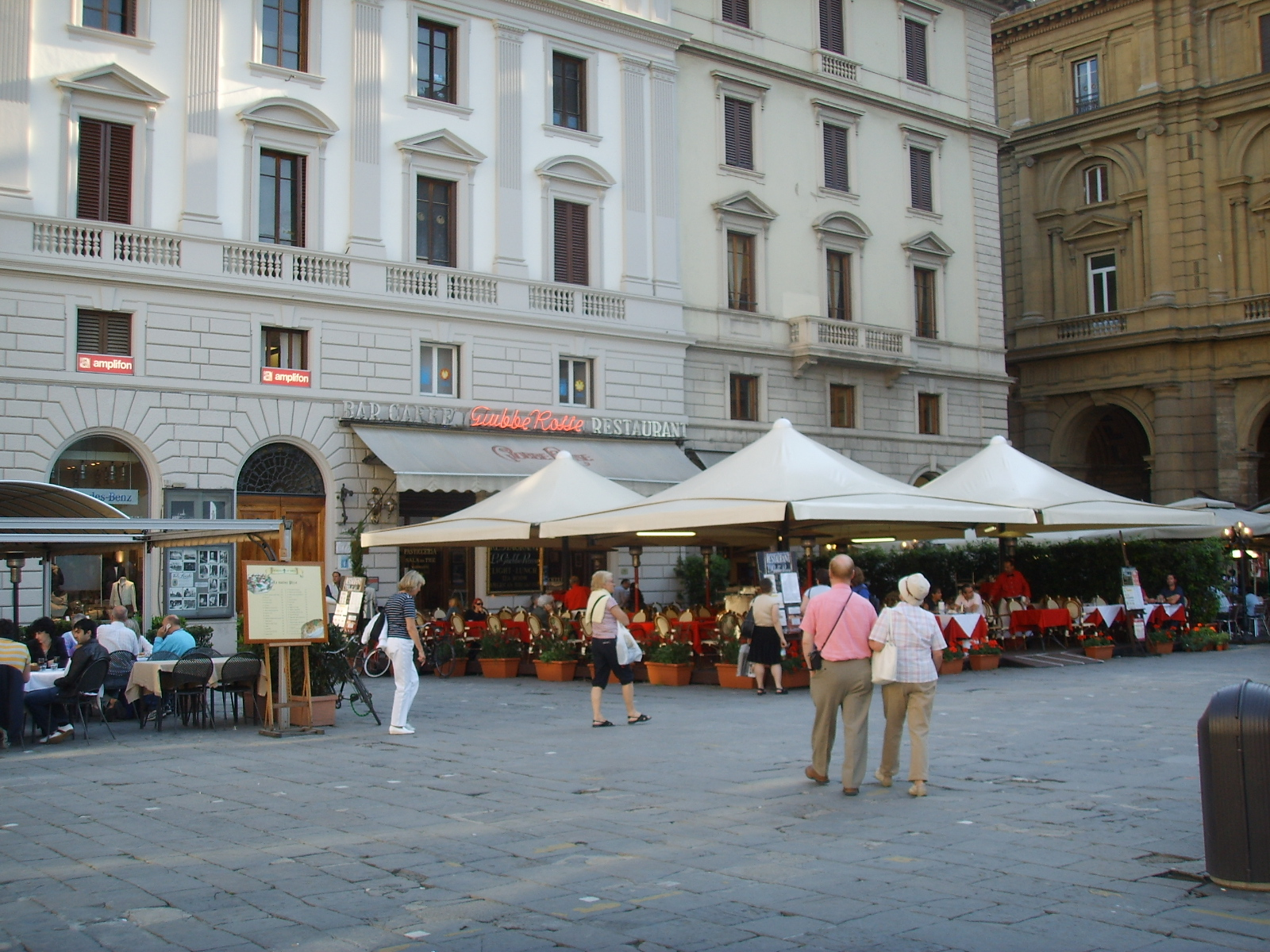
Caffé Le Giubbe Rosse

=== North side ===
The north side is about 75 metres long and is made up of a single large building. On its ground floor are Caffè Gilli (to the right) and of the Caffè Paszkowski (on the left). Its east end is the connection between the piazza and via Roma, and at its west end is the piazza's connection with via Brunelleschi.

=== South side ===
The south side is made up of a single long building, containing the historical Caffè delle Giubbe Rosse. Entirely covered with photographs, drawings and memories of its famous patrons, the Caffè was the location for the brawl between the Milanese Futurists of Marinetti and the Florentine artists centred on the magazine La Voce di Ardengo Soffici.

At its two ends, it meets via Calimala (to the east) and via Pellicceria (to the west).

=== East side ===
The east side is made up of two buildings, between which via degli Speziali runs into the piazza.

The building on the left is the Savoy Hotel, built by Vincenzo Micheli. It has been a hotel ever since its inception and its facade is marked by an eclectic style based on the renewal of classical motifs in Florentine architecture. The Palazzo was the model for other palaces on the square which were constructed a few decades afterwards.

Along this side runs a road roadway that to the north is a continuation of via Roma and to the south runs into via Calimala.

=== West side ===
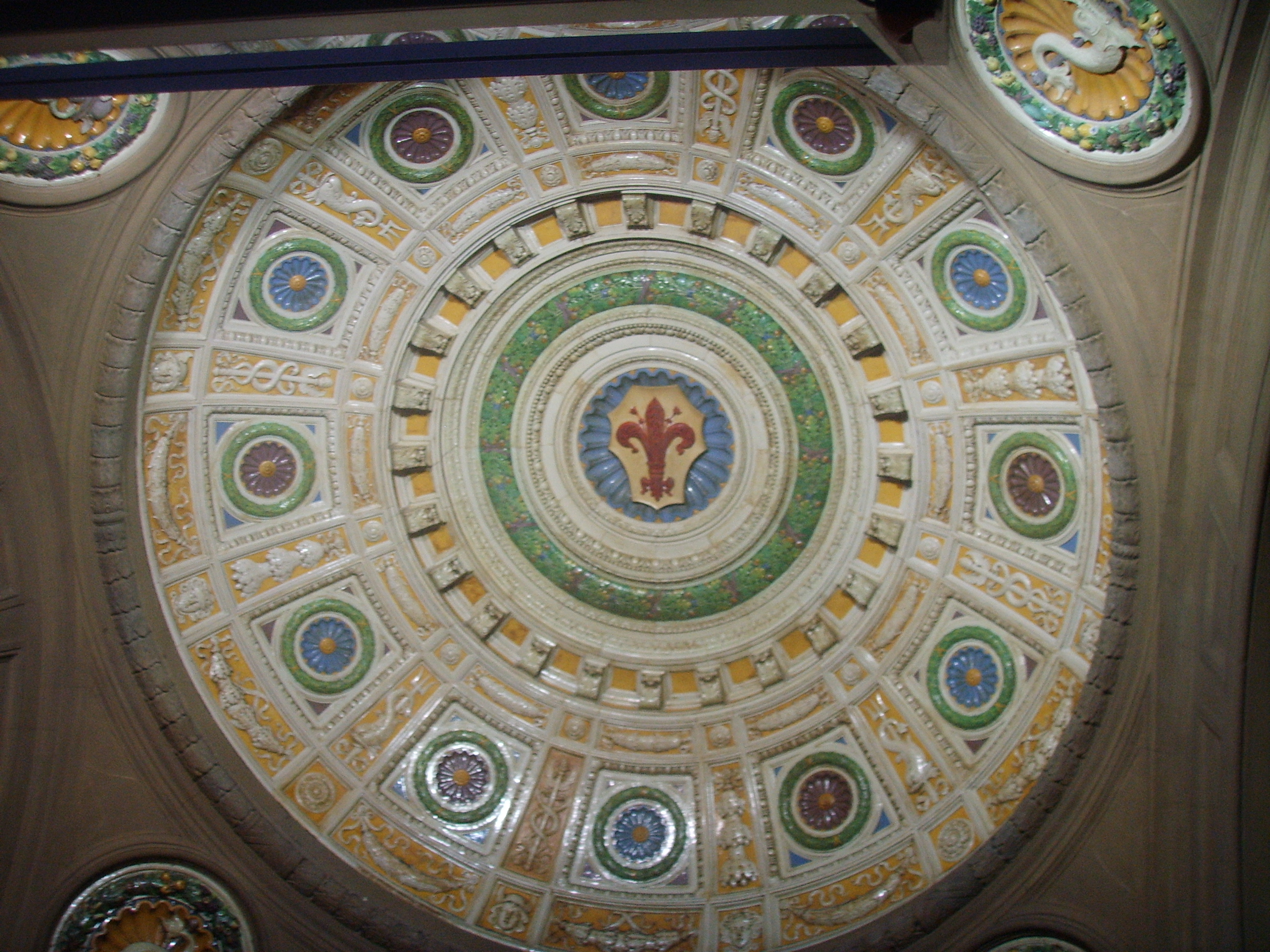
The cupoletta (decorated with maiolica) in the Palazzo delle Poste Centrali

The west side is delimited by the porticos that run north along via Brunelleschi and south along via Pellicceria.

These two lengths of portico are united by a large triumphal arch of I triumph (Arcone) facing via degli Speziali, under which is via degli Strozzi's entrance onto the piazza.

The arcone and the portico Gambrinus, where Cafe Gambrinus (an important meeting place in nineteenth and twentieth century Florence) and Cinema Gambrinus used to be located, were planned and realized by Vincenzo Micheli; the building is designed as a monument sealing the nineteenth-century broadening of the square, as is celebrated by an inscription (quoting Isidoro del Lungo) above the arch.

At the sides of the central arcone the porticos are looser in design, typical of the building of the period, connecting on one side to Palazzo delle Poste (1917).

== Festivals ==
With the piazza's demolition and reconstruction, the continuity of the area's festivals was broken. For example, the Palio dei barberi ceased in the 19th century, as did the two Easter day processions that led up to the Scoppio del Carro (the Brindellone procession drawn by oxen from near Porta al Prato, and the procession with the fire, solemnly lit in the church of the holy apostles. Its centrality in city life did not diminish, however, particularly in the first years of the twentieth century, when the cafes facing onto the piazza became a meeting-place for artists and men of letters.

== Bibliography ==
- (in Italian) Francesco Cesati, La grande guida delle strade di Firenze, Newton Compton Editori, Roma 2003.
- (in Italian) Piero Bargellini, Com'era Firenze 100 anni fa, Bonechi editore, Firenze 1998.

== Sources ==
- This page is a translation of its foreign language equivalents.
