= Monument to Ubaldino Peruzzi, Florence =

Bronze statue

Monument to Ubaldino Peruzzi
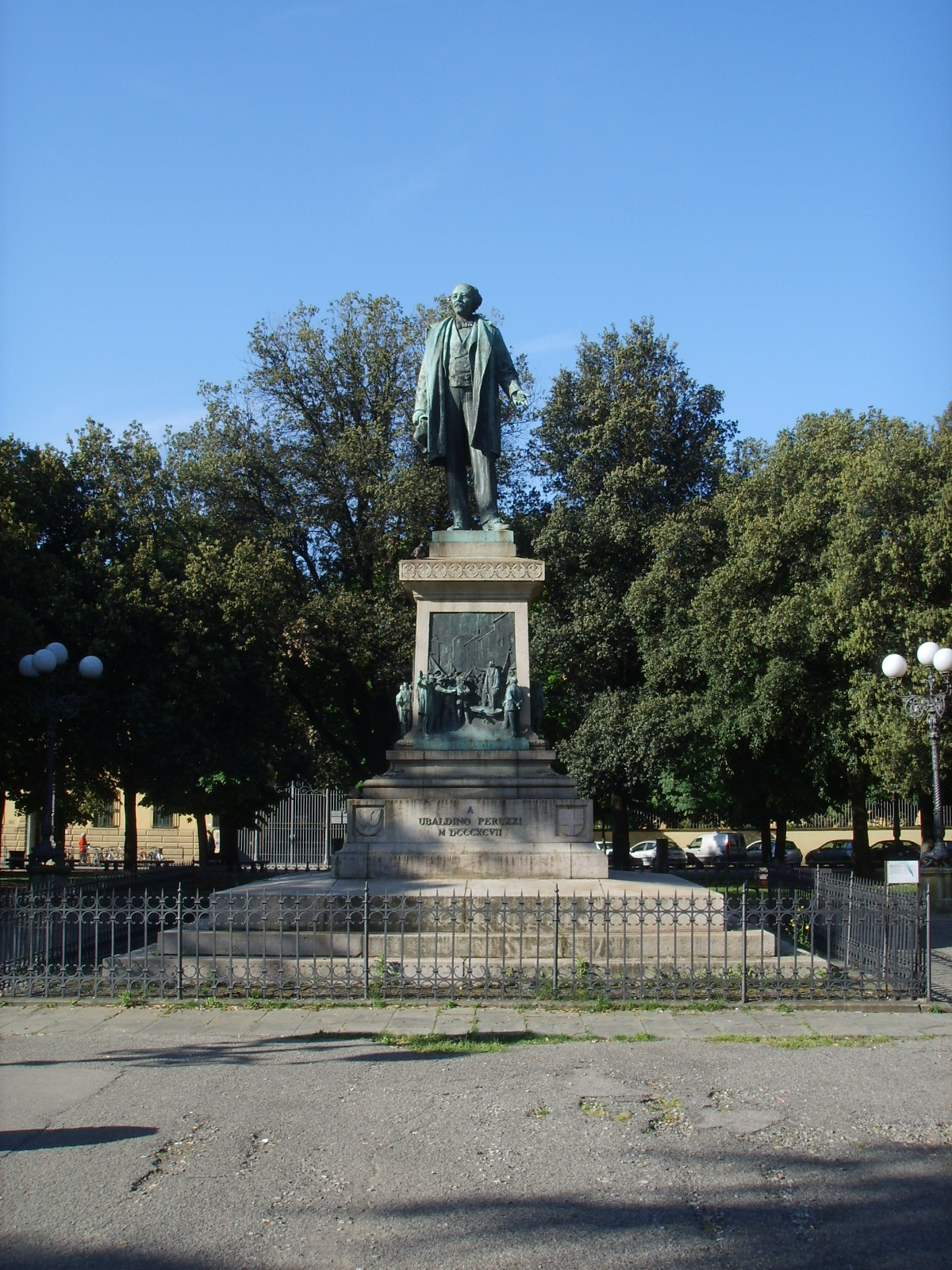
- Monument to Ubaldino Peruzzi, Florence
- Location: Piazza dell'Indipendenza, Florence, Tuscany, Italy
- Designer: Augusto Rivalta
- Type: Monument
- Material: Bronze
- Opening date: 1898
- Dedicated to: Ubaldino Peruzzi

The Monument to Ubaldino Peruzzi is a bronze statue erected in 1898 in the Piazza dell'Indipendenza in Florence, region of Tuscany, Italy.

In 1859, the Provisional Government of Tuscany, seeking to enrich the public square with patriotic memorials, sponsored a contest to create two monuments, one dedicated to Vittorio Emanuele II, the other to Napoleon III.

The Equestrian Monument to Victor Emmanuel II was designed by Salvino Salvini, who completed a stucco model in 1864. The initial plan, to fuse the statue in a single piece, was deemed too costly for the city, then engaged in converting Florence into capital of Italy. When the capital was moved soon after to Rome, the project was again shelved. Plans regained impetus in 1892 with local fundraising, and two statues were installed on April 27, 1898; these, however, were not of kings. Ubaldini Peruzzi, first mayor of Florence and erstwhile minister of the kingdom, replaced the tarnished and overthrown Napoleon III. The King Victor Emanuel II statue was replaced by the Monument to Bettino Ricasoli (former prime minister) by Augusto Rivalta. An equestrian statue of Victor Emanuel II was erected in 1890 in Piazza Vittorio Veneto.

Ubaldino Peruzzi (1822–1891) is depicted announcing on 27 April 1859, to the assembled Florentines in Piazza Maria Antonia that the Duke Leopold II had left, ending the rule of the Habspurg-Lorraine in Florence. Four bronze bas-reliefs on the base depict other episodes of Ubaldini's life:

1. In 1848, as captain of the Civic Guard, he obtains the freedom of the Tuscans captured in Battle of Curtatone and Montanara.
2. On April 27, 1859, Ubaldini announces the flight of the Grand Duke Leopold.
3. On September 20, 1870, in front of Palazzo Feroni (then town hall), Ubaldini announces the fall of Rome.
4. On September 13, 1875, Ubaldini inaugurates the statue of David in the Piazzale Michelangelo.
