= Equestrian monument to Vittorio Emanuele II, Florence =

Statue in Florence, Italy

Coordinates: 43.7765°N 11.2350°E

The Equestrian monument to Vittorio Emanuele II is an equestrian statue of the former King Vittorio Emanuele II, located in the Piazza Vittorio Veneto, a small green spot at the east end of the Parco delle Cascine, located along the Arno River, just west of central Florence, region of Tuscany, Italy.

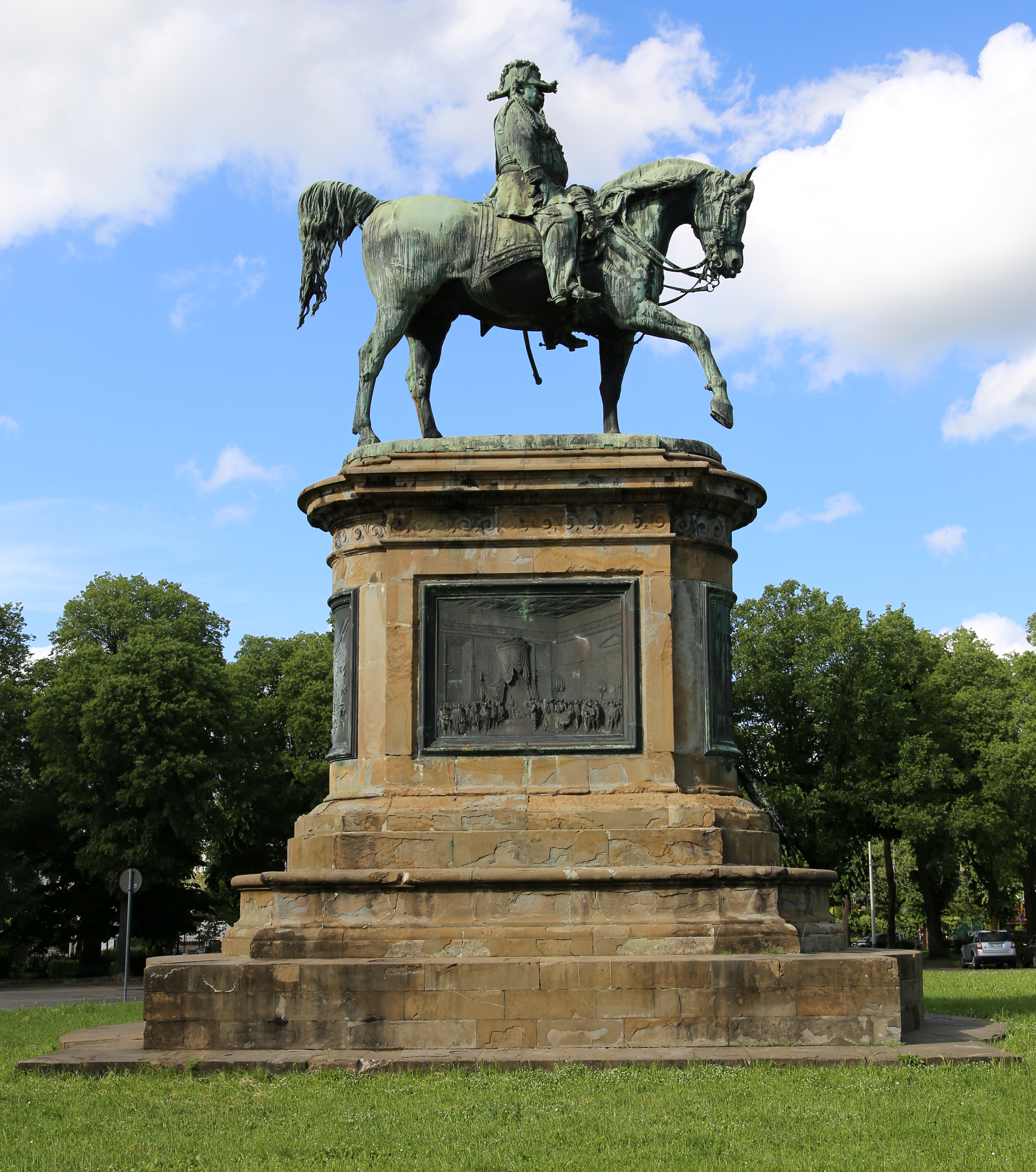
Monument

== History ==
The monument was designed by Salvino Salvini, and later modified by Emilio Zocchi, and inaugurated in 1890 in town, and moved to this site in 1932. The first design of the monument dates to 1859, after the last Duke of Lorraine fled Florence, and Tuscany joined the expanding Kingdom of Piedmont-Sardinia (now including Lombardy and other territories) ruled by Vittorio Emanuele II. The commune sponsored a competition for two equestrian monuments, one dedicated to the King of Sardinia, and the other, to Napoleon III. They were destined for the then called Piazza Maria Antonia (now Piazza dell’Indipendenza).

In 1864, Salvino Salvini's design of a larger-than-life size model was chosen for the Vittorio Emanuele monument. Napoleon III's popularity in Italy, however, dimmed after he negotiated the Treaty of Zürich with Austria-Hungary, maintaining their rule in Venetia, and what affection remained, was snuffed in 1861 when France protected Papal rule of Roman territory from Garibaldi's forces. No design for a monument for Napoleon was ever touted.

The selection of Florence as capital of Italy in 1865, set the city into urban renewal. Plans by the architect Giuseppe Poggi, moved the statue to its new location, at a prominent intersection of avenues exiting out of the city.

But the national government migrated South to Rome within a few years, quashing much of the funds for the refurbishment of Florence. Only in 1878, after the death of Vittorio Emanuele II, was the project was revived. In 1881-1882 a new competition took up a more life-size model by Emilio Zocchi. Emilio and his son, Cesare designed for Pisa a standing monument (1892) to the King.

The monument was inaugurated in 1890 in Piazza della Repubblica to a lukewarm reception. The artistry was uninspiring, and King Vittorio Emanuele II, like the Grand Duke Prince Leopold II of Lorraine before him, had only flirted with Florence, a city which had always considered itself as central to Italy as Rome itself. In 1932, with little fanfare, the equestrian statue was exiled to this more pastoral site, which had been proposed by Giuseppe Poggi.

In the base are two bronze bas-reliefs: in one, the king leaves the city to claim Rome, and in the other he receives news of the Tuscan plebiscite favoring union with the forming Kingdom of Italy. The front plaque recalls the installation, the rear plaque had the coat of arms of the House of Savoy.

The statue depicts the portly King dressed in military regalia with sword. Paradoxically, compared with the same topic, for example, in Milan (1878 by Ercole Rosa), Verona (1883), Bologna (1884 by Giulio Monteverde), Genoa (1886), Venice (1887), and Naples (1897); this steed is more sedate, perhaps wistful of an era that hoped the king would remain dismounted in his capital, but also recalling the similarly tame steeds in the late-Renaissance Florentine monuments honoring the Medici dukes Cosimo I and Ferdinando I. Each of which echoed the calm mastery of rider over horse evident in Equestrian Statue of Marcus Aurelius.

Then again, the kings of the House of Savoy were more apt to slowly parade into situations, rather than gallop into conflict. Here the rider and steed dominate only a small grass circle, and interact little with the surroundings; more sympathy is earned by the equestrian monument depicting the meeting of Vittorio Emanuele and Garibaldi (Monument to the Meeting of Teano).
