= Palazzo dell'Arcone di Piazza =

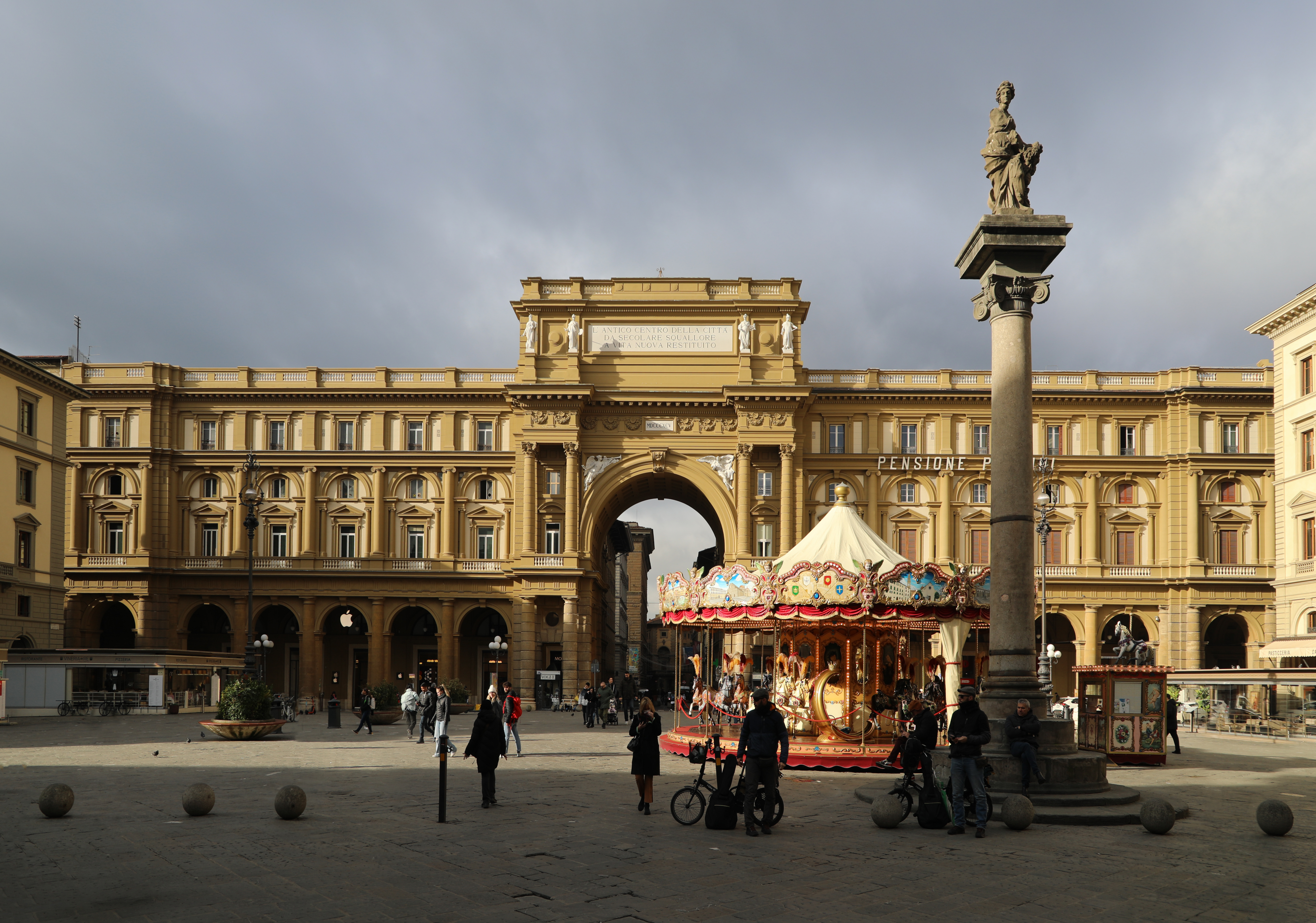
- Palazzo Borghese-Aldobrandini
- Interactive map of the Palazzo dell'Arcone di Piazza area
- Alternative names: Hotel Pensione Pendini

General information
- Status: In use
- Type: Palace
- Architectural style: Mannerist
- Location: Florence, Toscana, Italy, Piazza della Repubblica 5, angolo via degli Anselmi 2, via Pellicceria, via degli Strozzi 1- 2, via de' Brunelleschi 5
- Coordinates: 43.77152°N 11.253441°E
- Construction started: 1895

The palazzo dell’Arcone di Piazza is a civil building in the historical centre of Florence, located at Piazza della Repubblica 5, corner Via degli Anselmi 2, Via Pellicceria, Via degli Strozzi 1- 2, Via de' Brunelleschi 5.

== Preesistencies ==
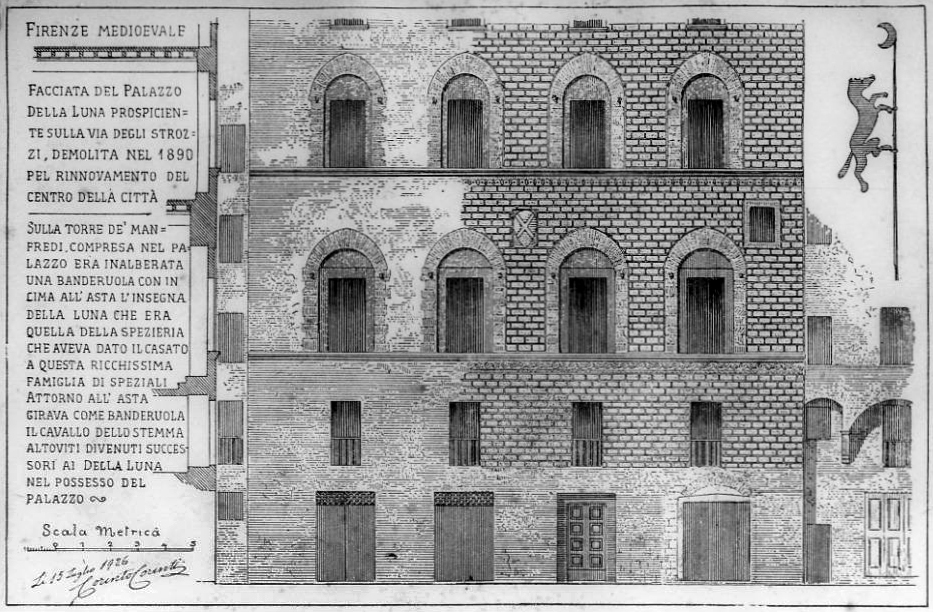
Relief of the Palazzo Della Luna

The palace was built on buildings that once faced the west side of the Mercato Vecchio square (case degli Alfieri Strinati, tower of the Tornaquinci), of via dei Naccaioli — today via dei Brunelleschi (church of Santa Maria in Campidoglio), of via Pellicceria, and on the sides of via dei Ferravecchi — today via degli Strozzi (on the north side the palazzo della Luna, on the south side the church of San Pier Buonconsiglio, a palazzo of the Sassetti and one of the Anselmi). It covered small squares and alleyways, such as the chiasso del Guanto (or del Leoncino) and di Borghese, the piazza of Santa Maria in Campidoglio and the vicolo del Campidoglio, the piazza of the Pollaioli, the alley and the piazza della Luna (the latter also known as the piazza della Paglia).

These medieval structures had in turn been built on the Roman forum of Florentia, in particular on the temple dedicated to the Capitoline Triad, on the large baths behind it, towards the west, and on a domus at Via Pellicceria. During the excavations carried out at the time of the demolitions, traces of Etruscan settlements were also found, including some Villanovan burials between via Strozzi and via dei Vecchietti.

== History and description ==
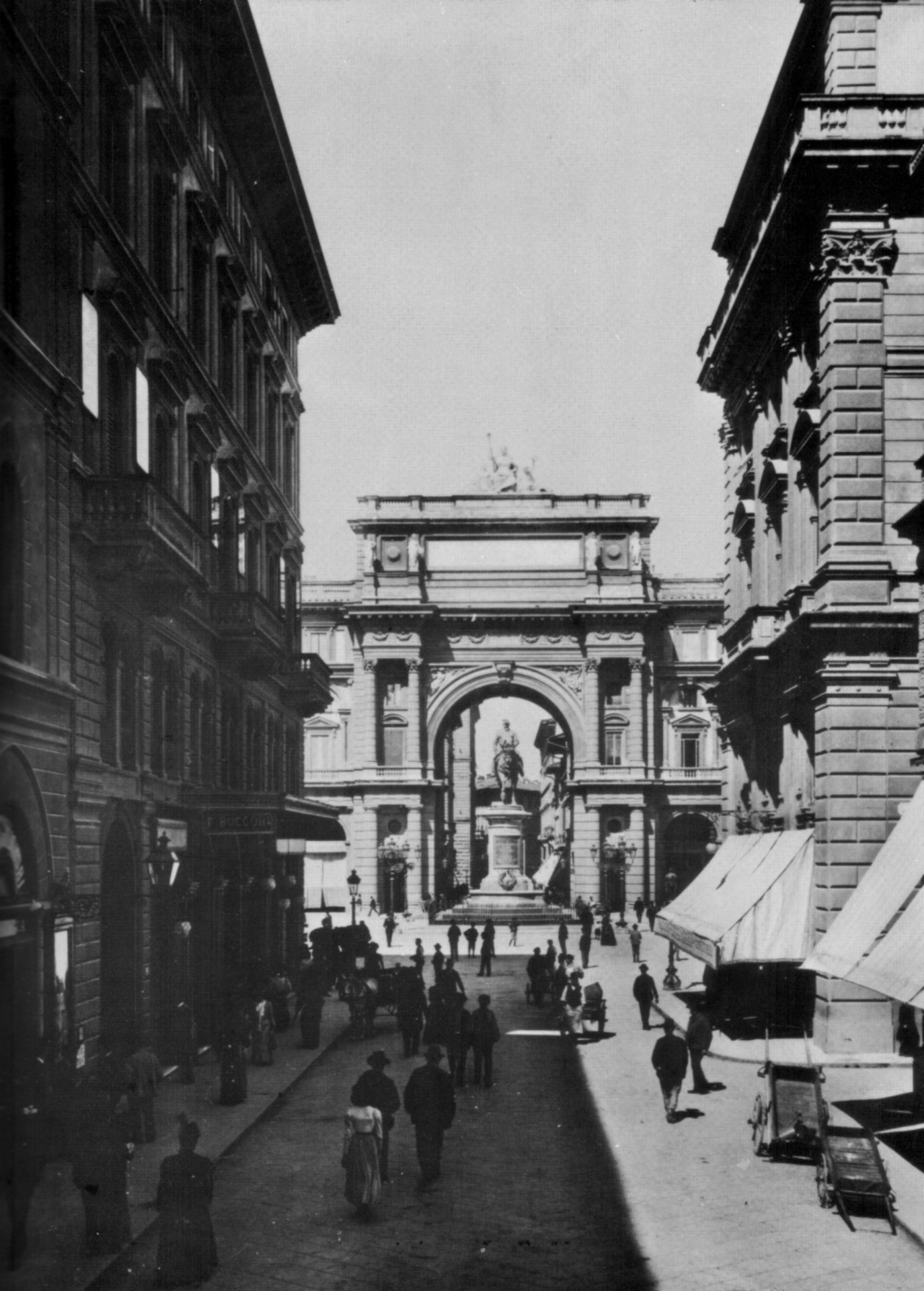
The arch and the monument to Victor Emmanuel II (Florence) seen from Via degli Speziali in the years 1890—1900

The large building, erected to a design by architect Vincenzo Micheli (1895), defines itself as a scenographic backdrop to the square, laid out from 1883 with the destruction of the Mercato Vecchio and the Jewish pond. Beyond its being a palace, the architecture transcends the need to offer a civil dwelling building in the bourgeois sense, to become a monumental urban sign, and impose itself through the great archway leading onto Via Strozzi, developed to include the two orders of the façades of the lateral buildings, each of which is developed for a further six axes, the last of which is overhanging. Each of these lateral bodies then develops deeply into the respective blocks, two internal courtyards towards via Brunelleschi, and an elongated one towards via Pellicceria. The wide and high archway with the large central body, adorned with statues and crowned by the plastic group of the Italy enthroned accompanied by the figures of Art and Science (removed in 1904), framed the equestrian statue of the king Victor Emmanuel II of Savoy, placed in the centre of the square and later moved to the Piazzale delle Cascine. The three statues were mockingly renamed by the Florentines with the names of three prostitutes of the period, as can be found in some satirical sonnets of the time by Vamba and others: the Starnotti or Schiccherona, a tenant of Russian origin whose surname was Starnowka; then the Cambarbini and the Trattienghi.

Long strongly criticised both as a symbol of the destruction of one of Florence’s oldest sites, and for its 'truncated' and un-Florentine character (there is an obvious reference to a style that is usually defined as 'Roman', understood as from the period of Rome as the capital of Italy), the building was the subject of a project drawn up by architect Marcello Piacentini in 1931 (later not implemented) that provided for the demolition of the archway and the simplification of the corners of the two adjoining buildings.

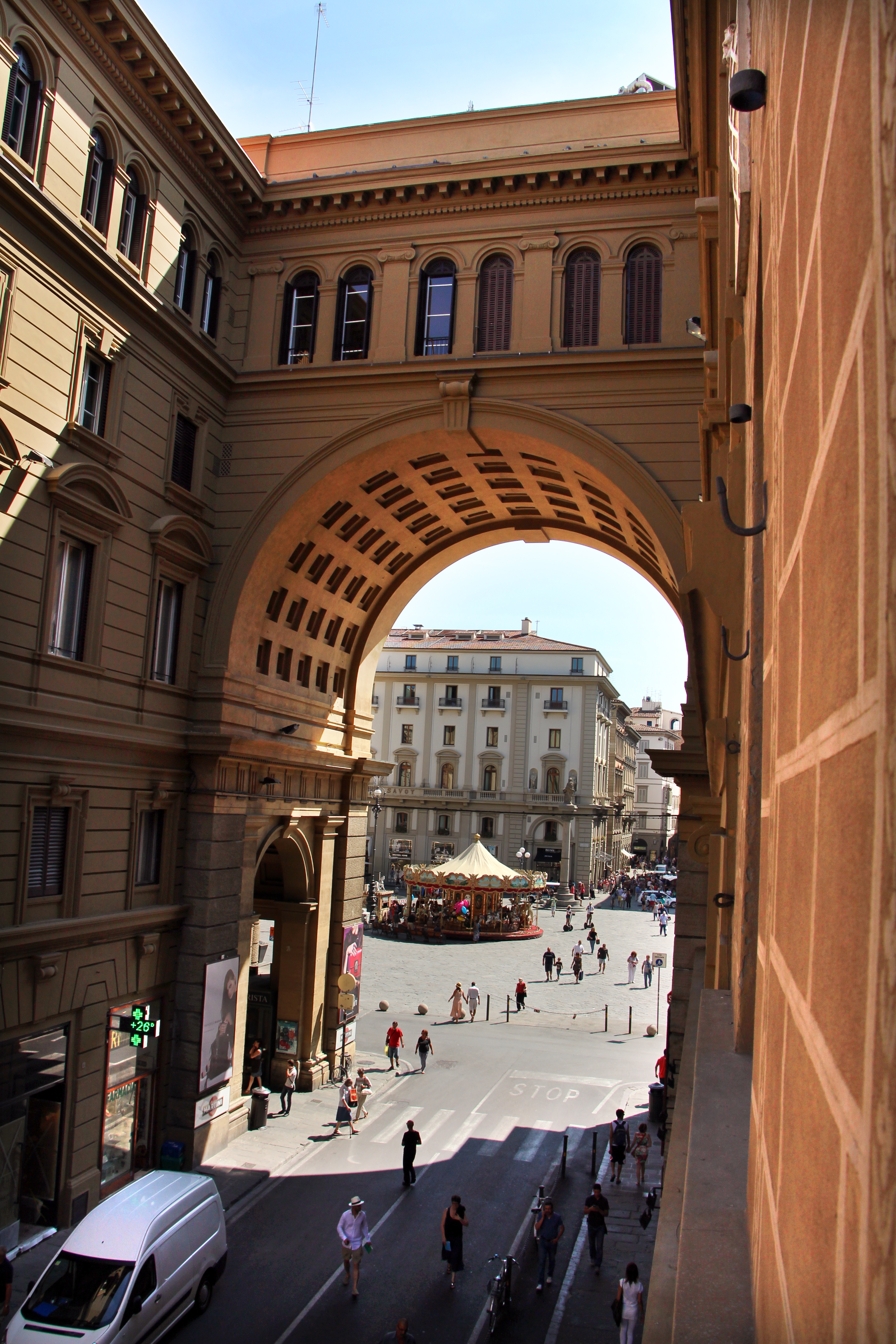
The arch seen from Via Strozzi

The monument underwent maintenance in 1938 and a complete restoration in 1980. Due to the deterioration of the stone elements and the presence of conspicuous cracks in the plasterwork (as well as the general deterioration of the four statues representing the «fine arts», Sculpture, Painting, Music and Architecture, the first two being the work of Vincenzo Rosignoli), a worksite was then opened for the consolidation and restoration of the structure in 2000, and again in 2022 with a general cleaning of the plasterwork and decorations.

The body of the building to the right of the archway has been occupied since the building’s origins by the historic Pensione Pendini (with access from Via degli Strozzi 2). Also on the same side, in the large rooms once occupied by the Edison cinema (the first Florentine cinema opened in 1900 in via degli Strozzi with access from number 1 and in 1901 moved under the porticoes), was the Edison bookshop from 1996 to 2012, spread over four floors, with long opening hours, an internal cafeteria and reading spaces with Internet locations, elements that had made it one of the city’s most popular meeting places. In the same spaces — with characters not very different from those already described — the Feltrinelli Red has been in operation since April 2014. The body to the left of the archway, long occupied on the ground floor by the BNL bank, instead saw the opening of the Apple store in September 2015, designed by Giacomo Sicuro.

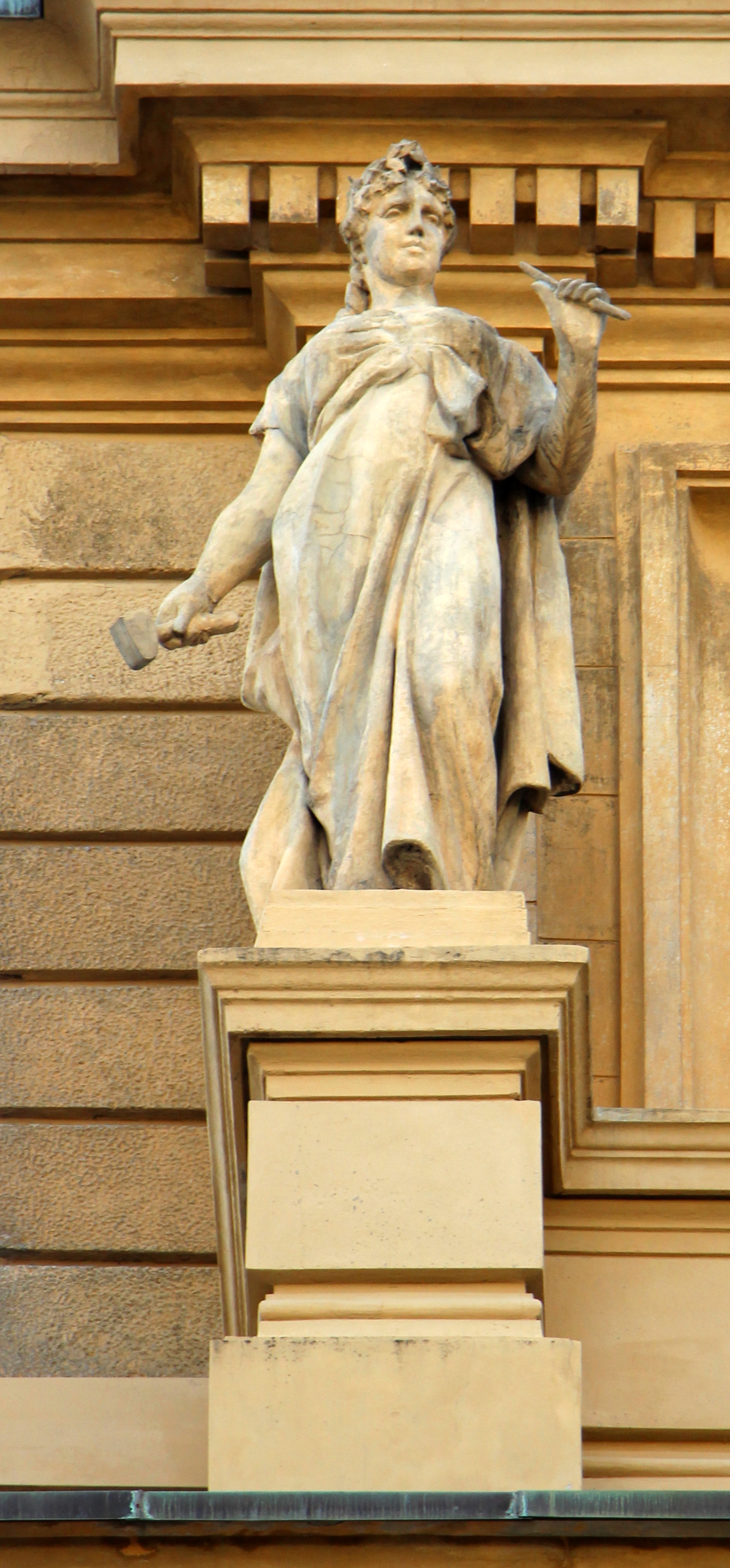
Sculpture

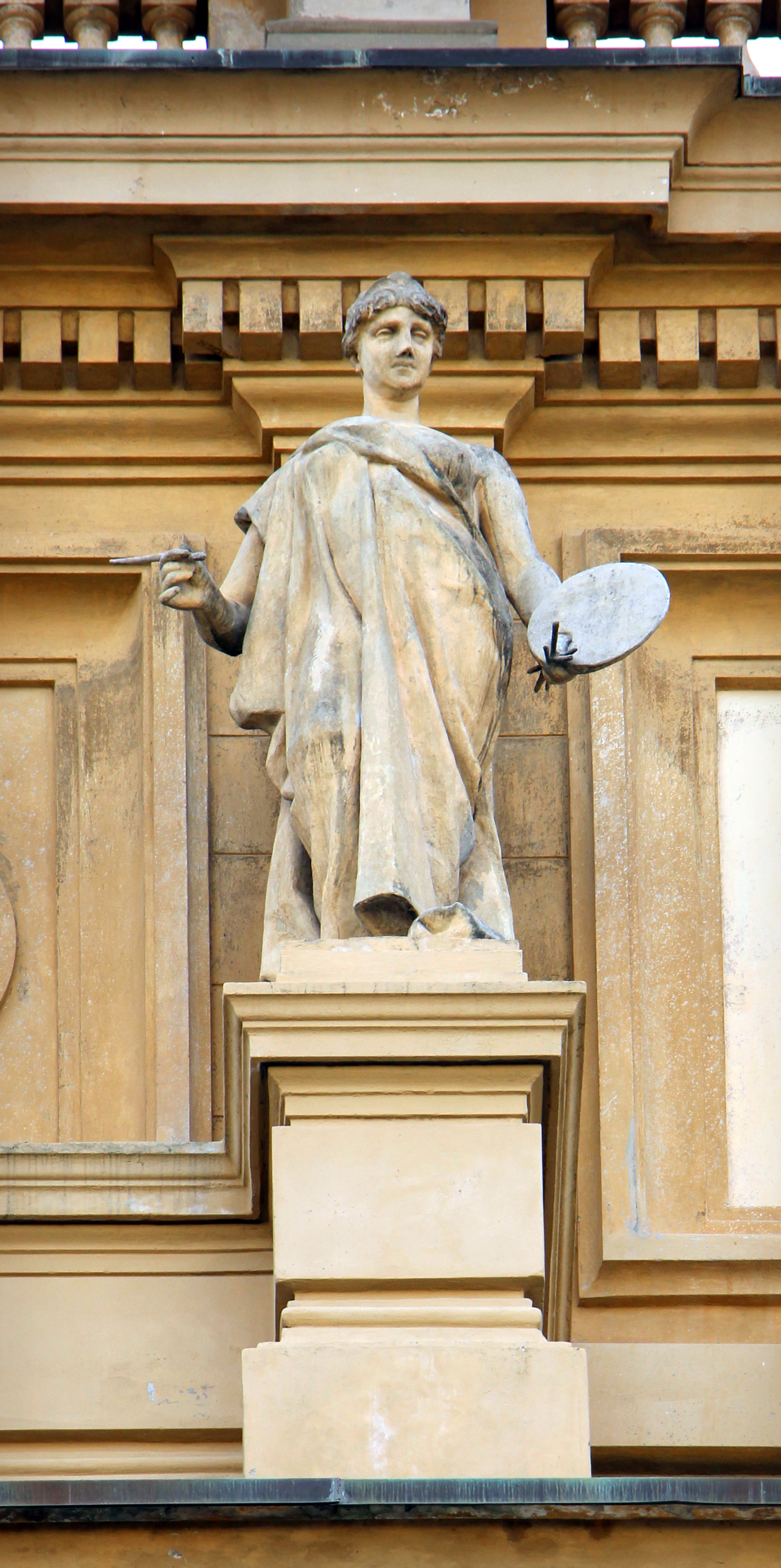
Painting

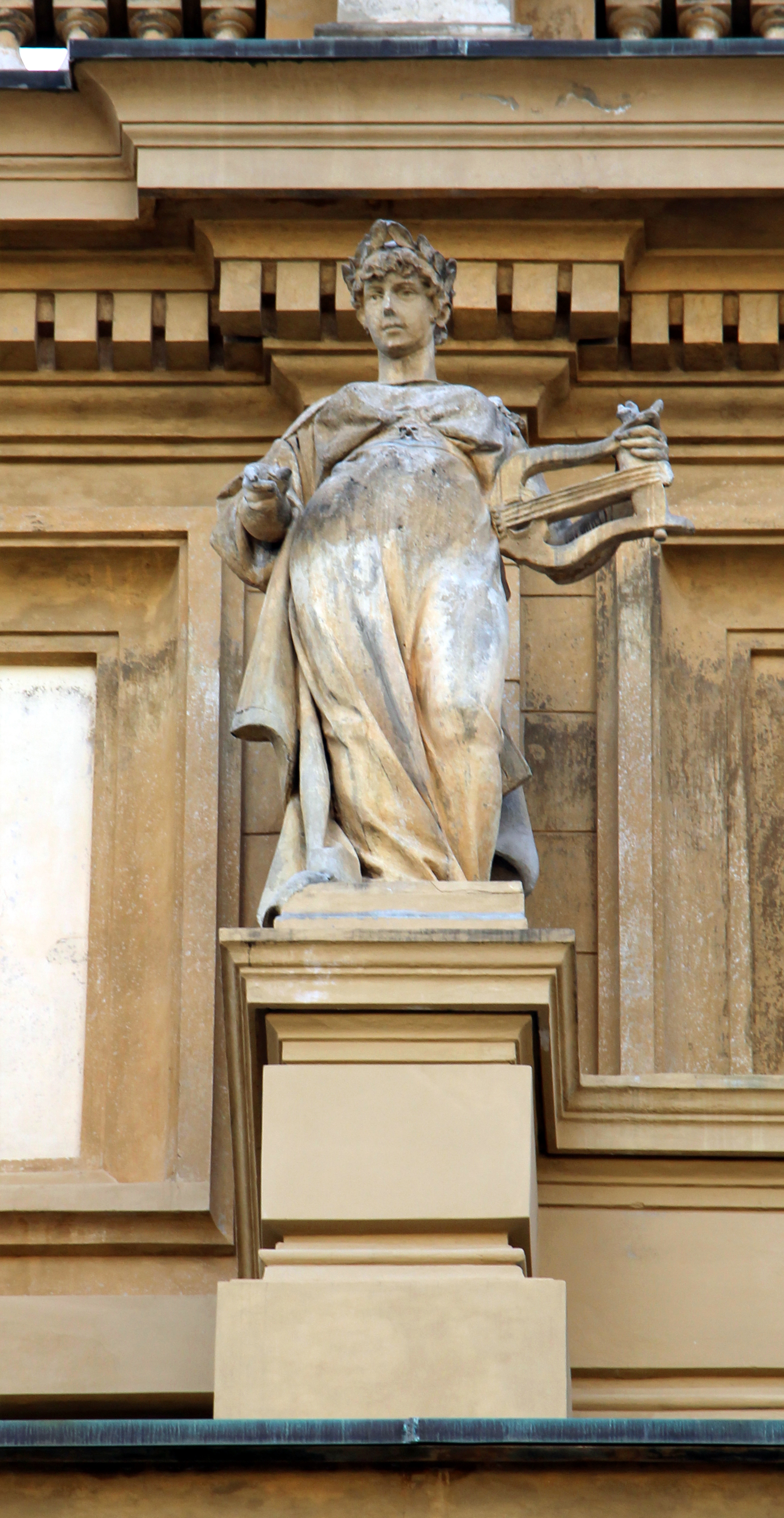
Music

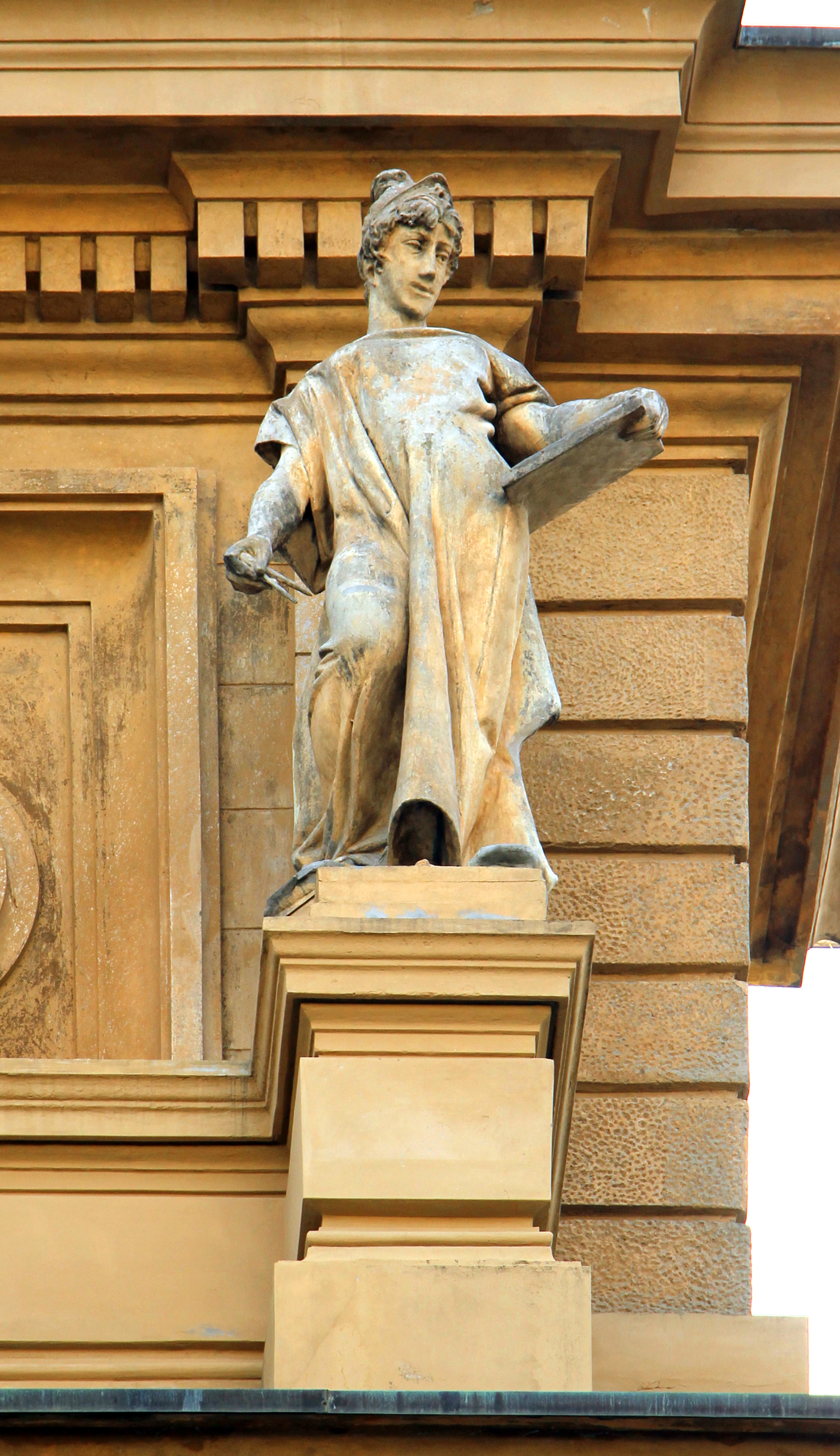
Architecture

== Bibliography ==
=== Italian sources ===
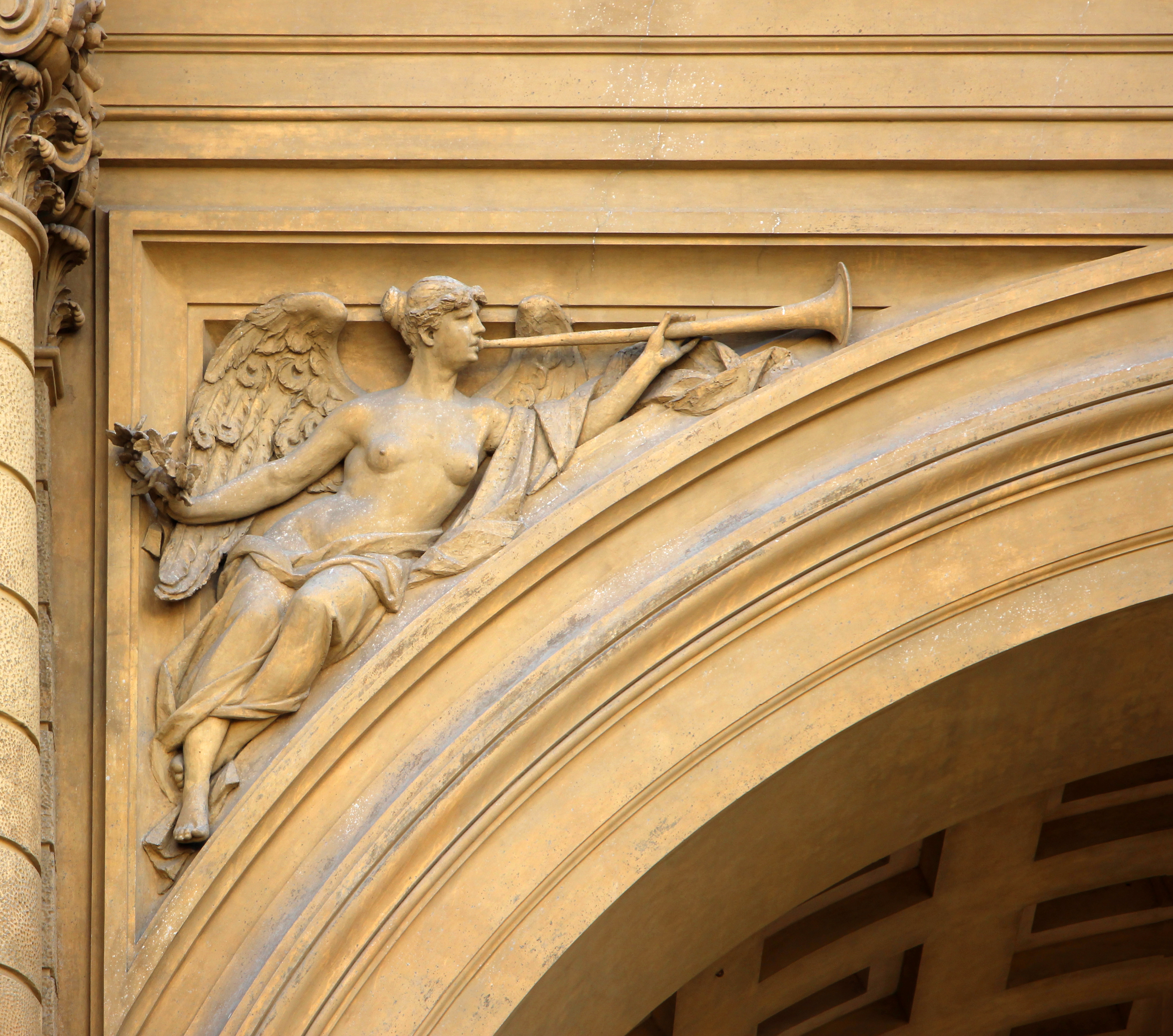
'Allegory of Fame'

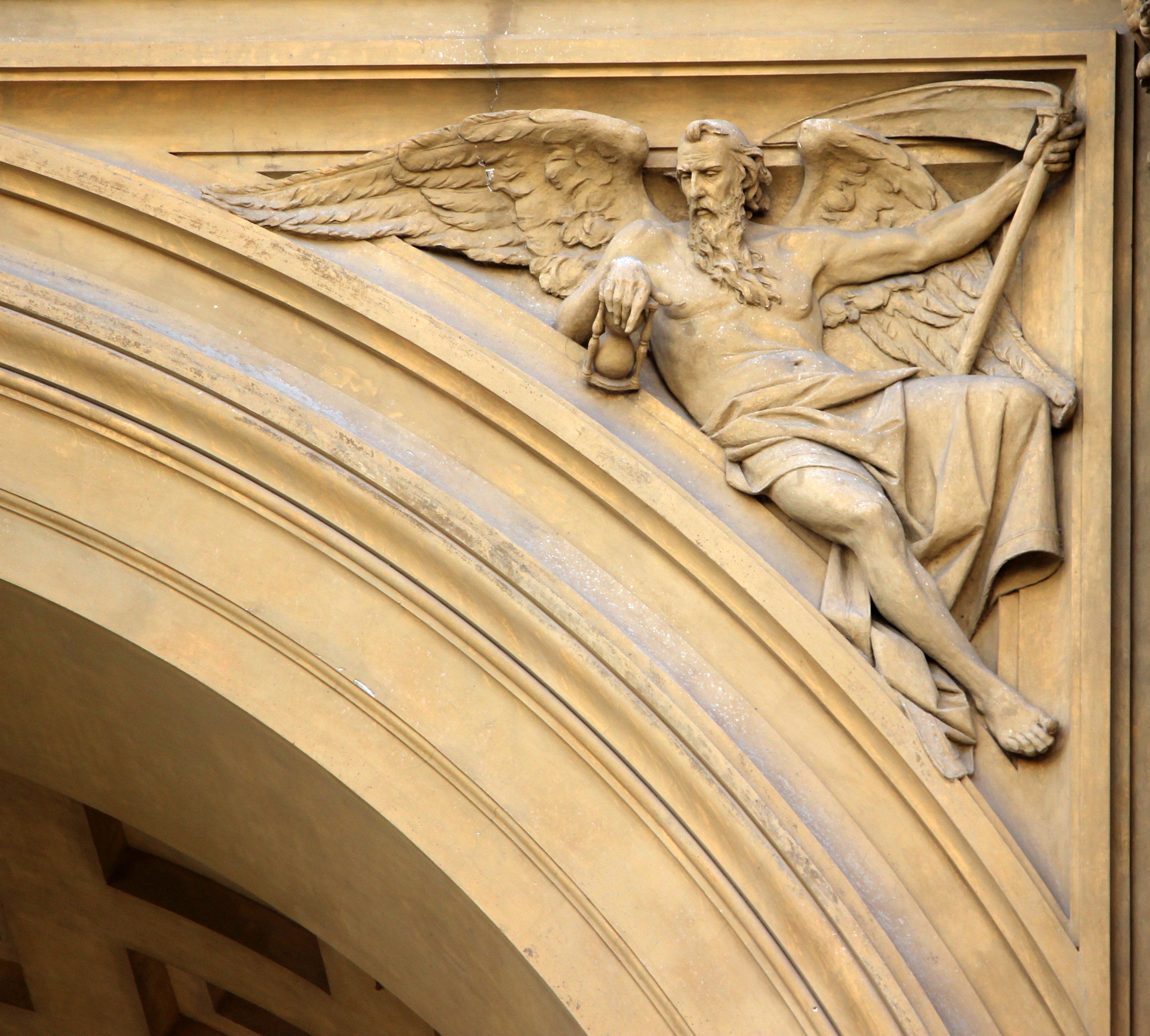
Allegory of Time'

- Centro di Firenze, in "Arte e Storia", VIII, 1889, 19, p. 150;
- Per l'arcone, in "Arte e Storia", XIII, 1894, 20, p. 160;
- L'arcone, in "Arte e Storia", XIV, 1895, 23, p. 183;
- Per l'arcone, in "Arte e Storia", XIV, 1895, 24, p. 190;
- I Palazzi fiorentini. Quartiere di San Giovanni, introduzione di Piero Bargellini, schede dei palazzi di Marcello Jacorossi, Firenze, Comitato per l’Estetica Cittadina, 1972, p. 86, n. 152;
- Piero Bargellini, Ennio Guarnieri, Le strade di Firenze, 4 voll., Firenze, Bonechi, 1977-1978, III, 1978, p. 225;
- Carlo Cresti, Luigi Zangheri, Architetti e ingegneri nella Firenze dell’Ottocento, Firenze, Uniedit, 1978, p. 158;
- Il centro di Firenze restituito. Affreschi e frammenti lapidei nel Museo di San Marco, a cura di Maria Sframeli, Firenze, Alberto Bruschi, 1989.
- Mauro Cozzi, La seconda metà dell'Ottocento, in Mauro Cozzi, Franco Nuti, Luigi Zangheri, Edilizia in Toscana dal Granducato allo Stato Unitario, Firenze, Edifir, 1992, pp. 163-201, p. 200;
- Rosamaria Martellacci in Firenze. Guida di Architettura, a cura del Comune di Firenze e della Facoltà di Architettura dell’Università di Firenze, coordinamento editoriale di Domenico Cardini, progetto editoriale e fotografie di Lorenzo Cappellini, Torino, Umberto Allemandi & C., 1992, pp. 198-199, n. 154;
- Guido Zucconi, Firenze. Guida all’architettura, con un saggio di Pietro Ruschi, Verona, Arsenale Editrice, 1995, p. 123, n. 199;
- Massimo Occupati in Comune di Firenze, Assessorato Cultura-Servizio Belle Arti, Quaderni di restauro. II, a cura di Valerio Cantafio Casamaggi, Carlo Francini, Natale Leuzzi, Firenze, Tip. G. Capponi, 2000, pp. 88-90;
- Lucia Mannini, Ambienti fiorentini e decorazioni di Vincenzo Rosignoli, in "Artista. Critica d'arte in Toscana", 2004, pp. 88-97;
- Franco Cesati, Le piazze di Firenze. Storia, arte, folclore e personaggi che hanno reso famosi i duecento palcoscenici storici della città più amata nel mondo, Roma, Newton & Compton editori, 2005, p. 189;
- Lia Invernizi, Roberto Lunardi, Oretta Sabbatini, Il rimembrar delle passate cose. Memorie epigrafiche fiorentine, Firenze, Edizioni Polistampa, 2007, II, p. 394, n. 352;
- Osanna Fantozzi Micali ed Elena Lolli, Firenze 1990-2015. Storie, cronache e percorsi d'architettura dal centro alla periferia, Firenze, edizioni Pontecorboli Editore, 2016, p. 89.
- Giorgio Venturi, Bianco e Nero, ovvero I cari estinti, Firenze, Magna Charta per Dischi Fenice, 2016, pp. 47-48.
