= Dovizia (Donatello) =

Dovizia was a 1431 monumental statue by the Italian renaissance sculptor Donatello (c. 1386–1466) once placed atop the Colonna dell'Abbodabza in the Mercato Vecchio (located in what is today the Piazza Della Repubblica) in Florence. The statue was commissioned by the Commune of Florence.

Dovizia translates as plenty (an Italianization of divitiae i.e Latin for prosperity or wealth), and was a symbol of Florence's abundance. Later miniature copies of the statue by artists such as Giovanni Della Robbia were placed in Florentine homes as symbols of fertility and a reminder to populate. It has been argued that the statue was created in part for its value as a work of Florentine political propaganda as preceded in history by Trajan's Column in Imperial Rome.

The statue had a large basket of fruit on its head and carried a cornucopia in one arm.

The work was carved from pietra serena a blue sandstone heavily used in architectural detailing in renaissance Florence.

The decaying Donatello statue, whose head had fallen off, was removed in 1721 and replaced by one of the same subject by Giambattista Foggini.

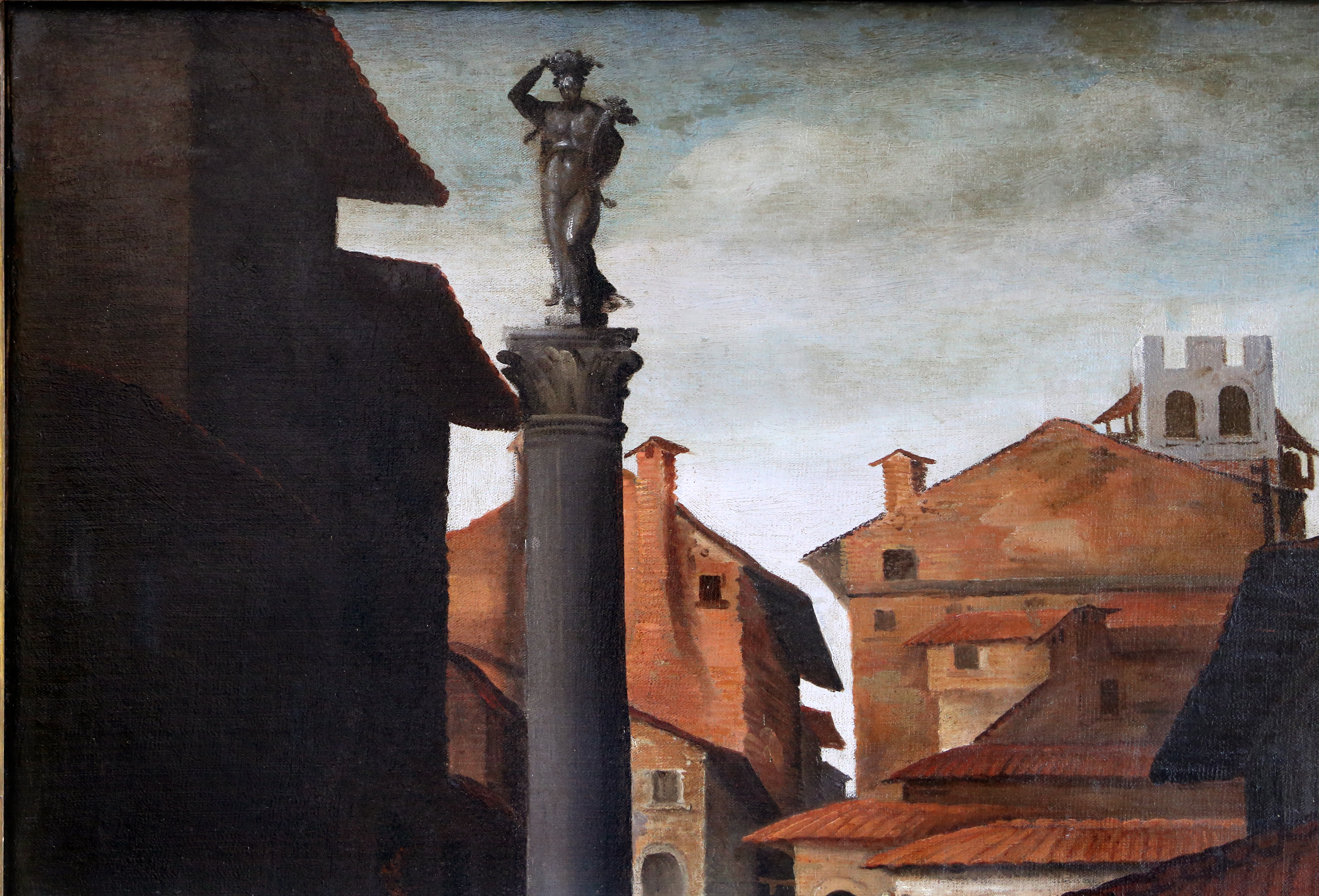
Filippo napoletano (attr.), piazza del mercato vecchio a firenze, 1600-30
