= Colonna dell'Abbondanza, Florence =

Coordinates: 43°46′18″N 11°15′16″E

The Colonna dell'Abbondanza is a monumental column located in the Piazza della Repubblica in Florence, region of Tuscany, Italy.

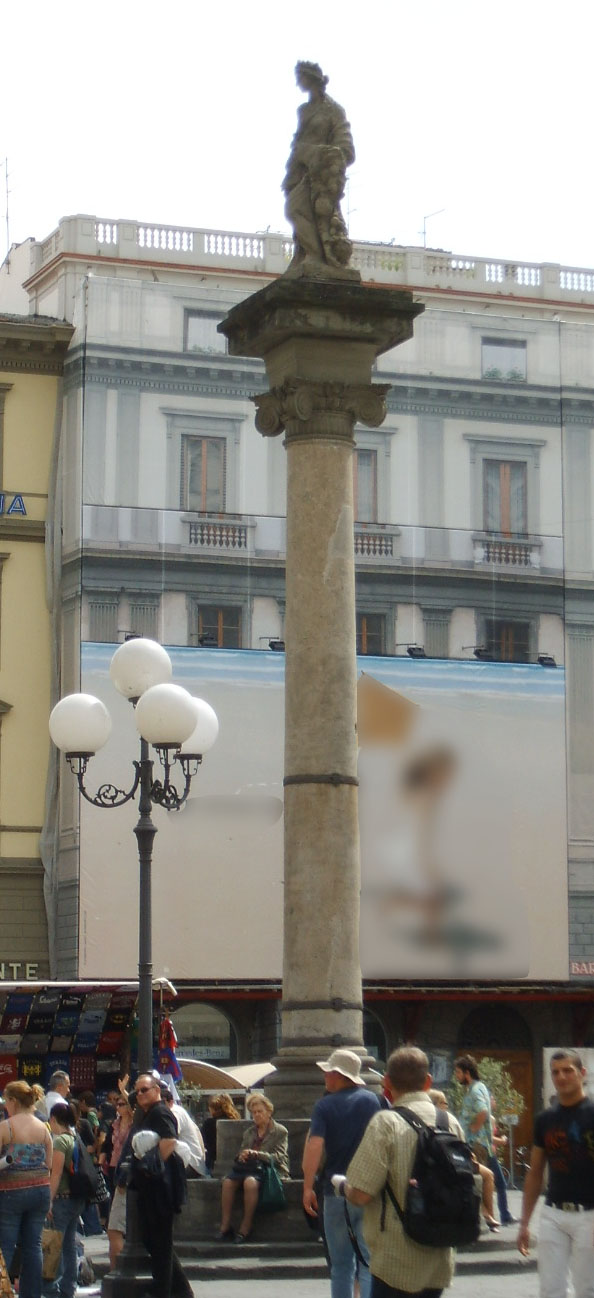
Modern Column

== History ==
While the open Piazza we see today dates to the 19th-century clearing of the Mercato Vecchio in Florence, a column at the site was erected in the 15th century, at the intersection of the Roman grid roads, the Cardo and Decumanus Maximus, thus once forming the center of Ancient Roman Florence.

It is likely a monument at the site was present in Ancient Florence, this column, made from gray granite from Elba, was erected initially in 1430–1431 by the civic officers of the neighborhood. At the summit, originally was placed a pietra serena statue by Donatello, depicting an allegory of la Dovizia (Abundance), holding a cornucopia, a theme befitting the surrounding marketplace.

Attached to the column were two chains: one rung the open and close of market, while the other was used to chain swindlers and insolvent debtors for public shaming. In this it served a similar role to the Column of the Vicariate in Naples.

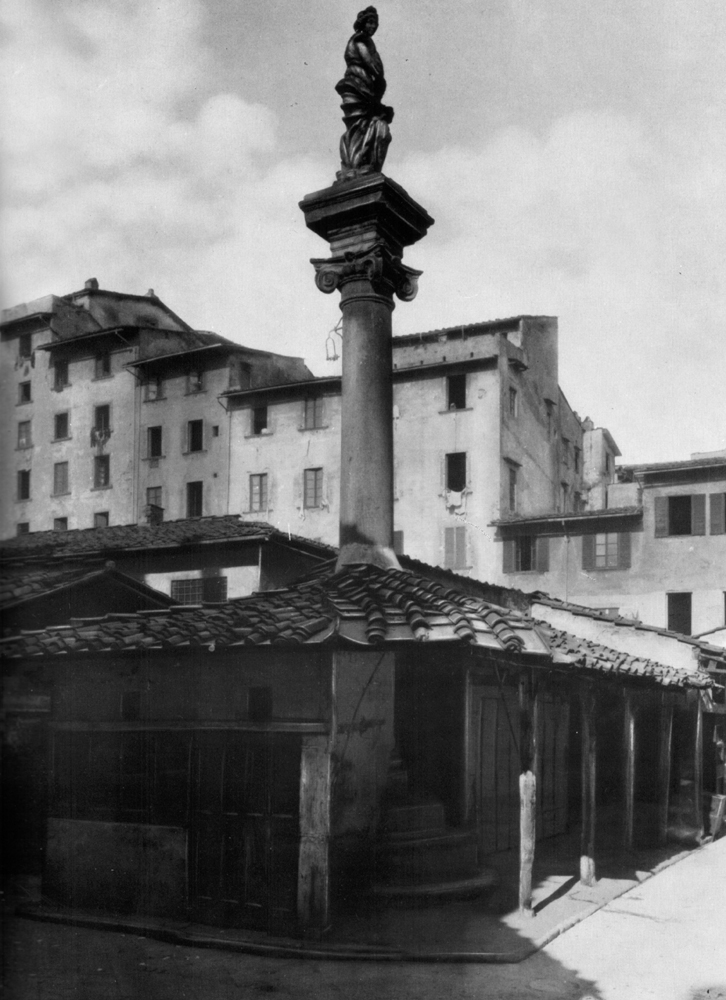
Column prior to 1881, with bell visible.

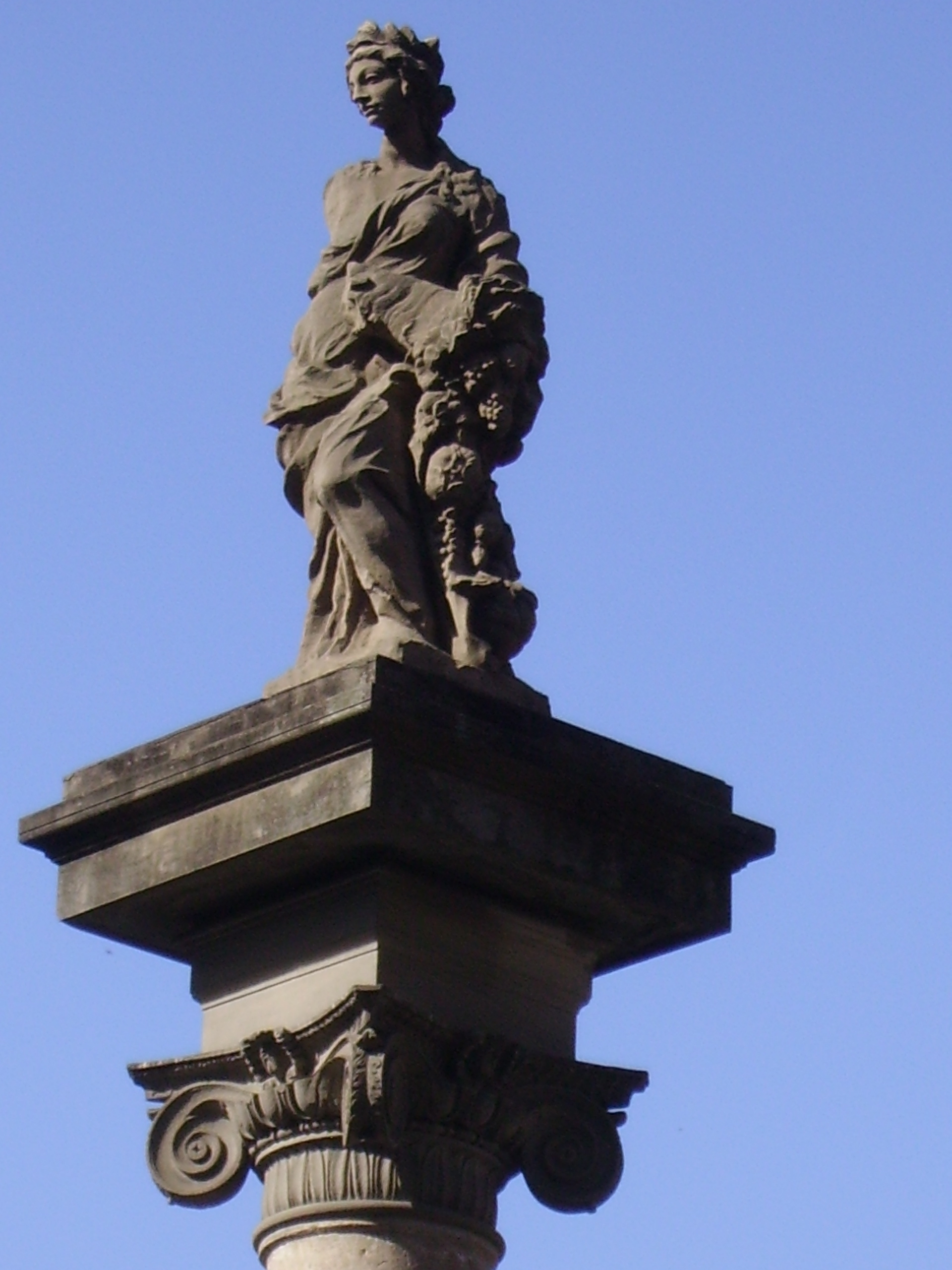
Abundance statue

Weather-worn, the head of Donatello's statue fell and was destroyed, the statue was removed in 1721, and replaced by a marble statue by Giovanni Battista Foggini.

During the clearing of the Piazza between 1885 and 1895, the column was dismantled, and the components stored in various sites. Only in 1956, under the engineer Giulio Cesare Lensi Orlandi Cardini, and funded by the local Azienda del Turismo, the column was reassembled with a bronze copy of Foggini's statue by Mario Moschi.

The column is sited some two meters from its original position.
