= Monument to Bettino Ricasoli, Florence =

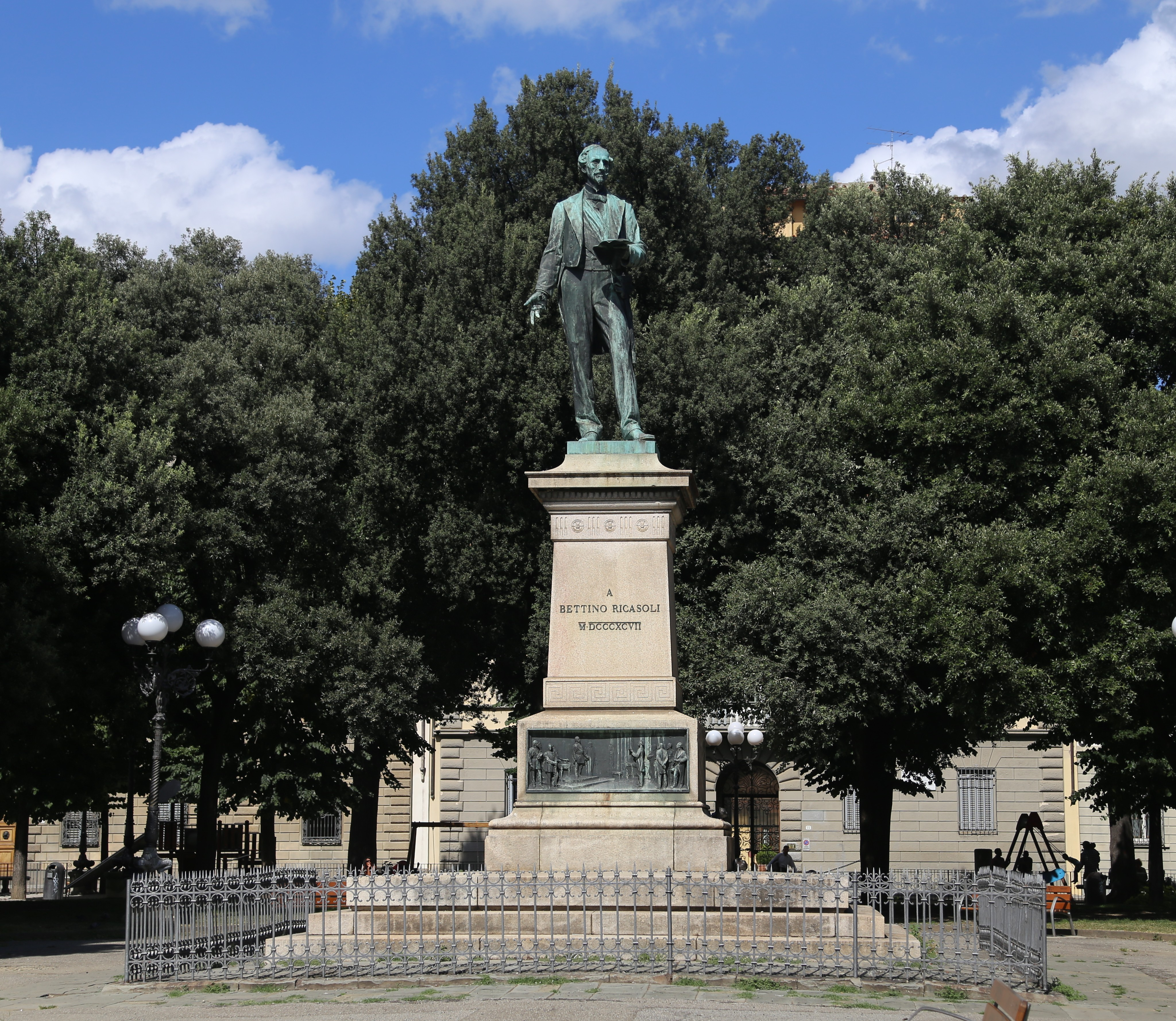
Monument to Bettino Ricasoli, Florence

A Monument to Bettino Ricasoli is a bronze statue with a plinth adorned with two bronze bas-reliefs that honors the 19th-century Italian patriot and statesman, Bettino Ricasoli, and is located in the Piazza dell'Indipendenza in Florence, region of Tuscany, Italy.

== History ==
It had been initially planned to erect an equestrian monument dedicated to King Vittorio Emanuele II in this plaza. A clay model was created by the sculptor Salvino Salvini in 1864. But by 1872, the capital had been transferred to Rome, and the ambitious project was scrapped by the commune, in part piqued at the snub of Florence and in part due to restricted finances.

In 1892, a project was formed to decorate this piazza with local patriots. One statue was raised was as a Monument to Ubaldino Peruzzi, first mayor of Florence and later minister of the realm. The second was this monument to Bettino Ricasoli. The design is attributed to Augusto Rivalta. The monuments were inaugurated on April 27, 1898, the anniversary of the flight from Florence of Leopold II, the last ruling Habsburg Grand Duke of Tuscany. The bas-reliefs depict: Bettino Ricasoli presenting the results of the Tuscan plebiscite agreeing to union with Italy to King Vittorio Emanuele and the Visit of Vittorio Emanuele in 1863 to the Castello di Brolio owned by Ricasoli. The statue depicts Ricasoli presenting the plebiscite results.
