= Loggia del Pesce =

Coordinates: 43°46′16.83″N 11°15′54.14″E

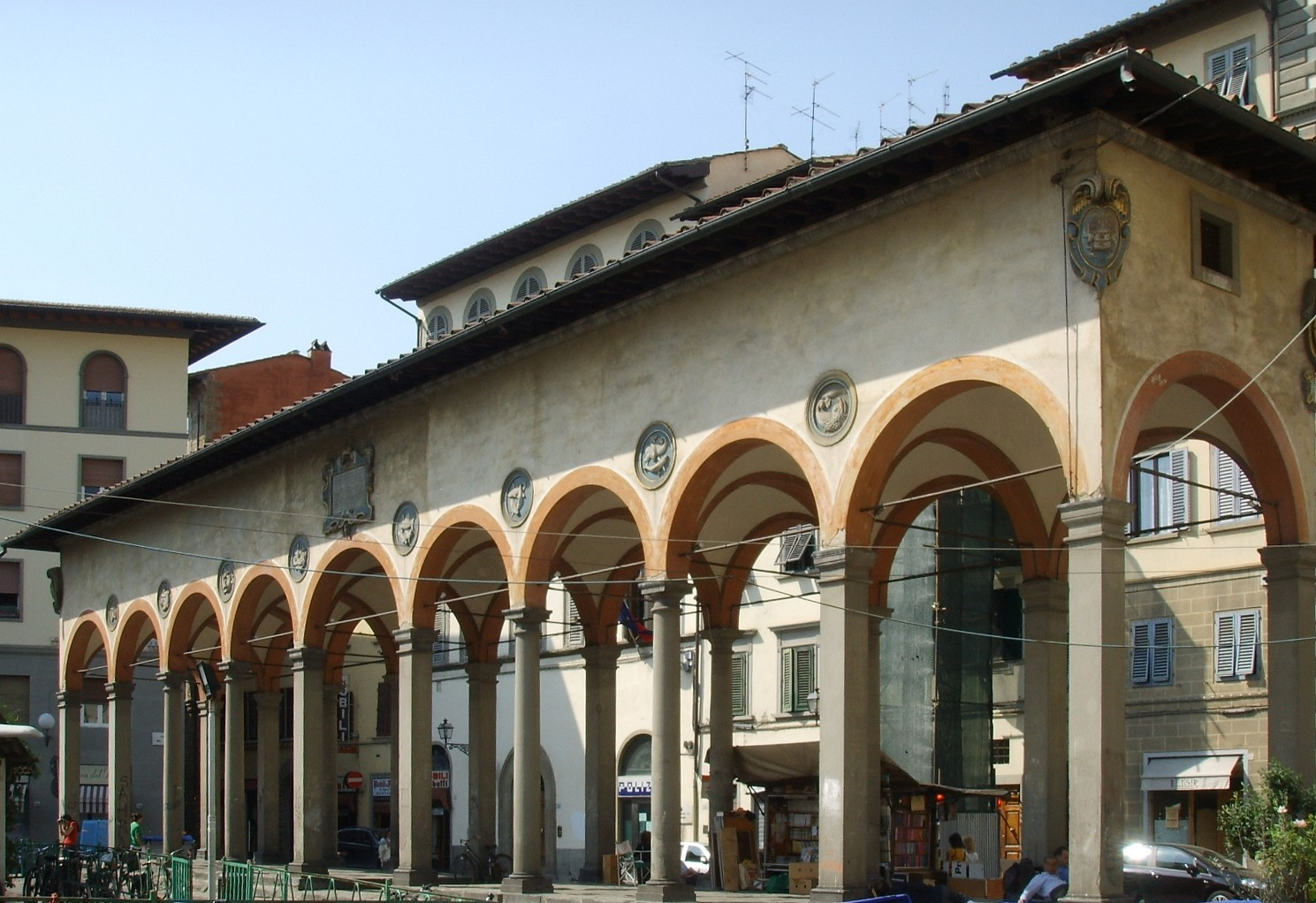
Loggia del Pesce

The Loggia del Pesce is a historical building in Florence, Italy. It is formed by nine wide arcades, supported by piers or columns. On each side are eight medallions depicting fishing activities and the sea. At the corners are four coats of arms.

It was commissioned by Duke Cosimo I de' Medici to Giorgio Vasari, to house the fish market which had been previously held near the Ponte Vecchio. Their place there was taken by the Vasari Corridor.

During the urban renovation of Florence following the unification of Italy (1885–1895), the loggia was dismantled and most of its decoration went to the museum of San Marco. It was rebuilt in the Piazza Ciompi only in 1956, re-using most of the original materials.

== Sources ==
- Bargellini, Piero (1998). Com'era Firenze 100 anni fa. Florence: Bonechi.
