= The Encounter of Teano, Fiesole =

Statue by Oreste Calzolari in Fiesole, Italy

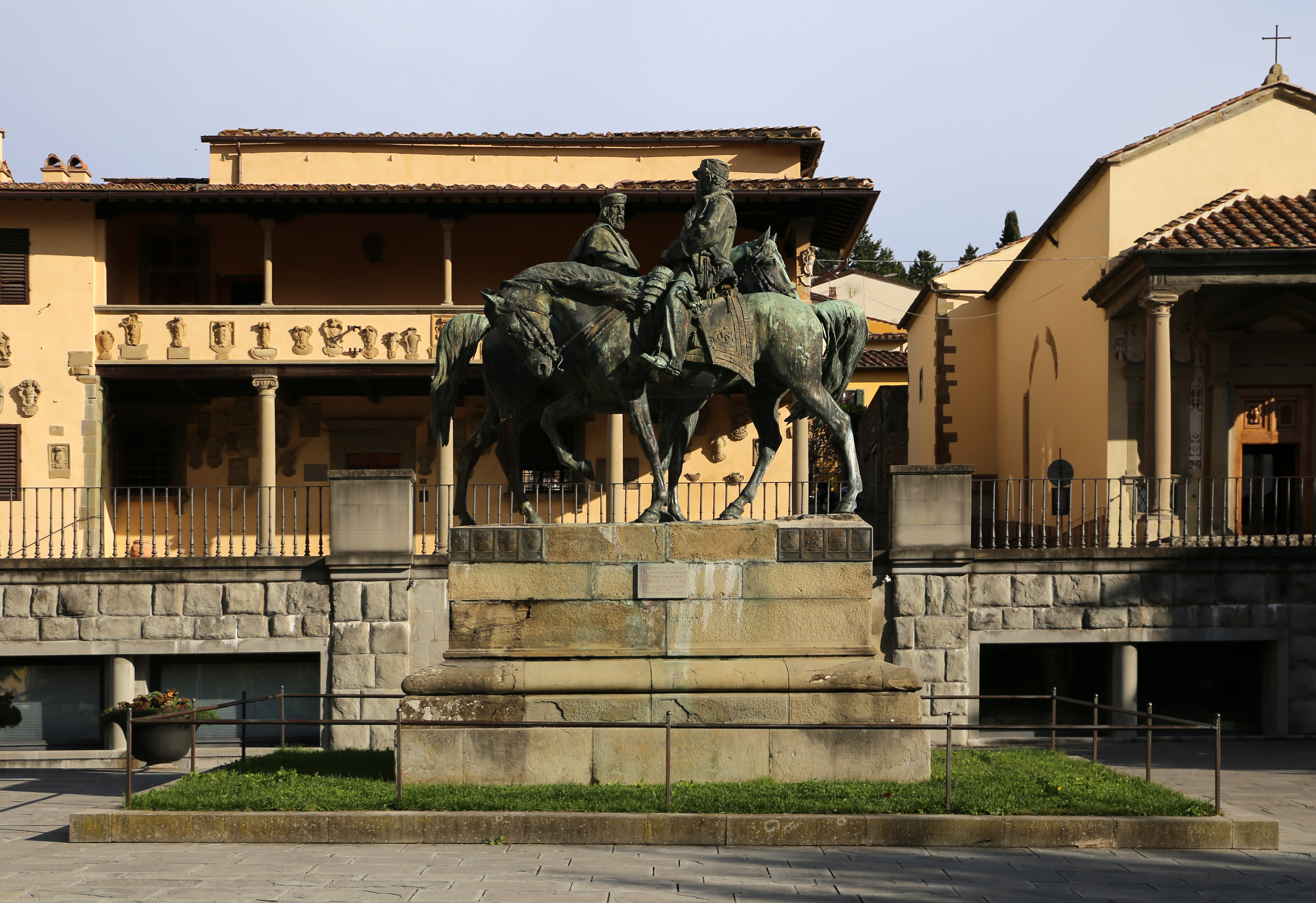
The Encounter of Teano, Fiesole

The Encounter of Teano (L'Incontro di Teano) is a bronze monumental equestrian statuary group depicting the encounter of King Vittorio Emanuele II and Garibaldi, both on horseback, at a bridge in Teano on October 26, 1860. The monument is present in the piazza Mino da Fiesole, in front of the Palazzo Pretorio in Fiesole, Tuscany, Italy.

== History ==
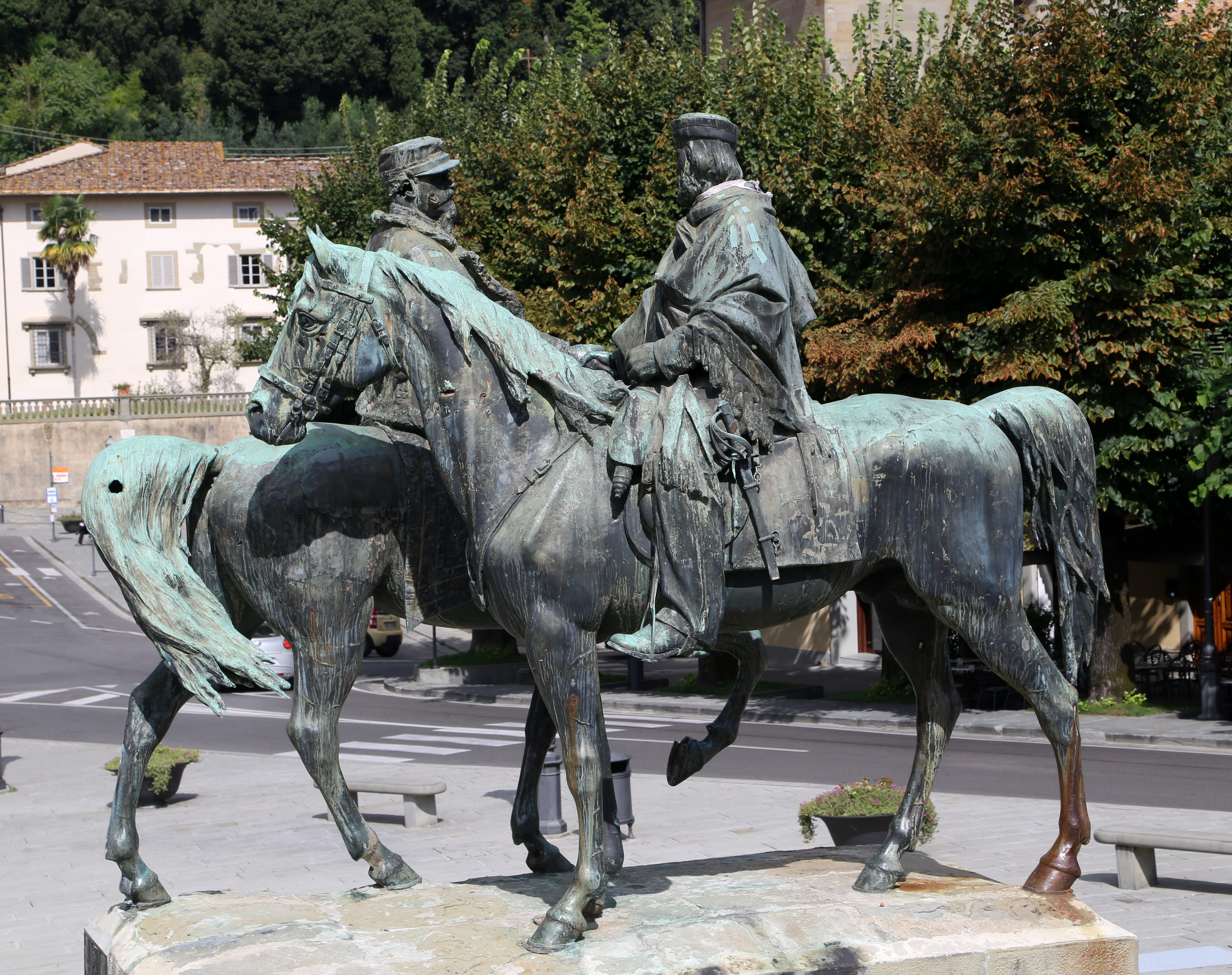
Monument with Garibaldi in forefront in photo

The statue was designed by Oreste Calzolari and inaugurated in 1906. Originally the work had an accompanying stone obelisk which was destroyed during a bombing raid during World War II.

At the meeting at the bridge, after the successful Expedition of the Thousand, defeating the forces of the Kingdom of the Two Sicilies, Garibaldi hailed Vittorio Emanuele II as king of an Italy stretching from the Alps to Sicily. One source says that the sculptor intended the statues for a monument in Teano, but the town could not raise the 3625 lire that it cost to make the statues. Instead a number of wealthy patrons and other donors in Fiesole were able to purchase the statues. Not unexpectedly, the men face in opposite directions while they shake hands, with the King's horse slightly more nervously a pace. Garibaldi's steed has a regal passivity.

See the painting by Carlo Ademollo depicting The Handshake of Teano.
