= Triumphal Arch of the Lorraine, Florence =

Monument welcoming the Habsburg-Lorraine dynasty to Italy

Coordinates: 43°47′03″N 11°15′43″E

The Triumphal Arch of the Lorraine located in Piazza della Libertà in Florence, Italy, is an 18th-century, monumental triumphal arch, bypassed by the viali di Circonvallazione that skirt Florence through the space once girded by its 16th-century walls. The piazza stands at the northernmost end of Via Cavour, Florence, region of Tuscany, Italy.

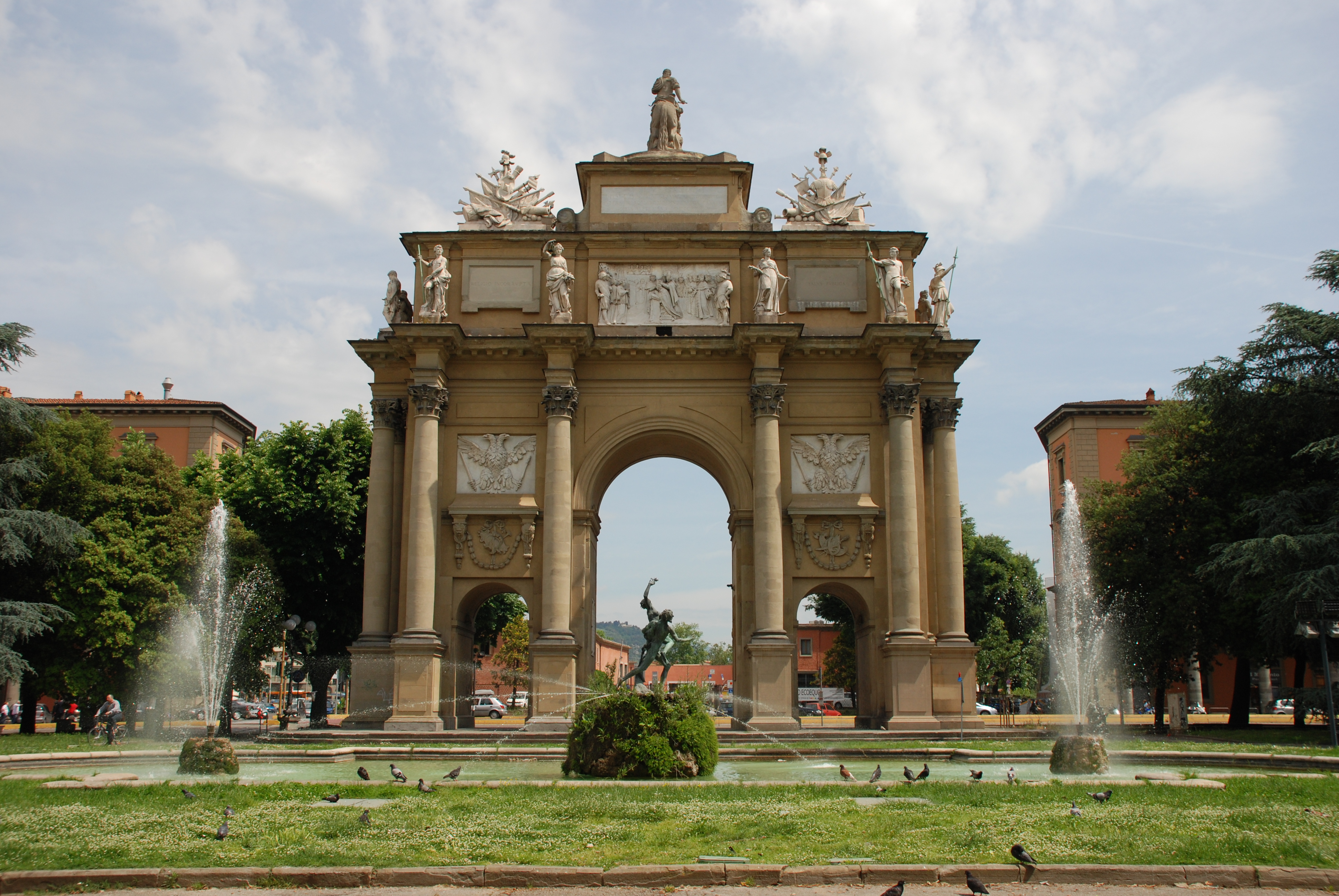
Arca di Lorena

The arch was begun after 1737 to welcome the January 1739 arrival of the Habsburg-Lorraine dynasty; it was past this arch that the same dynasty was to leave for exile in 1859.

== History ==
The arch has emanated a foreign aura since its erection in 1737–1739 by the newly arrived French architect, Jean Nicolas Jadot, to welcome the arrival (or visit) of the new ruler Francis Stephen, former Duke of Lorraine. Some sources add the efforts of Francesco Schamant of Lorraine to the design. The statuary was not added until 1744. However, many ephemeral decorations including tapestries were used along Via San Gallo to welcome the ruler in January 1739. This new duke's stay in Florence was short lived as he quickly moved to Vienna to become emperor. The next duke, Francis' second son, Viennese-born Leopold, would not be named duke until 1765, when he moved to Florence with his Spanish-born wife.

The Arch rises in a park formed by Piazza della Liberta; the arch is just centripetal to the now detached San Gallo Gate, once the main northern gate of the city. The park is located in an island surrounded by a series of homogeneous porticoed palaces, designed by Giuseppe Poggi in the 19th century, who also landscaped the park.

The arch has three openings, a larger central one with two smaller lateral ones. The arch is bedecked with ten columns with Corinthian capitals. Most of the sculptures and reliefs were requisitioned locally. It has bas-reliefs celebrating the imperial role in Italy, along with depictions of flags and weapons. The southern facade has two double-headed eagles, the symbol of the Habsburg dynasty. Atop the arch is an equestrian statue, putatively of Francis Stephen himself, apparently marching out of the city. Atop the apparently safe perch of the plinth, cringe nearly a half-dozen allegorical mythologic statues, as if they were the last Austrian contingent in Tuscany, besieged by the swirling Italian traffic around the park. It is said that crowds in 1859 belittled the fleeing Duke Leopold II as the second Baby Leopold, the prior one entering Florence under regency.
