= Piazzale Michelangelo =

Square in Florence, Italy

Coordinates: 43°45′46.0″N 11°15′54.2″E

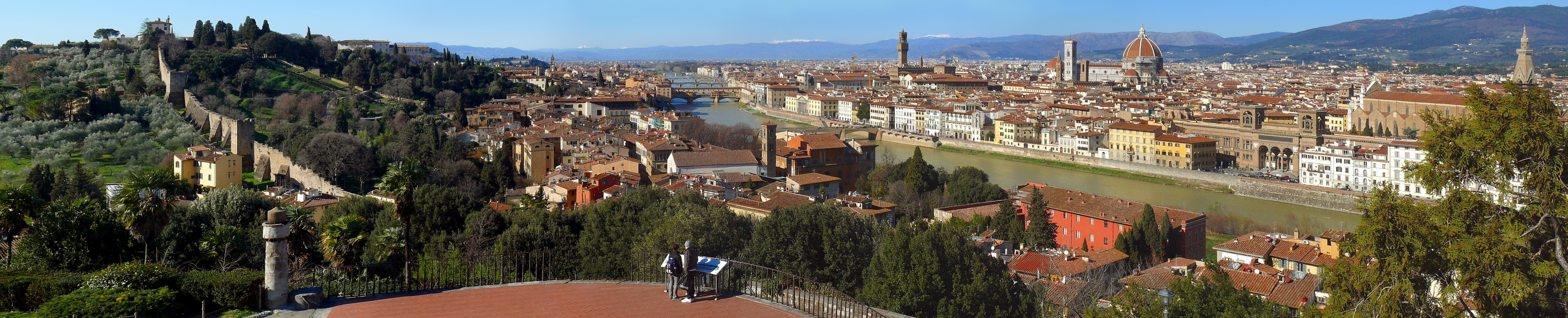
Panoramic view of the piazza

Piazzale Michelangelo (Michelangelo Square) is a square with a panoramic view of Florence, Italy, located in the Oltrarno district.

== History ==
This Florentine piazza was designed by architect Giuseppe Poggi and built in 1869 on a hill just south of the historic center, during the redevelopment of Oltrarno, the left (south) bank of the Arno river. In 1869, Florence was the capital of Italy and the city was involved in an urban renewal, the so-called Risanamento or the Renovation of the city's neighborhoods. Lungarni (riverside walkways; "lungarno", singular) were built on the river banks. On the right bank, the fourteenth-century city walls were removed and turned into the Viali di Circonvallazione, mimicking French boulevard design, six lanes wide and lined with trees. On the left bank, winding up the hill of San Miniato the Viale dei Colli was built, an 8 kilometers long street lined with trees ending at the Piazzale Michelangelo, which was built as a broad terrace with a panoramic city view.

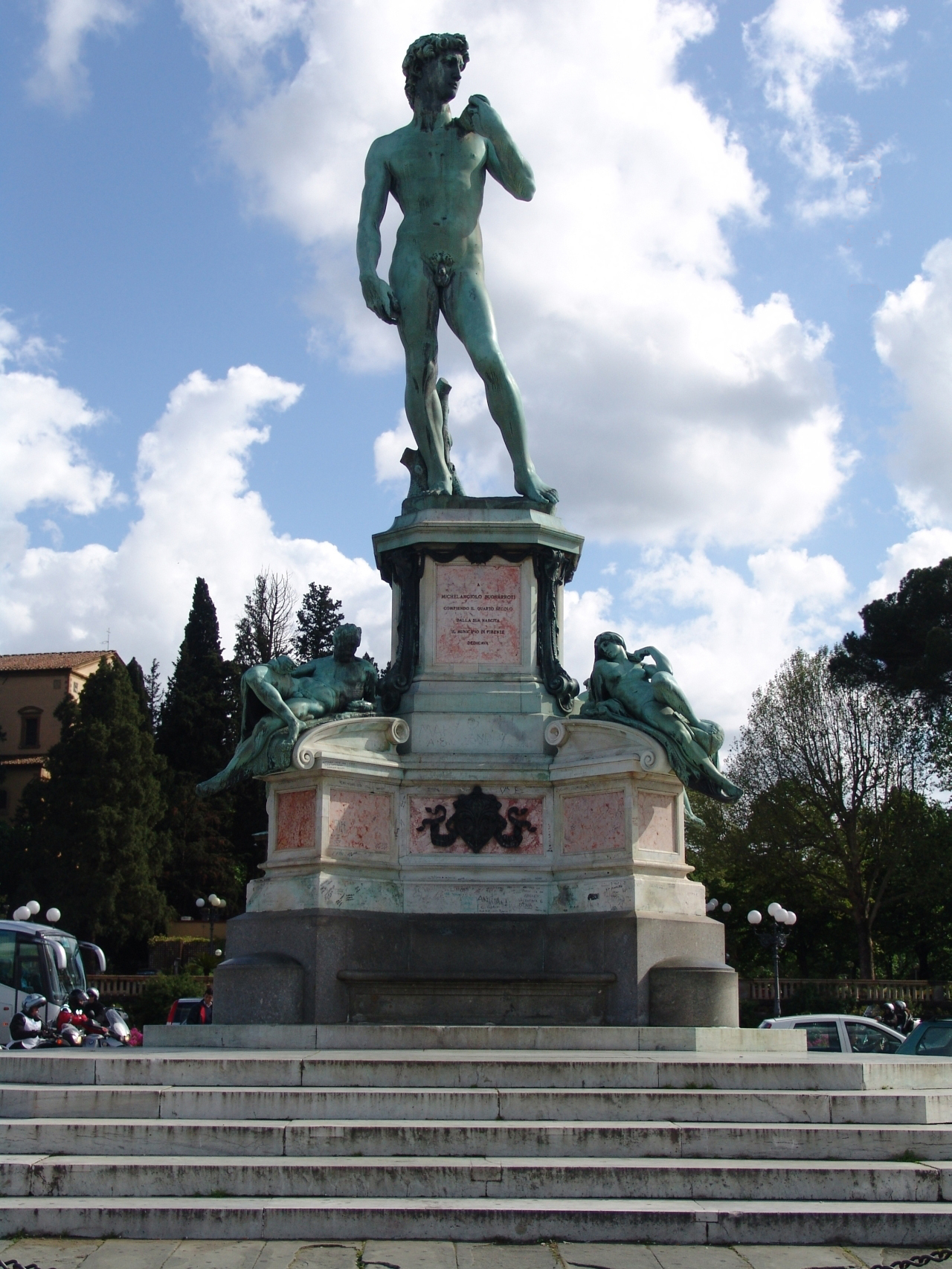
Bronze cast of David facing Florence from the center of the square

The square, dedicated to the Renaissance sculptor Michelangelo, has bronze copies of some of his marble works found elsewhere in Florence: the David and the four allegories of the times of day at the Medici Chapel of San Lorenzo.

Poggi designed the loggia in the neoclassical-style that dominates the terrace. Originally it was intended to house a museum of works by Michelangelo. In the wall of the balcony, under the loggia, an epigraph in capital letters refers to his work.

The view captures the heart of Florence from Forte Belvedere to Santa Croce, across the walkways and the bridges crossing the Arno, including the Ponte Vecchio, the Duomo, Palazzo Vecchio, the Bargello and the octagonal bell tower of the Badia Fiorentina.
