= Portrait of Francesco Giamberti =

Painting by Piero di Cosimo

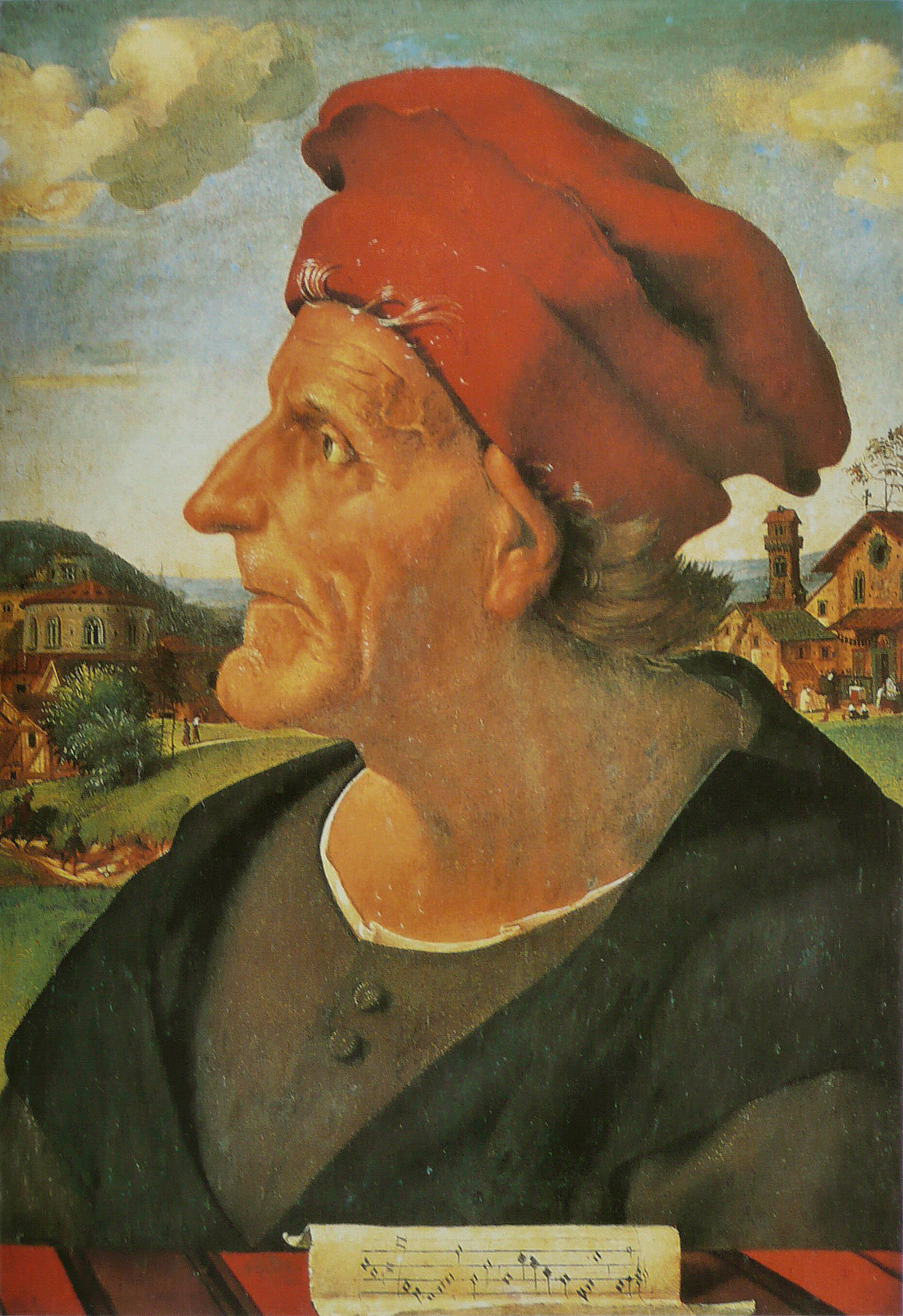
- Artist: Piero di Cosimo
- Year: c. 1485
- Medium: oil on panel
- Movement: Italian Renaissance
- Dimensions: 47.5 cm × 33.5 cm (18.7 in × 13.2 in)
- Location: Rijksmuseum, Amsterdam

Portrait of Francesco Giamberti is an oil on panel painting by Piero di Cosimo, executed c. 1485, now in the Rijksmuseum in Amsterdam. The background details show the influence of Hugo van der Goes.

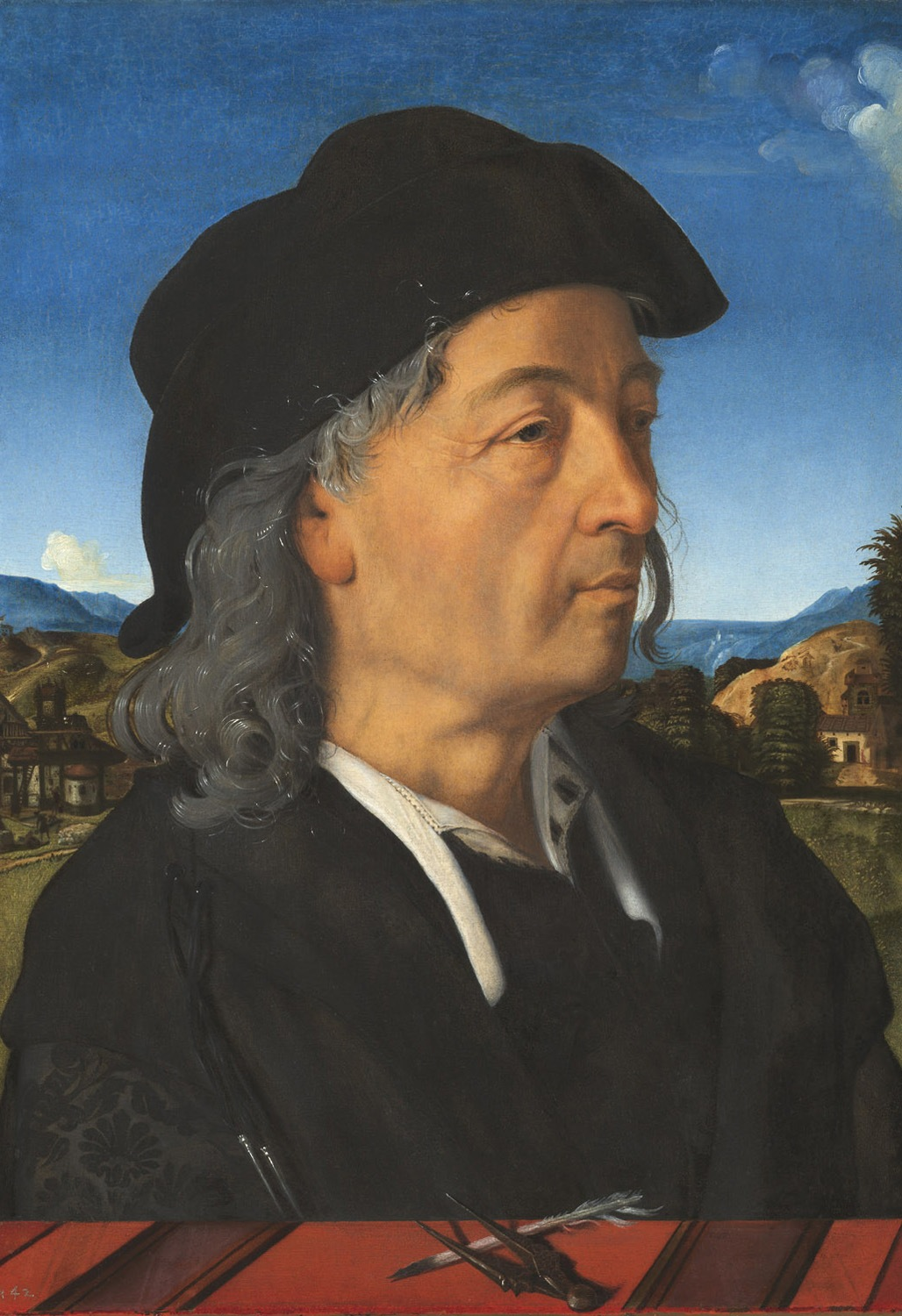
The pair portrait of Giuliano, also in the Rijksmuseum.

Its subject was a legnaioulo or furniture carver who worked for Cosimo the Elder and the Medici and also composed music for them, carving a musical score into the base of one of the pieces of furniture they commissioned from him. He probably also worked for the papacy. He also founded a major Tuscan family of architects and artists who assumed the name Sangallo, possibly after property they owned at the San Gallo gate of Florence - Giuliano da Sangallo and Antonio da Sangallo the Elder were his sons and Antonio da Sangallo the Younger, Bastiano da Sangallo and Francesco da Sangallo were his grandsons. It was Giuliano who commissioned Piero di Cosimo to produce a double portrait of himself and his father, probably using a death mask for the latter.

== Sources ==
- http://medicinaybellasartes.blogspot.com/
- (in Spanish) V. V. A. A. (2005). Museos del Mundo, Rijksmuseum, pág. 155. Planeta de Agostini. ISBN 84-674-2003-0.
