= Villa Pitiana =

Historic Estate

Villa Pitiana is a historic estate in the province of Florence in Italy.

== History ==
Villa Pitiana is situated at 430 Meters above sea level and its structure divides the last olive groves of Valdarno from the centuries-old trees of the Vallombrosa. On 3 July 1039 the Abbess Itta of the convent of Saint Ellero donated the land in Vallombrosa to S. Giovanni Gualberto but to maintain them had to add a farm with a vegetable garden and vines in Pitiana. Halfway through the 13th century Pitiana's strategic position made it a bone of contention in the florentine Guelp-Ghibelline struggles. The oldest part of the villa datating back to the 14th century is a "casa da signore", a fortified building with a high tower, used as refuge by villagers in times of war.

In the summer of 1483 Lorenzo il Magnifico de Medici tried to purchase the villa from military don Biagio Milanesi however it remained under military control due to its strategic location. From the 15th to the 17th centuries, Tuscan agriculture underwent one of its most difficult periods. Political power was now under the control of merchants and bankers and commercial activity was subsidised to the detriment of farming.

Pitiana underwent a vast restoration in the Renaissance period: in 1610, as shown by a large engraving at the entrance of the castle, the rear wing was added with its three floor façade. From the same period is the late-Mannerist coat-of-arms with the staff of S. Giovanni Gualberto and the mitre, the symbol of the bishopric dignity of the abbot of Vallombroda, in the larger courtyard of Pitiana.

In 1808 when Tuscany was annexed to Napoleon's empire the Abbey of Vallombrosa was suppressed and all its possessions including Pitiana were alienated to private owners to replenish the state coffers- except the forest which remained state owned. The Church however managed to regain ownership of Pitiana for a brief period. Eventually, Villa Pitiana passed into the possession of the Grottanelli family. At the end of the 19th century the Pitiana farm was transformed into a villa, yet maintaining farming activities in some parts of the estate.

== Architecture ==
Pitiana facade is a neo-Renaissance architecture as part of Giuseppe Poggi's work in Florence during the late 19th century, with major renovation work undergone between 1897 and 1931.

== Today ==
Villa Pitiana was privatised by the estate into a modern day hotel.
