= Palazzo Gerini =

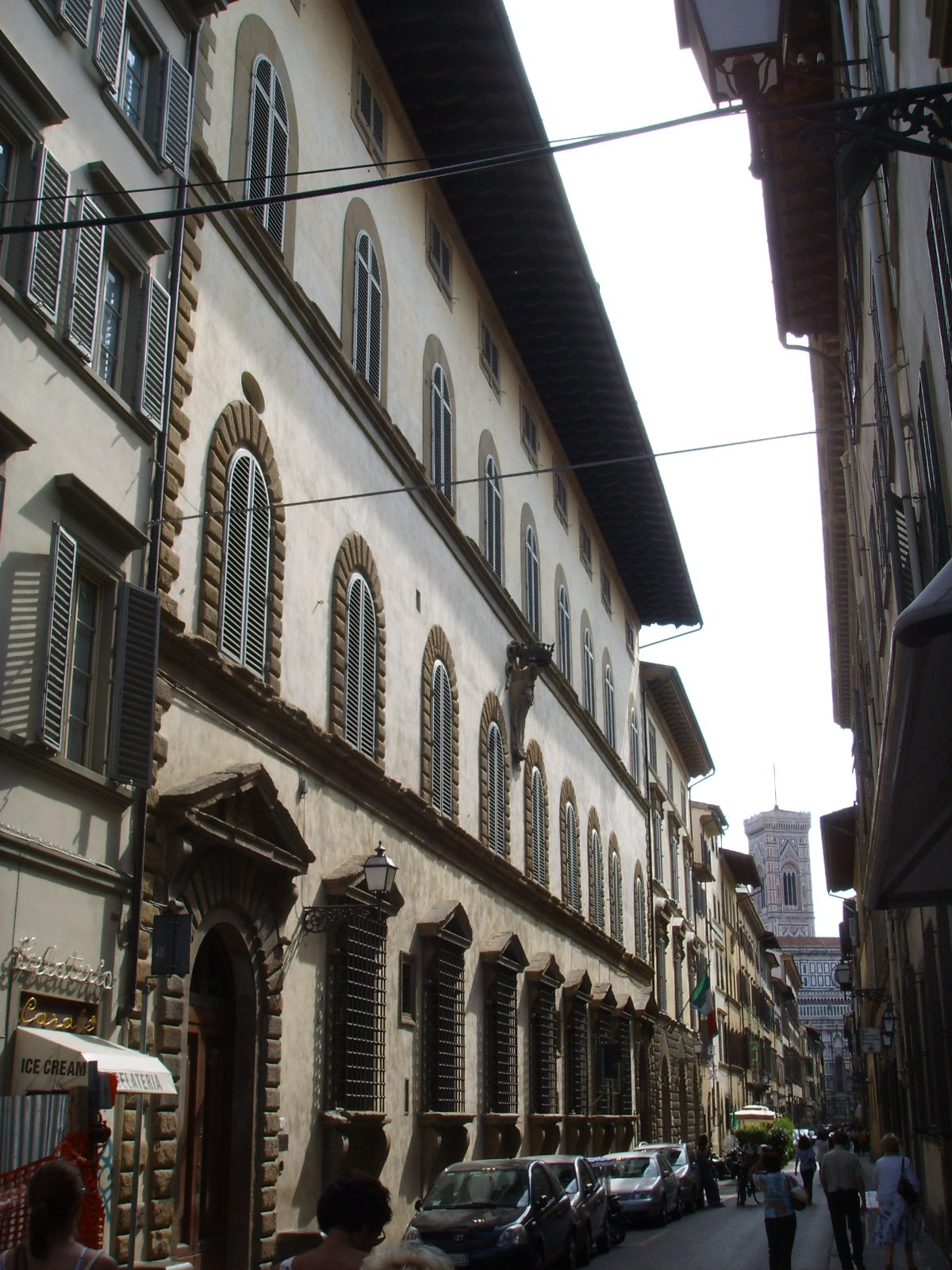
Palazzo Gerini facade

The Palazzo Gerini is a Renaissance-style palace located on via Ricasoli 42 in Florence, Italy.

== History and description ==
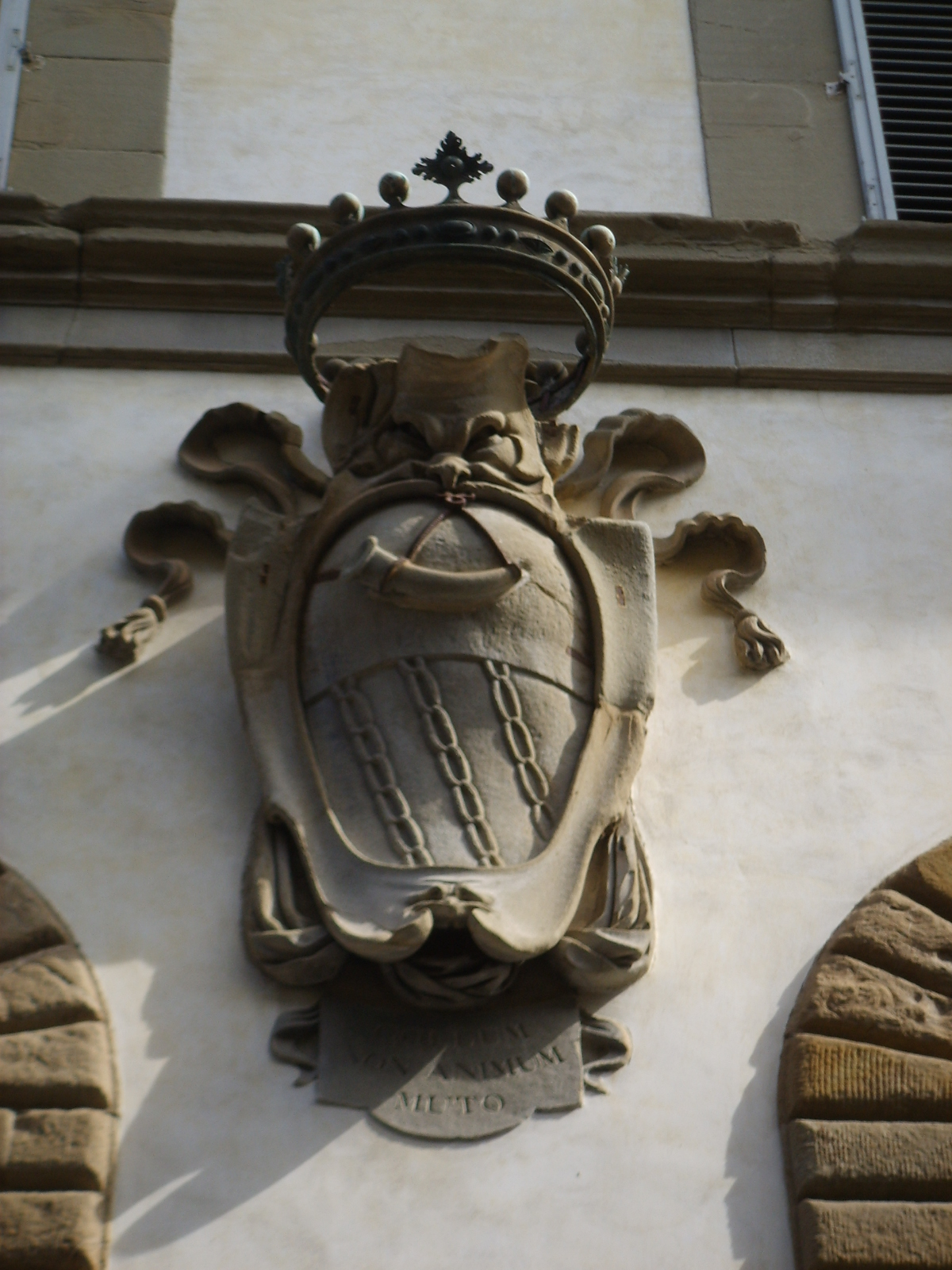
Heraldic Coat of Arms of Gerini family

Via Ricasoli was previously called Via del Cocomero. At the site of this palace in the 15th-century were two houses owned by the Ginori family, who sold it to Piero da Gagliano, who then sold it to the Salviati family in 1579. The Salviati engaged the architect Bernardo Buontalenti to help restructure the site.

However, in 1650, the Gerini family, under the newly minted Marchese Carlo Gerini, secretary of the cardinal Carlo de' Medici purchased the palace and refurbished the interiors, commissioning frescoes from Anton Domenico Gabbiani and Jacopo Chiavistelli. In 1752, the main entrance and stairwell was refurbished under the designs of Gaspare Maria Paoletti. In 1798, the family had bought the adjacent palace at #40, and at the turn of the 19th century, Giuseppe Poggi, remodeled it to resemble the other facade. This refurbishment damaged many of the frescoes on the piano nobile. Until 1825, the palace held a highly prestigious collections of paintings, including works by or attributed to Piero di Cosimo, Domenico Ghirlandaio, Andrea del Sarto, Carlo Dolci, and Rembrandt.

== Bibliography ==
- Marcello Vannucci, Splendidi palazzi di Firenze, Le Lettere, Firenze 1995.
