= Piazza Cesare Beccaria =

Square in Florence, Italy

Piazza Beccaria
- Public square
- {{{other_names}}}
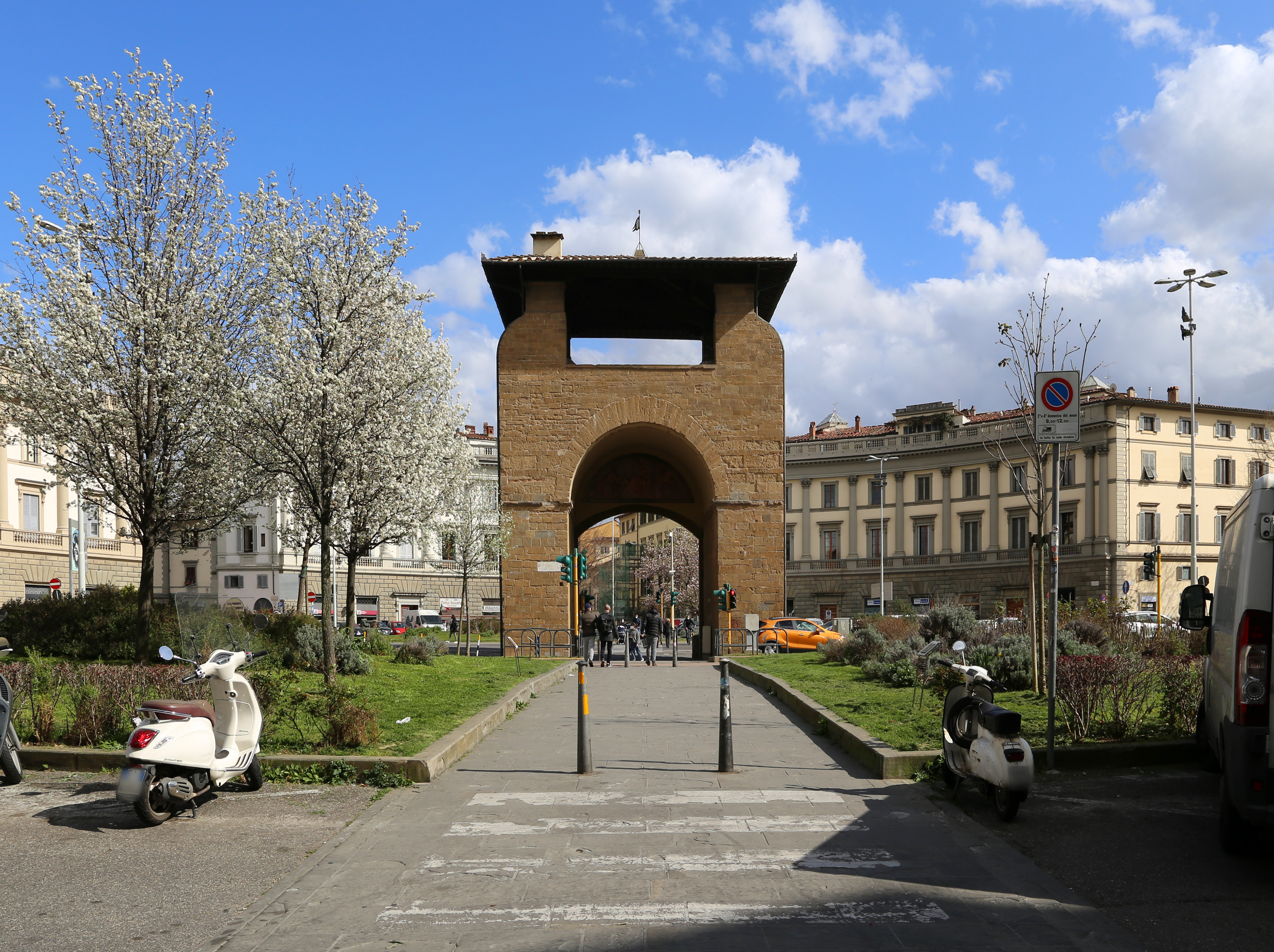
- Porta alla Croce in Piazza Beccaria
- Features: Porta alla Croce
- Design: Giuseppe Poggi
- Opened: 1865
- Amenities: underground parking garage
- Surface: grass, stone
- Dedicated to: Cesare Bonesana
- Location: viali di Circonvallazione; Florence, Italy
- Interactive map of Piazza Beccaria
- Coordinates: 43°46′14.82″N 11°16′14.64″E

Piazza Cesare Beccaria is a square of Florence located on the viali di Circonvallazione, the boulevard along the route of the former walls of Florence.

== History ==
The piazza was designed by the architect Giuseppe Poggi when Florence became briefly the Capital of Kingdom of Italy; in 1876, it was named in honour of Cesare Bonesana marchese di Beccaria.

This place originally was called Piazza alla Croce due to the Porta alla Croce, still present, the former gate of the medieval walls. A number of concave neoclassical palaces were built around the square.

On the square, at the bifurcation of the Viale Giovine Italia and Viale Amendola, there is the building of the State Archives of Florence, where until 1977 stood the GIL building.

In 2003–2004, a three-story underground parking garage was built under the square.

== Gallery ==
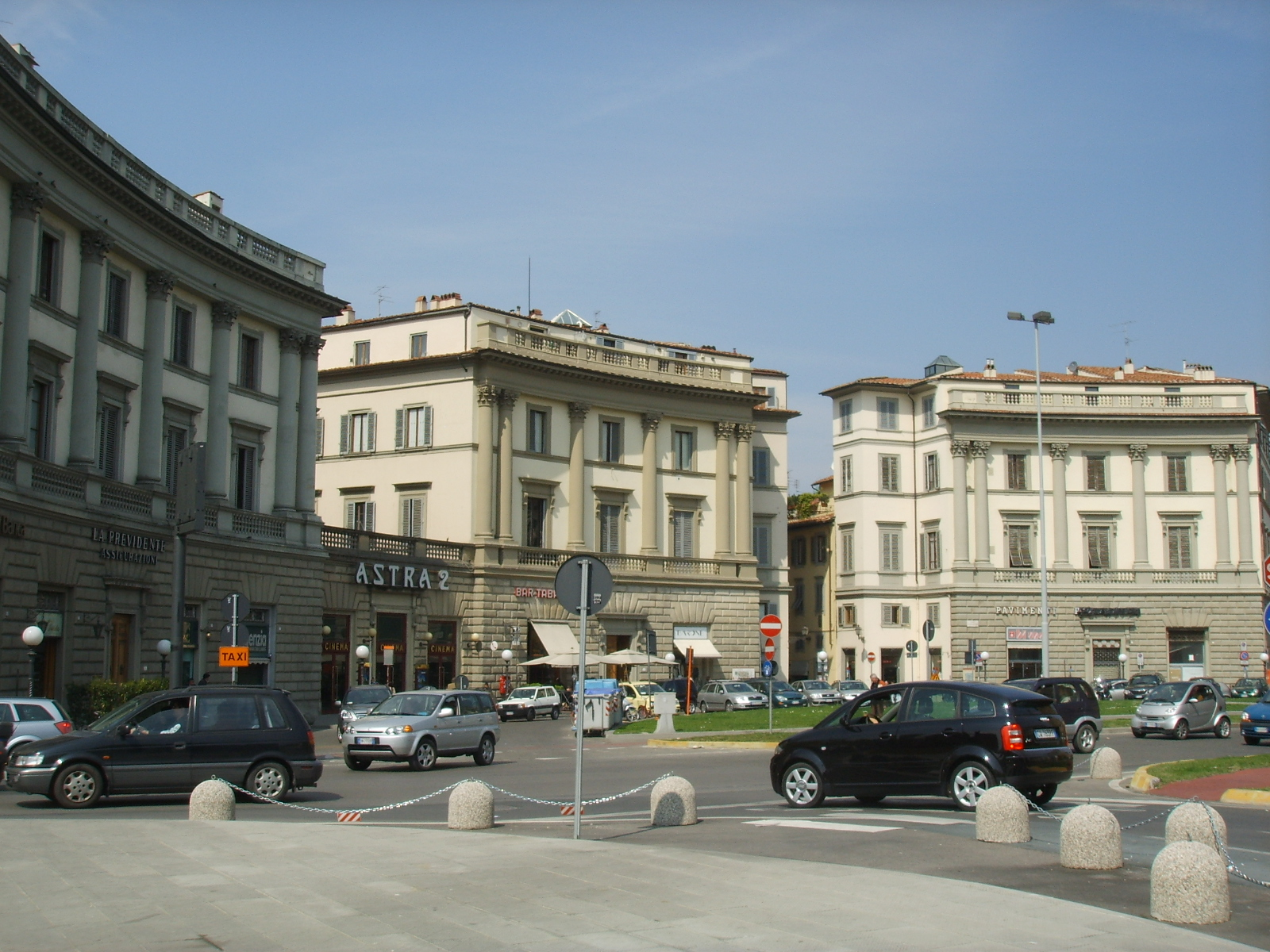
Buildings

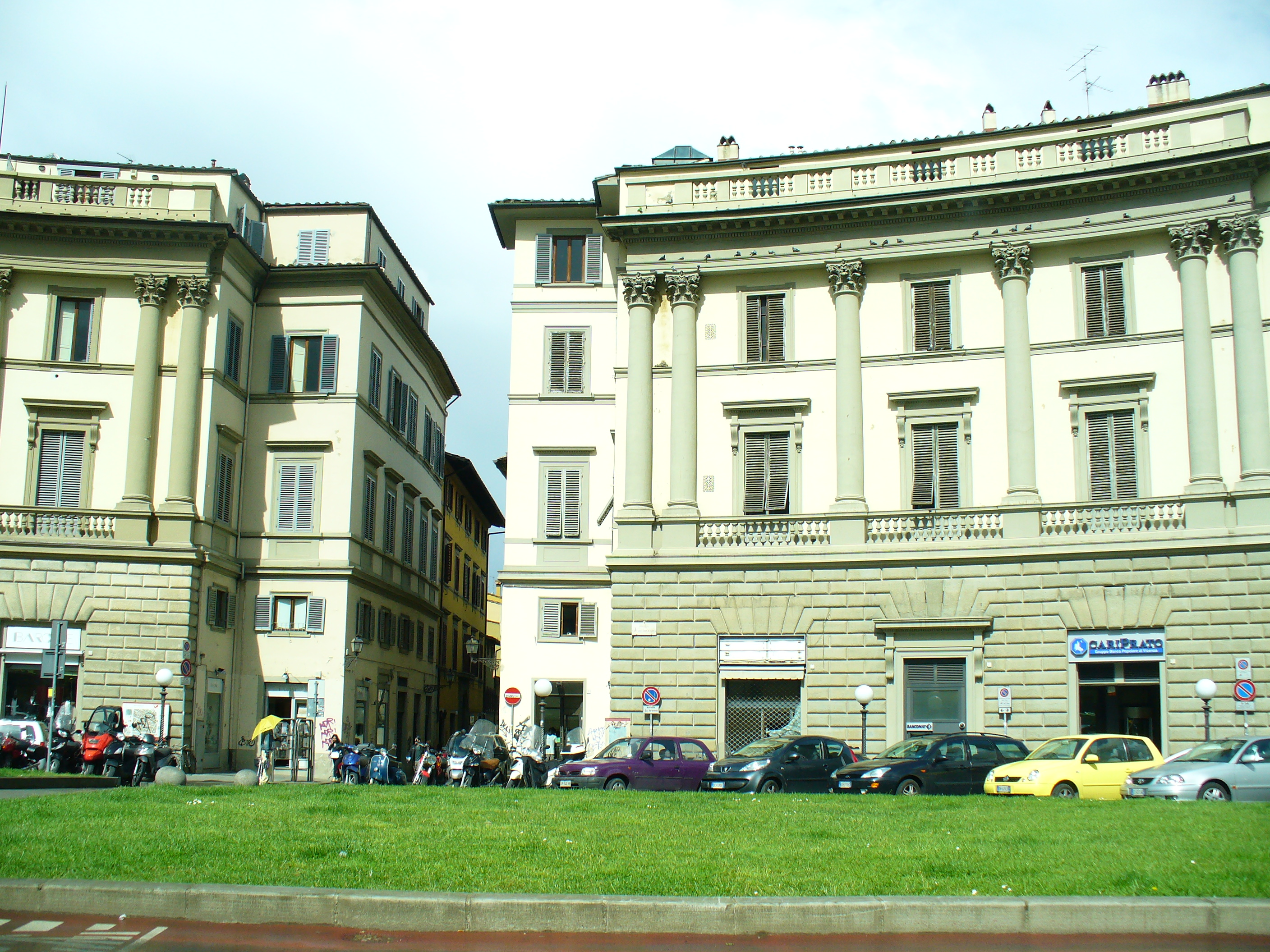
Buildings

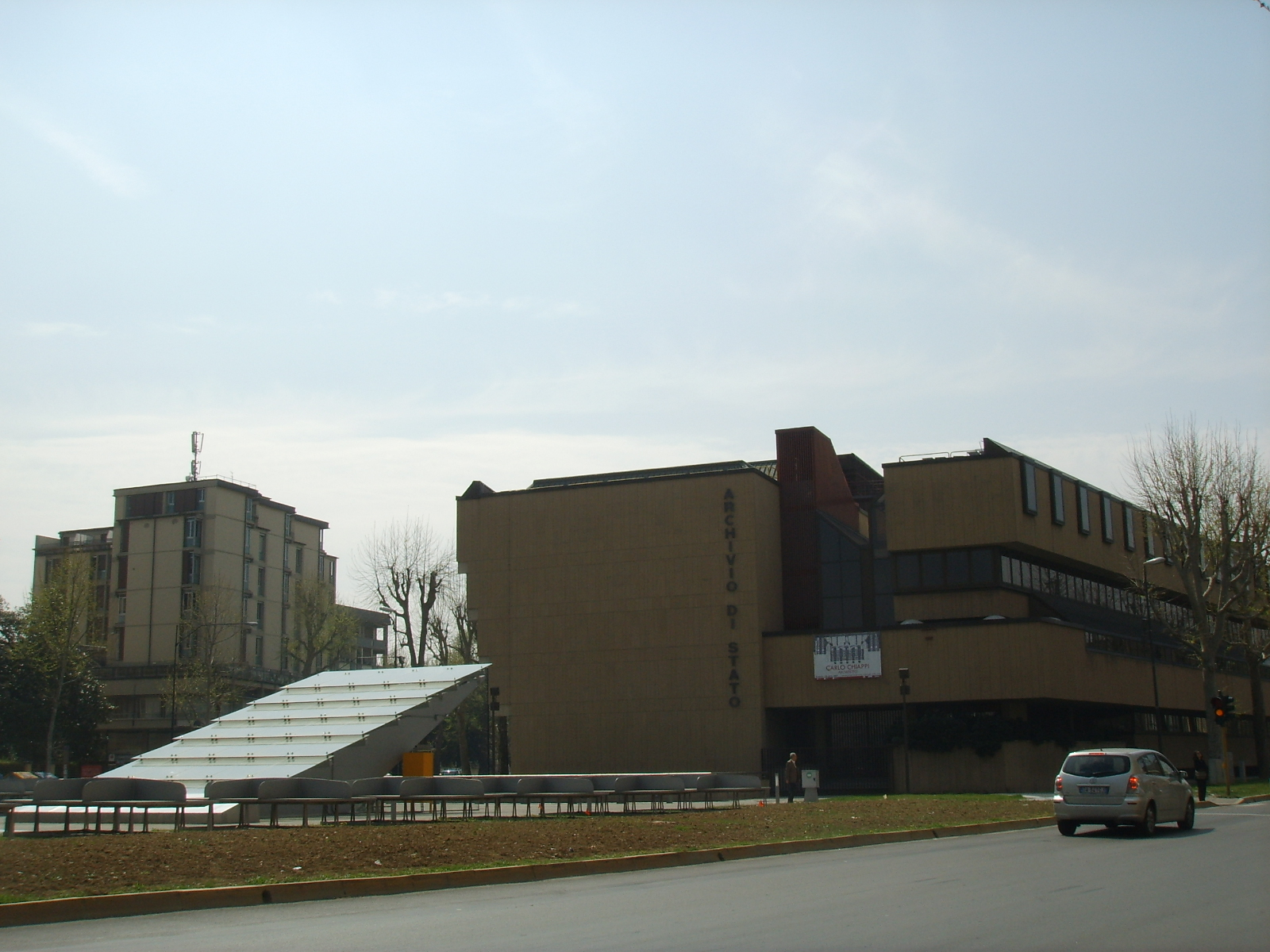
State Archives

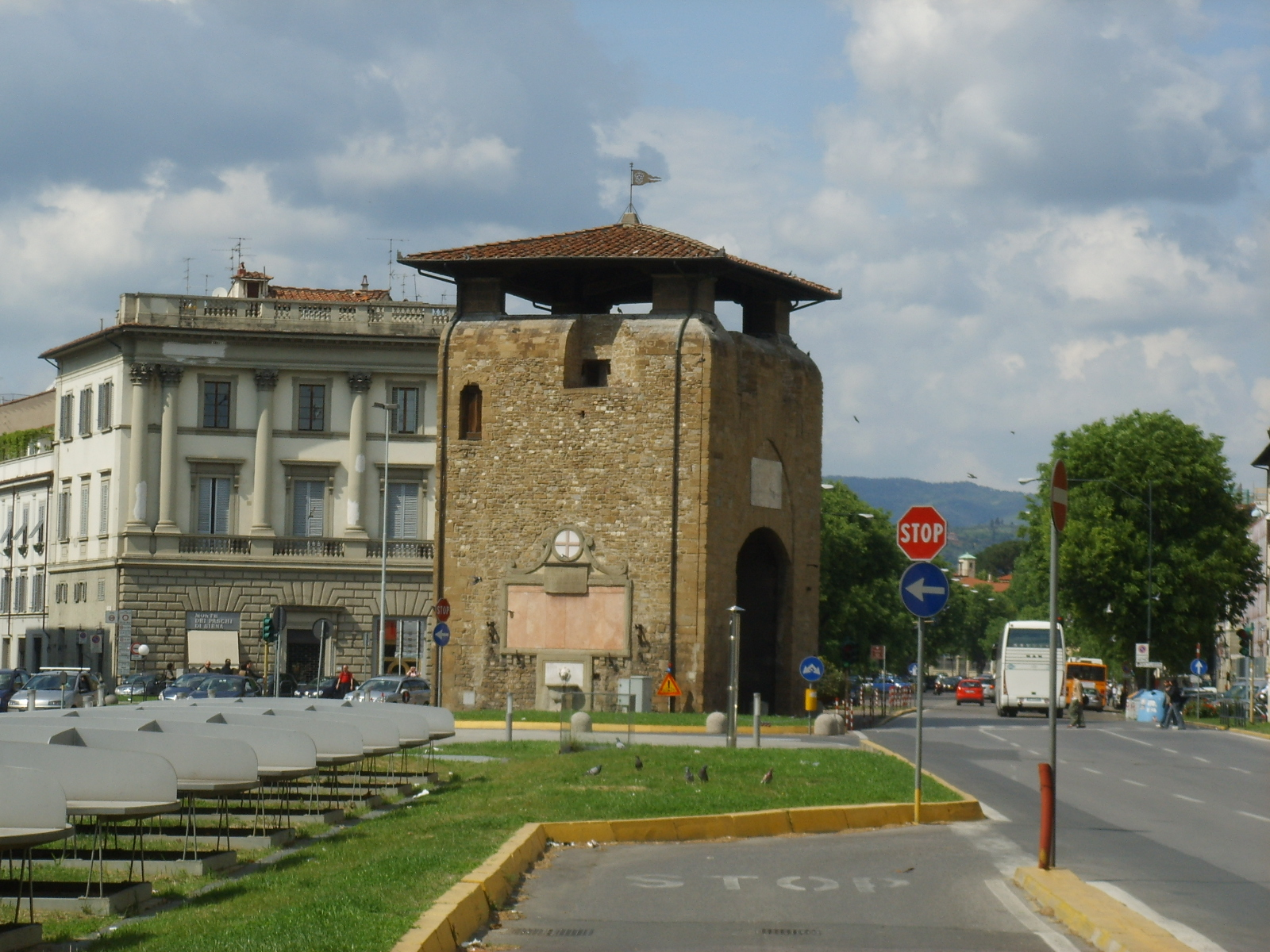
Porta alla Croce
