= Viali di Circonvallazione =

Boulevards in Florence, Italy

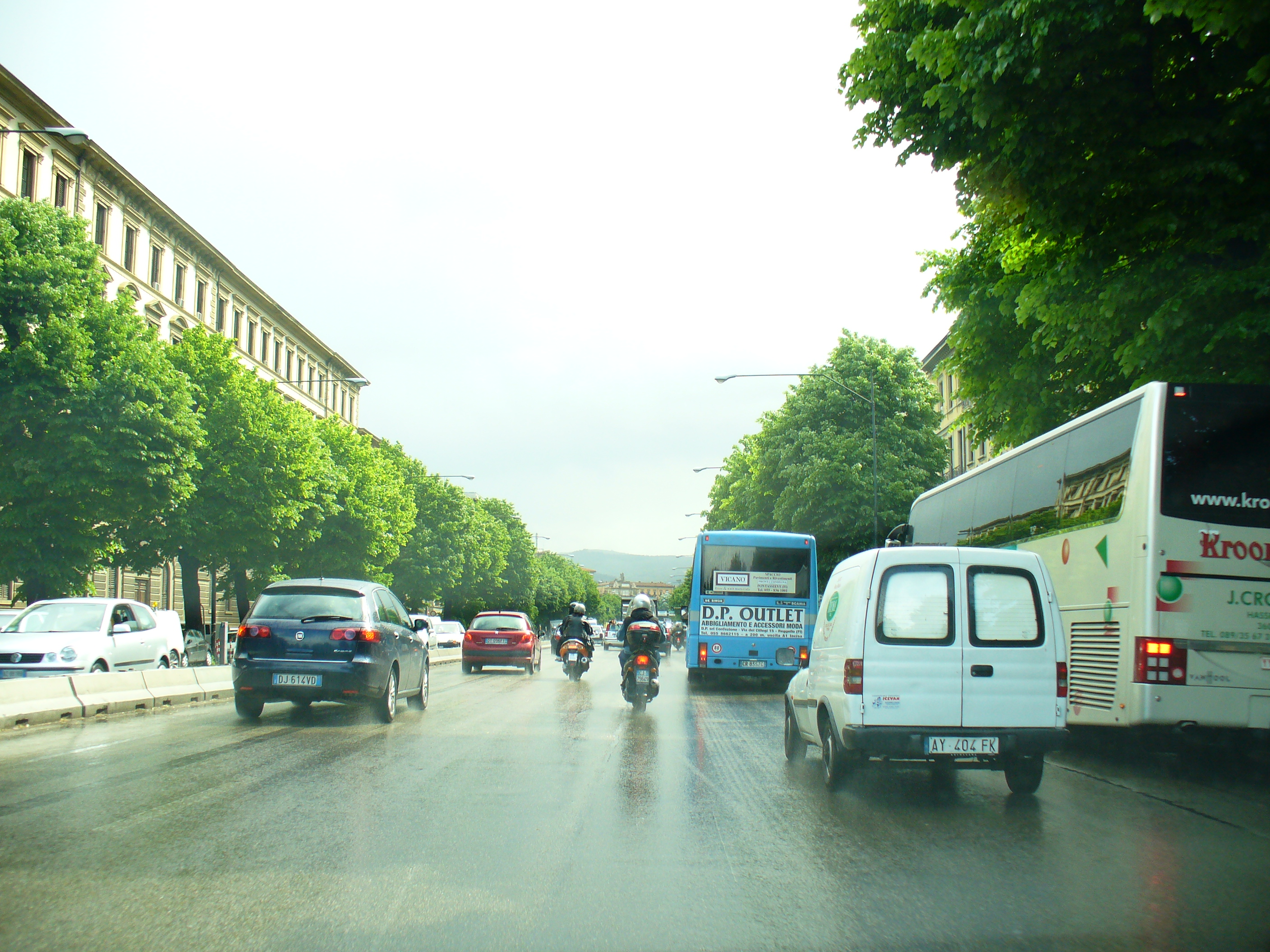
The Boulevards

The Viali di Circonvallazione are a series of 6-lane boulevards surrounding the north part of the historic centre of Florence.

== History ==
The boulevards follow the outline of the ancient walls of Florence, that were demolished in 1865 according to Giuseppe Poggi's project to make Florence, then the capital of Italy, a modern city with wide boulevards inspired by those of Paris. Around the former gates of the city, squares and palaces were created. This overall project was called the Risanamento of Florence, similar to what Baron Haussmann did to Paris.

== Today ==
Today the viali di Circonvallazione are the main arterial street of Florence for the traffic from west to east.

The route (from west) starting from Ponte alla Vittoria bridge is:

- Viale Fratelli Rosselli (with Torre della Serpe and Leopolda Station)
- Piazzale of Porta al Prato
- Viale Filippo Strozzi (around the Fortezza da Basso)
- Viale Spartaco Lavagnini
- Piazza della Libertà (with Porta San Gallo, Triumphal Arch of the Lorraine and the Parterre)
- Viale Giacomo Matteotti
- Piazzale Donatello (around the English Cemetery)
- Viale Antonio Gramsci
- Piazza Beccaria (with Porta alla Croce, Archive of State and La Nazione headquarters)
- From here the boulevards divide into:
  - Viale Giovine Italia (with the Torre della Zecca and Arno River)
  - Viale Giovanni Amendola

== Gallery ==
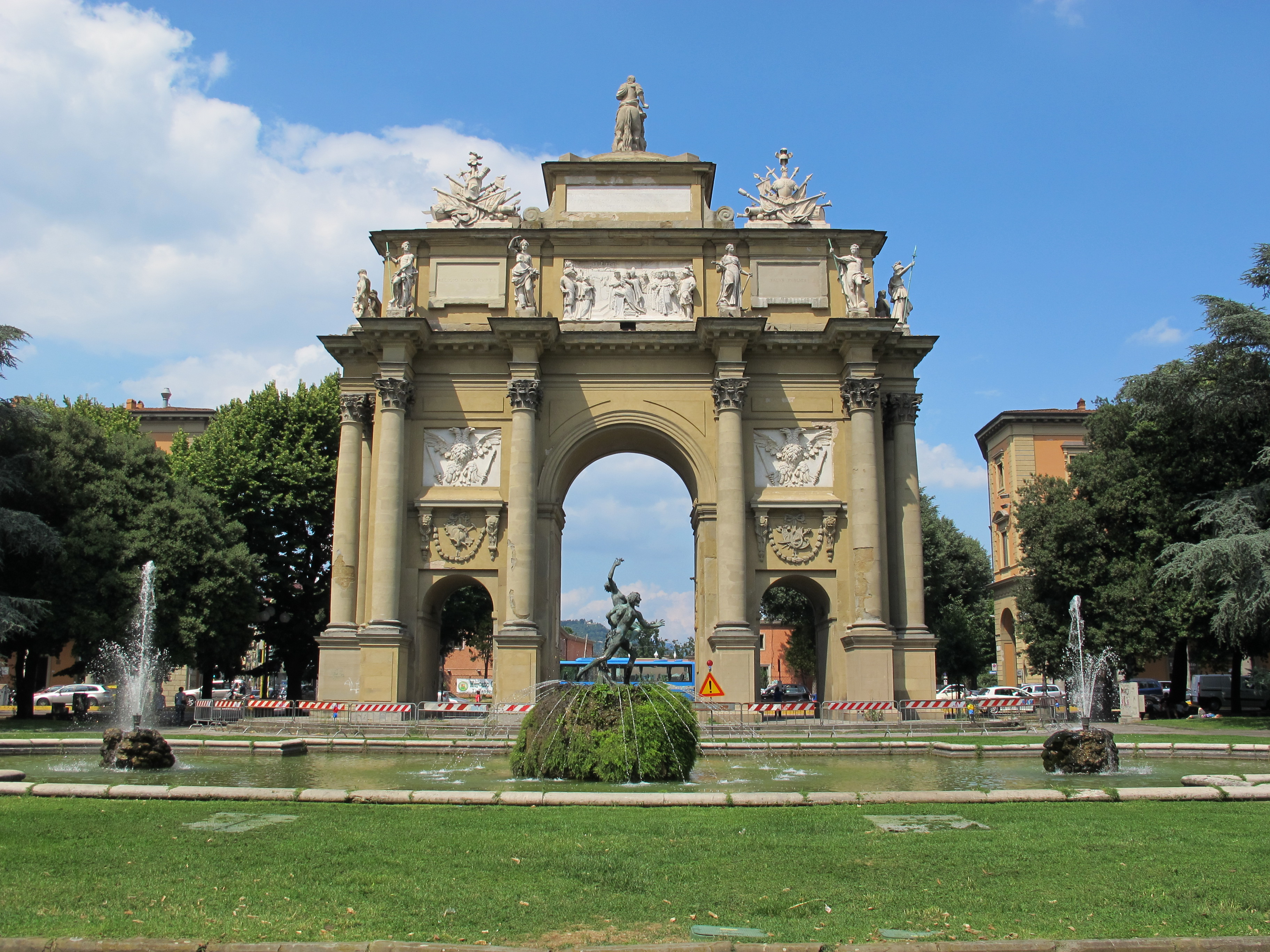
Piazza della Libertà

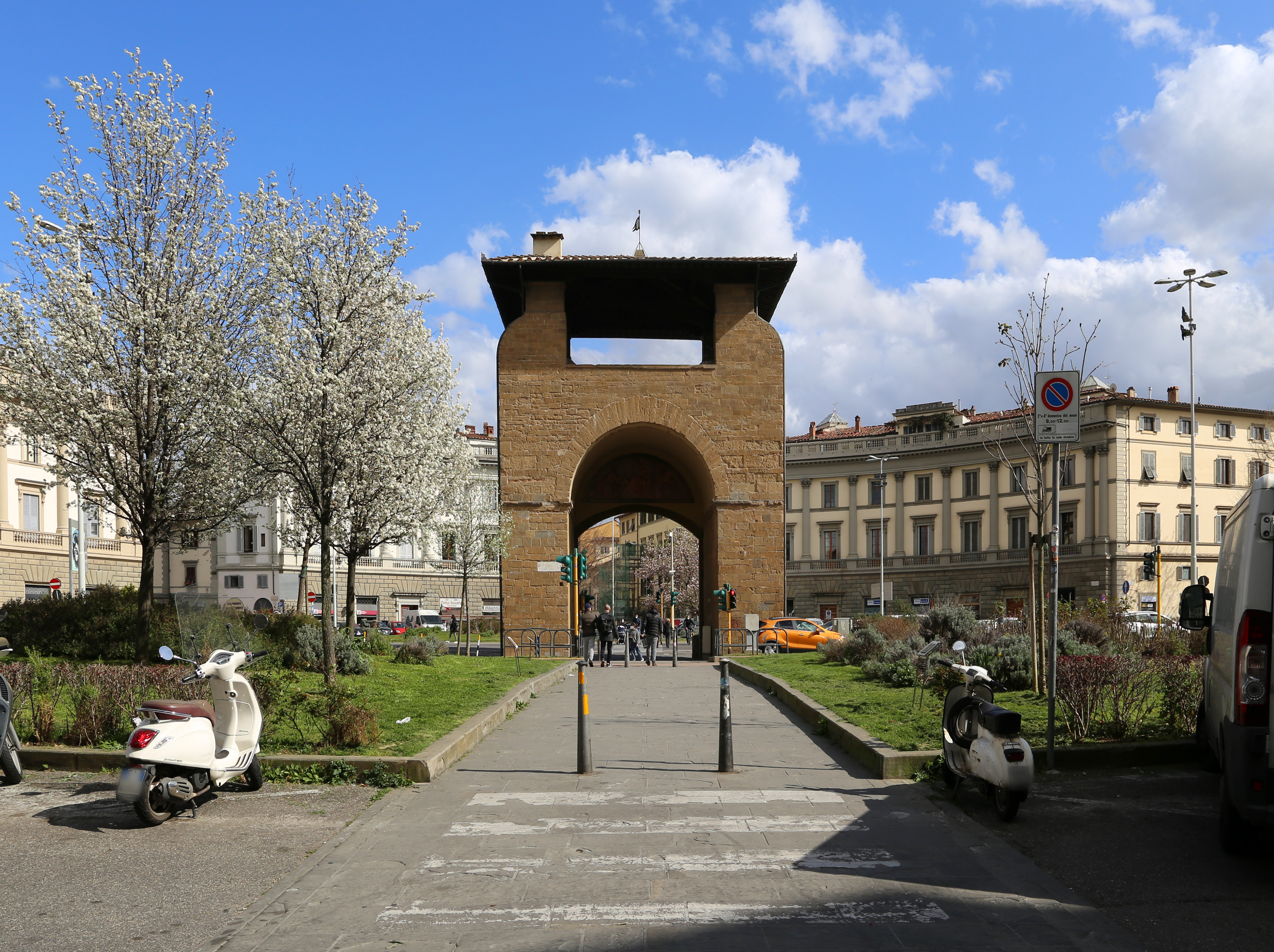
Piazza Beccaria

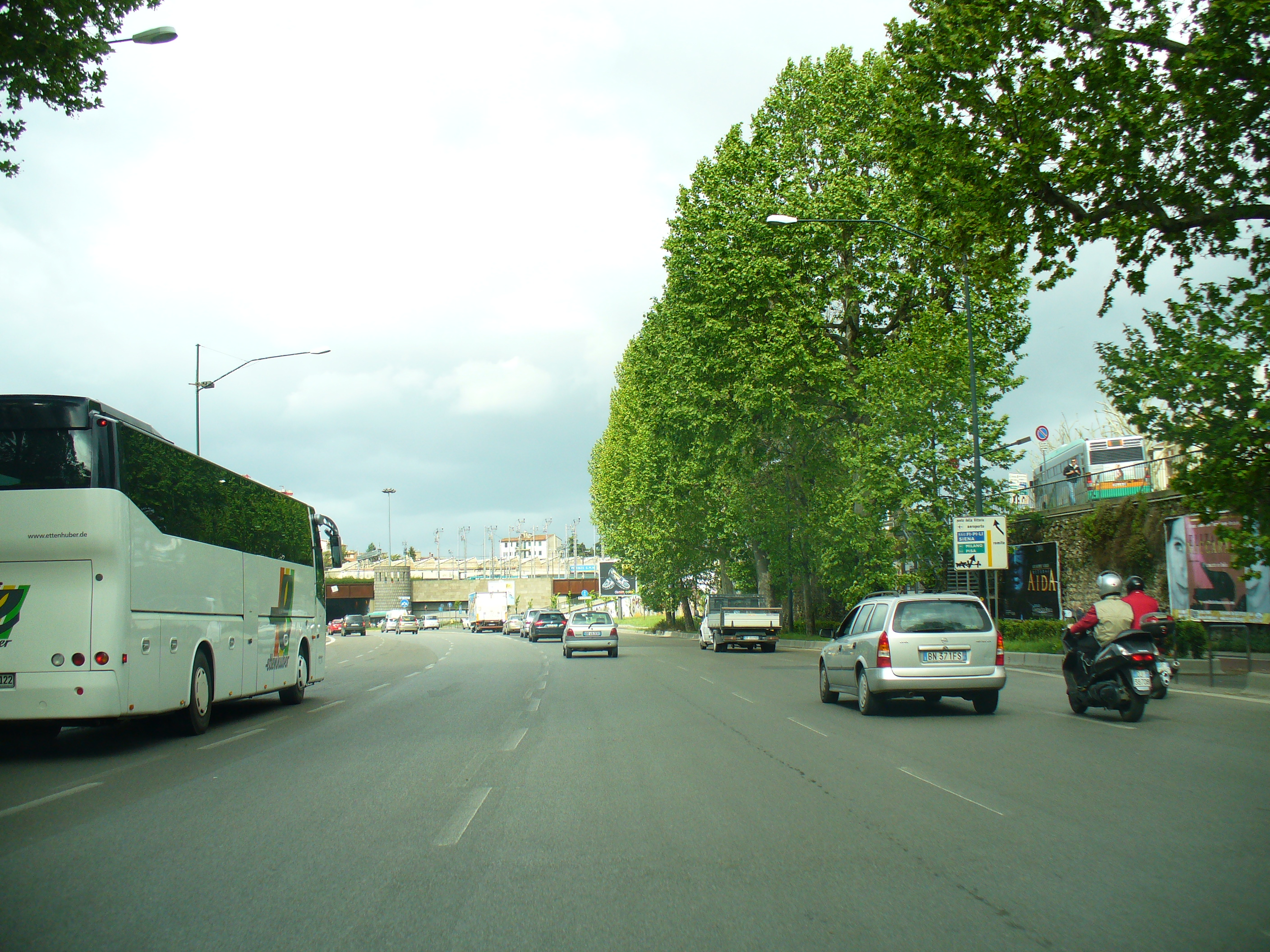
Viale Strozzi

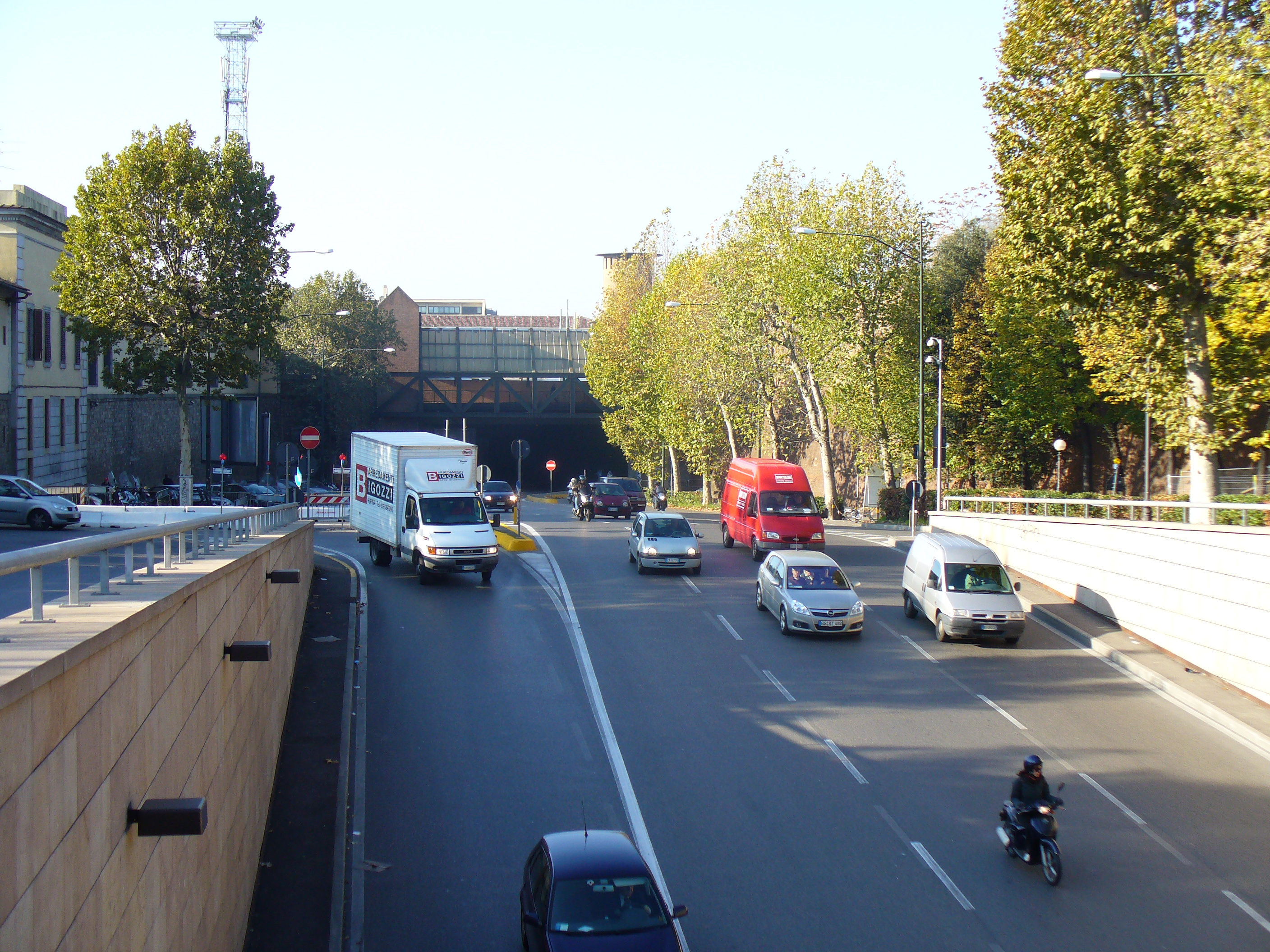
Viale Strozzi

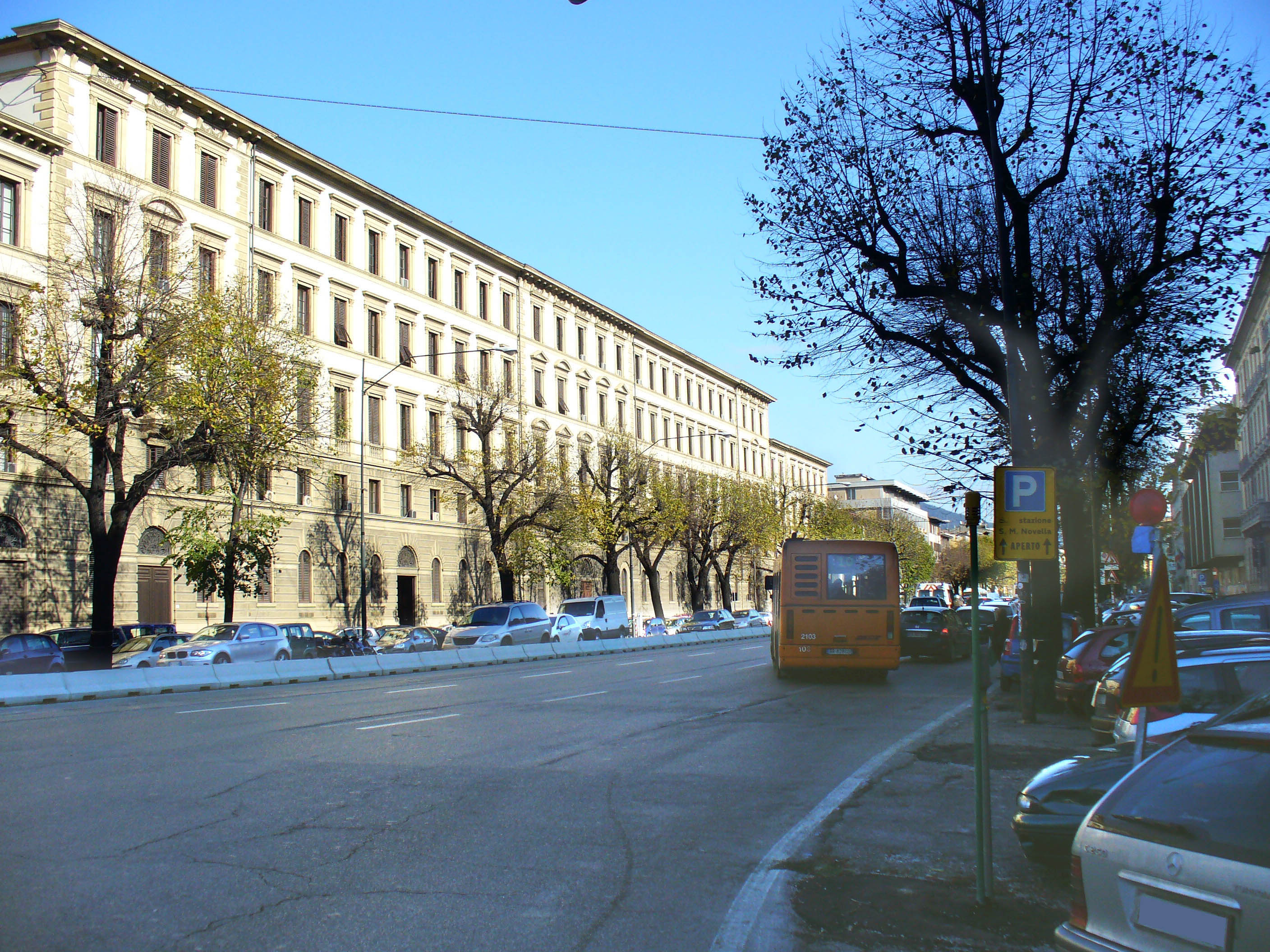
Viale Spartaco Lavagnini

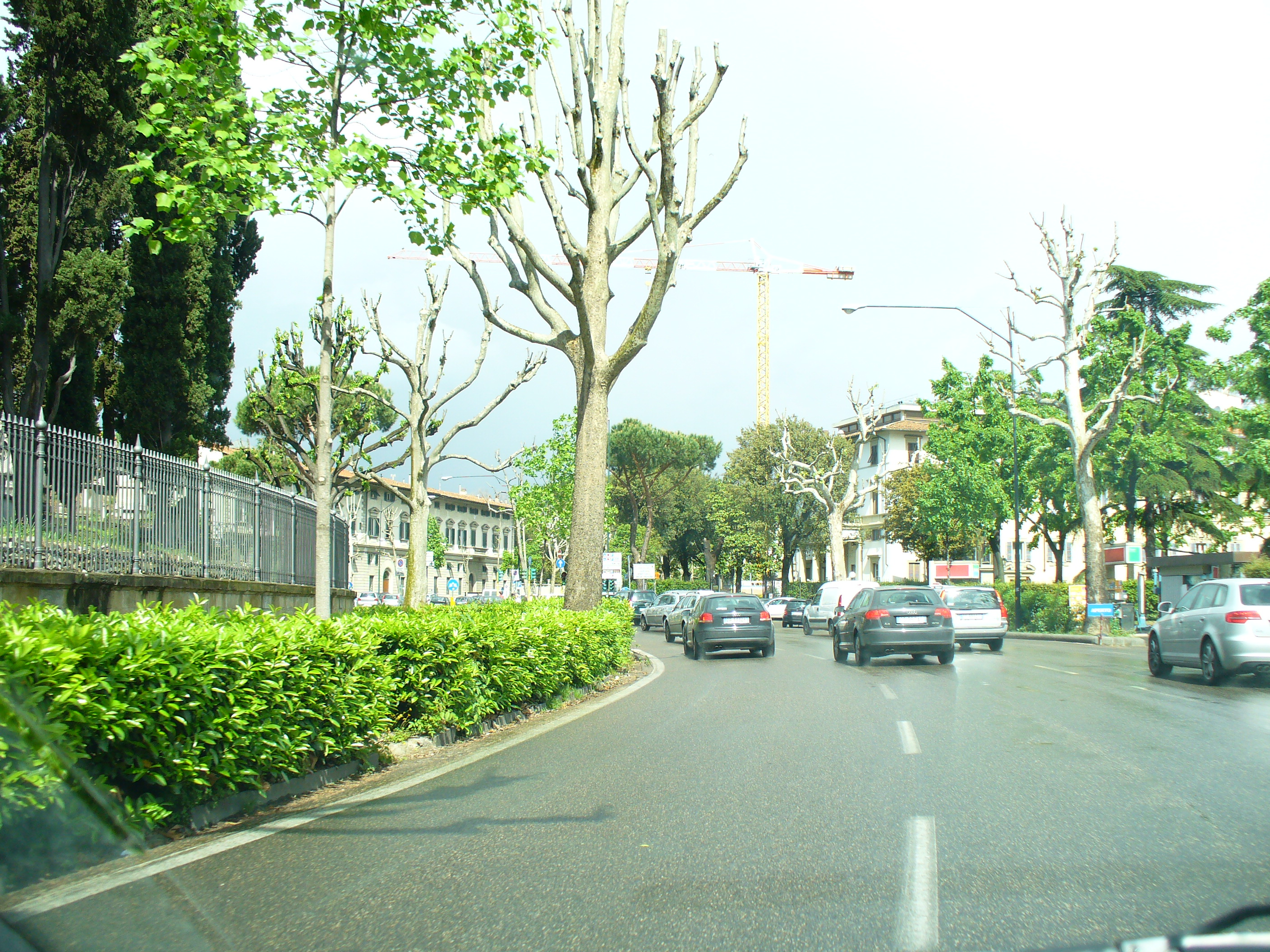
Piazzale Donatello
