= Via Camillo Cavour =

Street in Florence, Italy

Coordinates: 43°46′33.68″N 11°15′24.74″E

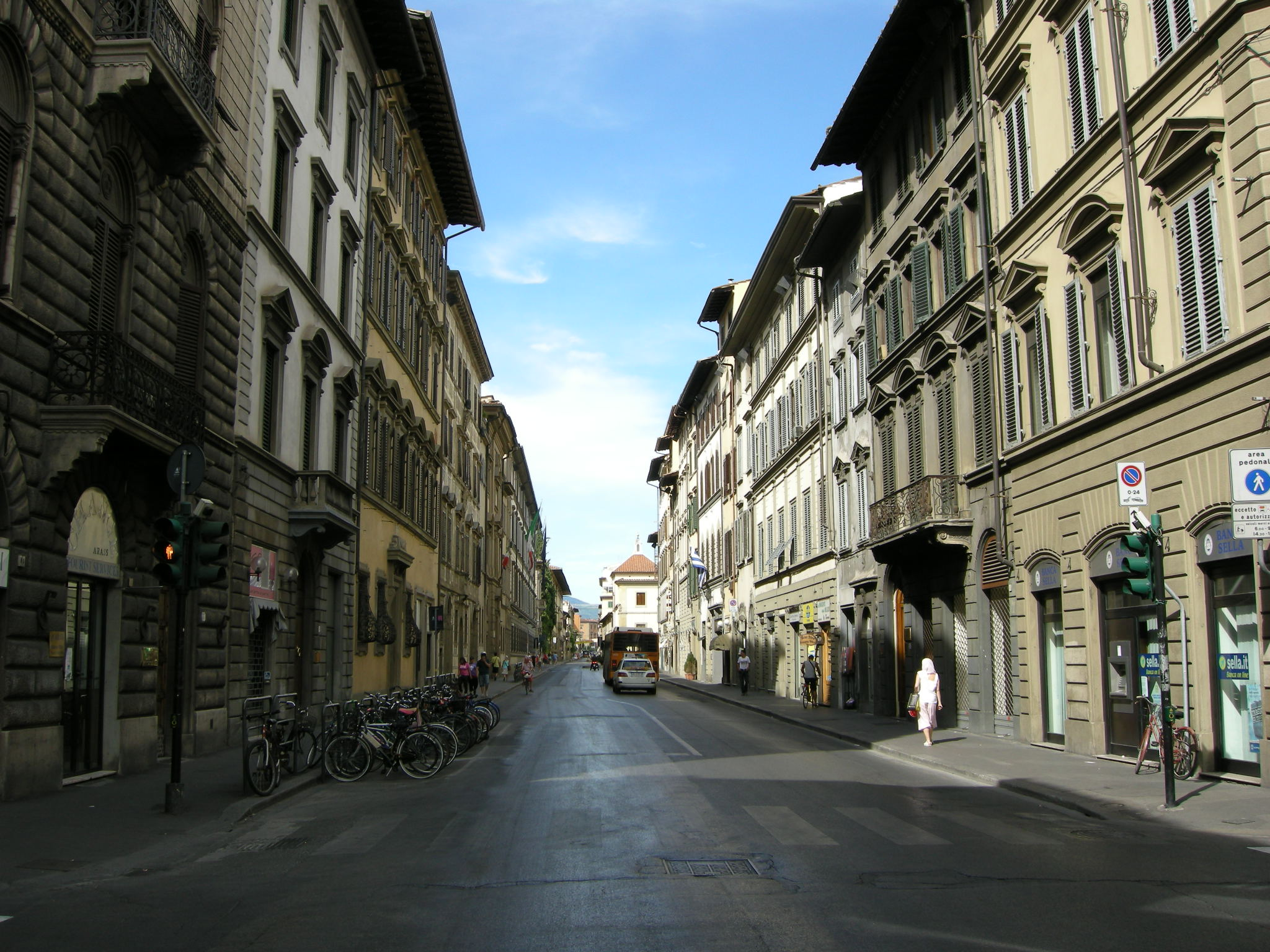
Via Cavour (Florence)

Via Camillo Cavour is one of the main roads of the northern area of the historic city centre of the Italian city of Florence. It was created in 1861 from two older streets, Via Larga and Via Leopoldo (as far as Piazza della Libertà, renamed Piazzale Cavour at the same time), and renamed after Camillo Cavour on 17 June 1861, just 11 days after his death.

== Bibliography ==
- Francesco Cesati, La grande guida delle strade di Firenze, Newton Compton Editori, Roma 2003.
