= Porta alla Croce, Florence =

Coordinates: 43°46′14.82″N 11°16′14.64″E

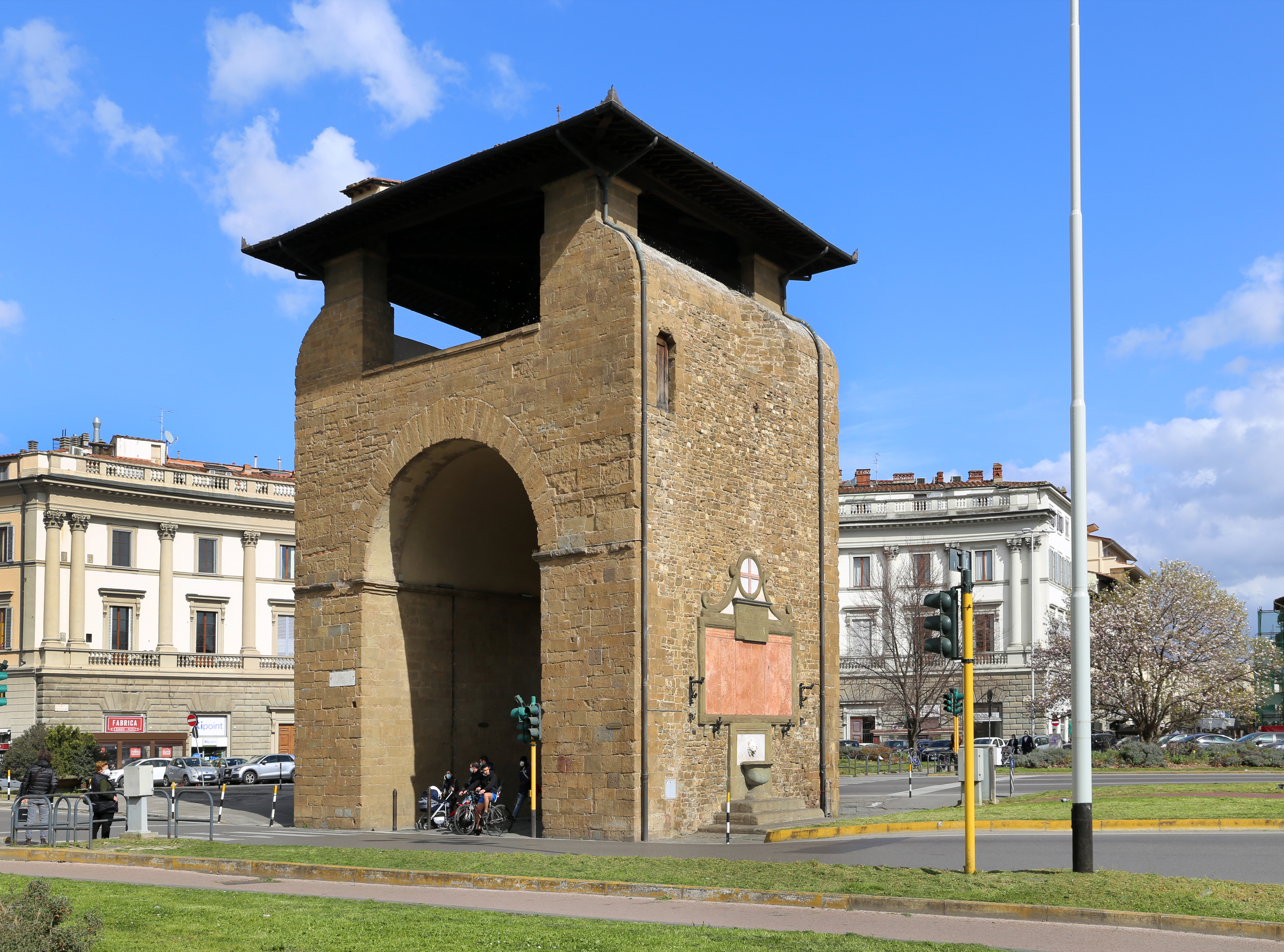
Porta with plaque for Fallen on right

The Porta alla Croce is a former gate of the Walls of Florence, locate east of the neighborhood of Santa Croce, in the Piazza Beccaria of Florence, region of Tuscany, Italy. The gate was part of the fourth set of walls around Florence built in the late 13th century.

The Gate was once called Porta alla Croce al gorgo and also Porta Sant'Ambrogio. It is said that the name may derive from the legend that at this location San Miniato was made a martyr.

The Gate was refurbished in 1817-1818 under the reign of Grand Duke Ferdinando III of Lorraine, and in the outer lunette has a much degraded fresco depicting the Virgin and Saints by Michele Tosini. In the past, just outside this gate, was the site where official executions were performed.

The urban renewal of Florence (1865-1871) directed by Giuseppe Poggi demolished the walls and left this and other gates isolated in a traffic circles.

To the south of the gate is a plaque commemorating those fallen in World War I. Below is a fountain in poor state of conservation. The memorial was dedicated in 1925, completed in 1928, and two Fascist emblems were once present. The plaque reads Fallen in the War of Vindication and for the Grandeur of Italy. A plaque from 1310 describes the size of the walls and gate in Braccia Florentina. Finally a third plaque states that in 1817, "Ferdinand III, Grand Duke of Tuscany, father of the citizens... to ensure a gain of wealthy classes in periods of poor harvests and boost trade, he opened with great commitment of spending, new ways by which to connect a carriage road from here to the upper valley of the Arno, Casentino and Romagna and because at the same time he restored this door and made more elegant and functional, demolishing blighted buildings that were pushed together and equalizing the level entry and exit. Florence's optimal and munificent prince."
