= San Gallo Gate =

Part of the city walls of Florence, Italy

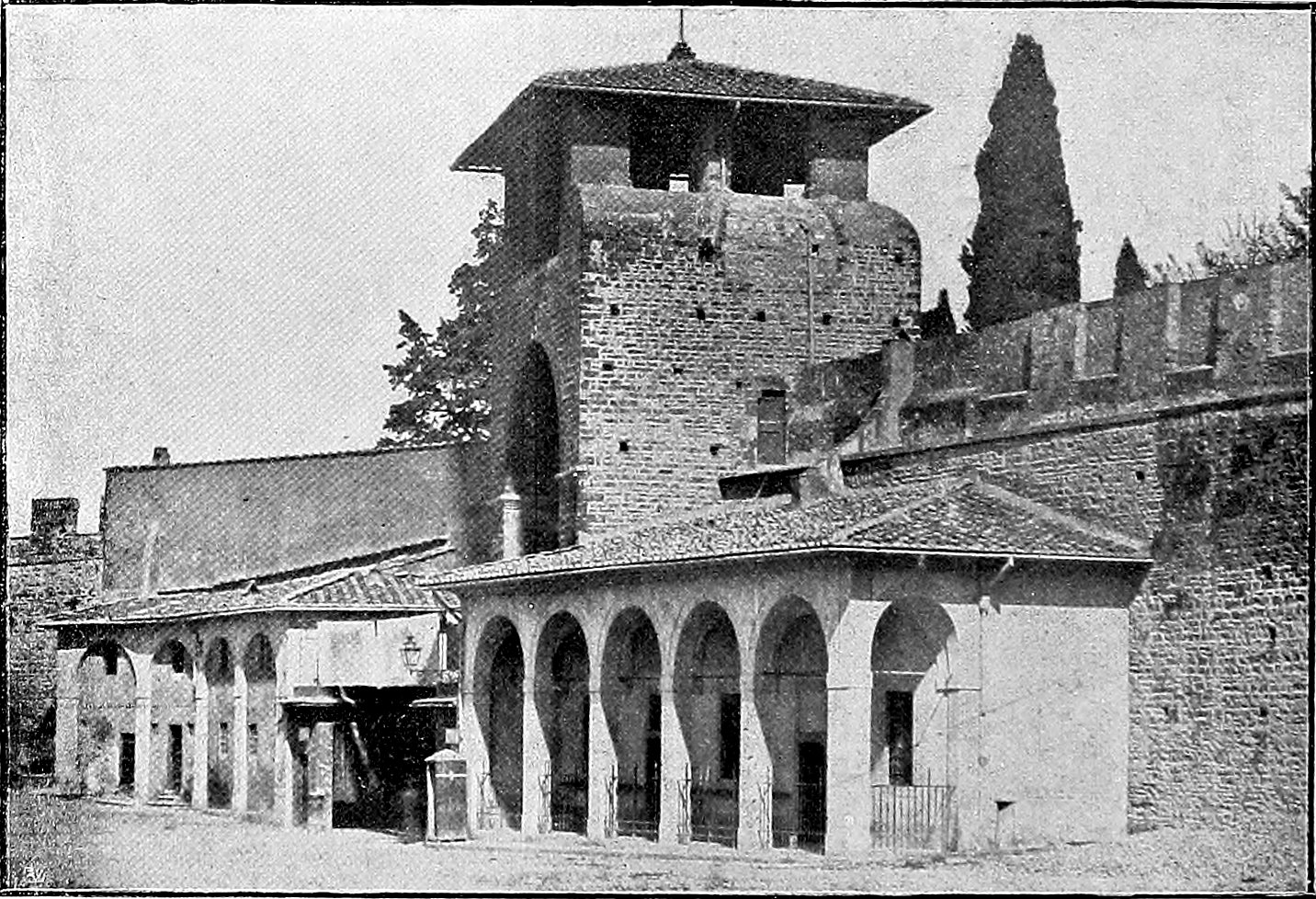
- Illustration from Corrado Ricci, Cento vedute di Firenze antica, Florence, Fratelli Alinari, 1906.
- Interactive map of San Gallo Gate
- Former name: Porta San Gallo
- Location: Florence, Italy
- Coordinates: 43°47′01″N 11°15′42″E
- North: Via Madonna della Tosse
- South: Via San Gallo

Construction
- Completion: 1327

Other
- Designer: Arnolfo di Cambio

The San Gallo Gate (Italian: Porta San Gallo) is part of the city walls of Florence and is located in Piazza della Libertà, opposite the Triumphal Arch.

== History ==
The San Gallo Gate was begun according to the plans of Arnolfo di Cambio in 1284, but was not completed until 1327. In the 13th century, it was one of the most heavily trafficked gates in the city, as it was the most northerly, connected to the road to Bologna. On the gate, whose keys are still kept in the local history section of Palazzo Vecchio, an inscription recalls the foundation of the building in 1285 by the captain of the Guelph party Rolandino da Canossa, while another, later, celebrates the passage of King Frederick IV of Denmark in 1708, on his journey to Venice. The exterior is decorated with Marzocco while the interior lunette contains traces of a fresco depicting the Madonna and saints.

Just outside the door was the complex of the convent of San Gallo, the work of Giuliano da Sangallo, who got his nickname "da Sangallo" from this much-loved building. It was destroyed, along with many others, to clear the cannons from the walls in preparation for the siege of Florence (1529-1530).

It is also outside this gate, in the stony bed of the Mugnone that served as a moat, that Calandrino's search for the Heliotrope (Boccaccio, Decameron VIII, 3) is set.

It was also in this area of Porta San Gallo, outside the walls of Florence, that the Strozzi villa was located, which differed from the other houses in the area because it housed a group of courtesans - including Camilla Pisana - in the exclusive service of the master of the house, Filippo Strozzi, and his group of "giovani scapestrati".
