= Piazza della Libertà, Florence =

Major piazza in Florence

Coordinates: 43°47′02″N 11°15′43″E

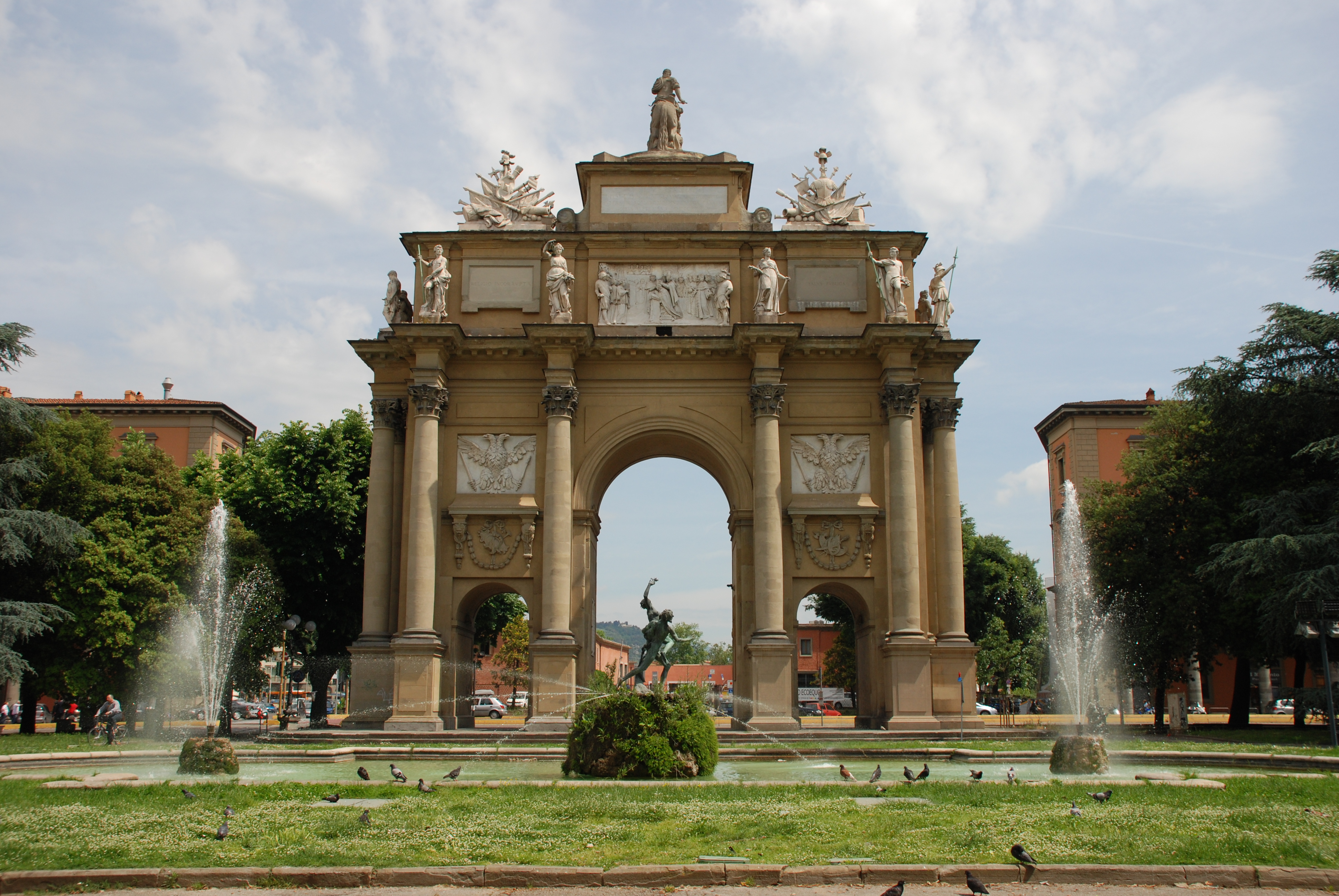
The square

Piazza della Libertà (Italian pronunciation: [ˈpjattsa della liberˈta]) is the northernmost point of the historic centre of Florence, Italy. It was built in the 19th century during the works to produce the Viali di Circonvallazione around the city. It hosts Triumphal Arch of the Lorraine and, in winter, an ice rink for skating.

== History and architecture ==
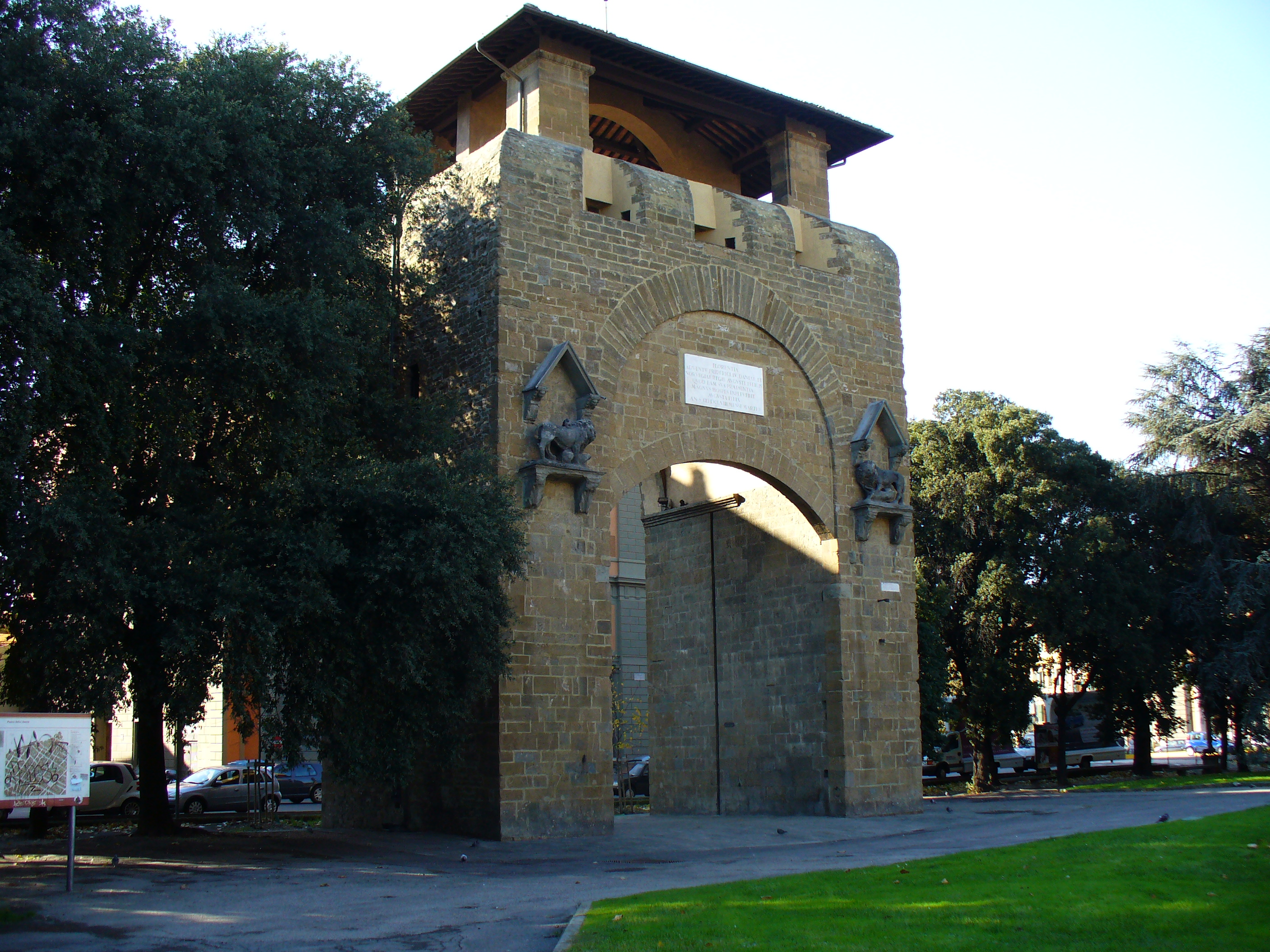
Porta San Gallo

A clearing around Porta San Gallo has existed since the fourteenth century and its name has historically been Porta San Gallo Square. In 1738, the square's Triumphal Arch of the Lorraine was erected to celebrate the arrival of the Habsburg-Lorraine dynasty in Florence.

In 1865, the demolition of the medieval walls allowed for a new reshaping of the area by the architect Giuseppe Poggi, completed in 1875 in the present elliptical shape square, surrounded by palaces. In the middle of the tree-lined park is a pool with fountains in front of the triumphal arch.

The square was named Camillo Cavour square, changed in 1930 to Costanzo Ciano square, in 1944 to Muti square, and in the 1945 permanently to Piazza della Libertà or Liberty square.

== The Parterre ==
The Parterre of Florence can be found on the northern portion of the square. There was a French garden in the 18th century that was wanted by Granduca Pietro Leopoldo, when Giuseppe Poggi created the square (when Florence was the capital of Kingdom of Italy), but he decided not to modify it.

In 1922, the architect Enrico Fantappié built the Palace of Exhibition in this area.

== Gallery ==
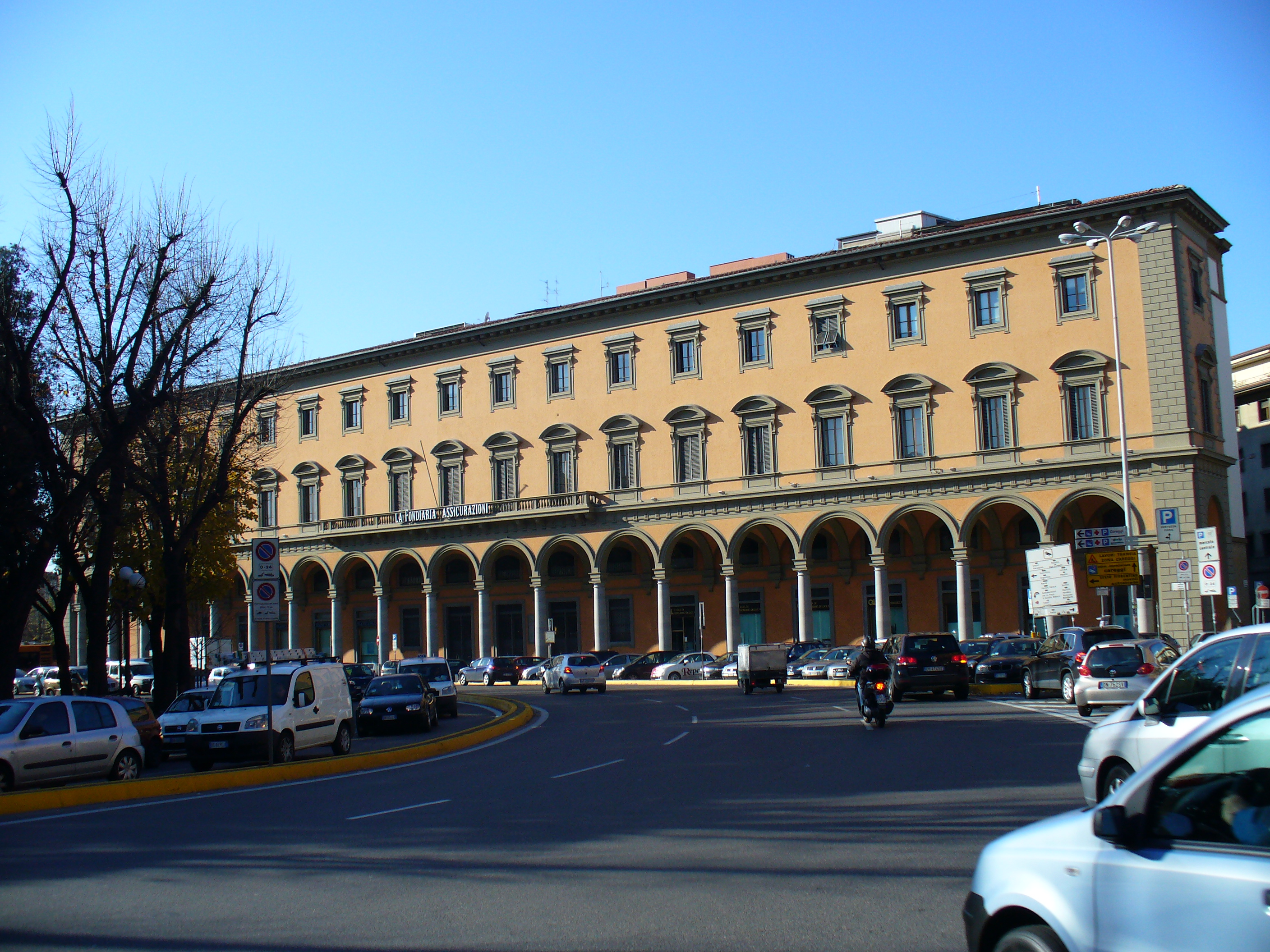
Palaces over the square

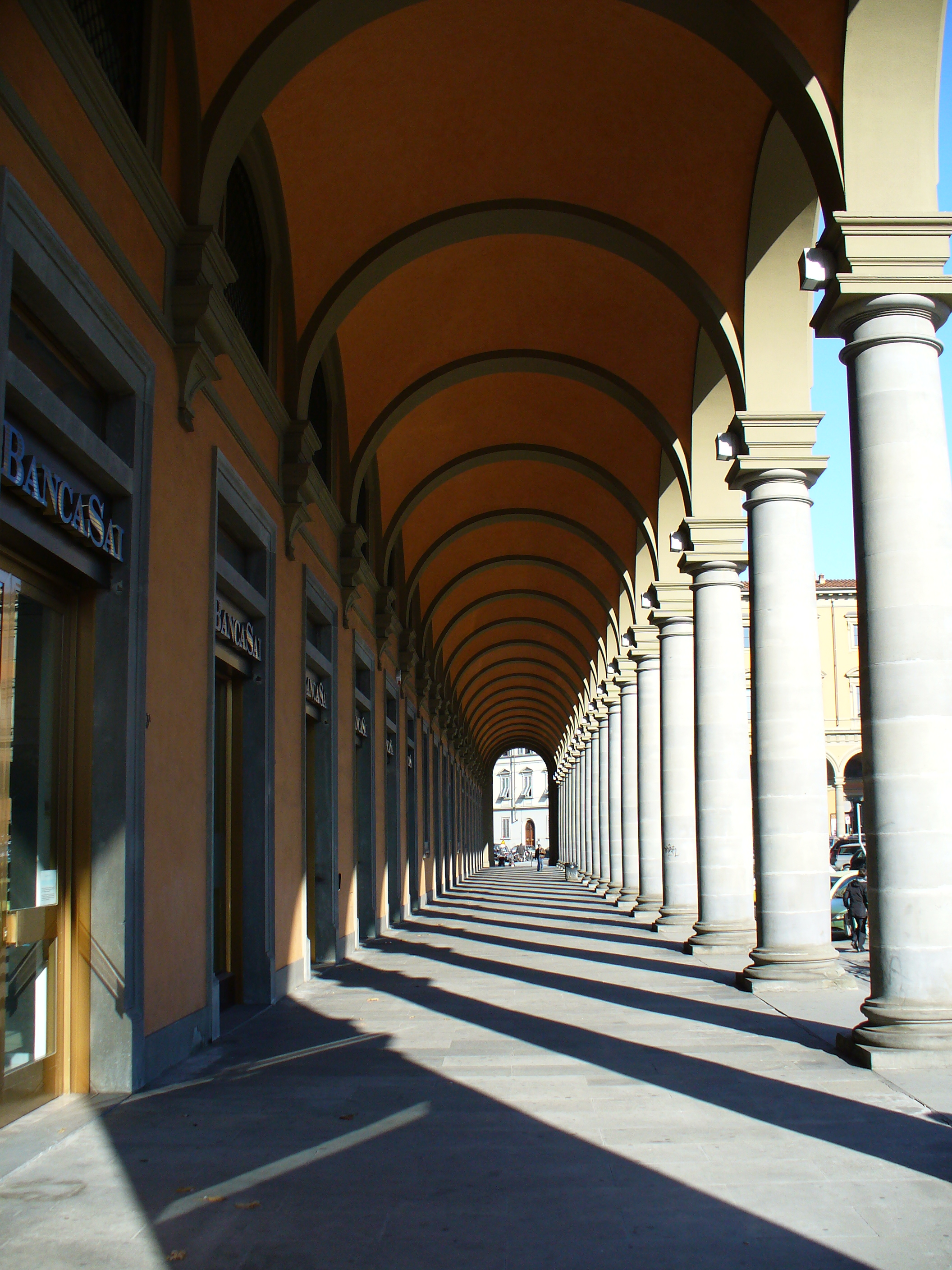
Porch

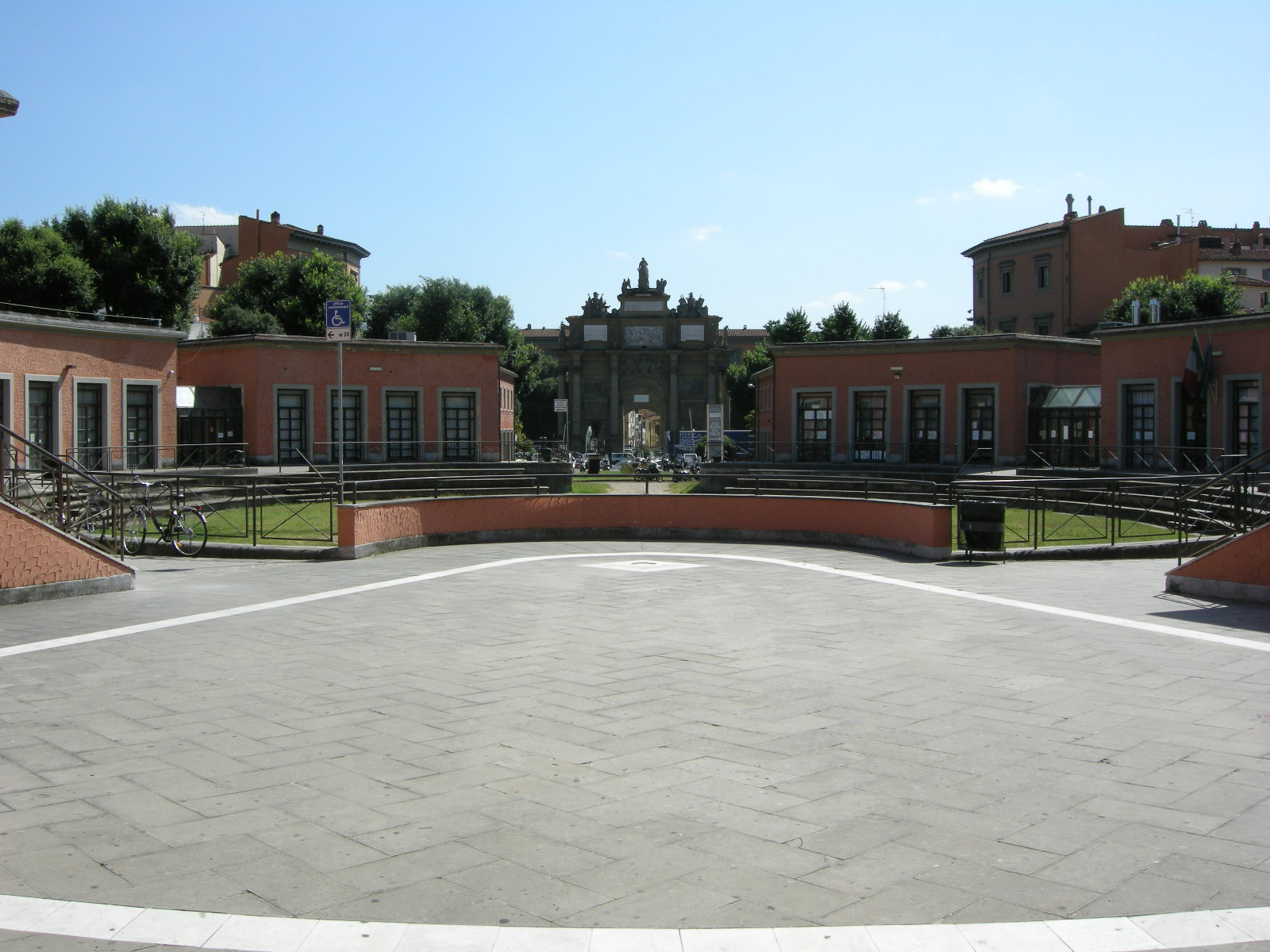
Parterre

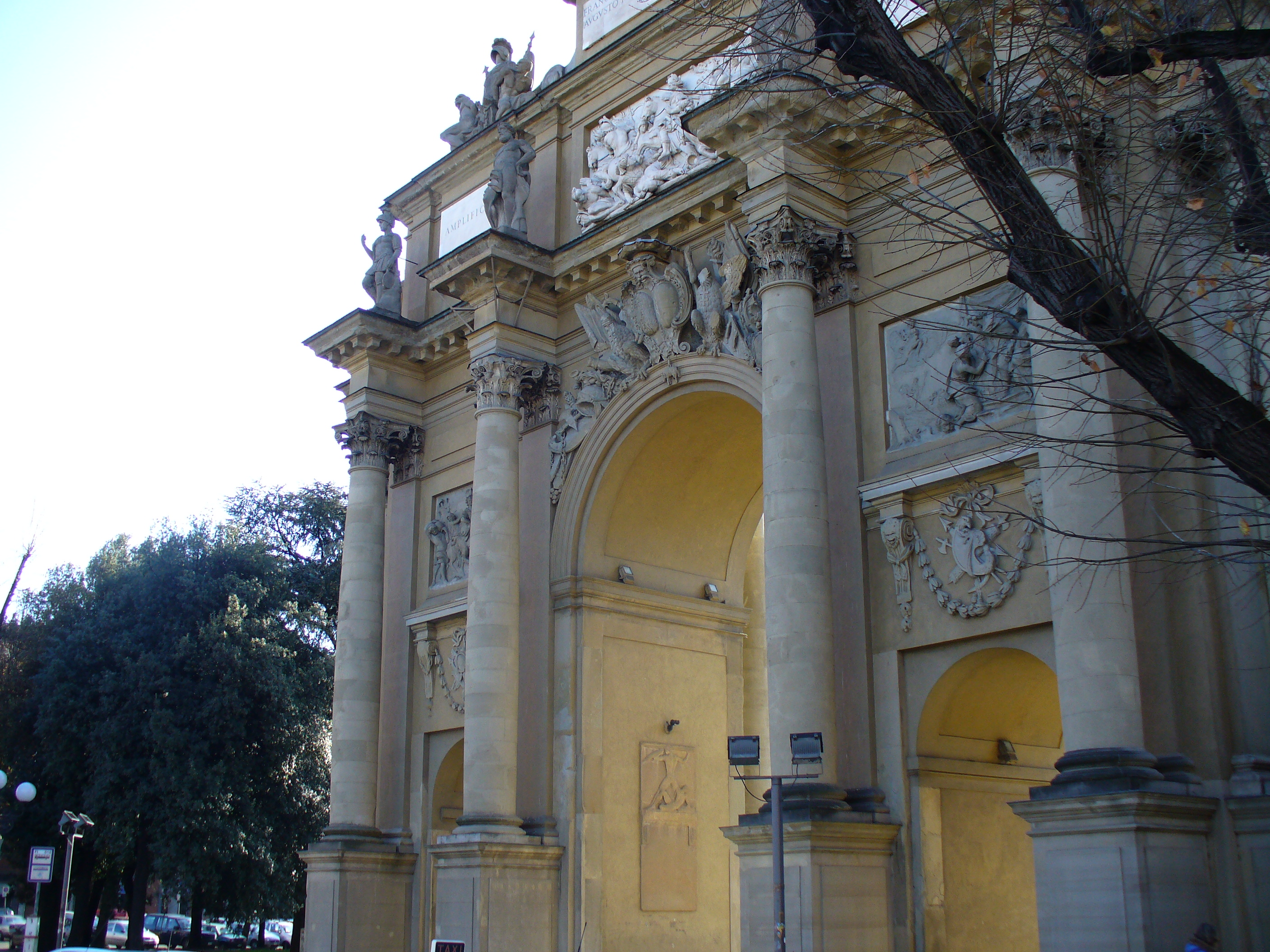
Triumphal arch

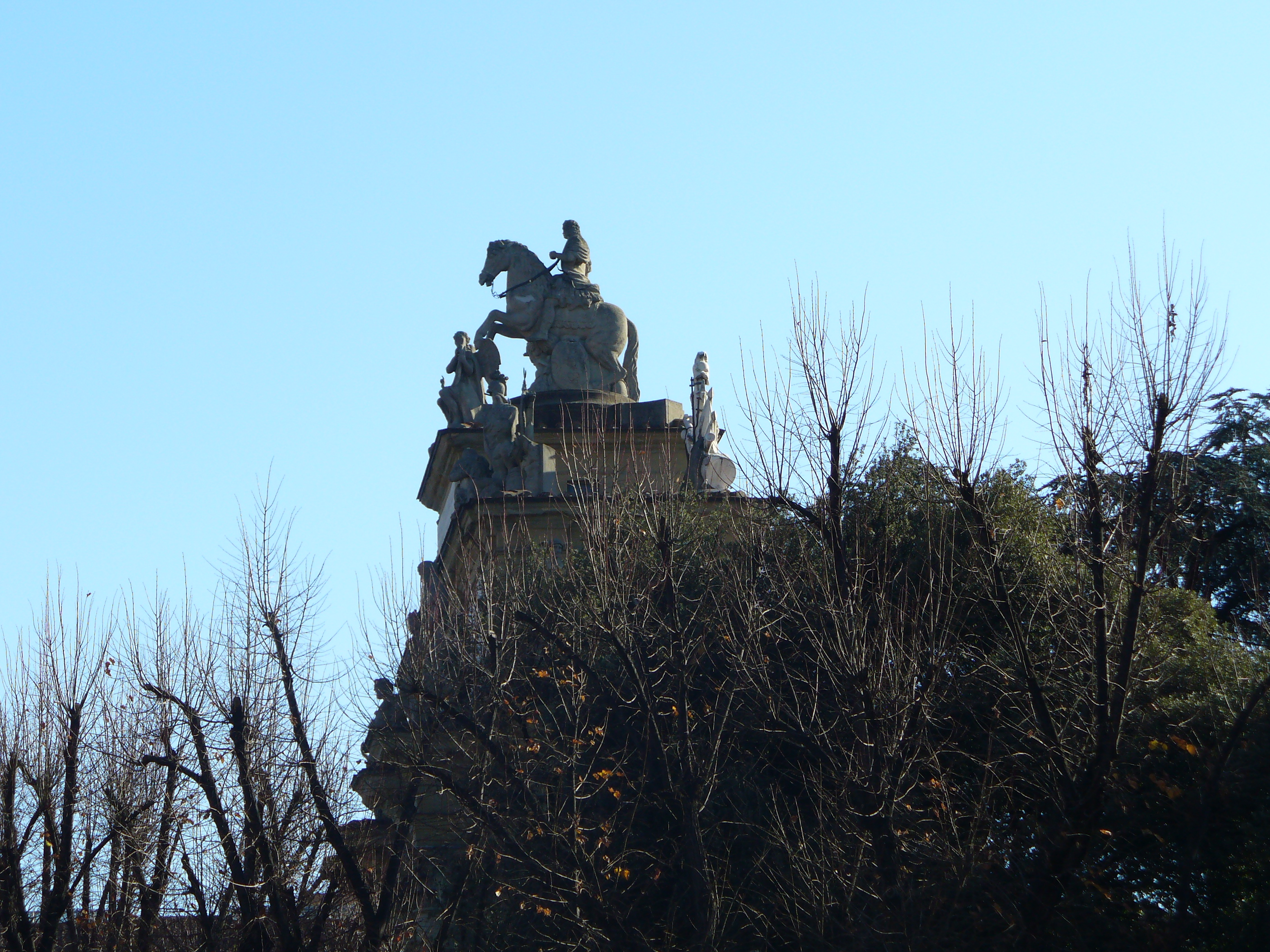
Statues over the triumphal arch
