= Giuseppe Poggi =

Italian architect

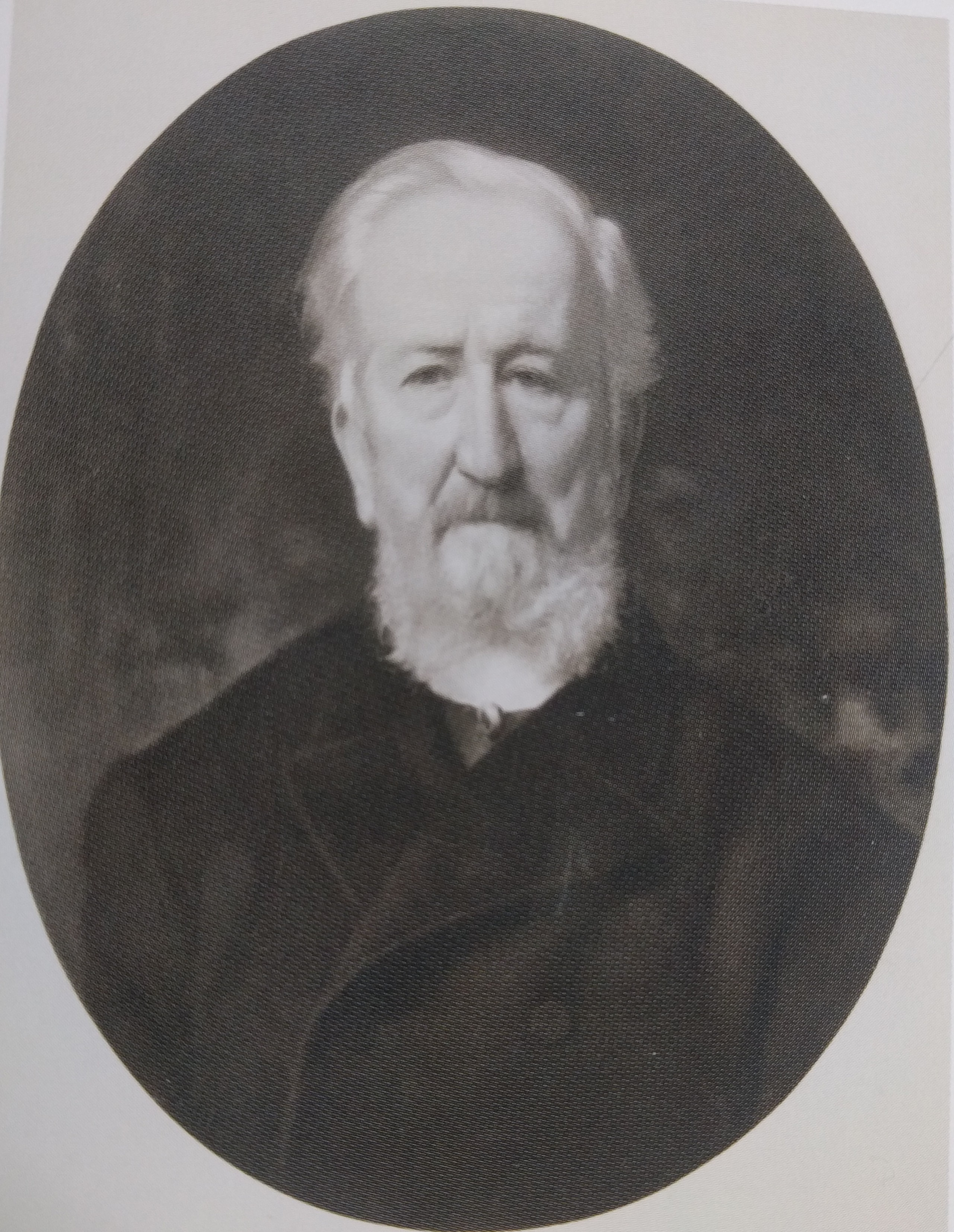
- Giuseppe Poggi
- Born: 3 April 1811; Florence, First French Empire
- Died: 19 March 1901 (aged 89); Florence, Kingdom of Italy
- Occupations: Architect; Urban planner
- Movement: Neoclassicism
- Spouse: Fulvia Poccianti (m. 1850)
- Projects: Viali di Circonvallazione; Piazza Cesare Beccaria; Piazza della Libertà; Piazzale Michelangelo

Giuseppe Poggi (3 April 1811 – 19 March 1901) was an Italian architect, mainly active in Florence. From 1864 he designed the city's urban renovation, which included the demolition of the walls, and the creation of the Viali di Circonvallazione to encircle the city. At the sites of the former gates of the city, he created scenographic squares, such as the Piazza Cesare Beccaria and the Piazza della Libertà. He also designed the viale dei Colli, a panoramic walk ending with the Piazzale Michelangelo.

== Biography ==
=== Early career ===
A native of Florence, he was articled (1828–35) to the architect and engineer Bartolommeo Silvestri (1781–1851). From 1835 to 1838 he practised engineering, but in the late 1830s he took up architecture.

Poggi received numerous commissions from the city's upper bourgeoisie for renovations of palaces and gardens. His first commission was the remodelling (1839) of the villa of Conte Giuseppe Archinto alle Forbici in the hills between Florence and San Domenico, and the layout of the adjoining park (completed 1856). Other early works, which were Neoclassical in style, included designs for a villa at Porta al Prato and refurbishment of a palazzo in the Via Cavour, Florence (both from 1841), for the Poniatowski family; and restoration of the Palazzo Guicciardini (from 1843 ) in the Lungarno Guicciardini, and of the Villa Guadagni, known as ‘Delle Lune’ (from 1845), at San Domenico Fiesole.

=== Mature work ===
After service as a volunteer in the First Italian War of Independence (1848), and marriage in 1850 to the daughter of Pasquale Poccianti, Poggi resumed his busy architectural practice. During the next 15 years he became the most sought-after architect in Florence, both for new work and restorations for Florentine high society, which was much impressed by the grandeur of the Second French Empire. His new buildings included the Ospizio Marino (1856–61) in Viareggio; the Palazzo Calcagnini Arese and the Villa Favard (both begun 1857) on the Nuovo Lungarno next to the Parco delle Cascine, Florence; a new atrium (1859), inspired by Brunelleschi, for the Villa Normanby (now Finaly), east of Florence; and the Palazzo Valery (begun 1860) in Bastia, Corsica.

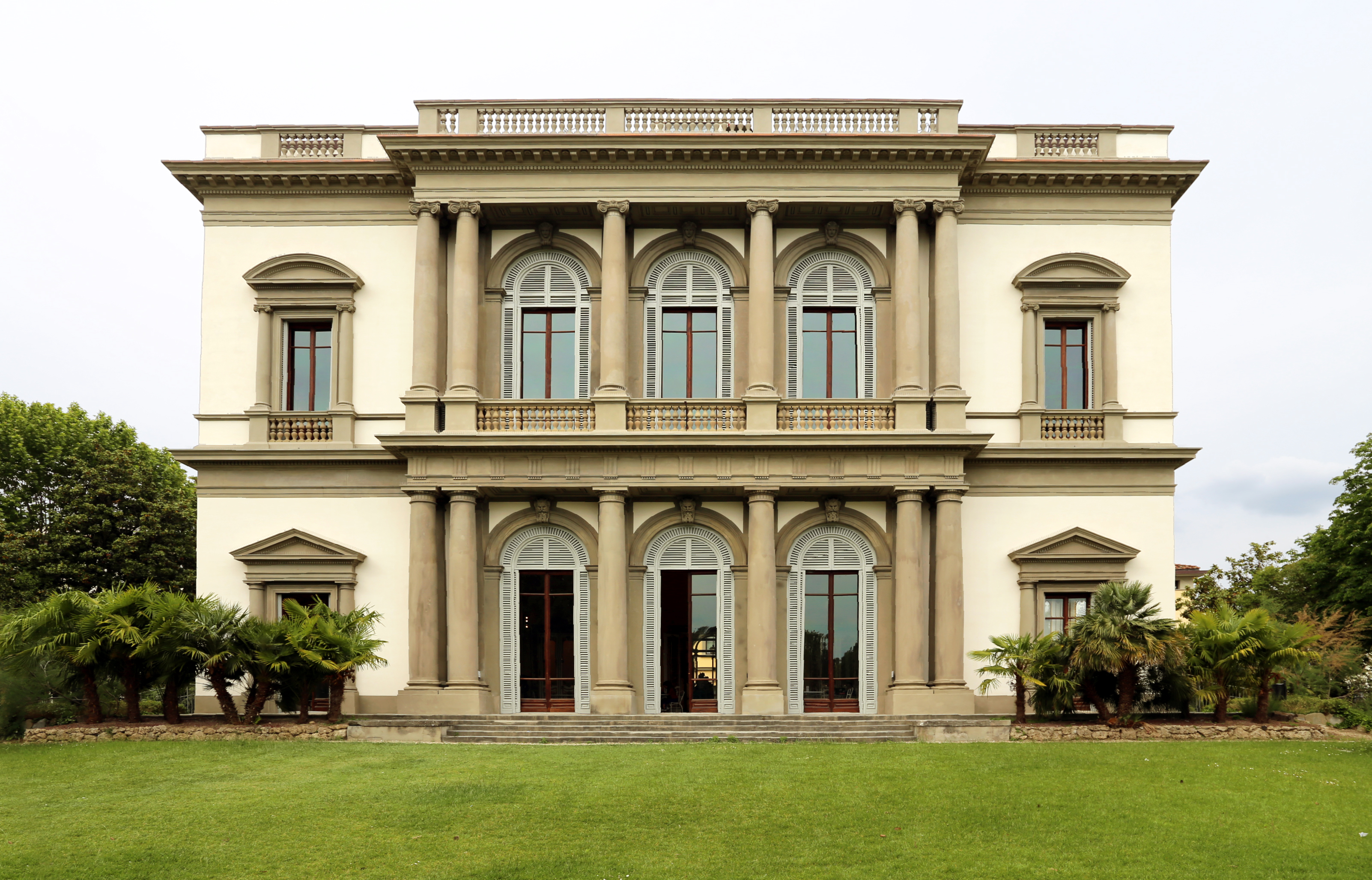
Villa Favard, Florence

The Villa Favard (now the Facoltà di Scienze Economiche e Commerciali) represents the highpoint of Poggi’s Renaissance Revival classicism, expressed in the façades and in the rich and refined decoration of the interiors, for which he engaged a number of artists, including the painters Annibale Gatti and Cesare Mussini and the wood-carver Rinaldo Barbetti. Poggi also designed for the Baronessa Favard an elegant funerary chapel (begun 1860 ) in the Villa di Rovezzano on the eastern outskirts of Florence.

His numerous commissions for restoration and remodelling work in Florence included the Palazzo Gerini (1850–60) in the Via Ricasoli; Palazzo Antinori (from 1853), Piazza Antinori; Palazzo Orloff (1861), Via della Scala; and Palazzo Strozzi (begun 1864 ), Via degli Strozzi, as well as several villas, notably Villa Stibbert (1853) at Montughi. He also designed parks and gardens, becoming recognized as an authority on garden architecture and a sensitive and enlightened interpreter of landscape gardening theory.

=== Urban renovation of Florence ===
When the capital of the new kingdom of Italy was transferred from Turin to Florence in 1865, Poggi was appointed to direct the expansion of the city to reflect its new status. This important public commission took up all his time from 1864 to 1877 and brought him wide recognition. His work involved the creation of new avenues and squares for the city; flood defences; modernization of the sewage system; an official plan for new residential areas and road layout; improvement of the water supply; a new livestock market and public abbatoirs; the relocation of the railway network and the creation of a new station on the outskirts of the city; and the construction of the Viale dei Colli and Piazzale Michelangelo, for which he achieved most renown.

The demolition of the early 14th-century walls on the right bank of the River Arno, their replacement with wide boulevards and the creation of new squares around the old city gates made an enormous contribution to the establishment of a modern image for Florence.

=== Architectural restoration theories ===
Poggi exerted considerable influence on the theory of architectural restoration in Italy, both in his executed projects and in his writings. In contrast to the contemporary, fashionable ideas of Viollet-le-Duc, Poggi was among the first to assert the need for restoration that preserved existing work of all periods, including the then unfashionable Baroque, and he played an important role in the Servizio Nazionale di Tutela dei Monumenti created after the political unification of Italy.

== Bibliography ==
- Catini, Raffaella (2015). "POGGI, Giuseppe". Dizionario Biografico degli Italiani (in Italian). Vol. 84: Piovene–Ponzo. Rome: Istituto dell'Enciclopedia Italiana. ISBN 978-88-12-00032-6.
