= Bevilacqua (surname) =

Bevilacqua (pronounced [beviˈlakkwa], lit. 'drink the water') is an Italian surname. Notable people with the surname include:

- Bevilacqua dynasty, a northern Italian medieval ruling family
- Alberto Bevilacqua (1934–2013), Italian writer and film director
- Alma Bevilacqua (1910–1988), Italian novelist and resistance fighter
- Aloysius Bevilacqua (1618–1679), Italian Roman Catholic prelate
- Anthony Bevilacqua (1923–2012), American Roman Catholic cardinal
- Antonella Bevilacqua (born 1971), Italian high jumper
- Antonio Bevilacqua (1918–1972), Italian cyclist
- Antonio Bevilacqua (cyclist, born 1957), Italian cyclist
- Berna Bevilacqua (1950–1996), Argentine pianist
- Bonifazio Bevilacqua Aldobrandini (1571–1627), Italian cardinal
- Carlotta de Bevilacqua (born 1957), Italian architect, designer and entrepreneur
- Charles A. Bevilacqua (1930–2019), United States Navy Seabee
- Claire Bevilacqua (born 1983), Australian surfer
- Daniel Bevilacqua (1945–2020), French singer and songwriter known by the stage name Christophe
- Ercole Bevilacqua (1554–1600), Italian nobleman
- Francis Bevilacqua (1923–2009), American politician
- Giacomo Bevilacqua (born 1983), Italian cartoonist and author of comics
- Giovanni Ambrogio Bevilacqua (fl. 1481–1512), Italian painter
- Giovanni Carlo Bevilacqua (1775–1849), Italian painter
- Girolamo Bevilacqua (died 1604), Italian Roman Catholic prelate
- Giulia Bevilacqua (born 1979), Italian actress
- Giulio Bevilacqua (1881–1965), Italian Roman Catholic cardinal
- Giuseppe Bevilacqua, American Murder suspect
- Joe Bevilacqua (born 1959), American actor and writer
- Joseph A. Bevilacqua Sr. (1918–1989), American jurist
- Luiz Bevilacqua, Brazilian scientist
- Mattia Bevilacqua (born 1998), Italian cyclist
- Maurizio Bevilacqua (born 1960), Canadian politician
- Patricia Bevilacqua (born 1965), Brazilian judoka
- Peter Bevilacqua (1933–2025), Australian rules footballer and soccer player
- Philip Bevilacqua (born 1965), American biological chemist
- Simone Bevilacqua (born 1997), Italian cyclist
- Tony Bevilacqua (born 1976), American musician
- Ventura Salimbeni (1568–1613), later called Bevilacqua, Italian painter and printmaker

== Other uses ==
- Matthew Bevilacqua, a character on the HBO TV series The Sopranos
- Bevilacqua-Lazise Altarpiece, oil-on-canvas painting by Paolo Veronese
- Palazzo Bevilacqua-Costabili, Renaissance palace in Ferrara, Italy
- Tessiture Luigi Bevilacqua, Italian textile company
- 14953 Bevilacqua, a minor planet
