= Drinkwater =

Drinkwater is a surname of English medieval origin. The German equivalent is Trinkwasser, in Italian Bevilacqua and in French Boileau.

== People with the surname ==
- Arthur Thomas Drinkwater (1894–1972), Australian-born World War I flying ace
- Barbara L. Drinkwater (1926–2019), American sports physiologist
- Ben Drinkwater (1910–1949), British motorcycle racer
- Bert Drinkwater (1895–1947), Australian footballer
- Carol Drinkwater (born 1948), Anglo-Irish actress and author
- Charles Drinkwater (soccer), American soccer player
- Danny Drinkwater (born 1990), English football player
- Gary Drinkwater, American politician
- Graham Drinkwater (1875–1946), Canadian ice hockey player, businessman and philanthropist
- Harry Drinkwater (1844–1895), British architect
- Harold Drinkwater (1855–1925), British botanical artist
- John Drinkwater (musician, technologist), (born 1957), English musician and sound technologist
- John Drinkwater (playwright), (1882–1937), English poet and dramatist
- John F. Drinkwater (born 1947), British historian
- Josh Drinkwater (born 1992), Australian rugby player
- Muriel Drinkwater, 12-year-old girl murdered in Wales in 1946
- Peter Drinkwater (1750–1801), English textile businessman
- Ray Drinkwater (1931–2008), British soccer player
- Ros Drinkwater (1944–2022), Scottish-born actress
- Samuel Drinkwater (1742–1834), American sea captain
- Scott Drinkwater (born 1997), Australian professional rugby league footballer
- Sean T. Drinkwater (born 1972), American musician
- Skip Drinkwater, American record producer
- Terry Drinkwater (1936–1989), American television and radio journalist
- William Drinkwater (1812–1909), Manx judge

== Fictional characters ==
- Gerris Drinkwater, in A Song of Ice and Fire by George R. R. Martin
- The Drinkwater clan (multiple generations) in Little,_Big, by John Crowley
- Nathaniel Drinkwater, protagonist of a series of novels by Richard Woodman
