= Lament over the Dead Christ (Veronese) =

Painting by Paolo Veronese

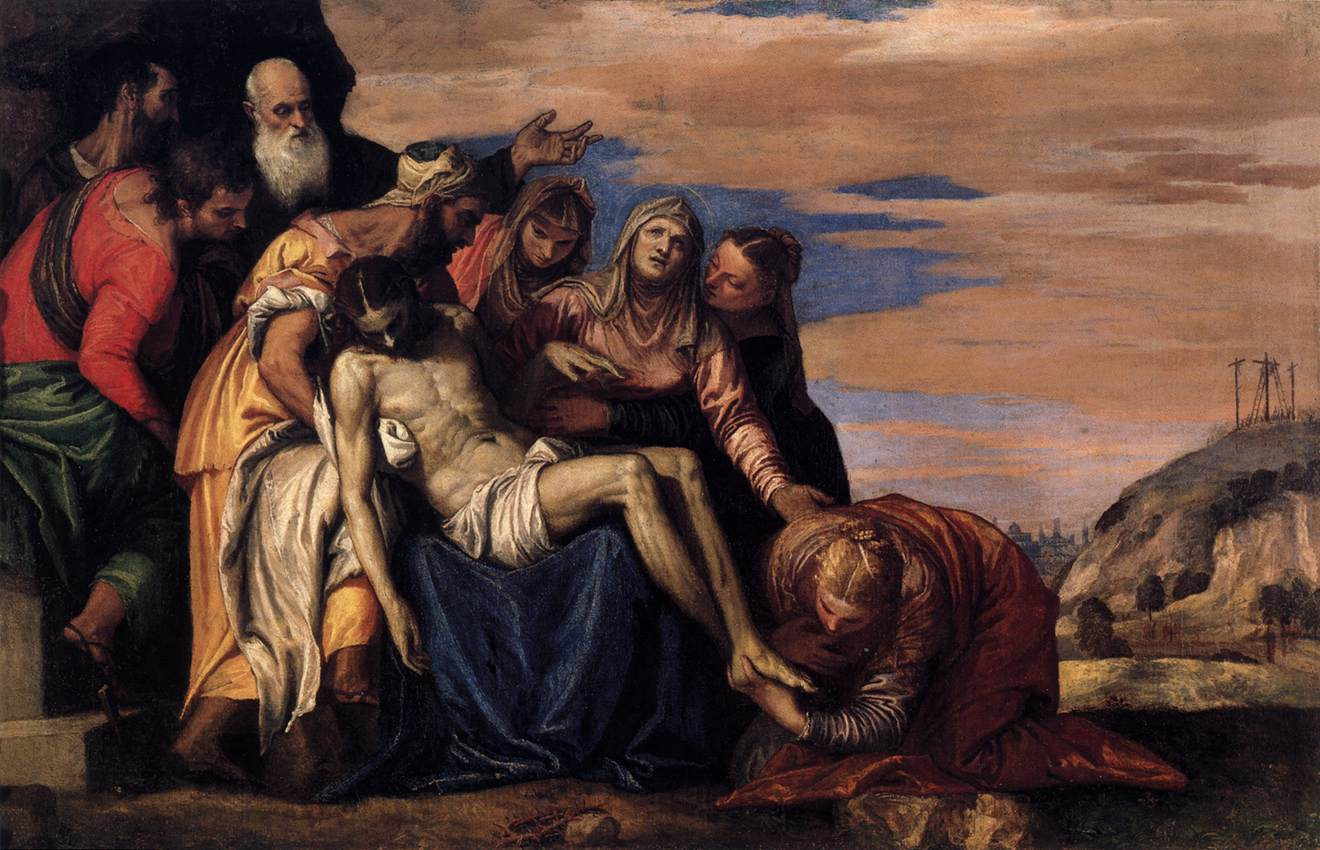
Lament over the Dead Christ (c. 1548) by Paolo Veronese

Lament over the Dead Christ is a c.1548 oil-on-canvas painting by the Italian Renaissance painter Paolo Veronese, now in the Museo di Castelvecchio in Verona.

It was commissioned by Hieronymite monks for the church of Santa Maria delle Grazie and completed in 1548, the same year as Bevilacqua-Lazise Altarpiece (now in the same museum). A 19th-century copy of Lament now hangs in the church of San Massimo all'Adige in Venice.
