= Giacomo Dondoli =

Italian painter

Giacomo Dondoli (active 17th – 18th century) was an Italian painter in Verona. He initially studied under Giovanni Battista Zannoni in Verona, then under Cavalier Coppa, and later under Pietro Ricchi (il Lucchese) in Trento. He painted for Charles I, Duke of Mantua. He mainly painted sacred subjects including a San Carlo for the church of the Ghiara in Verona; a Last Supper for San Fermo; a Death of Sant'Alessio for the church of the same name. He painted Nero watching Rome Burn and Story of Jacob. He was active in Verona circa 1717. His wife Caterina was also a painter.
