= Turone =

Turone is both a surname and a given name. Notable people with the name include:

- Maurizio Turone (born 1948), Italian footballer
- Turone da Verona (c. 1356–c. 1390), Italian painter

== See also ==
- Turones, a Celtic tribe of pre-Roman Gaul
