= Nanni di Bartolo =

Florentine Renaissance sculptor

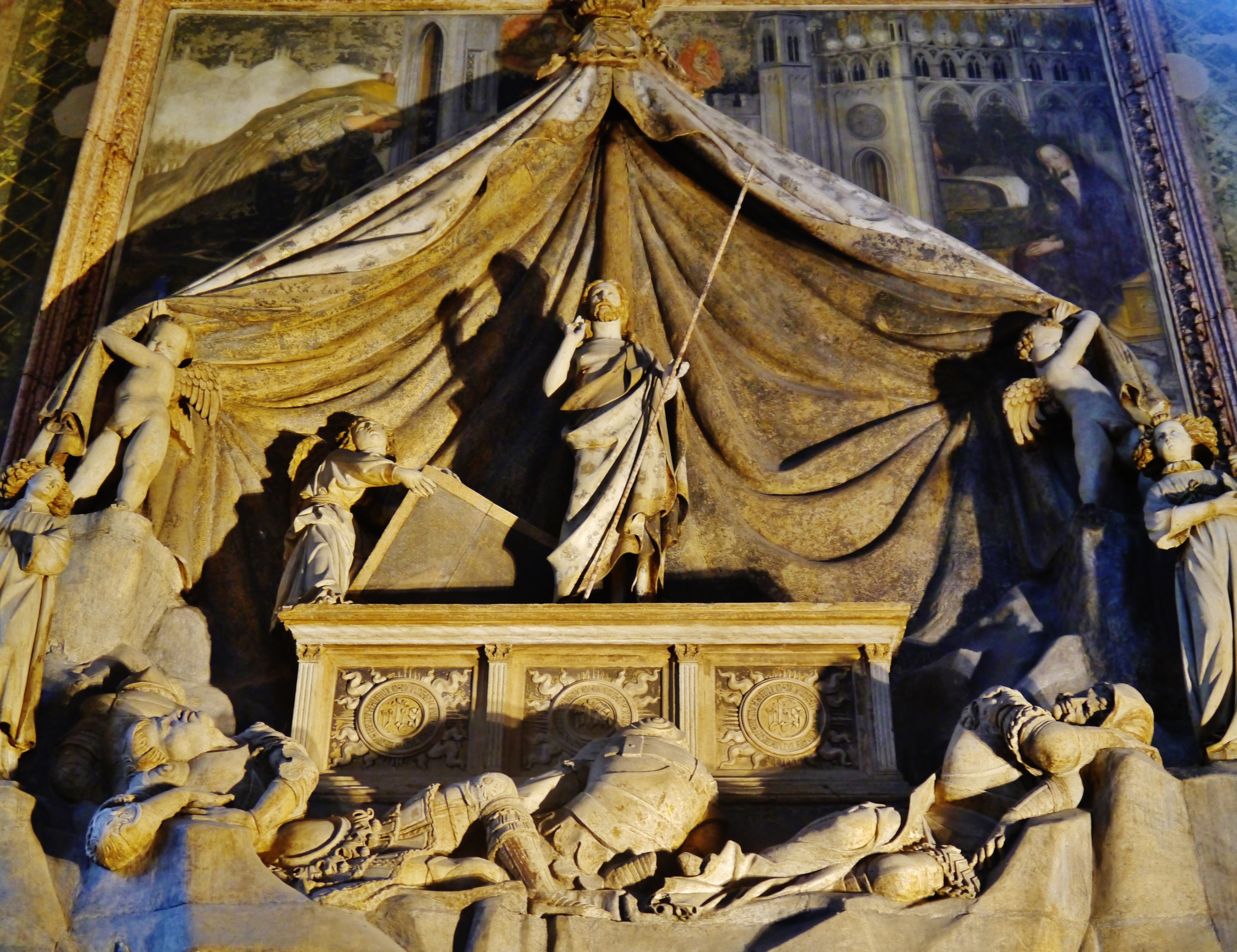
Resurrection group on the Brenzoni Monument, San Fermo Maggiore, Verona, late 1420s to 1439.

Nanni di Bartolo, also known as "il Rosso" ("the redhead"), was a Florentine sculptor of the Early Renaissance, a slightly younger contemporary of Donatello. His dates of birth and death are not known, but he is recorded as an active master from 1419 to 1451.

He is not to be confused with the slightly older, and more prominent, Florentine sculptor Nanni di Banco, and is often called "Rosso" in art history to avoid this. In both cases "Nanni" is a contraction of "Giovanni", Italian for "John". He was the son of a Friar Bartolo.

After a series of prominent commissions working with Donatello, the outstanding sculptor of the day in Florence, which was then the leading innovative centre of Italian Renaissance sculpture, Rosso is recorded as leaving Florence in February 1424, "at least partly to escape debts". Perhaps he also recognised that he could not compete at the top level with the hugely talented generation of sculptors active in Florence. For at least the next fifteen years he seems to have worked in Venice and the Venetian parts of north Italy, both spreading Florentine style, but also accommodating it to the local lingering taste for International Gothic elements.

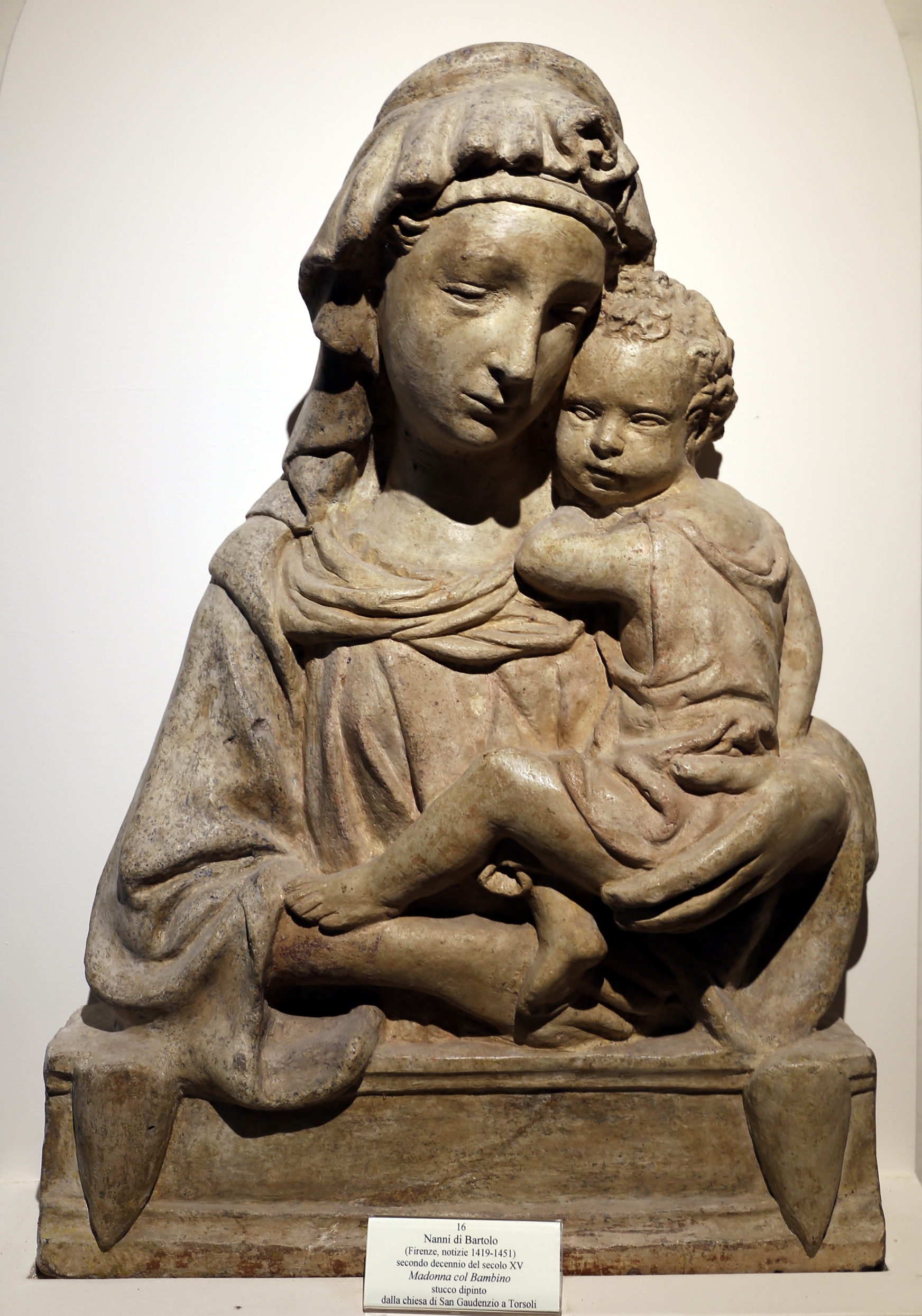
"Madonna ghibertiana, type A", painted plaster, San Gaudenzio, Torsoli, 1410s

Many works, mostly small but some large, are attributed to him with varying degrees of certainty, but some are signed. These include works in terracotta and plaster, many reliefs or busts of the Virgin Mary or saints. Dating comes entirely from documents such as contracts.

== Works ==
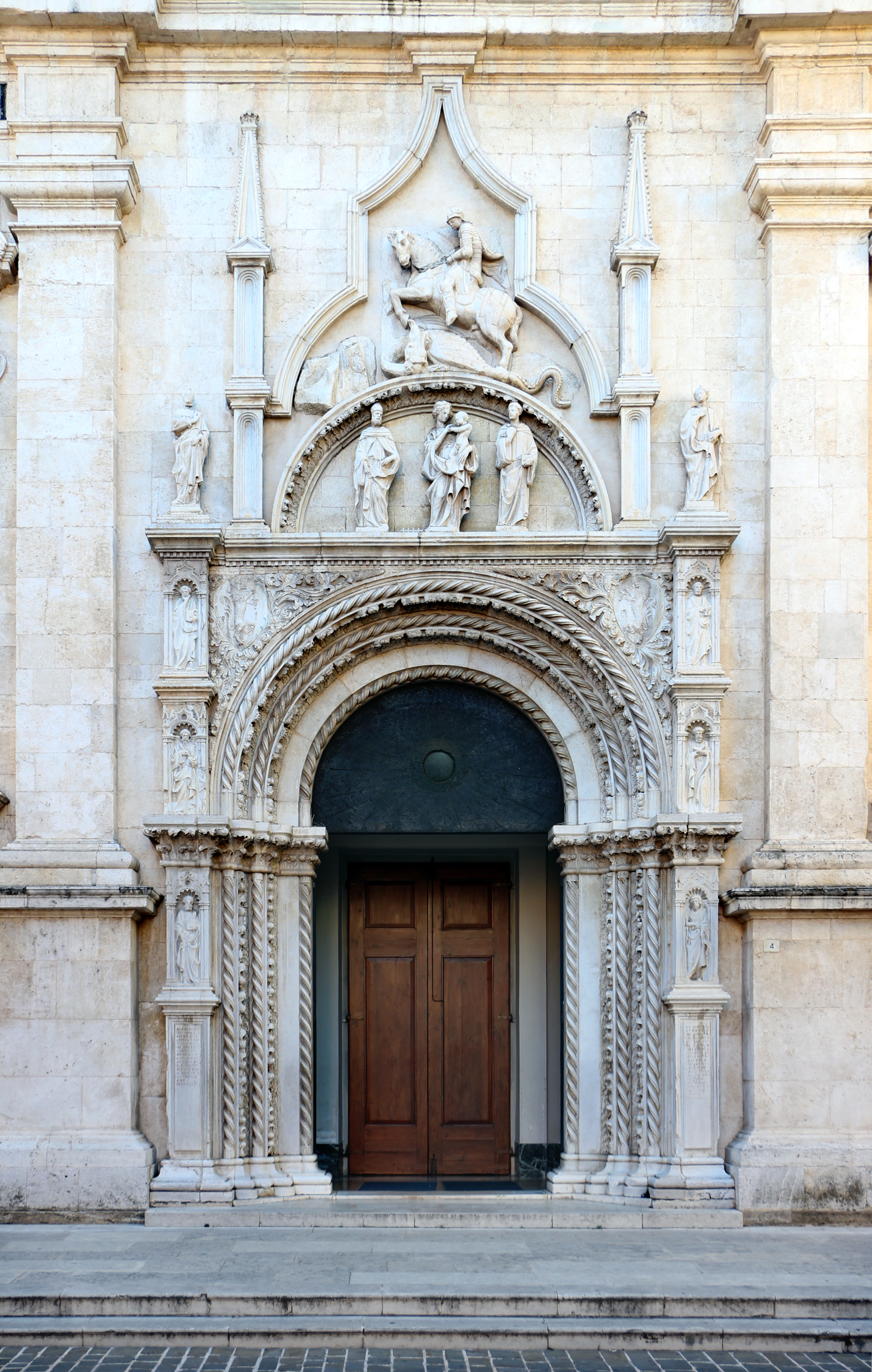
Entrance portal for the Basilica of Saint Nicholas of Tolentino, 1432–1435

A number of smaller works before 1410 are attributed to him, especially some of a type of half-length Virgin and Child in relief or free-standing, of which many versions survive in various materials, and for which Lorenzo Ghiberti may have produced the prototypes, leading to them sometimes being called the "madonna ghibertiana", with Types A and B, depending on the pose of the Virgin's hands.

Rosso collaborated with Donatello on statues for the higher levels of Giotto's Campanile adjoining the Florence Duomo (cathedral), by 1419 as "a fully fledged younger master" and by 1421 a "virtual partner" of Donatello. He also began a figure later reassigned to Bernardo Ciuffagni. He signed a statue of the prophet Obadiah, completed in 1422 according to the Duomo records, and probably worked with Donatello on the Sacrifice of Isaac (1421), where he perhaps did the drapery, and a "young prophet" or John the Baptist where he perhaps did more.

They were placed very high, and so were seen from a distance, at a sharp angle, factors which needed allowing for in the compositions, and made "fine detail virtually useless for visual effect". All the figures for this series were replaced on the Campanile by replicas in 1940, and the originals moved to the Museo dell'Opera del Duomo.

After he left Florence in 1424 he may have been associated with Niccolò di Pietro Lamberti, another Florentine sculptor, who with his son Pietro di Niccolò had already been established in Venice since 1421, after a first stay in 1416.

Rosso is attributed with parts of their major commission, for capitals on the exterior of the Doge's Palace. Rosso is thought to have executed a corner relief of the Judgement of Solomon above the ground floor, facing the Piazzetta, a very prominent position.

A number of the largest commissions in Venetian-controlled cities with which he was probably involved are wall tombs with large frames, some including significant paintings in the whole ensemble. The most striking of these is the Brenzoni Monument in the church of San Fermo Maggiore, Verona, which includes a Resurrection group of Christ, four sleeping soldiers, three angels, and two putti who hold back large canopy curtains in marble, a Venetian style in wall tombs, that here gives the scene something of the effect of a tableau vivant. Above this a fresco Annunciation is the earliest major work by the painter Pisanello to survive. The whole is topped by a statue of a prophet. The monument was probably begun in the 1420s, with the frescos done by 1426, but only finished in 1439.

Rosso is mentioned in the inscription:

QVEM GENUIT RUSSI FLORENTIA TUSCA IOHANNIS/ ISTUD SCULPSIT OPUS INGENIOSA MANUS: ("The ingenious hand of Giovanni the redhead, a child of Tuscan Florence, carved this work.")

Two similar large wall-tombs combining painting and sculpture, with which Rosso is regarded by some, but not others, as having been involved are firstly the Serego Monument for a general for the Scaliger family, rulers of Verona, in Sant'Anastasia, Verona, dating to about 1429. This is either by Rosso or the Lambertis, or a collaboration between them. It has an equestrian statue (less than life-size) above a sarcophagus, and as with the Brenzoni Monument this is disclosed by two figures holding back large drapes.

Secondly, there is the only large terracotta monument in Venice, commemorating the founder of the Frari Church, Beato Pacifico, executed around 1432–1437. This has a group of the Baptism of Christ with several figures, on top of a sarcophagus with reliefs; both are under an arch with numbers of half-length angels and sacred figures emerging from luxuriant foliage. If Rosso contributed to this work, it might only have been in making drawings for the composition.

In 1432–1435 he worked on the main entrance portal for the Basilica of Saint Nicholas of Tolentino, with an architectural framework that is "a strange mixture of Romanesque and Gothic motifs", not to mention classicizing Renaissance ones, with sculptures of Saint George and the Dragon above the Virgin and Child flanked by two saints. At each side, a saint or prophet stands singly at each of four levels. The Saint George seems to draw on a classical model.

The last mention of him in documentary records is in February 1452, in the records of Florence Cathedral, in connection with the transport and reallocation of a block he had abandoned at the Carrara marble quarries. It appears that he had already died by this point, perhaps as early as the late 1430s, after which there are currently no definite records of his activity.

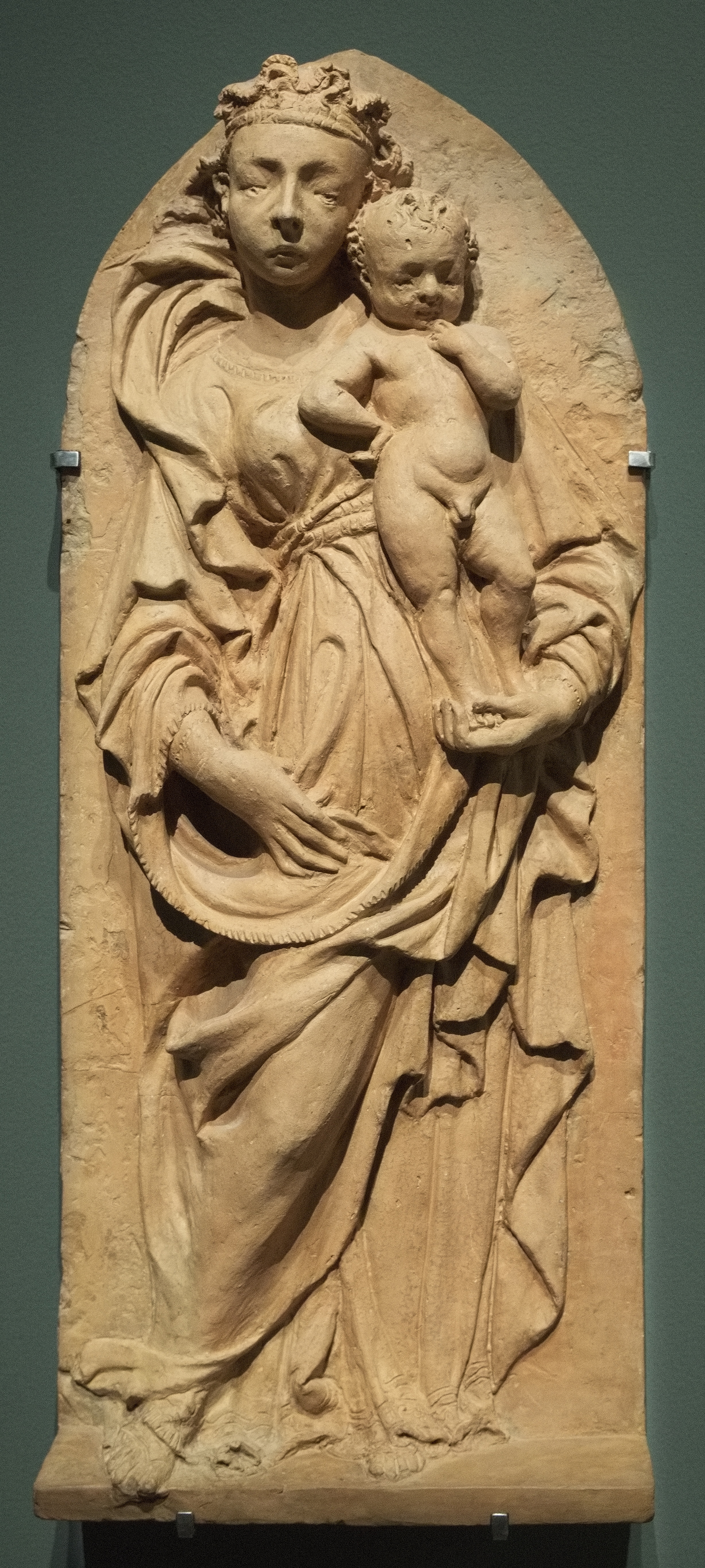
Virgin and Child, terracotta, 1415–1420, Berlin, Bode Museum

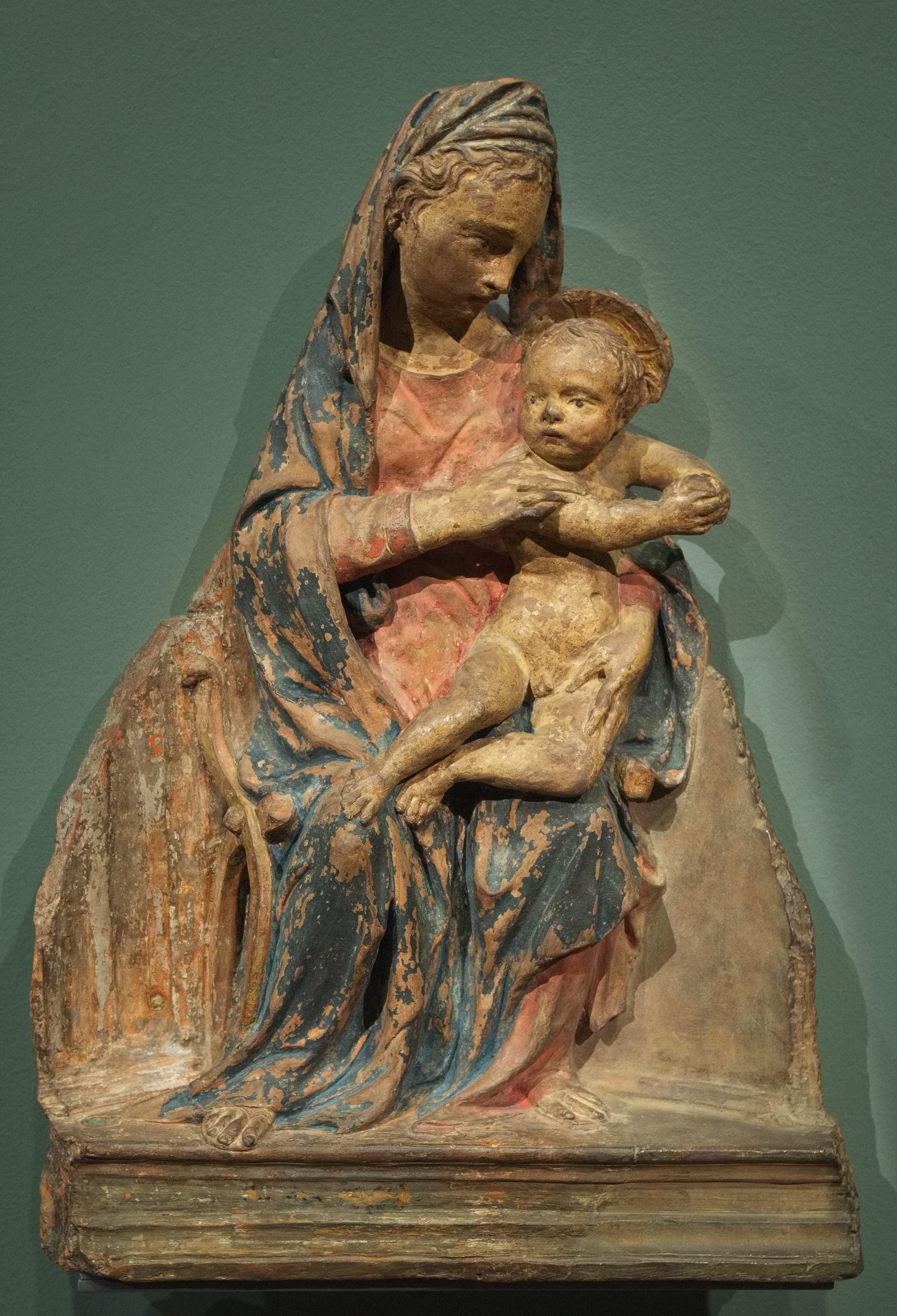
Virgin and Child, painted terracotta, c. 1420, Bode Museum

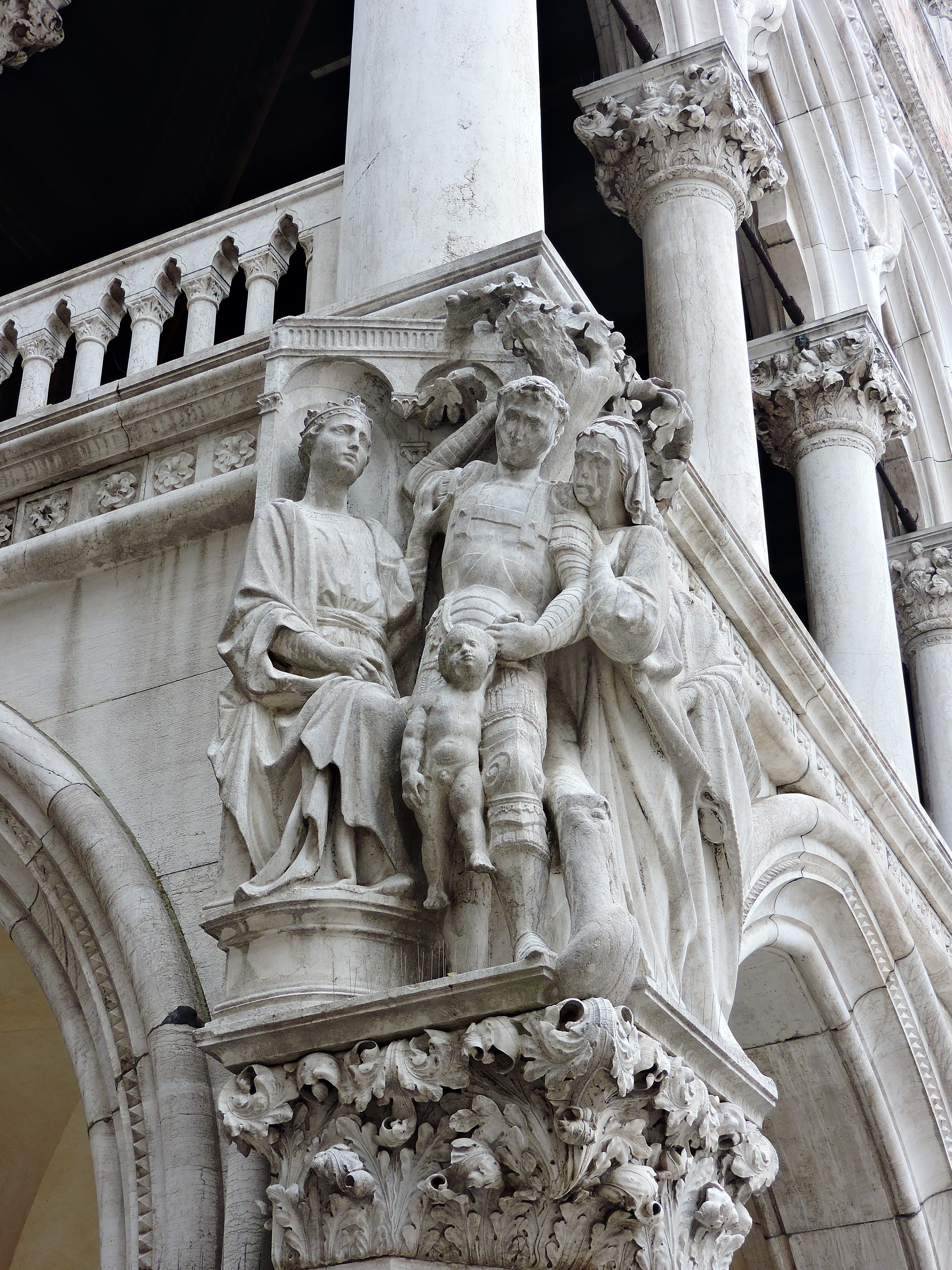
Judgement of Solomon, Doge's Palace, Venice, attributed

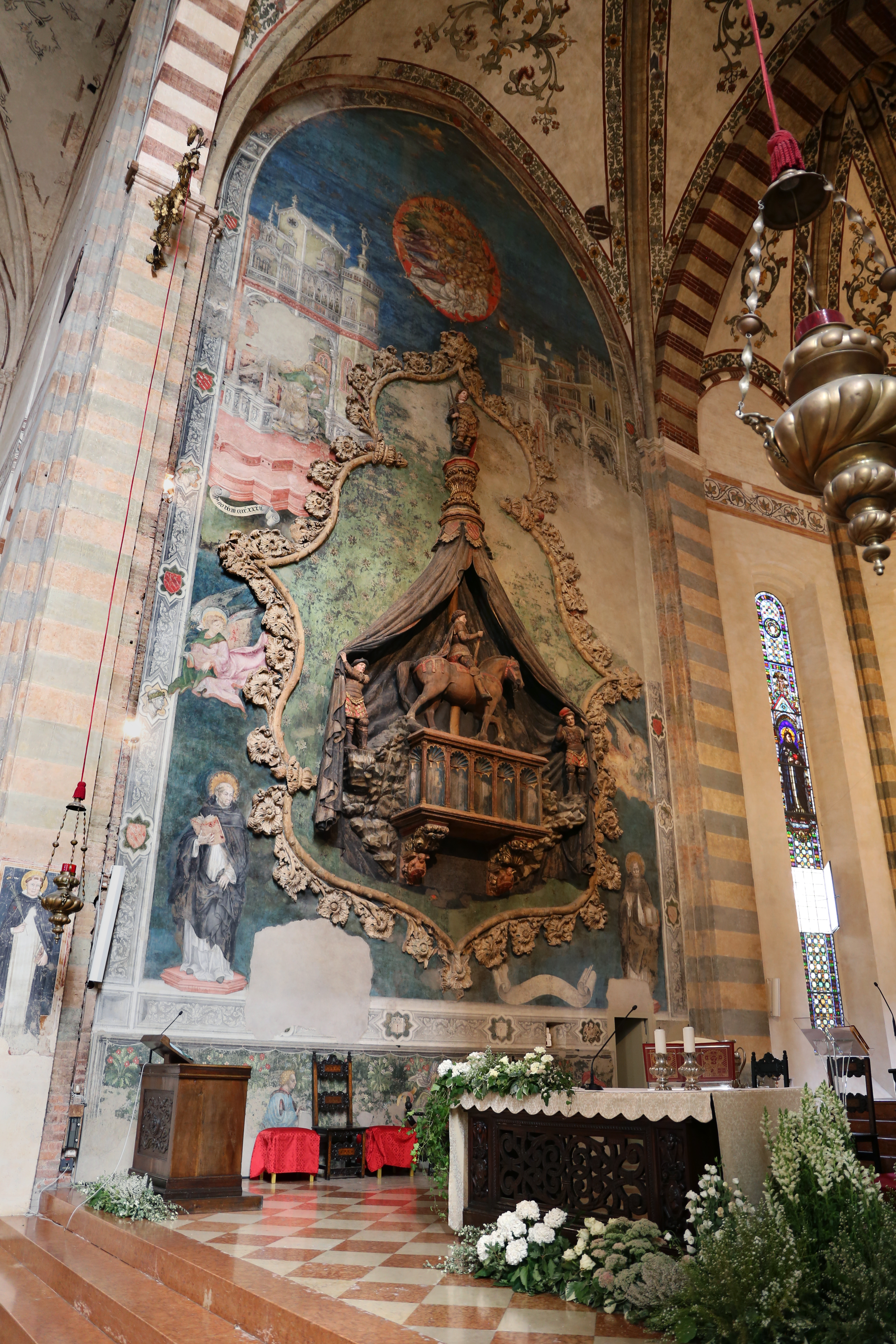
The Serego Monument for a general, Sant'Anastasia, Verona, 1429. Rosso and/or the Lambertis

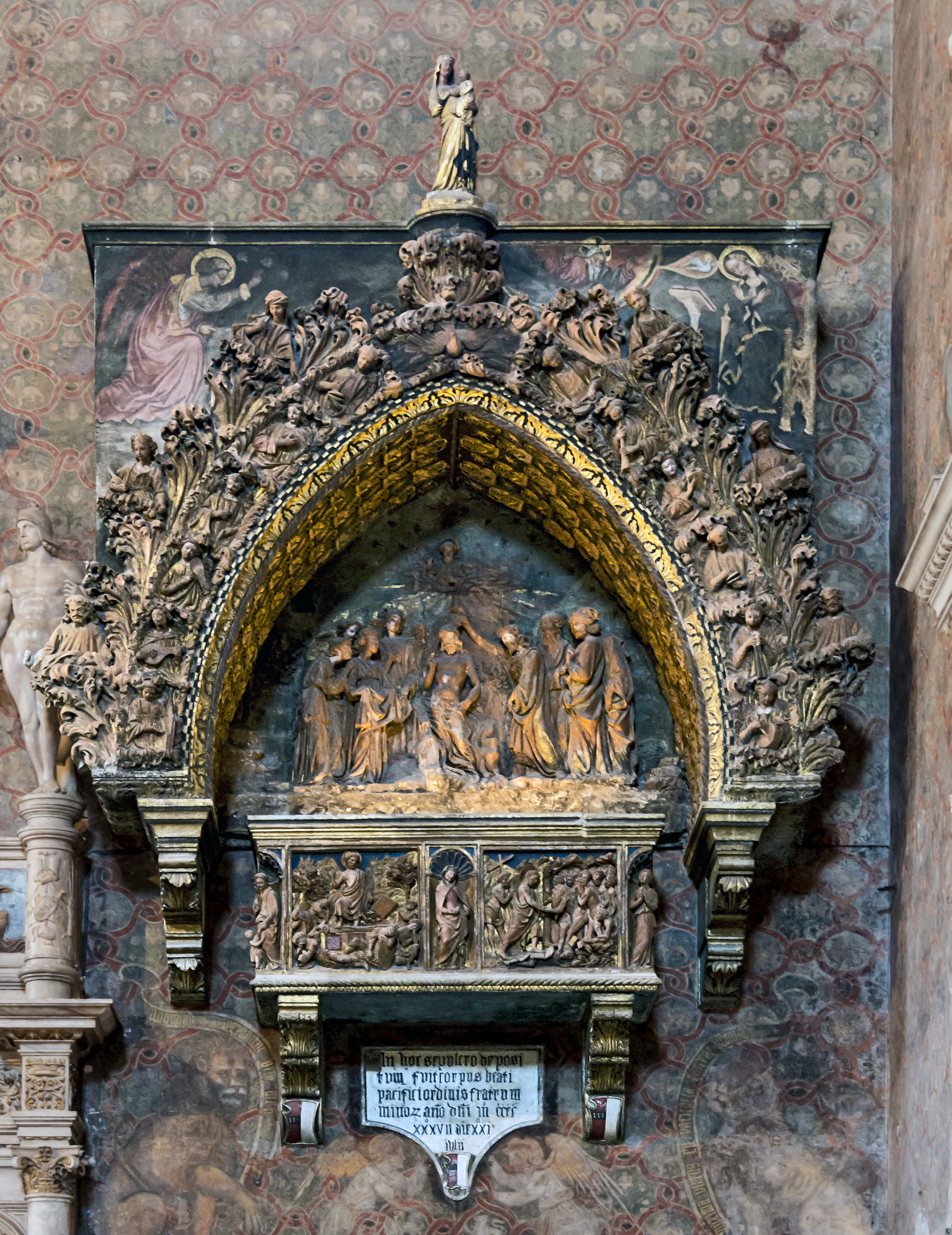
Terracotta monument to Beato Pacifico, 1432–1437, Frari Church, Venice, attributed.
