= Giotto's Campanile =

Bell tower in Florence, Italy

Coordinates: 43.772895°N 11.255235°E

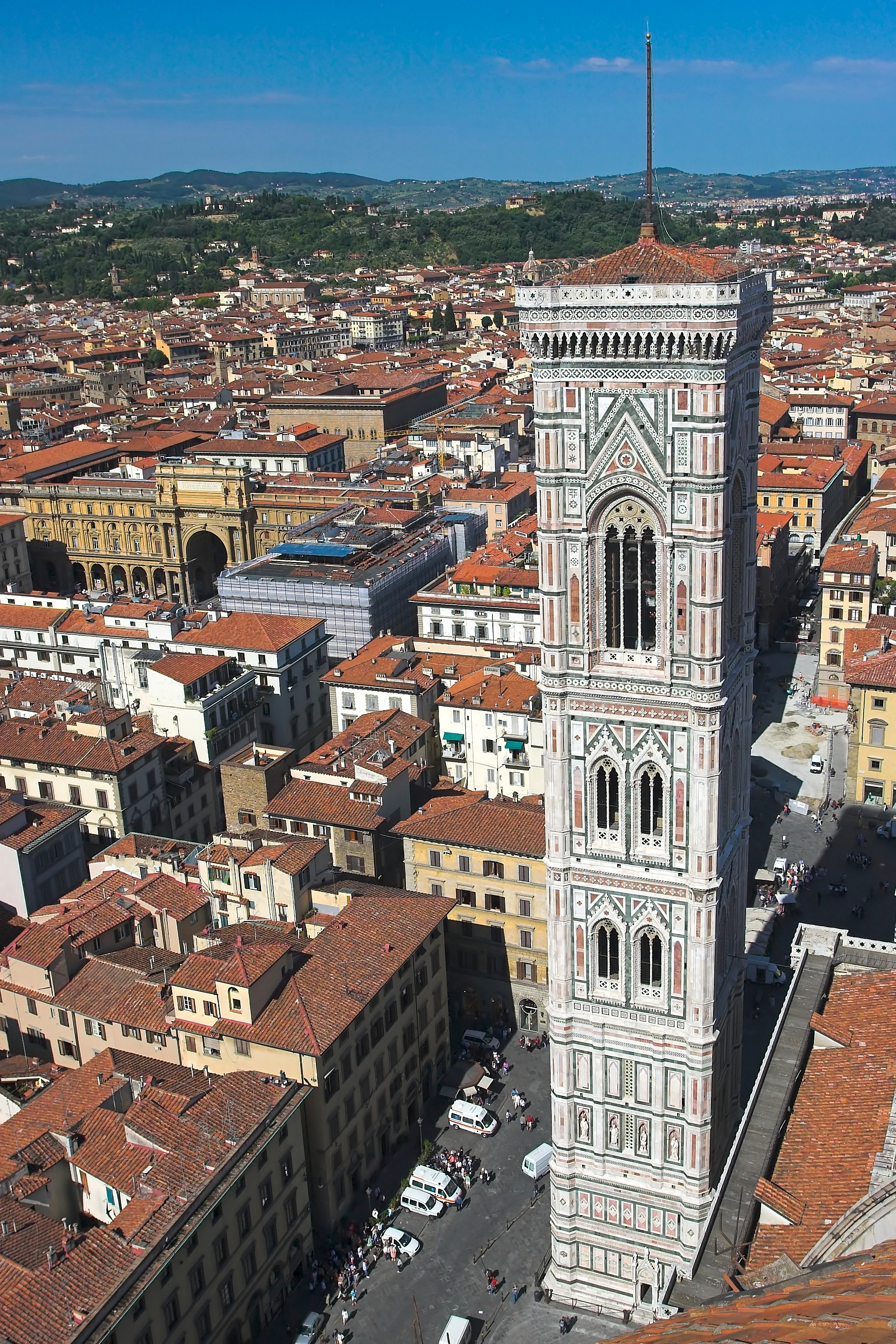
Giotto's bell tower seen from the top of the Duomo.

Giotto's Campanile (/ˌkæmpəˈniːli, -leɪ/, also US: /ˌkɑːm-/, Italian: [kampaˈniːle]) is a free-standing campanile (bell tower) that is part of the complex of buildings that make up Florence Cathedral on the Piazza del Duomo in Florence, Italy.

Standing adjacent to the Basilica of Santa Maria del Fiore and the Baptistry of St. John, the tower is one of the showpieces of Florentine Gothic architecture with its design by Giotto, its rich sculptural decorations and its polychrome marble encrustations.

The slender structure is square in plan with 14.45 metre (47.41 ft) sides. It is 84.7 metres (277.9 ft) tall and has polygonal buttresses at each corner. The tower is divided horizontally into five stages.

== History ==
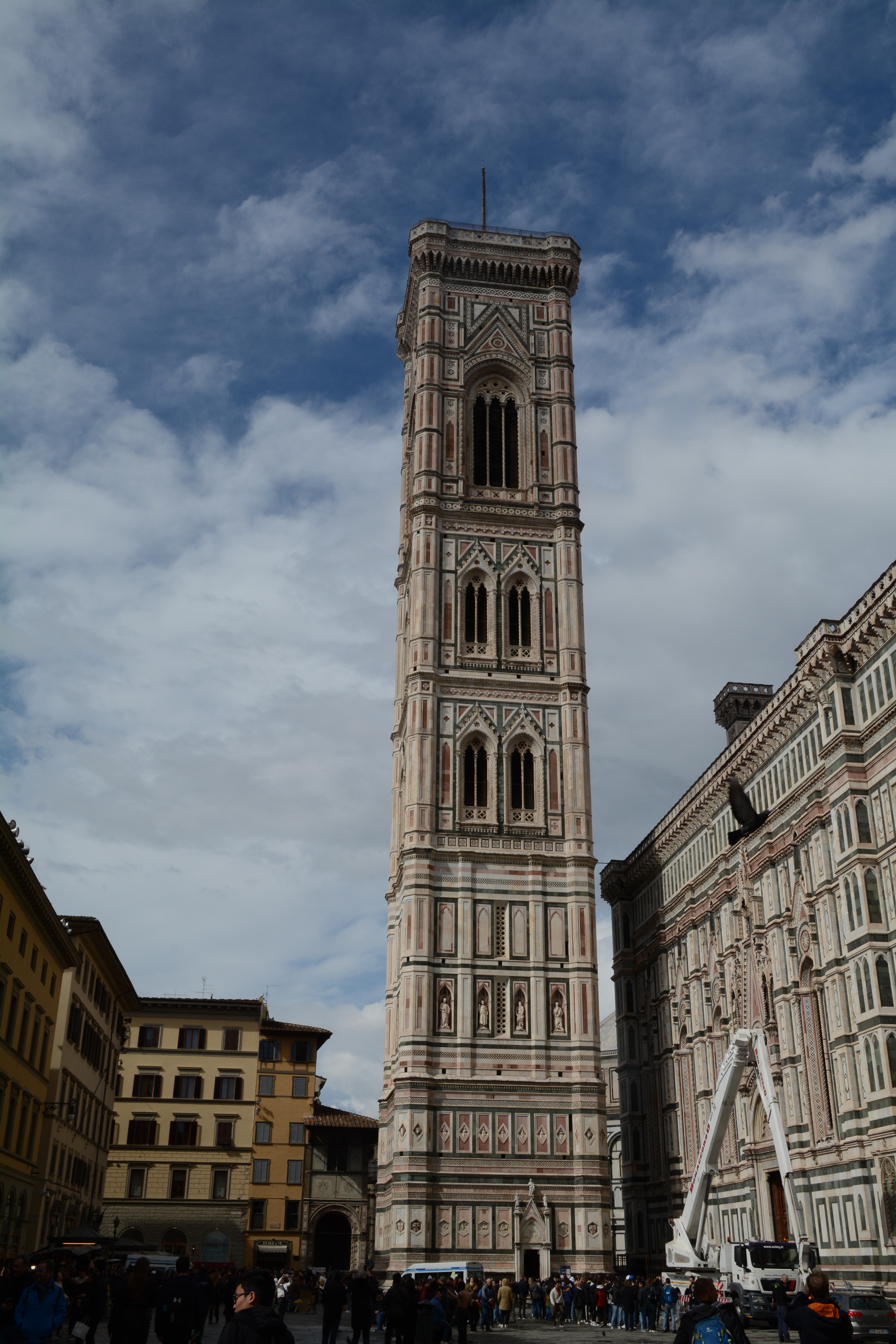
View of the bell tower from the east

On the death of Arnolfo di Cambio in 1302, the first Master of the Works of the Cathedral, and after an interruption of more than thirty years, the celebrated painter Giotto di Bondone was nominated as his successor in 1334. At that time he was 67 years old. Giotto concentrated his energy on the design and construction of a campanile for the cathedral. He had become an eminent architect, thanks to the growing autonomy of the architect-designer in relation to the craftsmen since the first half of the 13th century. The first stone was laid on 19 July 1334. His design was in harmony with the polychromy of the cathedral, as applied by Arnolfo di Cambio, giving the tower a view as if it were painted. In his design, he also applied chiaroscuro and some form of perspective instead of a strict linear drawing of the campanile. And instead of a filigree skeleton of a gothic building, he applied a surface of coloured marble in geometric patterns.

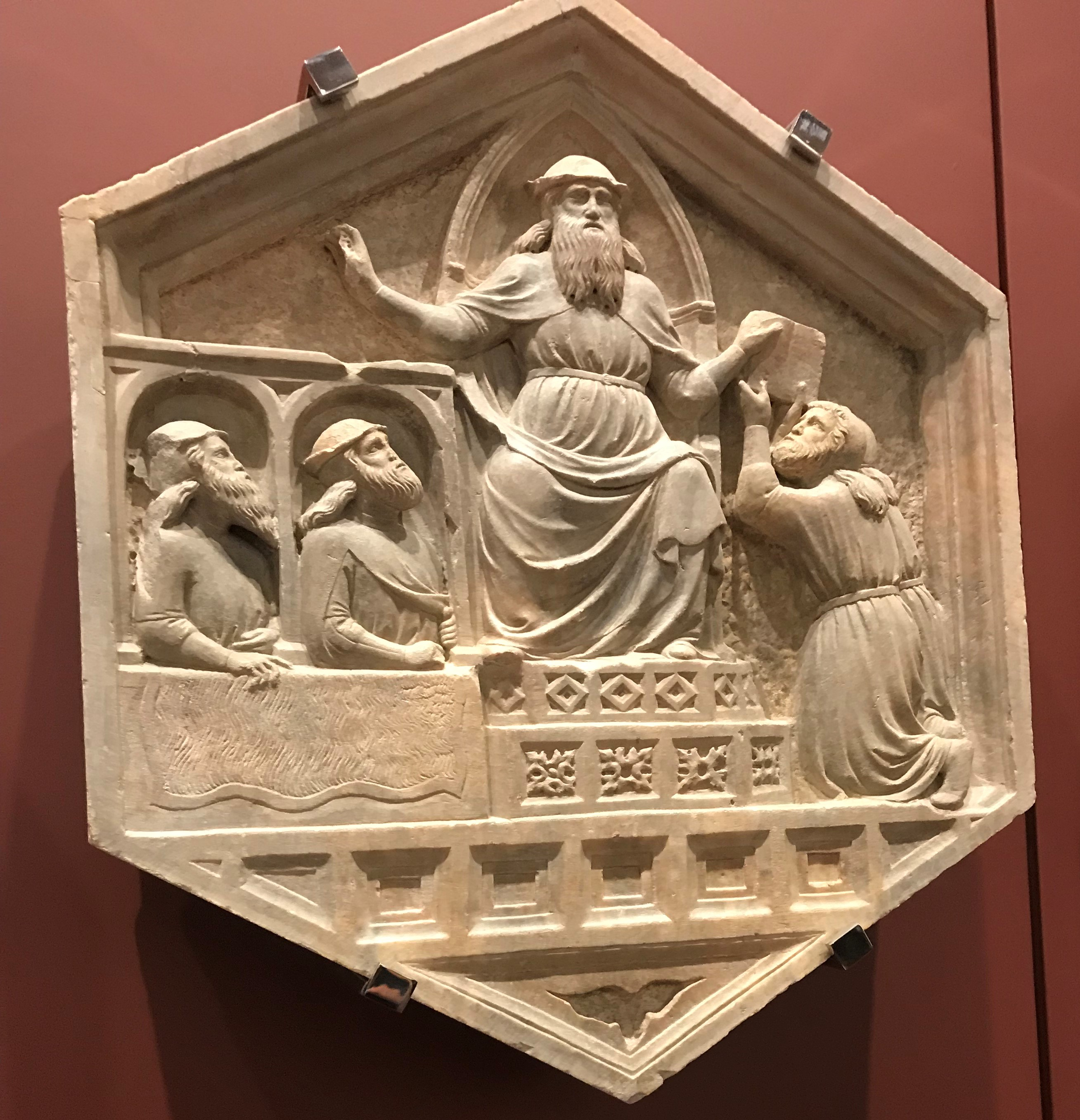
Original hexagonal panel depicting jurisprudence.

When he died in 1337, he had only finished the lower floor with its marble external revetment: geometric patterns of white marble from Carrara, green marble from Prato and red marble from Siena. This lower floor is decorated on three sides with bas-reliefs in hexagonal panels, seven on each side. When the entrance door was enlarged in 1348, two panels were moved to the empty northern side and only much later, five more panels were commissioned from Luca della Robbia in 1437. The number "seven" has a special meaning in Biblical sense: it symbolizes human perfectibility.

It is difficult to attribute artistic paternity to these panels. Some may be by Giotto himself, the others by Andrea Pisano (or their workshops).

Through this work, Giotto has become, together with Brunelleschi (dome of the cathedral of Florence) and Alberti (with his treatise De re aedificatoria, 1450), one of the founding fathers of Italian Renaissance architecture.

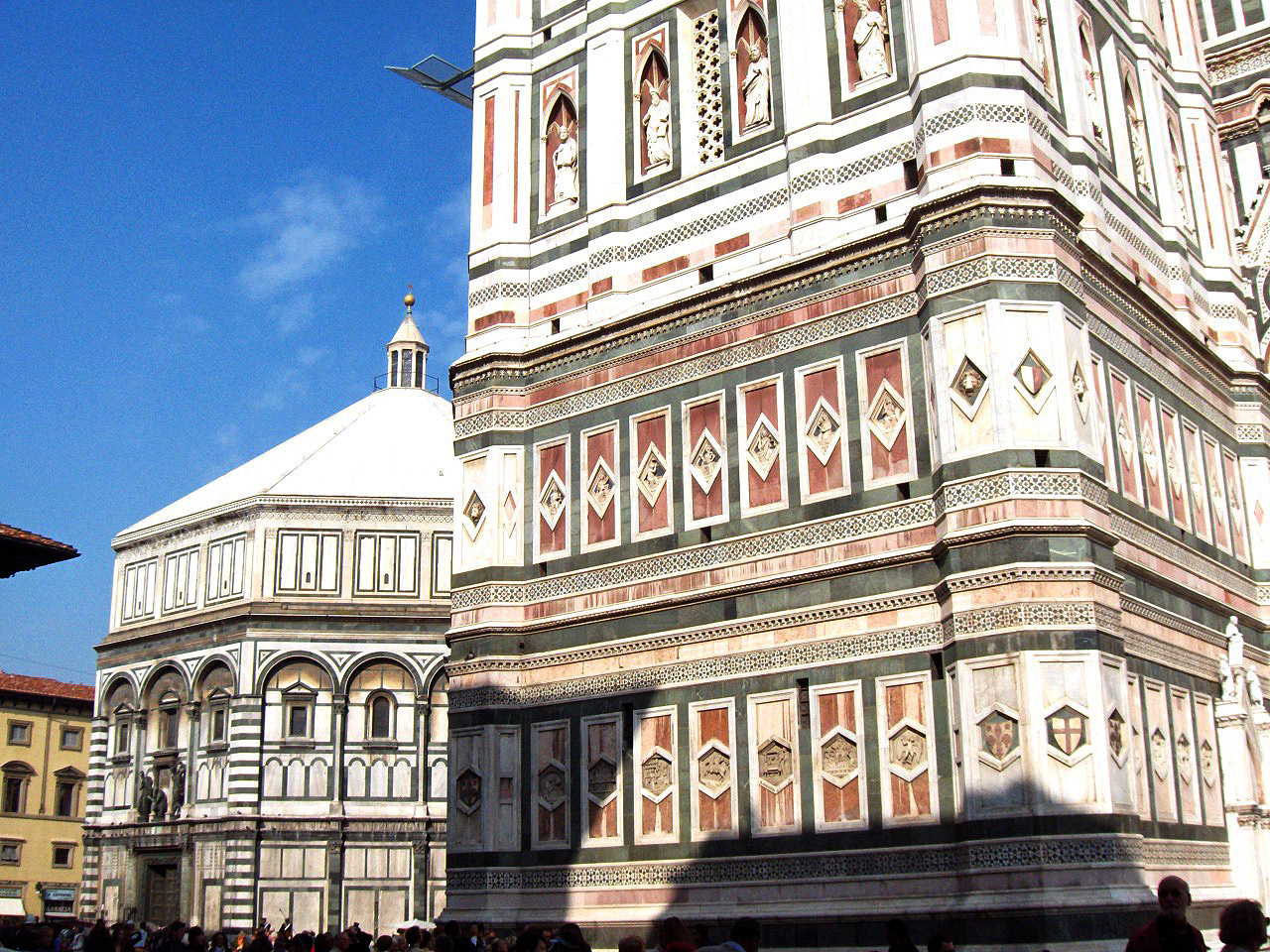
The lower levels with the hexagonal panels, lozenges and statues.

Giotto was succeeded as Master of the Works in 1343 by Andrea Pisano, famous already for the South Doors of the Baptistery. He continued the construction of the bell tower, scrupulously following Giotto's design. He added, above the lower level of Giotto, a second fascia, this time decorated with lozenge-shaped panels (1347–1341). He built two more levels, with four niches on each side and each level, but the second row of niches are empty. Construction came to a halt in 1348, year of the disastrous Black Death.

Pisano was replaced in his turn by Francesco Talenti who built the top three levels, with the large windows, completing the bell tower in 1359. He did not build the spire designed by Giotto, thus lowering the designed height of 122 metres (400 ft) to 84.7 metres (277.9 ft). The top, with its scenic panorama of Florence and the surrounding hills, can be reached by climbing 414 steps.

== Works of art ==
All the present works of art in the campanile are copies. The originals were removed between 1965 and 1967 and are now on display in the Museo dell'Opera del Duomo, behind the cathedral.

=== The hexagonal panels ===
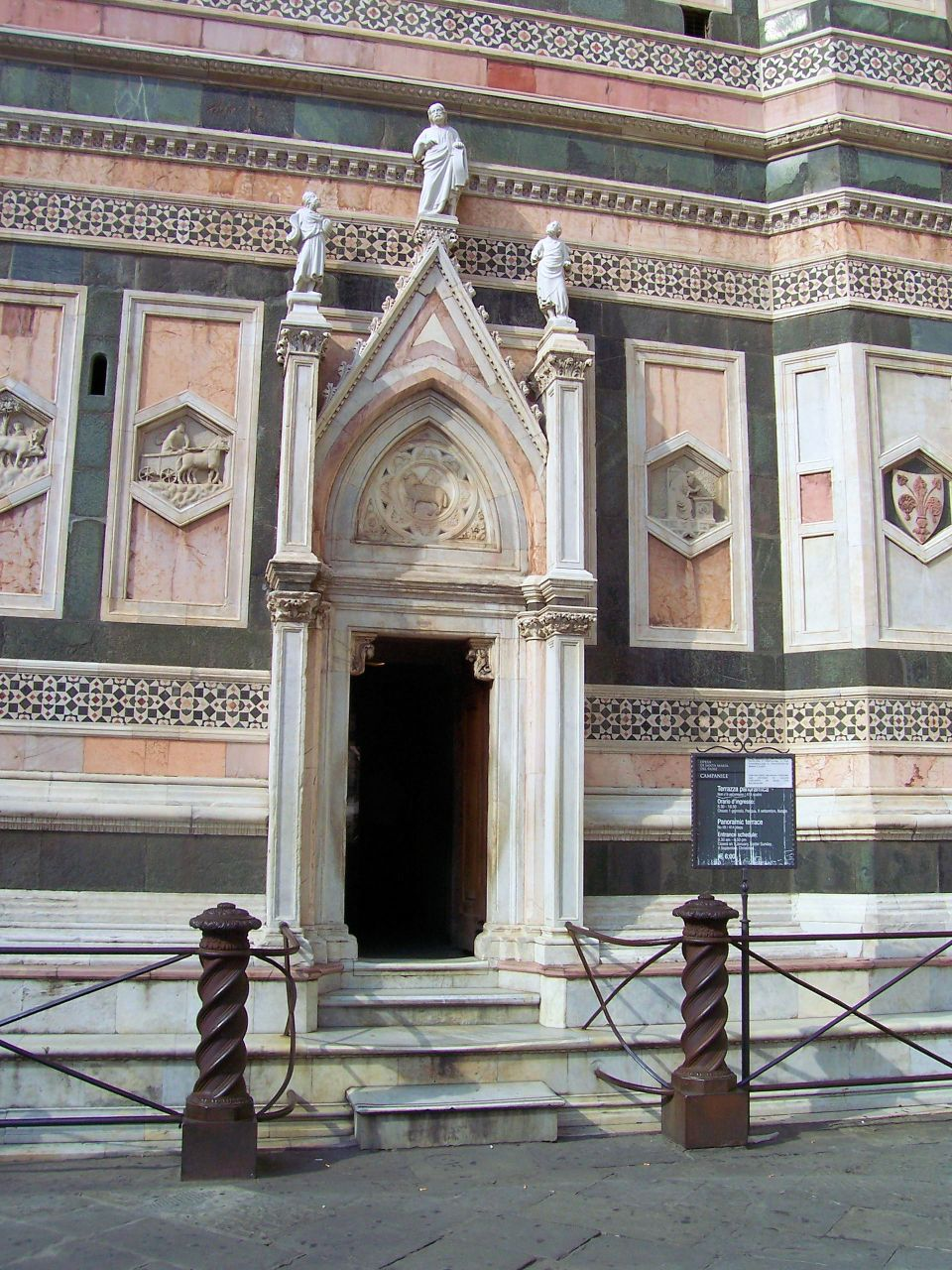
The hexagonal panels on the east side. From left to right: Agriculture, Art of festivals and Architecture.

Relief on the Campanile representing Medicine, depicting the practice of uroscopy.

The hexagonal panels on the lower level depict the history of mankind, inspired by Genesis, starting with on the west side:

- The creation of man and woman: Creation of Adam, Creation of Eve, Labours of our first parents; Lorenzo Ghiberti claimed to have seen clay models of the "first two" works of creation fashioned by Giotto.
- The beginnings of "mechanical arts" and "creative arts" (according to the Bible): Jabal (animal husbandry), Jubal (music, harp and organ), Tubalcain (first blacksmith), Noah (first farmer). This series continues on the south side and the east side of the campanile.

The Genesis panels are attributed to Andrea Pisano, except "Jubal" to Nino Pisano and "Tubalcain" to an assistant of Andrea Pisano.

The seven hexagonal panels on the south side show us Gionitus (Astronomy), the Art of Building, Medicine, Hunting, Wool-working, Phoroneus (Legislation), Daedalus (flight). They are again attributed to Andrea Pisano, except Gionitus and the Art of Building to his workshop, and Medicine and Phoroneus to Nino Pisano.

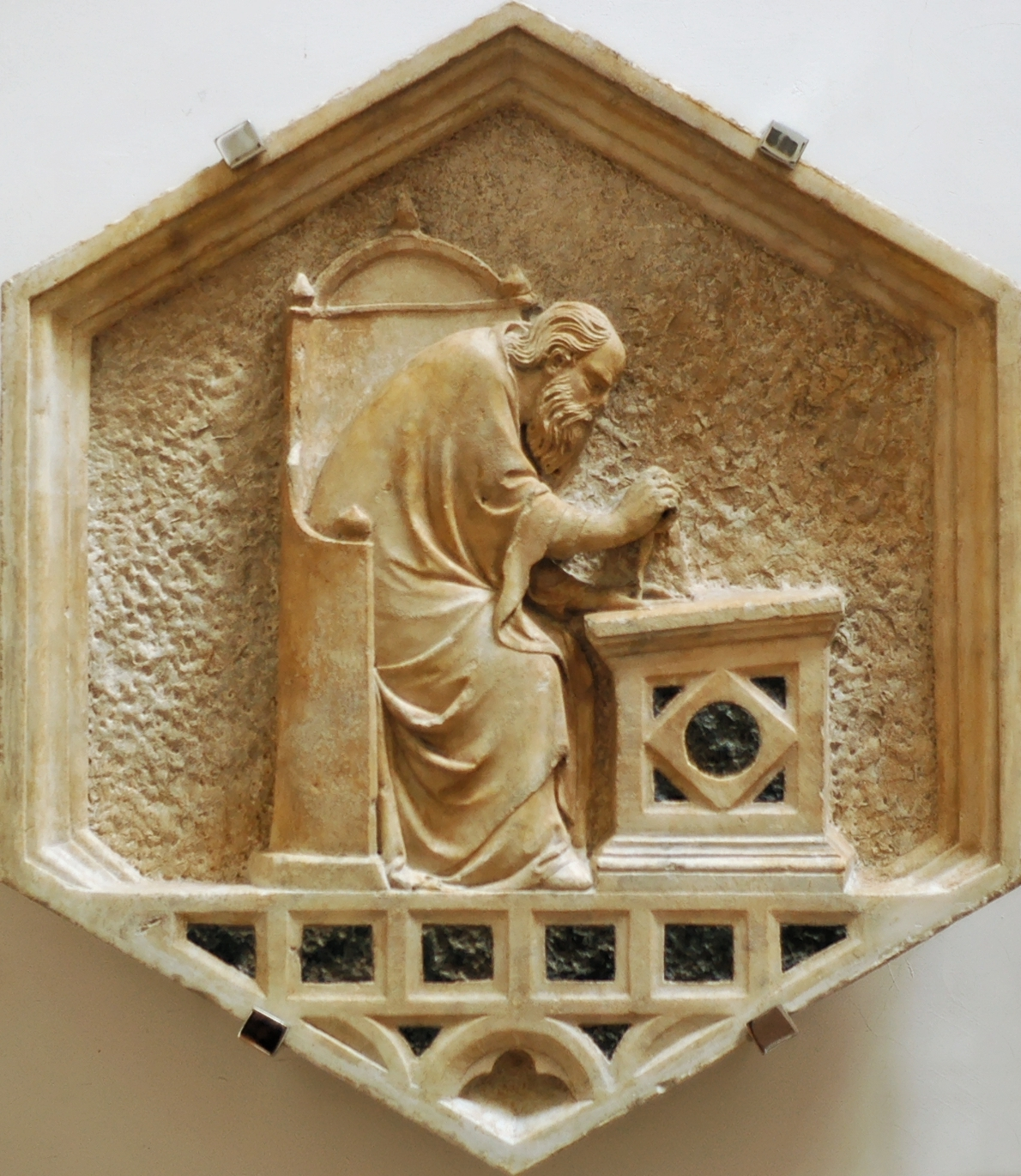
"Euclid", by Nino Pisano, now in the Duomo's Museum.

The east side only contains five panels, because of the entrance door. They depict the 'liberal arts': Navigation, Social Justice, Agriculture, Art of festivals and Euclid (architecture). The first three panels are attributed to Andrea Pisano, while the last two to Nino Pisano. "The Madonna and Child" in the lunette and the "Two Prophets and the Redeemer" on top of the gable above the entrance door, are both attributed to Andrea Pisano.

The north side hexagonal panels depict: Sculpture, Phidias (both moved to this side from the east side in 1347–1348), Painting, Harmony, Grammar, Logic and Dialectic (represented by Plato and Aristotle), Music and Poetry (represented by Orpheus), Geometry and Arithmetic (represented by Euclid and Pythagoras). The first panel is attributed to Andrea Pisano, the second to Nino Pisano, the others to Luca della Robbia. The last five panels were added after removal of the raised passageway between the campanile and the cathedral.

=== The lozenges ===
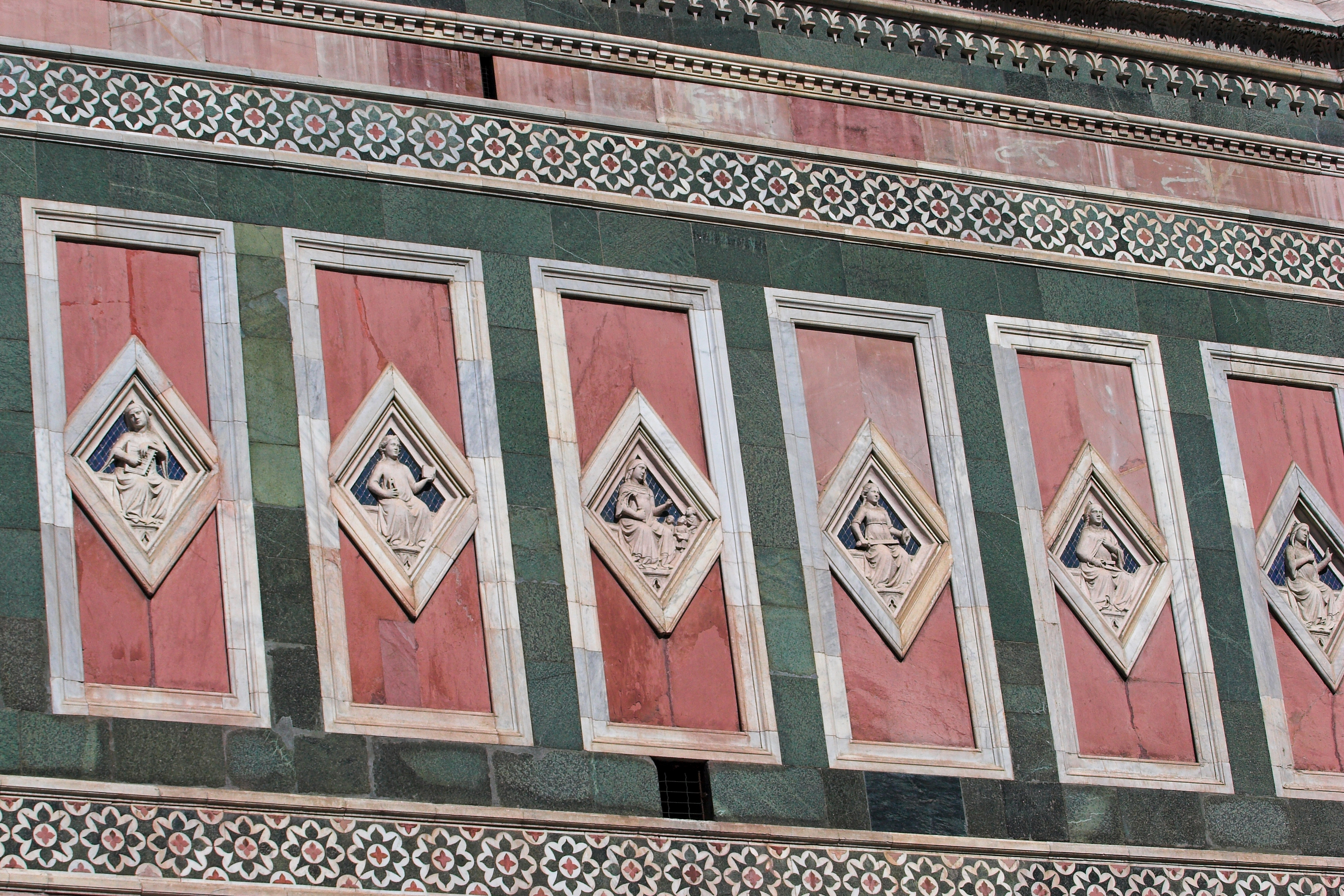
Lozenges of north side.

The lozenges, on the next level, already show a different style: the marble figures stand out on a background of blue majolica. These allegorical representations are almost all attributed to Andrea Pisano or his school:

- West side: The Planets — Saturn, Jupiter, Mars, the Sun, Venus, Mercury, the Moon. (Venus and Mercury are attributed to Nino Pisano).
- South side: The three Theological and four Cardinal Virtues — Faith, Charity, Hope, Prudence, Justice, Temperance, Fortitude (Faith is attributed to Gino Micheli da Castello).
- East side: the seven "Liberal Arts" — Astronomy, Music, Geometry, Grammar, Rhetoric, Logic, and Arithmetic. (Geometry and Rhetoric are attributed to Andrea Pisano; the others, except Astronomy, are attributed to Gino Micheli da Castello).
- North side: the Seven Sacraments (represented realistically and not allegorically) — Baptism, Confession, Matrimony, Holy Order, Confirmation, the Eucharist, and the Extreme Unction. They are all attributed to Maso di Banco, except Matrimony, attributed to Gino Micheli da Castello.

=== The statues in the niches ===
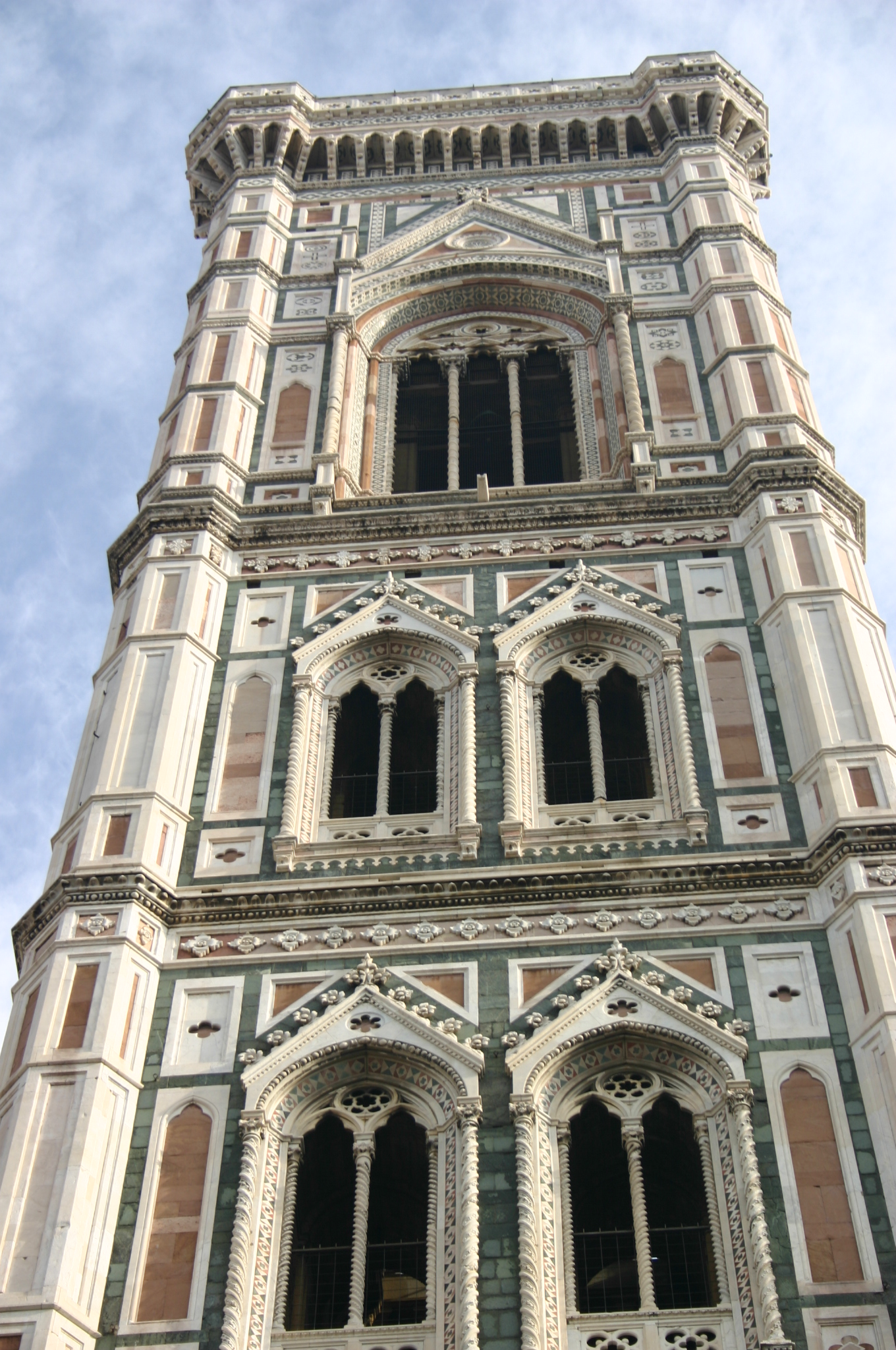

View from the bell tower (video)

On the next level on each side there are four statues in niches. They have been sculpted in different periods:

- The four statues on the west side were sculpted by Andrea Pisano and date from 1343. These Gothic statues are rather high-reliefs, left unfinished at the back. They represent the Tiburtine Sibyl, David, Solomon and the Erythraean Sibyl.
- The four Prophets on the south side are already more classical in style and date between 1334 and 1341. The statue of Moses and the fourth statue are attributed to Maso di Banco.
- The four Prophets and Patriarchs on the east side date from between 1408 and 1421: the beardless Prophets by Donatello (probably a portrait of his friend, the architect Filippo Brunelleschi), the Bearded Prophet (perhaps by Nanni di Bartolo), Abraham and Isaac (by Donatello and Nanni di Bartolo) and Il Pensatore (the thinker) (by Donatello).
- The four statues on the north side were added between 1420 and 1435: Prophet (probably by Nanni di Bartolo, however signed by Donatello), Habacuc (a masterpiece of Donatello, a tormented and emaciated prophet, portraying Giovanni Chiericini, an enemy of the Medicis), Jeremias (by Donatello, portraying Francesco Soderini, another enemy of the Medicis), Abdias (by Nanni di Bartolo).

=== The three top levels ===
These levels were built by Francesco Talenti, Master of the Works from 1348 to 1359. Each level is larger than the lower one and extends beyond it in every dimension such that their difference in size exactly counters the effect of perspective. As a result, the top three levels of the tower, when seen from below, look exactly equal in size. The vertical windows open up the walls, a motif borrowed from the Siena campanile. Instead of a spire, Talenti built a large projecting terrace.

The reliefs, statues and decoration make a coherent whole when interpreted in terms of medieval scholastic philosophy.

== The bells ==
In Giotto's campanile there are seven bells:

No.	Name	Year of casting	Founder	Diameter (mm)	Weight (kg)	Note
1	Campanone	1705	Antonio Petri, Florence	2000	5385	A2
2	La Misericordia	1808	Carlo Moreni	1520	~2100	C3
3	Apostolica	1957	Fonderia Barigozzi	1250	1200	D3
4	Annunziata	1956	Fonderia Barigozzi	1150	856.5	E3
5	Mater Dei	1956	Fonderia Barigozzi	950	481.3	G3
6	L'Assunta	1956	Fonderia Barigozzi	850	339.6	A3
7	L'Immacolata	1956	Fonderia Barigozzi	750	237.8	B3
