= Philip Bevilacqua =

American researcher

Philip (Phil) C. Bevilacqua is a biological chemist. He was born on September 7, 1965, in North Collins, NY. He currently serves as a distinguished professor at the Pennsylvania State University in State College, PA. In 2009, he was elected a Fellow of the American Association for Advancement of Science (AAAS)

== Education ==
- B.S., John Carroll University, 1987
- Ph.D., University of Rochester, 1993
- Postdoctoral fellow, University of Colorado, Boulder, 1993–97

== Academic work ==
After being mentored by Tom Cech, Bevilacqua became interested in the folding of RNA and its interactions with chemistry. His research looks at how RNA affects biological processes. He studies viral replication in humans and the responses to abiotic stresses in plants. Some approaches that his lab uses are rapid mixing kinetics, fluorescence spectroscopy, UV melting, site-directed mutagenesis, combinatorial selection of RNA (or SELEX), Raman spectroscopy, NMR, SAXS, and X-ray crystallography.
