= Giovanna Zangrandi =

Giovanna Zangrandi, born with the name of Alma Bevilacqua (1910–1988), was an Italian novelist and Resistance fighter.

== Works ==
- Leggende delle Dolomiti (Legends of the Dolomites) (1950)
- I Brusaz (The Brusaz Family) (1954)
- Orsola nelle stagioni (Ursula in the Different Seasons) (1957)
- Il campo rosso (The Red Field) (1959)
- Tre signore (Three Ladies) (1960)
- I giorni veri, 1943–45 (The Real Days, 1943–45) (1963) ISBN 9788880120919
- Anni con Attila (Years with Attila) (1966)
- Il diario di Chiara (Chiara's Diary) (1972)

== Sources ==
- Bloomsbury Guide to Women's Literature
