= Harold Drinkwater =

English physician

Harold Drinkwater FRSE (1855 – 11 July 1925) was an English physician. He was usually referred to simply as Harry Drinkwater. He did much research into hereditary diseases but is largely remembered as an amateur botanist and exemplary artist of botanical subjects, creating over 200 exquisite plant portraits largely held by museums in Wales.

His work is typically finely honed pastel on a plain grey background. The combination of draughtsmanship and shadowing give all his work a very strong 3-dimensional quality, whilst also being of extreme beauty.

== Life ==
He was born in Northwich in Cheshire the son of James Frederick Drinkwater (b.1822) and his wife Hannah Mather (b.1823).

Upon qualifying as a doctor in 1890 he moved to Wrexham and spent all of his working life there as a GP.

In 1908 he was elected a Fellow of the Royal Society of Edinburgh. His proposers were Daniel John Cunningham, James Cossar Ewart, James Geikie and Cargill Gilston Knott. Of the 500 or so plant pictures he created between 1903 and 1915, covering the majority of species in north Wales, over 200 were exhibited in the 1912 National Eisteddfod in Wrexham.

He died in Wrexham on 11 July 1925.

== Family ==
In 1908 he married Katherine Rosebery Jay (b.1855)
