= Giovanni Ambrogio Bevilacqua =

Italian painter

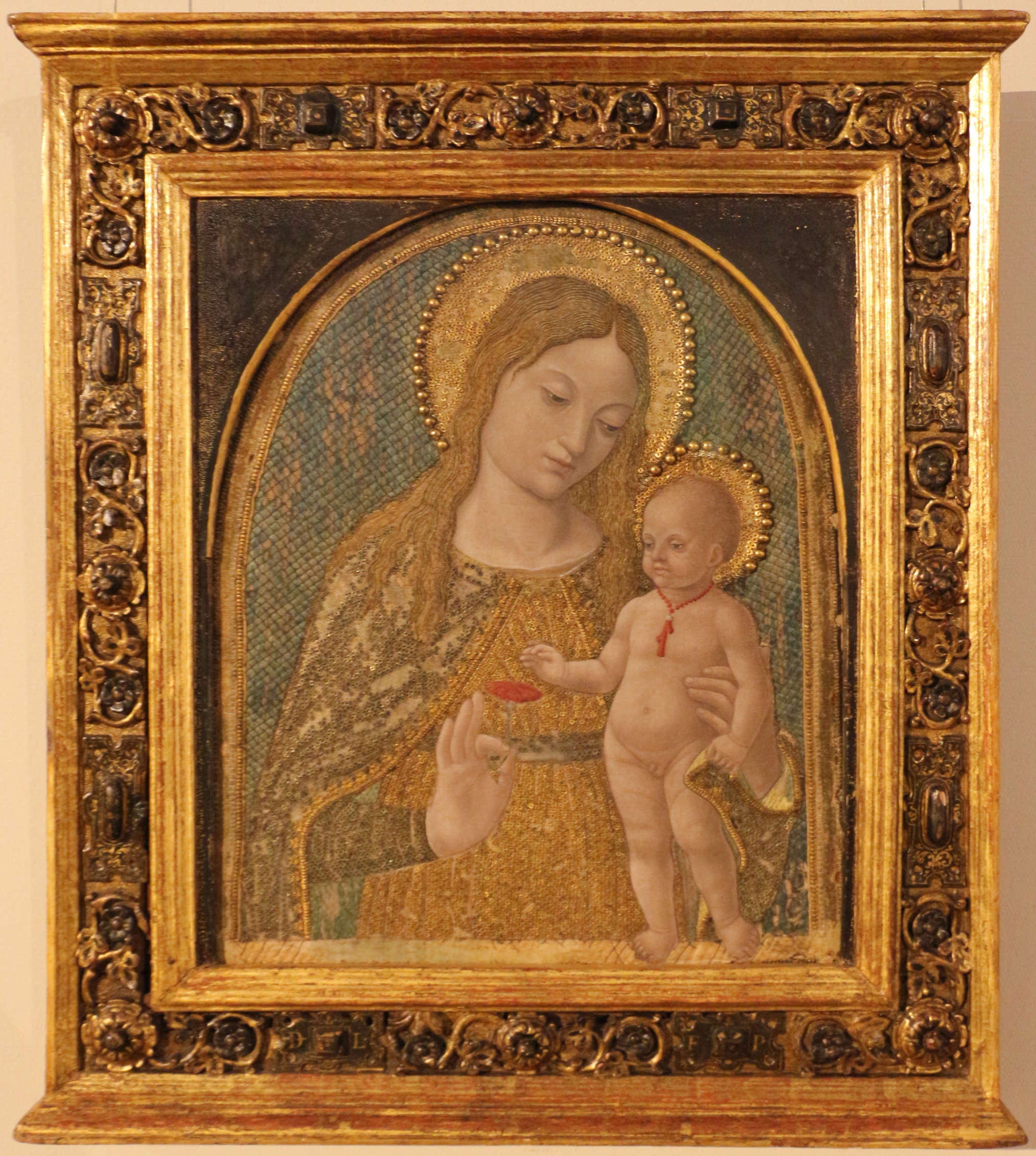
Madonna and Child, 1495–1499, Castello Sforzesco, Milan

Giovanni Ambrogio Bevilacqua, also known as il Liberale Bevilacqua (active by 1481 to at least 1512) was an Italian painter active in Lombardy in a late-medieval or early Renaissance style. He was a pupil of Vincenzo Foppa of Milan.

== Biography ==
Bevilacqua was apparently born in Milan to a carpenter named Pietro. By 1481, he was noted under the patronage of Duke Francesco Sforza. He signed in 1485 a fresco depicting Saints Roch, Sebastian, and Christopher and perhaps also completed a Madonna and Saints with Donors for the parish church of Landriano.

== Works ==
- Madonna and Child, Museo Bagatti Valsecchi of Milan,
- Madonna Piccinella, Sforza Castle Pinacoteca of Milan
- Madonna with Child, St Peter Martyr, King David, and Donor, Pinacoteca Brera, Milan
- Castello Visconteo (Pavia)
- Metropolitan Museum of New York,
- National Museum of Art of Luxembourg
- Madonna and Child with St John the Baptist, St Bernard of Clairveaux and a donor, Accademia Carrara in Bergamo,
- Waddesdon Manor in England
