= Tessiture Luigi Bevilacqua =

Italian textile company

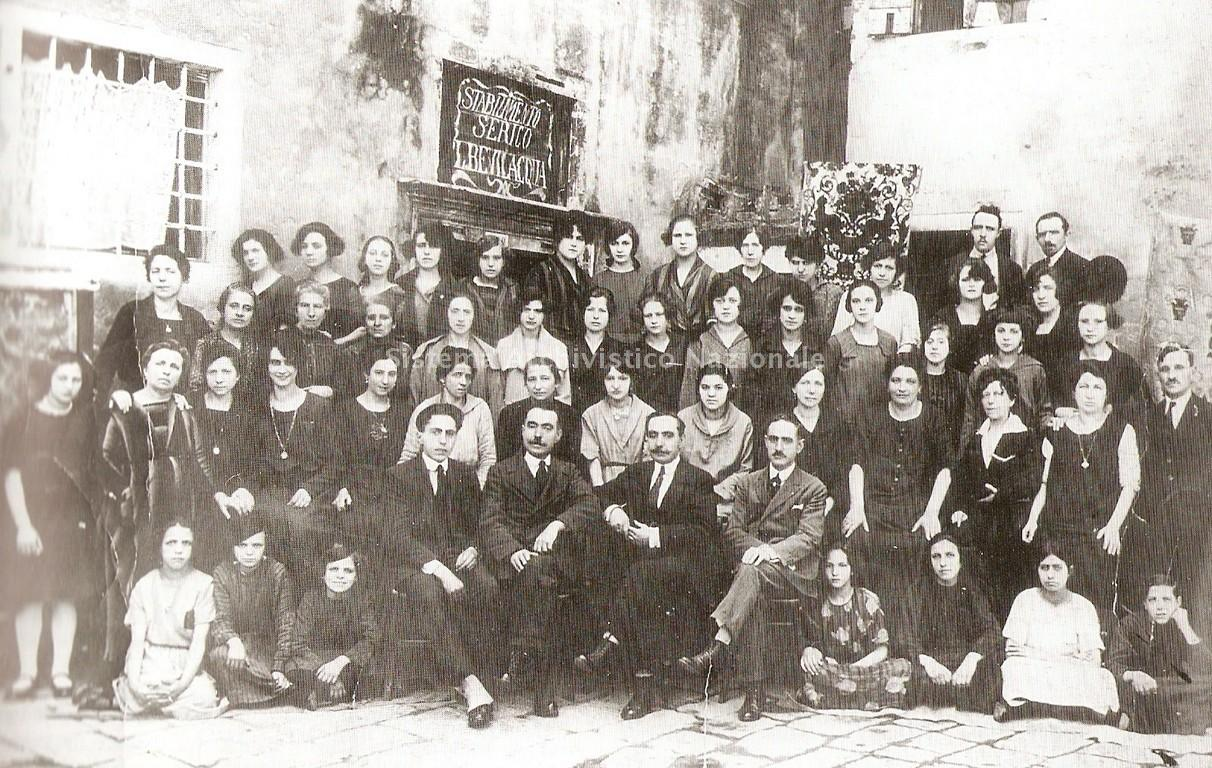

Tessiture Luigi Bevilacqua is a textile company incorporated in Venice in 1875—originally in the sestiere of Castello. The company deals primarily with the production of velvet, lampas, damask, and satin on 17th century looms.

== History ==
=== Origins ===
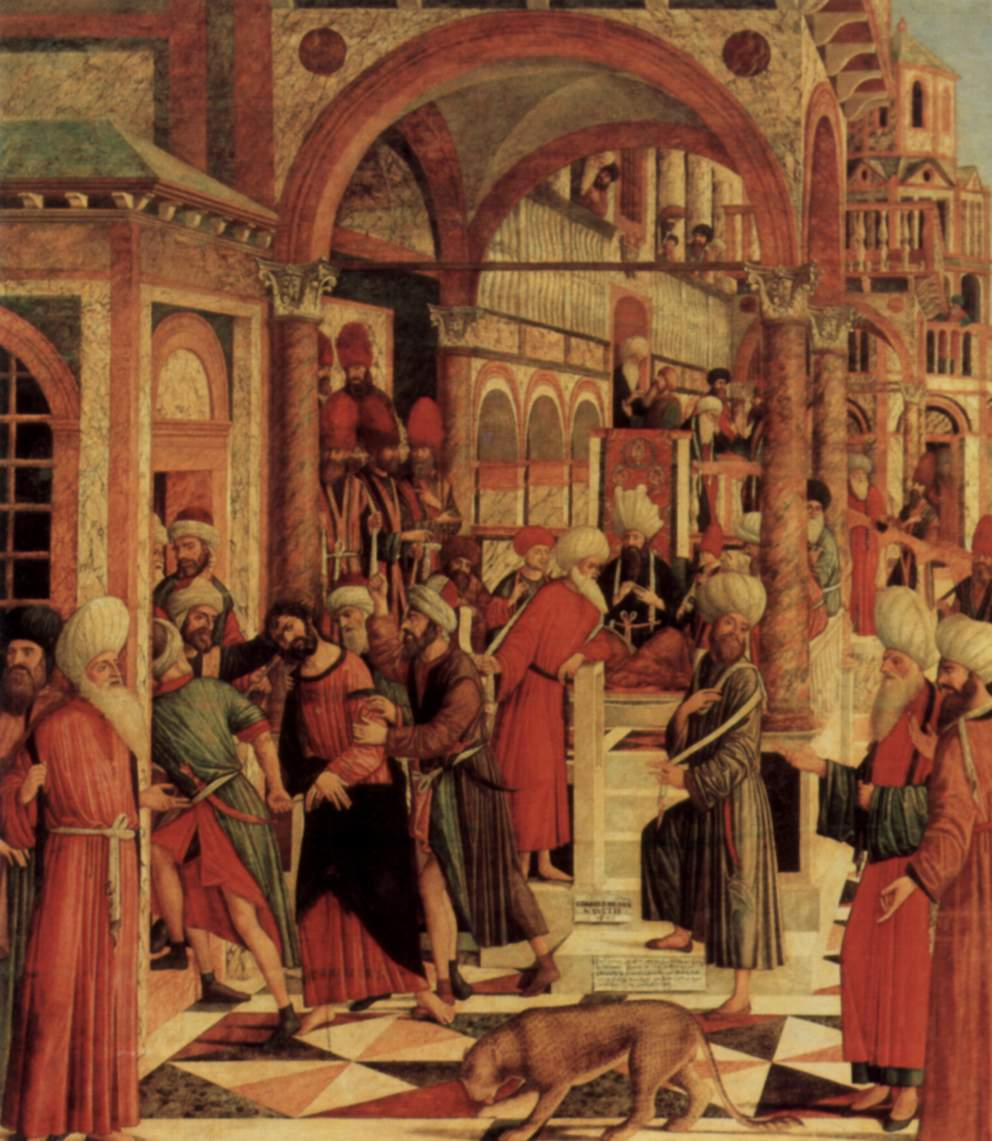
Giovanni di Niccolò Mansueti's San Marco trascinato alla Sinagoga, 1499; Liechtenstein. On the bottom right, there is a plaque in which the name Bevilacqua is found.

The first evidence of the involvement of the Bevilacqua family in the production of silks date back to 1499. It wasn't until 1875, however, that the textile production was incorporated into a company under Luigi Bevilacqua (1844–1898).
