= Mattia Bevilacqua =

Italian cyclist (born 1998)

Personal information
- Born: 17 June 1998 (age 28) Livorno, Italy

Cycling career
- Sport: Cycling
- Current team: Retired
- Discipline: Road
- Role: Rider

Amateur teams
- 2017–2018: Hopplà–Petroli Firenze
- 2019: Team Franco Ballerini
- 2019: Neri Sottoli–Selle Italia–KTM (stagiaire)

Professional team
- 2020–2021: Vini Zabù–KTM

Mattia Bevilacqua (born 17 June 1998) is an Italian former racing cyclist, who competed professionally for UCI ProTeam Vini Zabù from 2020 to 2021.

== Major results ==
2016
1st Road race, National Junior Road Championships
2nd Trofeo Citta di Loano
2017
10th Gran Premio Industrie del Marmo
2018
5th Trofeo Città di San Vendemiano
8th Trofeo Piva
9th Trofeo Edil C
2019
10th Trofeo Edil C
