= Turone da Verona =

Italian painter

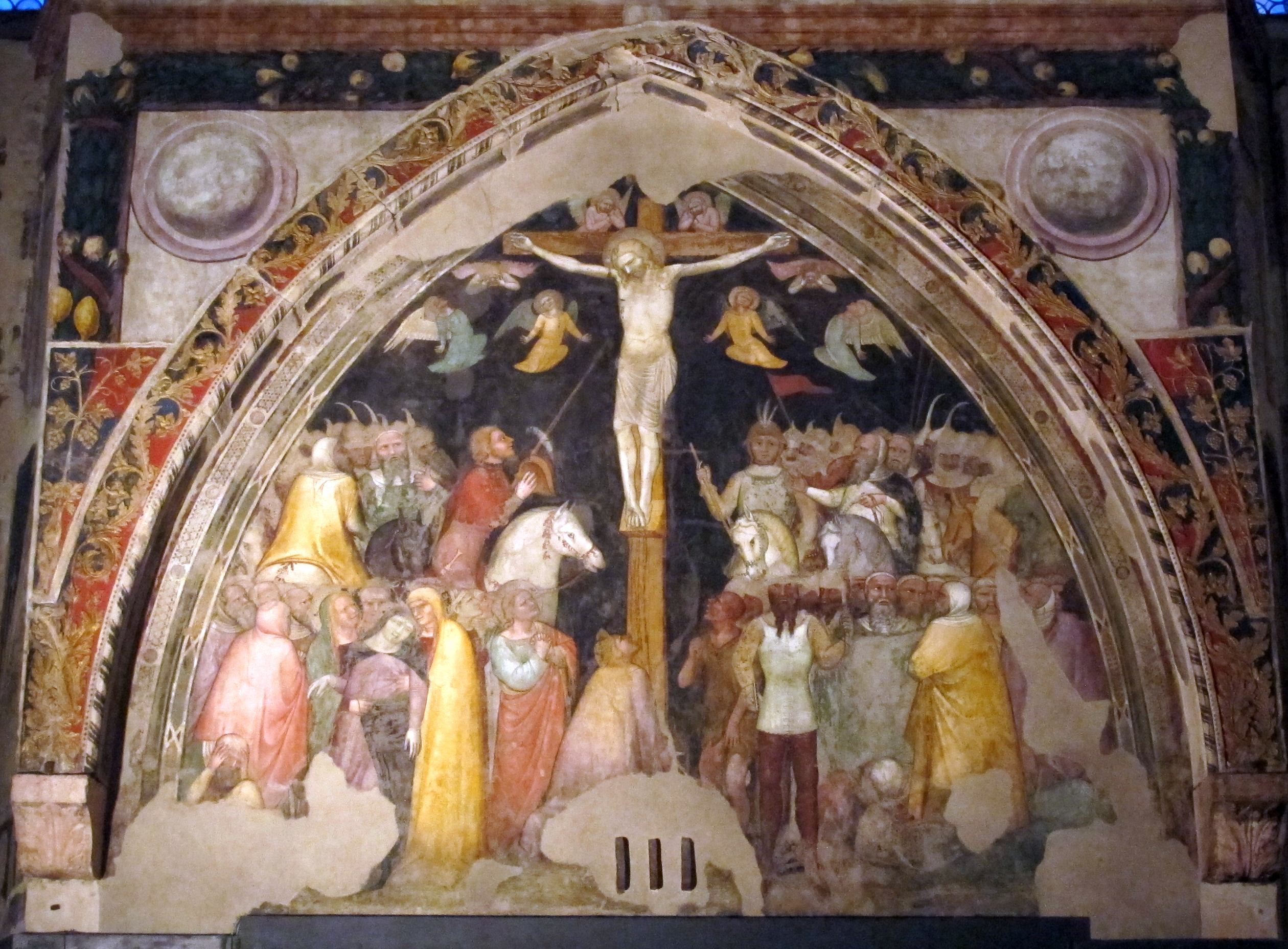
The Crucifixion of San Fermo in Verona

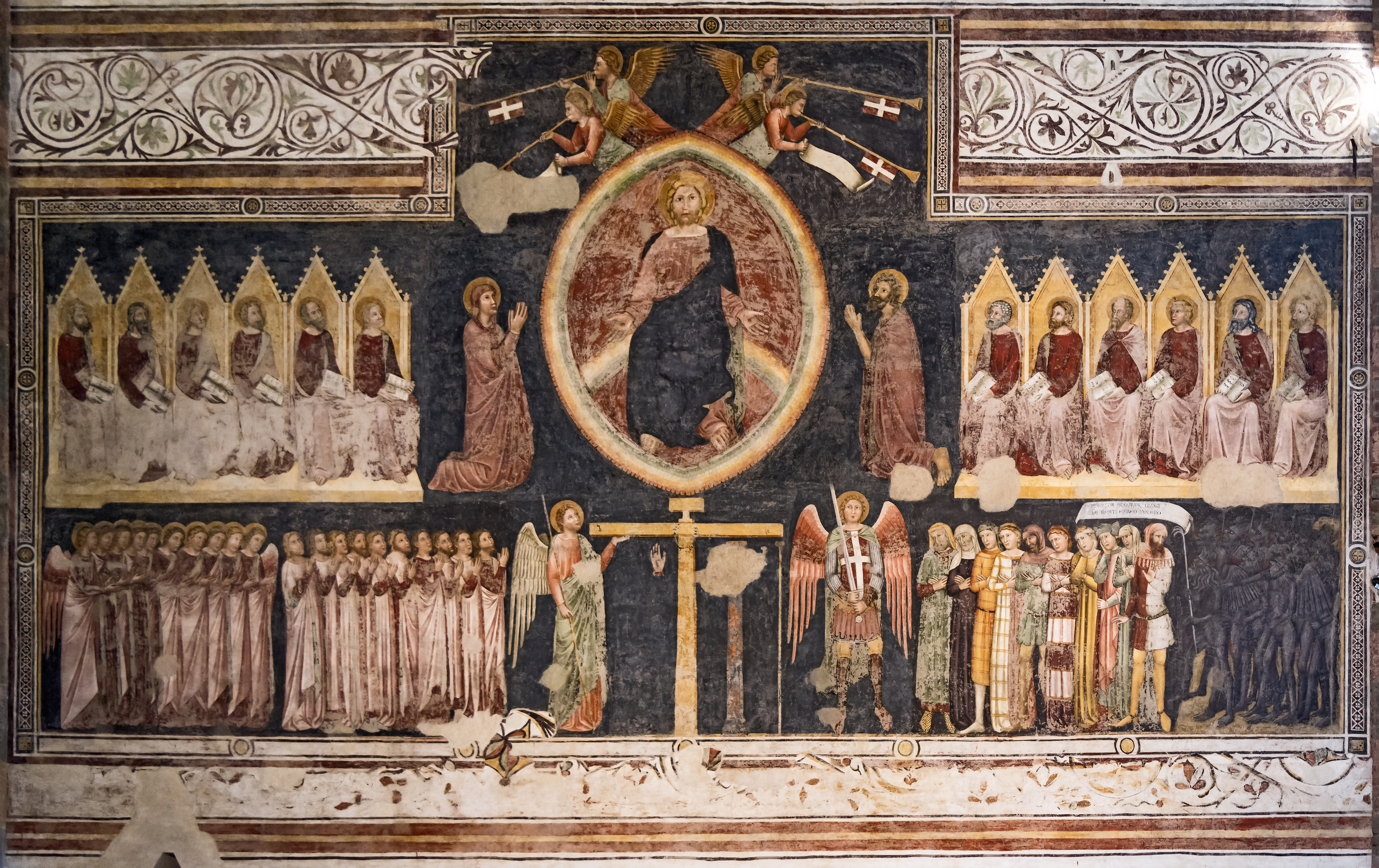
Last Judgment Santa Anastasia (Verona)

Turone (Note: He is noted under multiple names, Turo, Turone, Turone di Maxio, Turone di Maxio da Camenago, and Turone da Verona are known.) (c. 1356 – c. 1390) (Note: The dates of birth and death of this painter active in Verona during the second half of the fourteenth century and documented from 1356 to 1387 are unknown.) was an Italian architect, painter and illuminator, active in the Veronese area in the second half of the 14th century.

== Life ==
Little is known about Turone da Verona's early life. His exact date of birth is unknown. He was born in Milan or Verona, the information on his human and artistic life is very limited and all in the Veronese area. (Note: Finding himself in the series that Biancolini gives us among the families of Verona, who from the years 1405 to 1439 made up the Council of this city, also named a Turone family, it removes any doubt about the true homeland of this architect.) A document dated 1356 mentions it as "Turonem quondam domini Maxii de Camenago diocexis Mediolanensis et nunc habitantem Verone", (Note: From Latin: "Turo, formerly of the diocese of Milan and now inhabiting Verone.") indicating its Lombard origin and its recent move to the city; he is then registered as a witness in an act of 1360 relating to the convent of Santa Maria della Scala, and in another of 1387 no longer available, while from 1393 he is already dead.

In Turone's painting we can see an example of a Venetian-Padan reworking of the Giotto lesson, which in Veneto above all – but only marginally in Venice – had a strong impact thanks to the extraordinary works of the Tuscan Master (the Scrovegni Chapel and those lost in the Basilica del Santo and the Palazzo della Ragione). A reworking that adds greater excitement and dramatization of the actions and a more decisive use of color to Giotto's perspective and volume. It was Altichiero da Zevio, probably Turone's pupil, who reached the apex of this pictorial approach.

Among the most significant works attributed to Turone is the fresco of a crucifixion on the counter-façade of the church of San Fermo Maggiore in Verona. Another site where Turone's work can be observed is the church of Santa Anastasia, in Verona. The rare works on wood that have come down to us attributable to Turone are found in the Veronese museum of Castelvecchio. Of Turone must also be mentioned the activity of miniaturist who once again in Verona has its greatest legacies. He is known to have been active in 1387. One work attributed to him is dated from 1360. (Note: Italian description of Mr. Zannandreis to this work: Di questo artefice, che intorno a cinque secoli era rimaso nella oblivione, nella soppressione de Monasteri si scoperse in quello della SS. Trinità una tavola, che ora conservasi in questa Comunale Pinacoteca. Quest ancona è ripartita in cinque uguali nicchie messe ad oro, e di gotico stile, ove nel mezzo avvi la SS. Triade, e dai lati quattro santi in piccole figure; e sopra quella di mezzo in altra nicchia si vede in figure ancora più piccole la coronazione di M.V. Appiedi vi sta scritto in carattere di que tempi: 'Opus Turoni' ed in un angolo 'MCCCLX.' English translation: This architect, who around five centuries had remained in the oblivion, in the suppression of the Monasteri he discovered himself in that of the SS. Trinità (Trinity) a panel, which is now preserved in this Municipal Pinacoteca (Art Gallery). This altarpiece is divided into five equal niches decorated with gold, and in a Gothic style, where the SS. Triad, and on the sides four saints in small figures; and above the middle one in another niche the coronation of M.V. On foot [bottom?] it is written in the font of those times: 'Opus Turoni' and in one corner 'MCCCLX (1360).')

== Works ==
- Holy Trinity among Saints Zeno, John the Baptist, Peter and Paul (1360), polyptych, Castelvecchio Museum, Verona
- Crucifixion, counter-façade of the Church of San Fermo Maggiore, Verona
- The last judgement San Anastasia Church, Verona
- Verona Museums

== Bibliography ==
- Cardini, Franco (2004). L'Italia medievale [Medieval Italy] (in Italian). Touring Editore. ISBN 978-88-365-3058-8.
- Cuppini, Maria Teresa (1966), Da Altichiero a Pisanello [From Altichiero to Pisanello] (in Italian)
- Piccoli, Fausta (2010). Altichiero e la pittura a Verona nella tarda età Scaligera [Altichiero and painting in Verona in the late Scaligera period]. Sommacampagna: Cierre Edizioni. ISBN 978-88-8314-551-3.
- Zannandreis, Diego (1891). Le vite dei pittori, scultori e architetti veronesi [The lives of Veronese painters, sculptors and architects] (in Italian). G. Franchini.
