= Charles A. Bevilacqua =

United States Navy Seabee

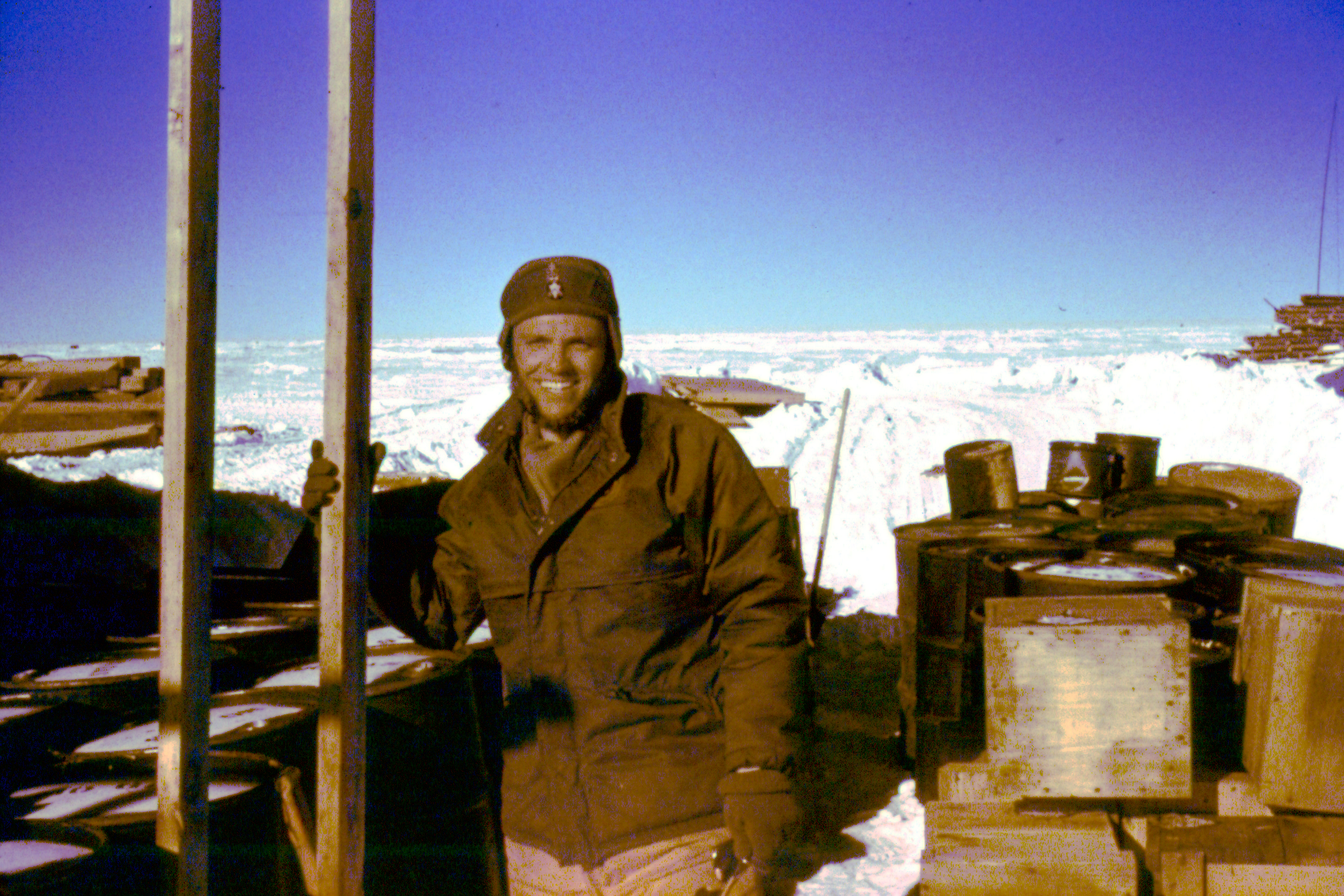
Charles A. Bevilacqua, head of the Seabees team that built the first permanent station at the South Pole. 1956 photo by Dick Prescott, NSF.

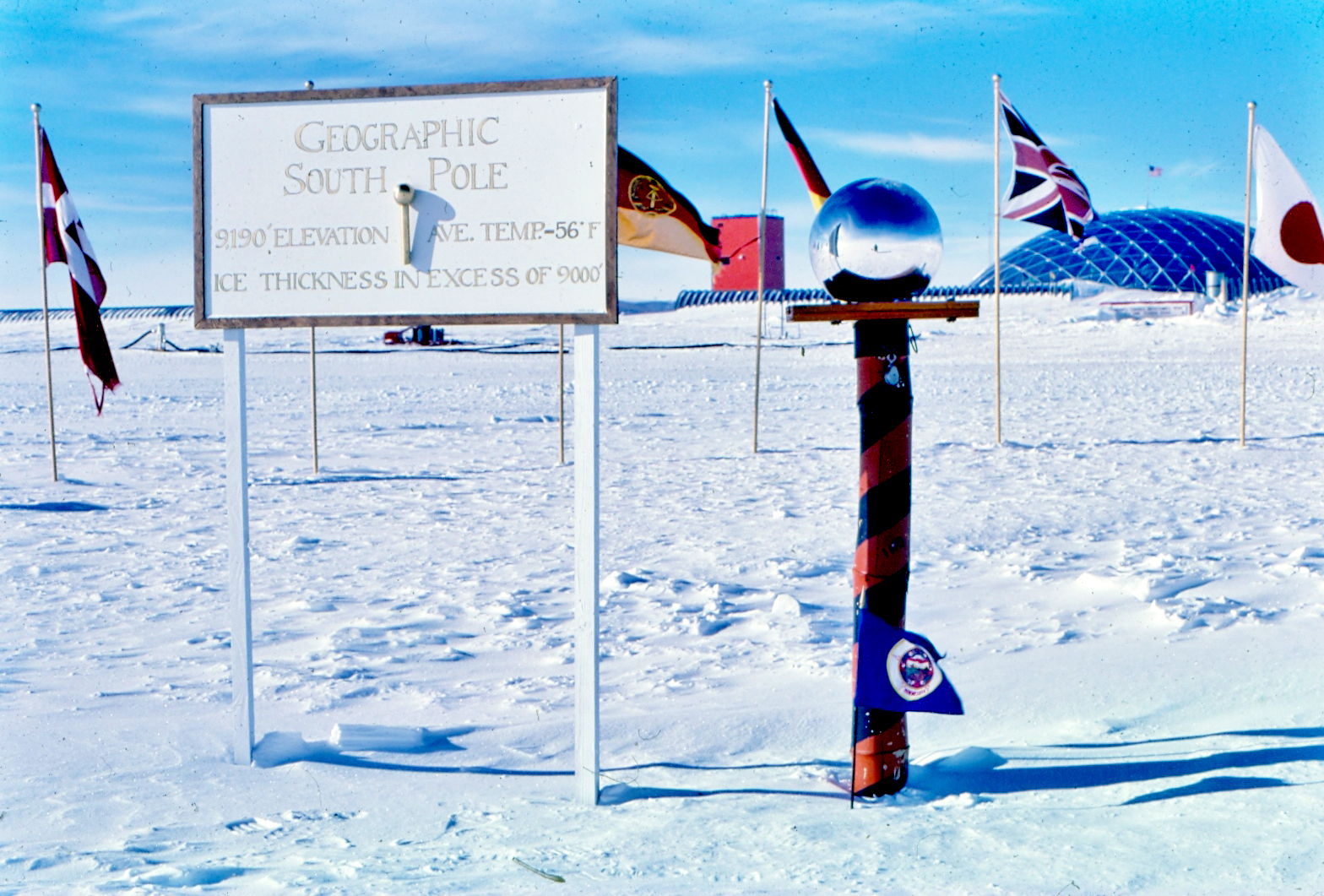
Ceremonial South Pole marker in 1980, painted orange and black by Bevilacqua in 1956

Charles A. Bevilacqua (June 8, 1930 – November 29, 2019) was a United States Navy Seabee who, during Operation Deep Freeze I, helped to build McMurdo Station and was then promoted to Chief Builder, in which role he led the building of Amundsen–Scott South Pole Station and the installation of the first South Pole "ceremonial pole", which he painted orange and black to honor his Woburn, Massachusetts, high school. He served with the Seabees construction battalions 1948–1978, including service in the Korean and Vietnam wars as well as Antarctica.

== Biography ==
Bevilacqua was born on June 8, 1930, in Woburn, Massachusetts, the son of Charles E. and Ann (Paris) Bevilacqua.

In 1948, he joined the Seabees, construction battalions of the United States Navy's Civil Engineer Corps, which had been set up during World War II. He joined the Seabees right after finishing high school, where he had done a vocational track on carpentry. After training, he worked with Seabees in Micronesia, the Marianas Islands, the Philippines, and, during the Korean War, in Korea.

In 1955, when Bevilacqua decided to volunteer for an opportunity for Seabees to work in Antarctica, he was a 26-year-old First Class Petty Officer. (Note: A "petty officer" in the Navy is a non-commissioned officer, with first, second, and third-class petty officers equivalent to the Army rankings of Staff Sergeant, Sergeant, and Corporal, respectively. The highest rank of petty officer is the Chief Petty Officer, equivalent to an Army Sergeant First Class.) Bevilacqua persisted despite being turned down at first, and eventually succeeded in being taken on as an expert in building Quonset huts.

Bevilacqua's journal records his experiences in the Antarctic, including the trip there on the USS Wyandot, which passed through the Panama Canal before arriving at McMurdo Sound on December 27, 1956.

According to the Los Angeles Times, Bevilacqua was "one of the first humans ever to step foot (sic) on the geologic South Pole". Together with 18 other Seabees, he parachuted to the site to establish a camp and identify the Pole so that it could be marked.

The expedition's scientific leader Paul Siple, in his 1959 book 90 Degrees South, described Bevilacqua as "especially likeable", noting his appearance as well as his role:

Bev sported a set of Irish-style black chin whiskers without a moustache that lent his appearance an extremely salty air ... Dressed in orange-yellowish windproof trousers and olive-drab windproof jacket and headgear, Bev led his team of men in leveling snow, putting down the snow sills, setting the trusses in place beneath the buildings that required them, laying down the floor, raising the sides, snapping in place roof trusses and covering the structures with the roof panels ... By December 6, Bev and his builders had already finished the garage-powerhouse shell and had begun work on the mess hall foundation.

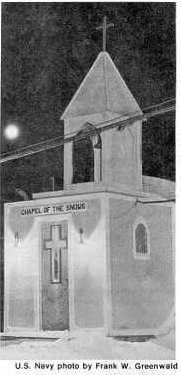
Chapel of the Snows (1956)

Bevilacqua made the altar for the original Chapel of the Snows. The building originated as a memorial site for US Navy Petty Office Richard Williams, who was killed early in the mission when his tractor broke through McMurdo's ice. The original plans for McMurdo did not include a chapel, but the building was slowly constructed by volunteers from gathered materials. The chapel was dedicated to "Our Lady of the Snows" in May, 1956. In 1996, when the chapel celebrated its 40th anniversary, Bevilacqua got the consent of the Williams family for the installation of a plaque that honors not only Williams but all the people who later died in Antarctica.

On December 14, 1956, Bevilacqua and his team erected a 15-foot (4.6 m) pole that remained in use as the "ceremonial South Pole" at least until 2018. The ceremonial pole was supposed to be painted with a red-and-white candy stripe, but Bevilacqua instead painted it orange and black, the colors of his Woburn high school football team. When questioned, he claimed that all other colors of paint had been frozen. The pole remained orange and black until 1980, when it was repainted to red and white. Bevilacqua also put up a sign nearby, "City Limits of Woburn", took pictures, and sent them to the local home newspaper.

He and his team then "wintered over" at the South Pole, the first people to do so.

After leaving Antarctica, Bevilacqua continued to serve in Seabees construction battalions until 1978, including service in the Vietnam War, retiring with rank of CWO4 (Warrant officer Grade 4.) (Note: "Warrant officers" are the highest rank for enlisted men, with a rank above any petty officer but below any commissioned officer. The highest warrant officer rank is 5, but Navy rules set a strict limit on the number of CWO5s at any one time.)

He died at the age of 89 on November 25, 2019.

== Legacy ==
In 2007, Mount Bevilacqua in Antarctica, "a mostly ice-free mountain rising to 1,164 meters [3,819 ft] 1.5 miles [2.4 km] north of Mount Evans" was named for him, as "the senior enlisted construction Builder Chief and member of the construction crew, which built the original McMurdo Station and the original South Pole Station in the 1955–57 pre-IGY period".

The Antarctica Society wrote of his life: "Charlie was a dedicated, focused, and gifted individual whose unending hours of punishing and innovative work in often grueling conditions helped to start the U.S. Antarctic Program on its trajectory of unexcelled polar science."
