= Bert Drinkwater =

Australian rules footballer

Personal information
- Full name: Albert Drinkwater
- Born: 28 September 1895; Queenscliff, Victoria
- Died: 27 July 1947 (aged 51); Geelong, Victoria
- Original team: Army / St Augustine's
- Height: 171 cm (5 ft 7 in)

Playing career^{1}
Years	Club	Games (Goals)
1918–1920	Essendon	27 (15)
- ^{1} Playing statistics correct to the end of 1920.

Albert Drinkwater (28 September 1895 – 27 July 1947) was an Australian rules footballer for Essendon in the Victorian Football League (VFL).

Drinkwater enlisted in the Australian Imperial Force on 19 August 1914, serving as a private in the 2nd Division Signal Corps until his return to Australia on 13 February 1917.

Drinkwater began his VFL career for Essendon in 1918. He played his final VFL match in 1920 having played 27 matches.
