= San Fermo Maggiore, Verona =

Church in Verona, Italy

Church of San Fermo Maggiore
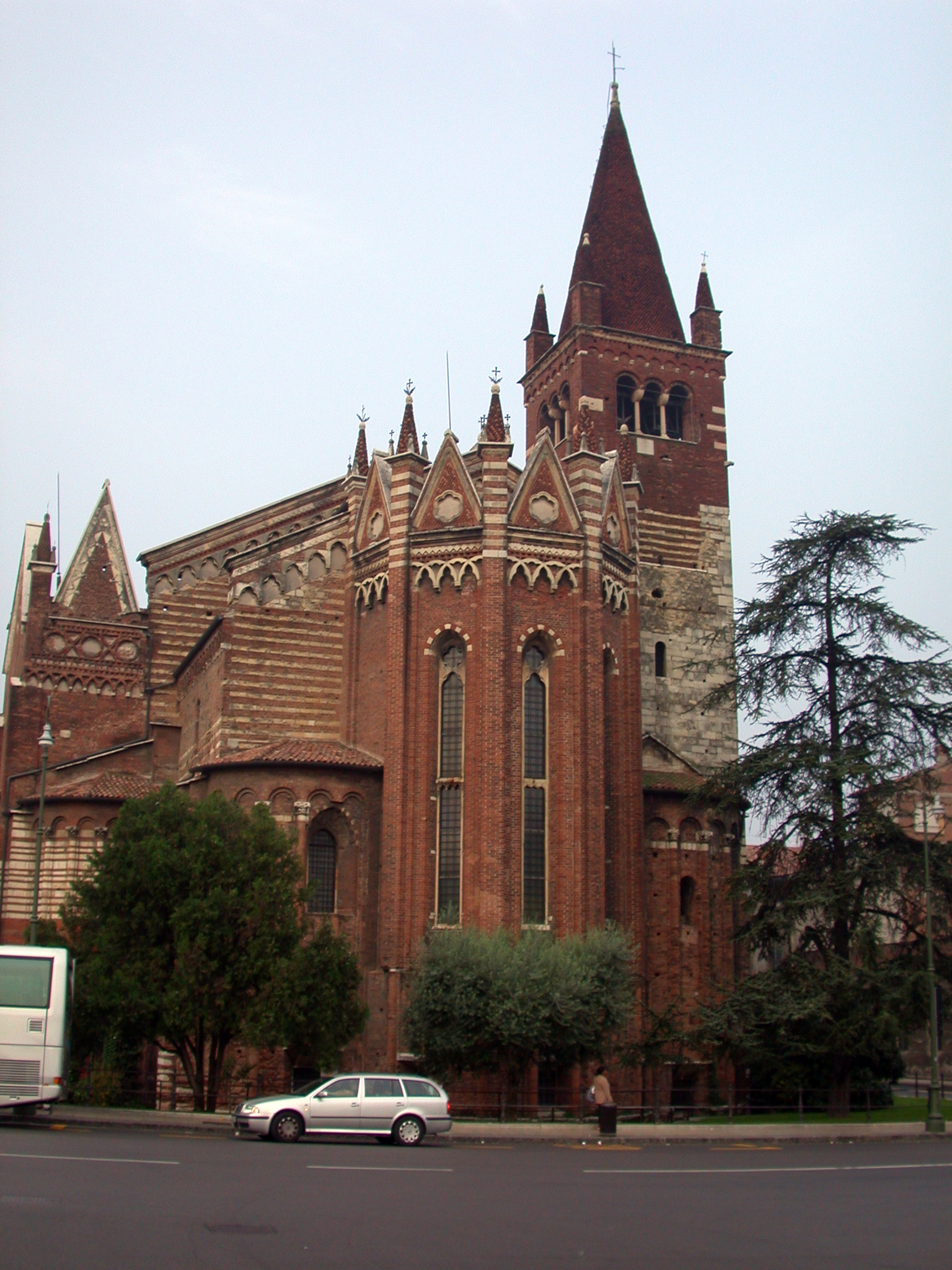
- View of apse

Religion
- Affiliation: Roman Catholic

Location
- Location: Verona, Veneto, Italy
- Interactive map of Church of San Fermo Maggiore
- Coordinates: 45°26′21″N 11°00′00″E

Architecture
- Type: Church
- Style: Romanesque and Gothic
- Groundbreaking: 11th century
- Completed: 15th century

San Fermo Maggiore is a Romanesque and Gothic church in central Verona. It is dedicated to Saints Firmus and Rusticus, brothers who are local martyrs from the 3rd century.

The exterior has a roofline with pinnacles, and the church once held the tomb of a member of the Scaligers. The interior has many medieval frescos, as well as later decoration, including the Brenzoni Monument (discussed below), an altarpiece of St Francis of Assisi by Giovanni Battista Belloti, whilst Veronese's Bevilacqua-Lazise Altarpiece was originally painted for a funerary chapel in the church. A crucifixion on the counter-façade is one of Turone's most significant works.

== History ==
A church at this site may has been traced to the 8th century, and by the 11th century a second story and belltower was added by the Benedictine order. There is a "lower church" (chiesa inferiore) below the main church. The campanile was not completed until the 13th century, it contains six bells in F cast in 1755 and rung with the Veronese bellringing art. The presbytery hosts relics of the saints Fermo and Rustico.

== Brenzoni Monument ==
This striking wall monument is by the Florentine sculptor Nanni di Bartolo, called "il Rosso" ("the redhead") and includes a Resurrection group of Christ, four sleeping soldiers, three angels, and two putti who hold back large canopy curtains, a Venetian style in wall tombs, that here gives the scene something of the effect of a tableau vivant. Above this a fresco Annunciation is the earliest major work by the painter Pisanello to survive. Pisanello was an established painter by this time, but most of his paintings had been frescos on secular subjects for palaces, all now gone. The whole is topped by a statue of a prophet. The monument was probably begun in the 1420s, with the frescos done by 1426, but only finished in 1439.

Rosso is mentioned in the inscription ("Nanni" is a contraction of "Giovanni"):

QVEM GENUIT RUSSI FLORENTIA TUSCA IOHANNIS/ ISTUD SCULPSIT OPUS INGENIOSA MANUS: ("The ingenious hand of Giovanni the redhead, a child of Tuscan Florence, carved this work.")
