= Bevilacqua-Lazise Altarpiece =

Painting by Paolo Veronese

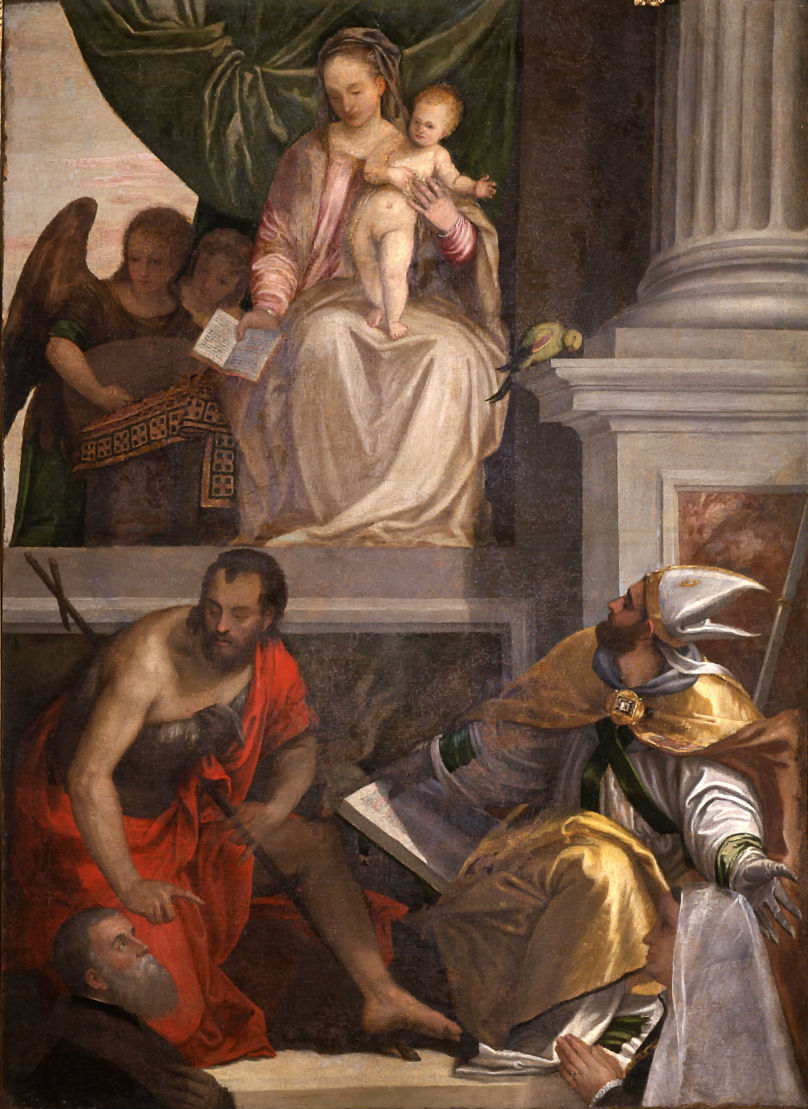
Bevilacqua-Lazise Altarpiece (1548) by Paolo Veronese

The Bevilacqua-Lazise Altarpiece is an oil-on-canvas painting by the Italian Renaissance painter Paolo Veronese, from 1548. It is now held in Castelvecchio Museum, in Verona. It was commissioned by the Bevilaqua-Lazise family for their funerary chapel in the church of San Fermo Maggiore in Verona. Two members of the family are shown praying in the bottom corners, with John the Baptist and a bishop saint. The Virgin Mary and Jesus as a child are also depicted at the top of the painting, and are being attended to by angels. The altarpiece is an early work by Veronese, painted when his style still bore the strong imprint of his teacher Antonio Badile.
