= List of palaces in Italy =

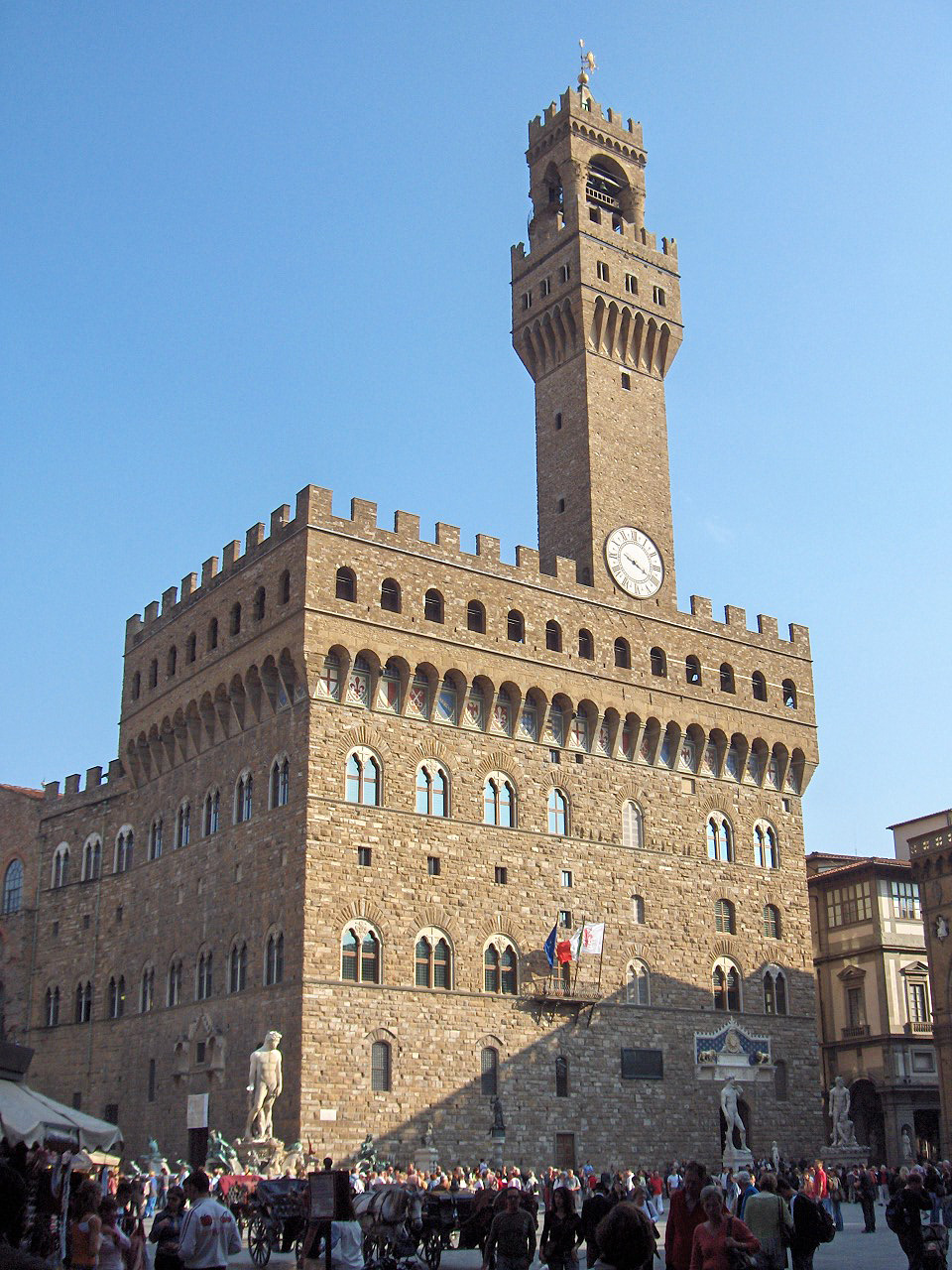
Palazzo Vecchio, Florence

This is a list of notable palaces in Italy, sorted by city.

== Acireale ==
- Palazzo Calanna, Acireale
- Palazzo della Città, Acireale
- Palazzo Musmeci, Acireale

== Alatri ==
- Palazzo Gottifredo, Alatri

== Albano Laziale ==
- Pamphilj Palace (Albano)

== Anagni ==
- Palace of the Popes in Anagni

== Ancona ==
- Palazzo Bosdari
- Loggia dei Mercanti

== Anzio ==
- Paradiso sul mare, Anzio

== Ariccia ==
- Palazzo Chigi of Ariccia

== Ascoli Piceno ==
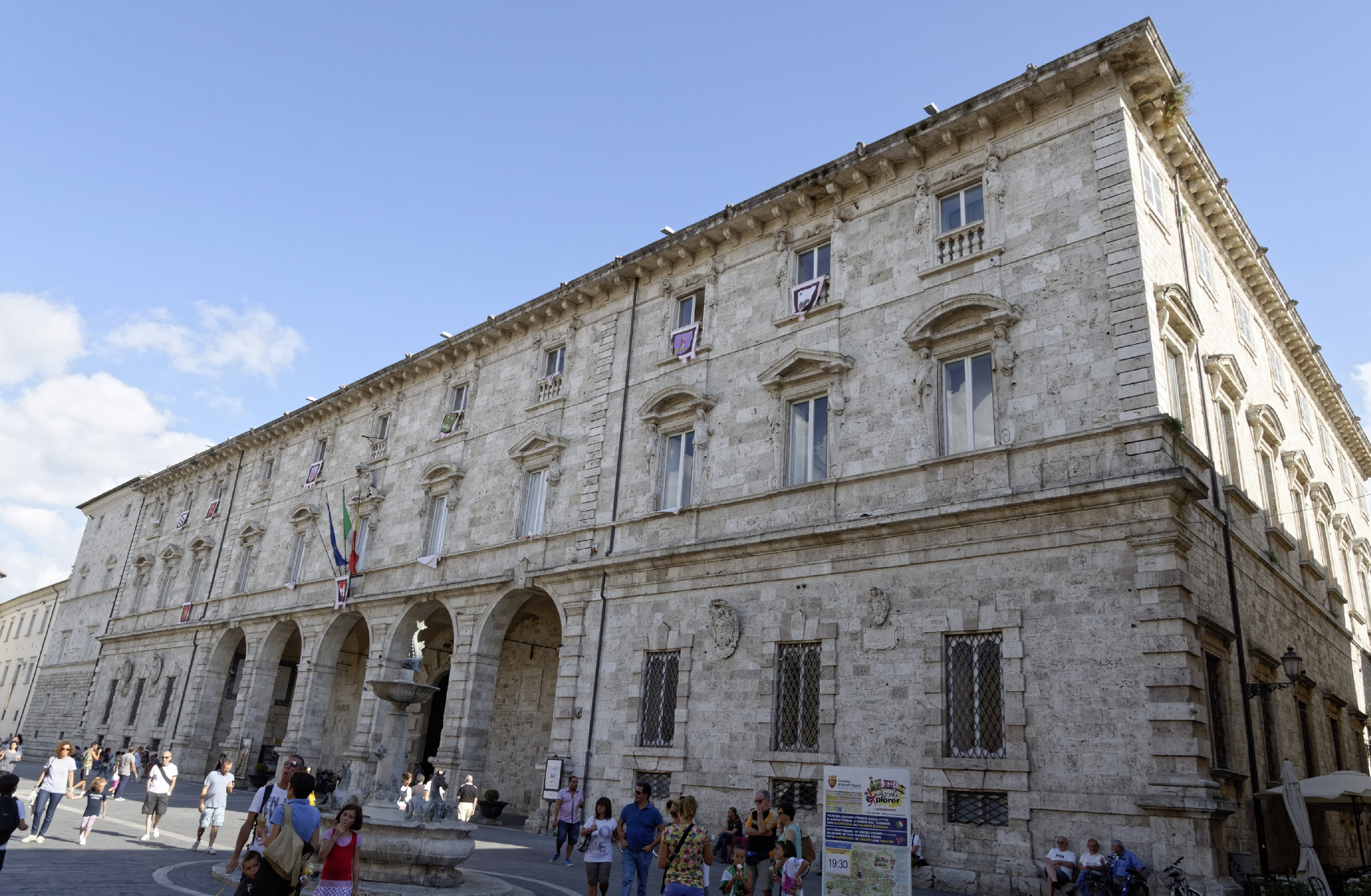
Palazzo dell'Arengo, Ascoli Piceno

- Palazzo dei Capitani del Popolo
- Palazzo dell'Arengo

== Asti ==
- Palazzo Gazelli

== Atina ==
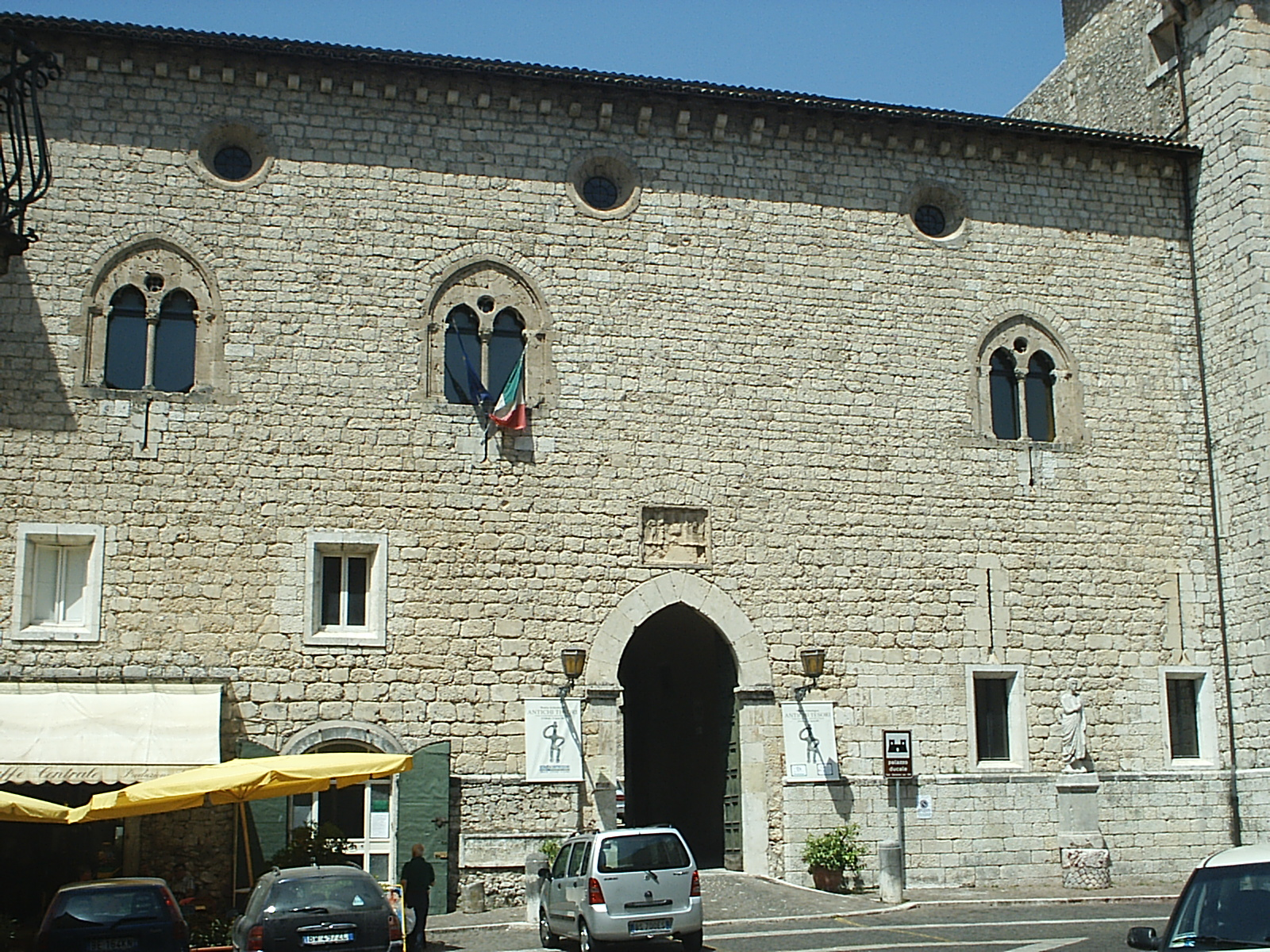
Ducal Palace of Atina

- Ducal Palace of Atina

== Belluno ==
- Palazzo Crepadona

== Belmonte Calabro ==
- Palazzo Ravaschieri Fieschi della Torre
- Palazzo Rivellino

== Bergamo ==
- Palazzo della Ragione, Bergamo
- Museo Adriano Bernareggi
- Palazzo Moroni

== Bernalda ==
- Palazzo Margherita

== Bologna ==
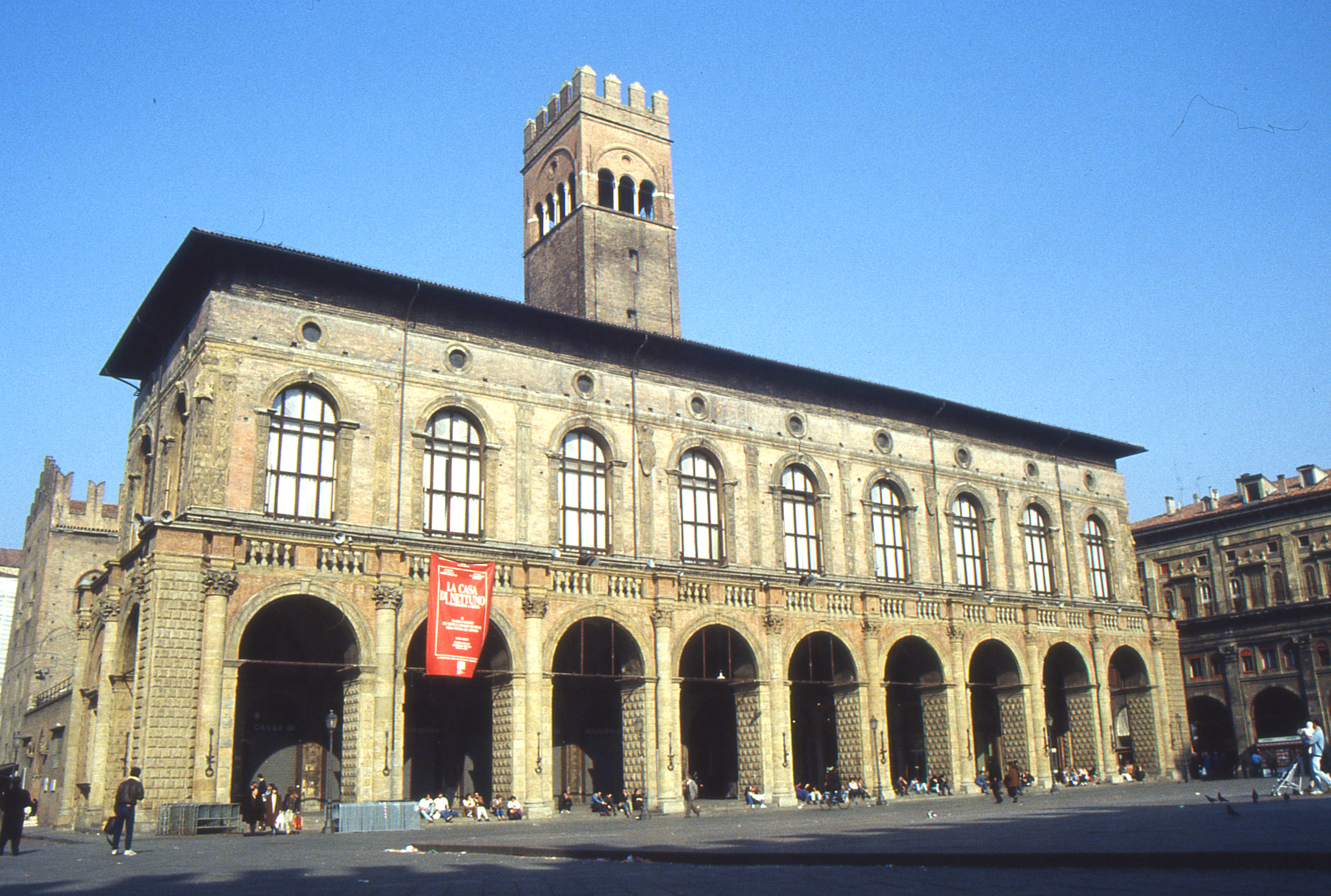
Palazzo del Podestà, Bologna

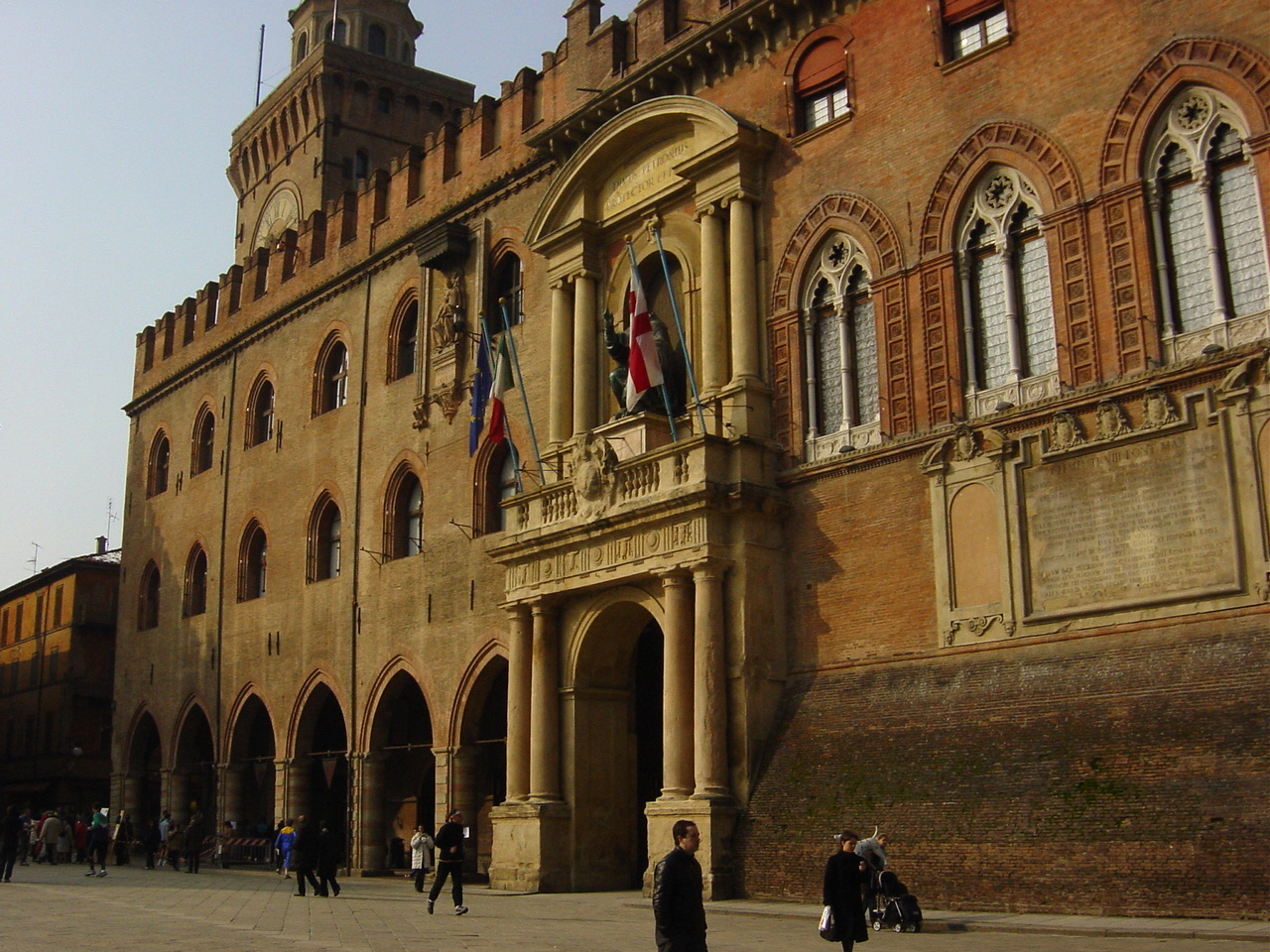
Palazzo d'Accursio, Bologna

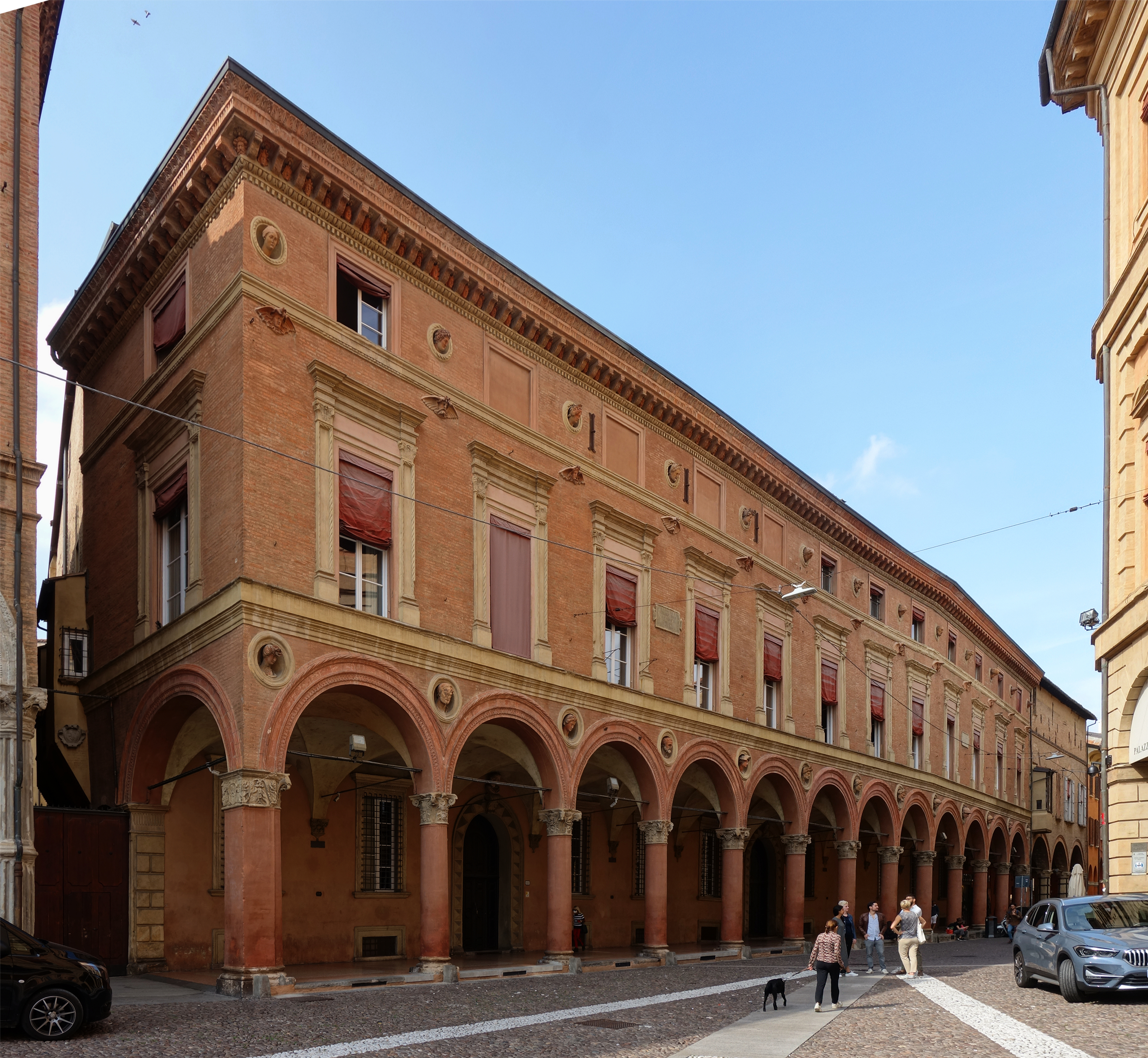
Palazzo Bolognini Amorini Salina, Bologna

- Palazzo d'Accursio
- Palazzo Albergati
- Palazzo Aldrovandi, Bologna
- Palazzo dei Banchi
- Palazzo Davia Bargellini, Bologna
- Palazzo Belloni, Bologna
- Palazzo Bentivoglio, Bologna
- Palazzo Bocchi
- Palazzo Bolognini Amorini Salina
- Palazzo Bonasoni, Bologna
- Palazzo Caprara, Bologna
- Palazzo Cospi Ferretti
- Palazzo Dall'Armi Marescalchi, Bologna
- Palazzo Dondini Ghiselli, Bologna
- Palazzo Fantuzzi, Bologna
- Palazzo Felicini, Bologna
- Palazzo Ghisilardi Fava
- Palazzo Grassi, Bologna
- Palazzo Hercolani, Bologna
- Palazzo Bolognetti, Bologna
- Palazzo Isolani, Bologna
- Palazzo Legnani Pizzardo, Bologna
- Palazzo Leoni, Bologna
- Palazzo Magnani, Bologna
- Palazzo Malvezzi de' Medici
- Palazzo Malvezzi Campeggi, Bologna
- Palazzo Marescotti Brazzetti, Bologna
- Palazzo Dal Monte, Bologna
- Palazzo dei Notai
- Palazzo Orsi Mangelli
- Palazzina Majani, Bologna
- Palazzo della Compagnia dell'Arte dei Brentatori, Bologna
- Palazzo Pallavicini at Via San Felice
- Palazzo Pannolini, Bologna
- Palazzo Pepoli Campogrande, Bologna
- Palazzo Pepoli Vecchio
- Palazzo del Podestà, Bologna
- Palazzo Poggi
- Palazzo Ranuzzi
- Palazzo Re Enzo
- Palazzo di Residenza della Cassa di Risparmio in Bologna
- Palazzo Rossi Poggi Marsili
- Palazzo Sampieri Talon
- Palazzo Sanguinetti
- Palazzo degli Strazzaroli, Bologna
- Palazzo Torfanini, Bologna
- Palazzo Vizzani Lambertini Sanguinetti
- Palazzo Zagnoni, Bologna
- Palazzo Zambeccari, Bologna
- Palazzo Zani, Bologna

== Bomarzo ==
- Palazzo Orsini (Bomarzo)

== Brescia ==
Palazzo della Loggia, Brescia

- Palazzo della Loggia (Brescia)
- Palazzo Averoldi

== Brugherio ==
- Palazzo Ghirlanda-Silva

== Caltagirone ==
- Palazzo Senatorio, Caltagirone
- Villa Patti, Caltagirone

== Caprarola ==
- Palazzo Farnese

== Caravaggio ==
- Gallavresi Palace

== Caserta ==
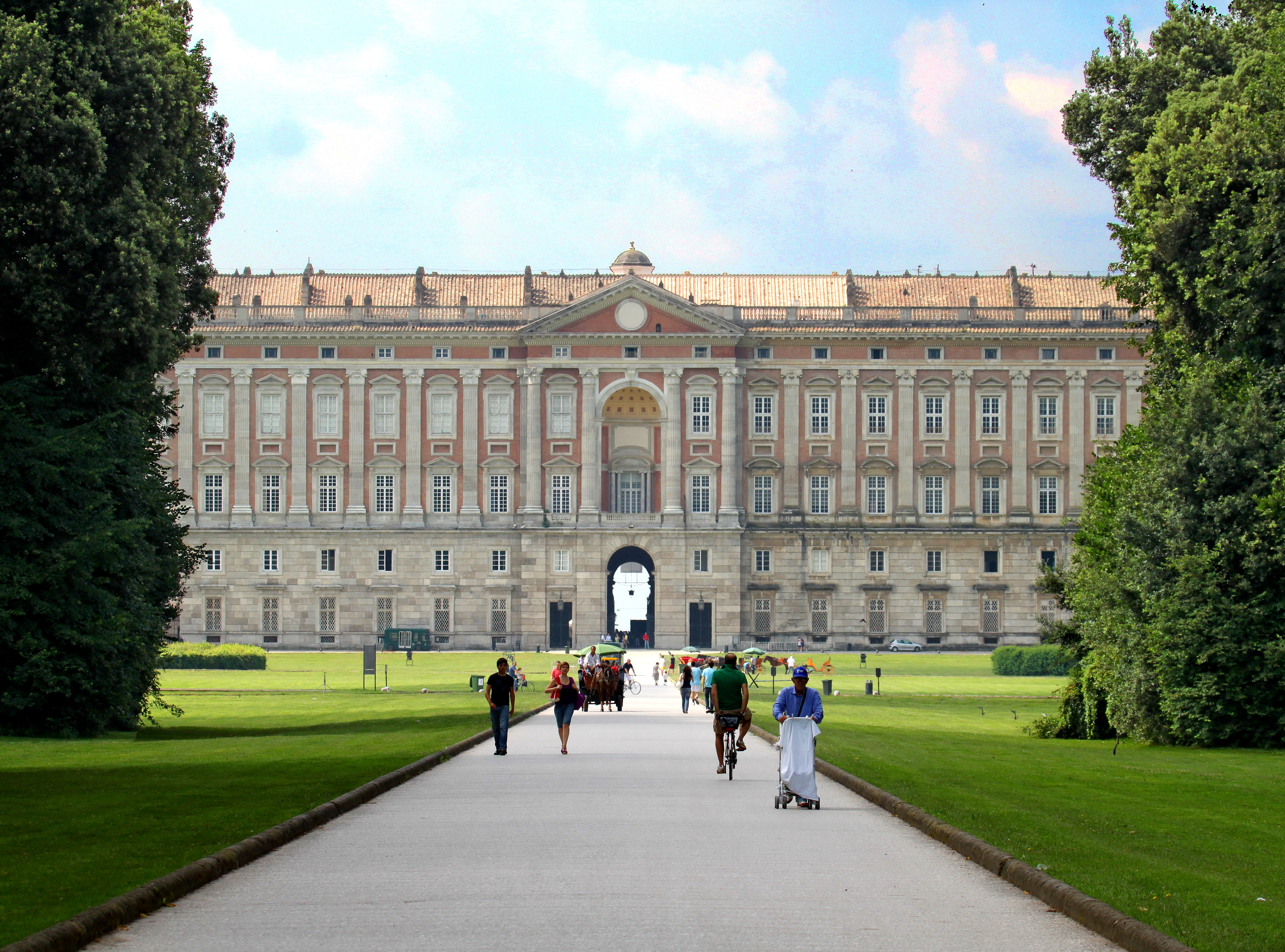
Royal Palace of Caserta

- Royal Palace of Caserta

== Castel Gandolfo ==
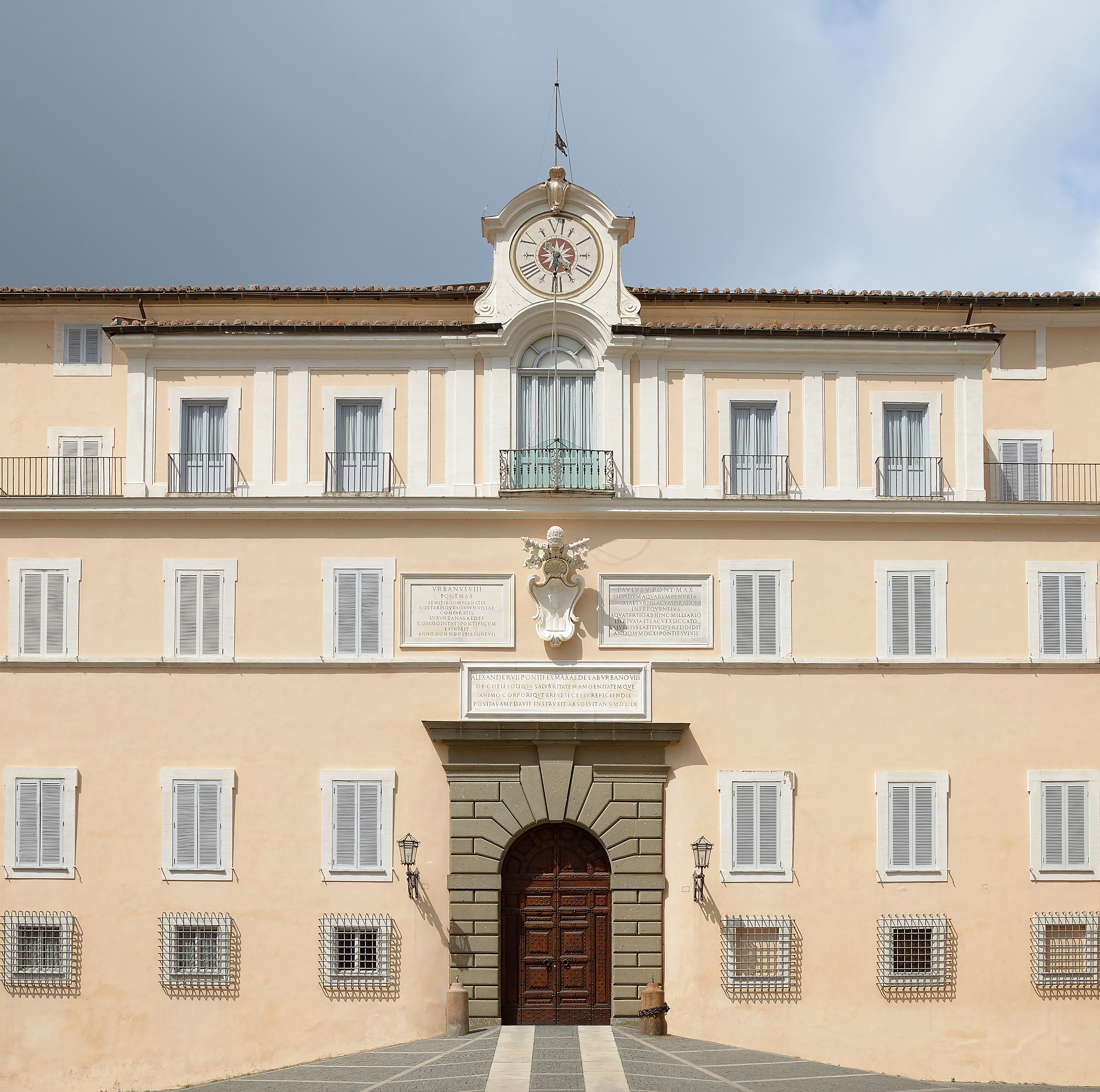
Papal Palace of Castel Gandolfo

- Papal Palace of Castel Gandolfo – the summer residence of the pope, the head of the Catholic Church

== Castel Goffredo ==
- Palazzo Gonzaga-Acerbi

== Castiglione del Lago ==
- Palazzo della Corgna, Castiglione del Lago

== Catania ==
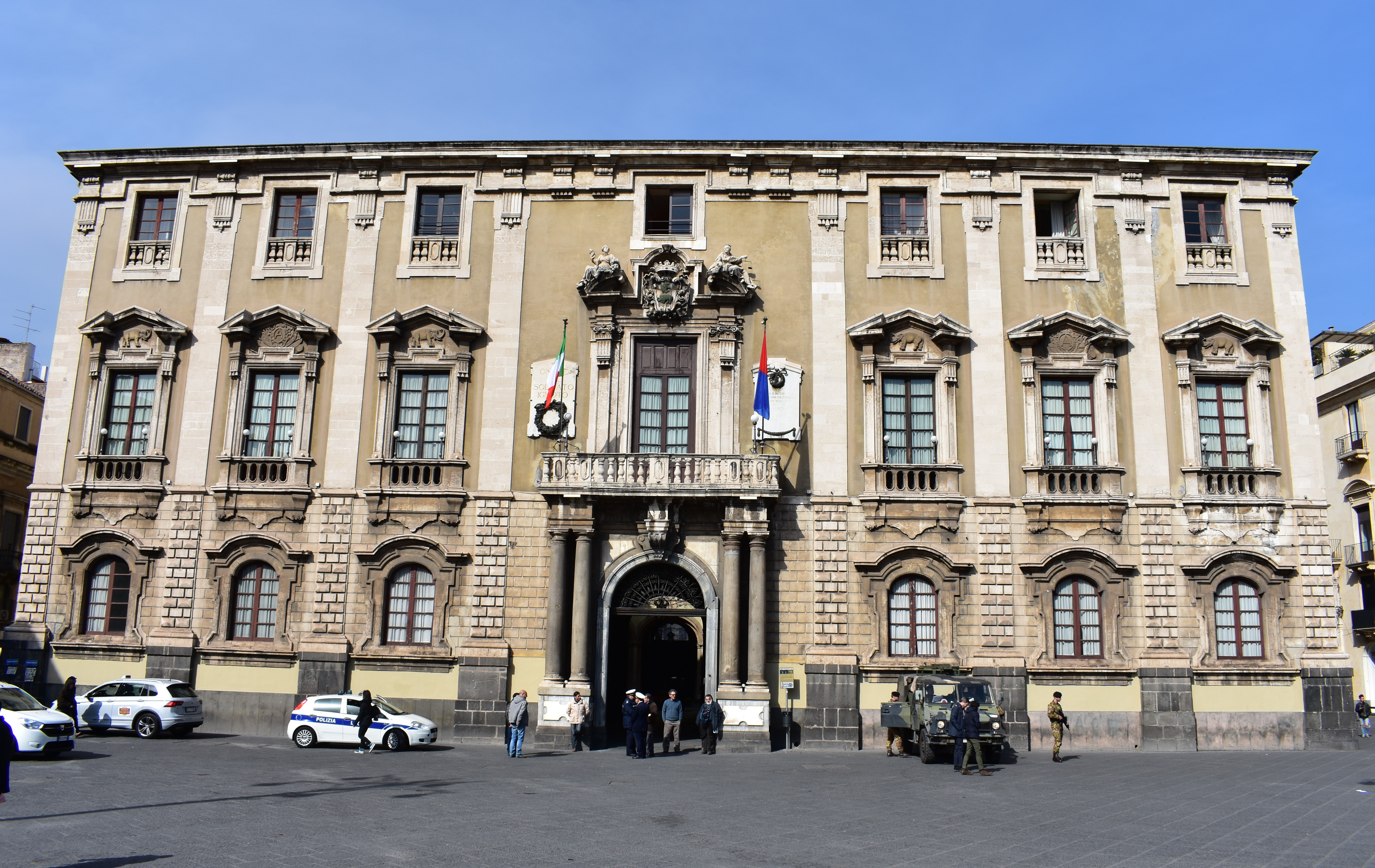
Palazzo degli Elefanti, Catania

- Palazzo Biscari
- Palazzo degli Elefanti
- Palazzo del Seminario dei Chierici
- Palazzo Cutelli
- Palazzo Gioeni Asmundo
- Palazzo Gravina-Cruyllas
- Palazzo Manganelli, Catania
- Palazzo della Borsa, Catania
- Palazzo Paternò del Toscano
- Piazza Mazzini, Catania
- Palazzo delle Poste, Catania
- Palazzo Rosa, Catania
- Palazzo San Demetrio, Catania
- Palazzo San Giuliano, Catania
- Palazzo delle Scienze, Catania
- Palazzo Tezzano
- Palazzo dell'Università, Catania

== Cavallino ==
- Palazzo Castromediano-Limburg

== Cefalù ==
- Palazzo Atenasio Martino

== Cesano Maderno ==
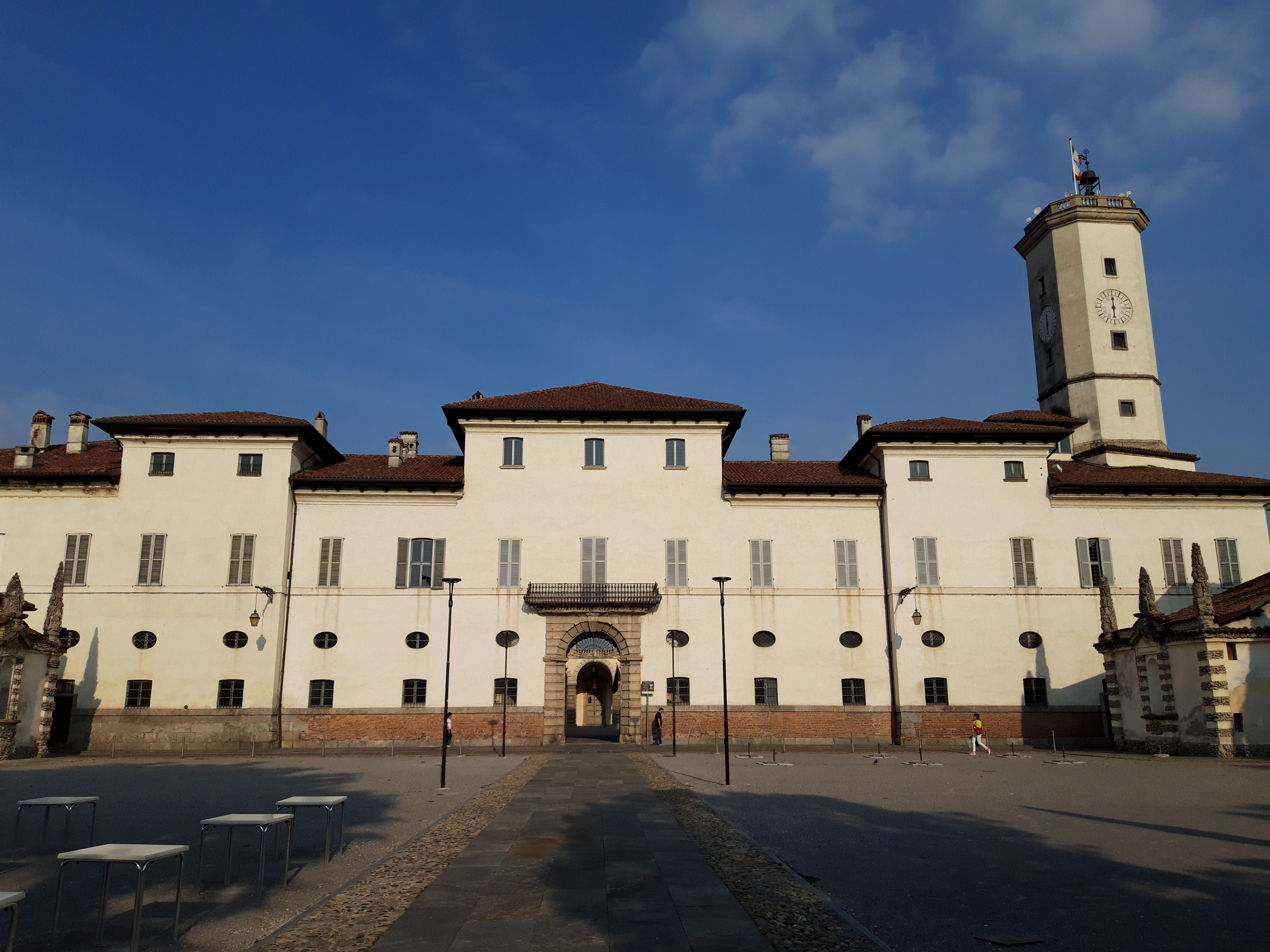
Palazzo Arese Borromeo, Cesano Maderno

- Palazzo Arese Borromeo

== Cesena ==
- Palazzo Ghini

== Chiavenna ==
- Palazzo Vertemate-Franchi, Valchiavenna

== Cingoli ==
- Palazzo Castiglioni (Cingoli)

== Città di Castello ==
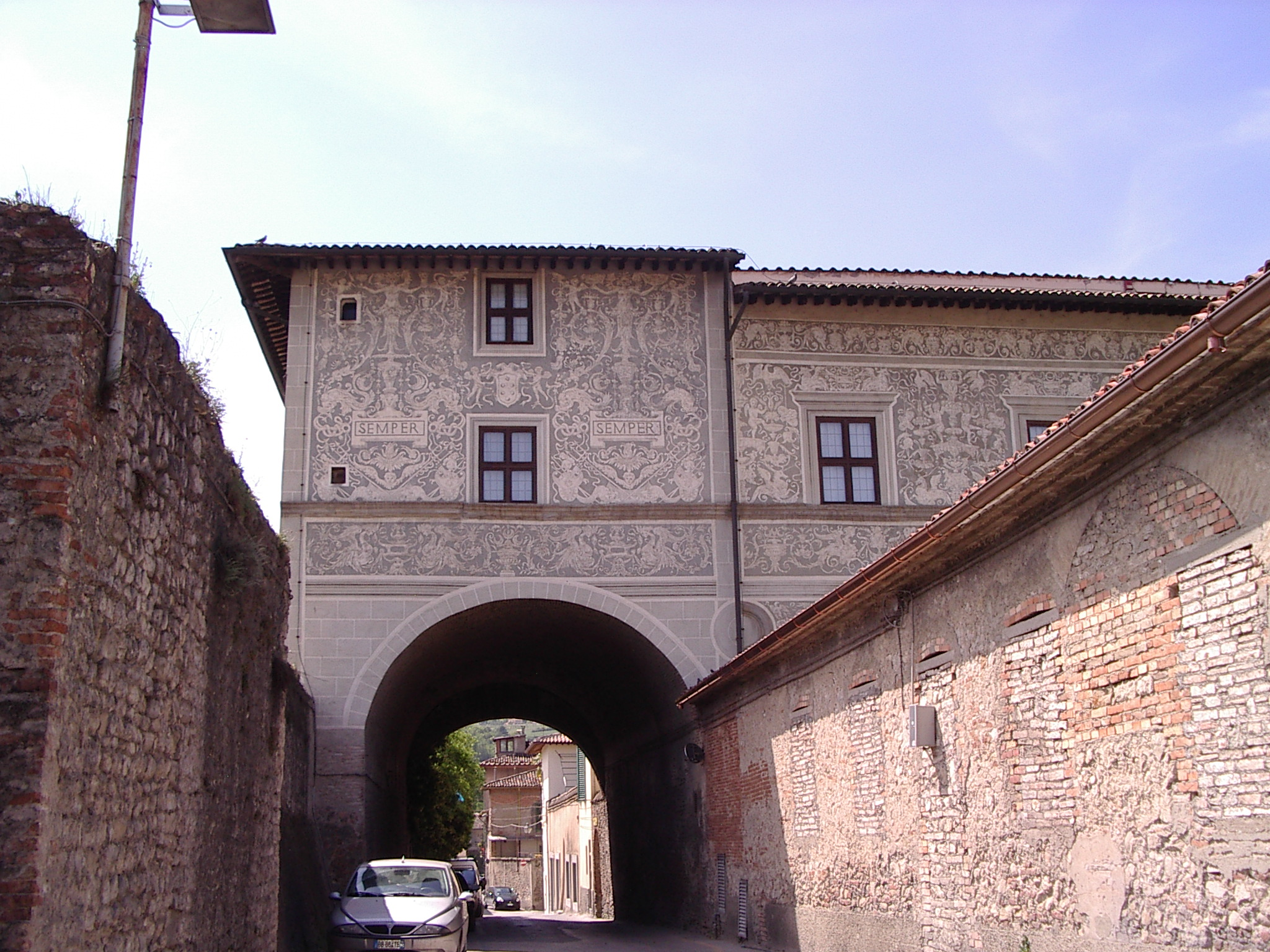
Pinacoteca Comunale, Città di Castello

- Pinacoteca Comunale, Città di Castello

== Cividale del Friuli ==
- Palazzo Pretorio, Cividale del Friuli

== Colorno ==
- Palazzo Ducale

== Como ==
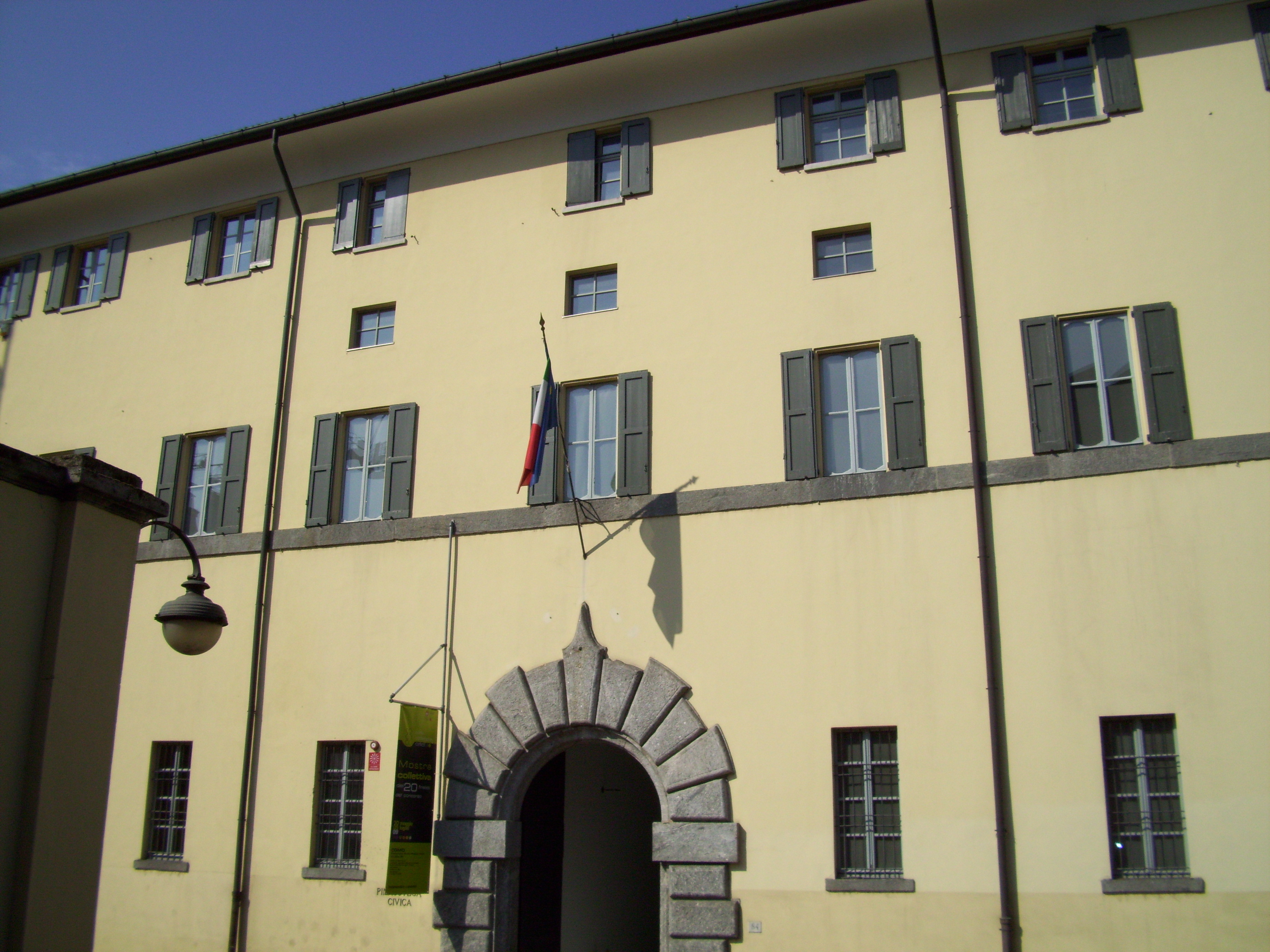
Pinacoteca Civica di Palazzo Volpi, Como

- Pinacoteca Civica di Palazzo Volpi, Como

== Crema ==
- Palazzo Arrigoni Albergoni
- Palazzo Donati
- Palazzo Donati (gia Benzoni, Bernardi, Vailati)

== Cremona ==
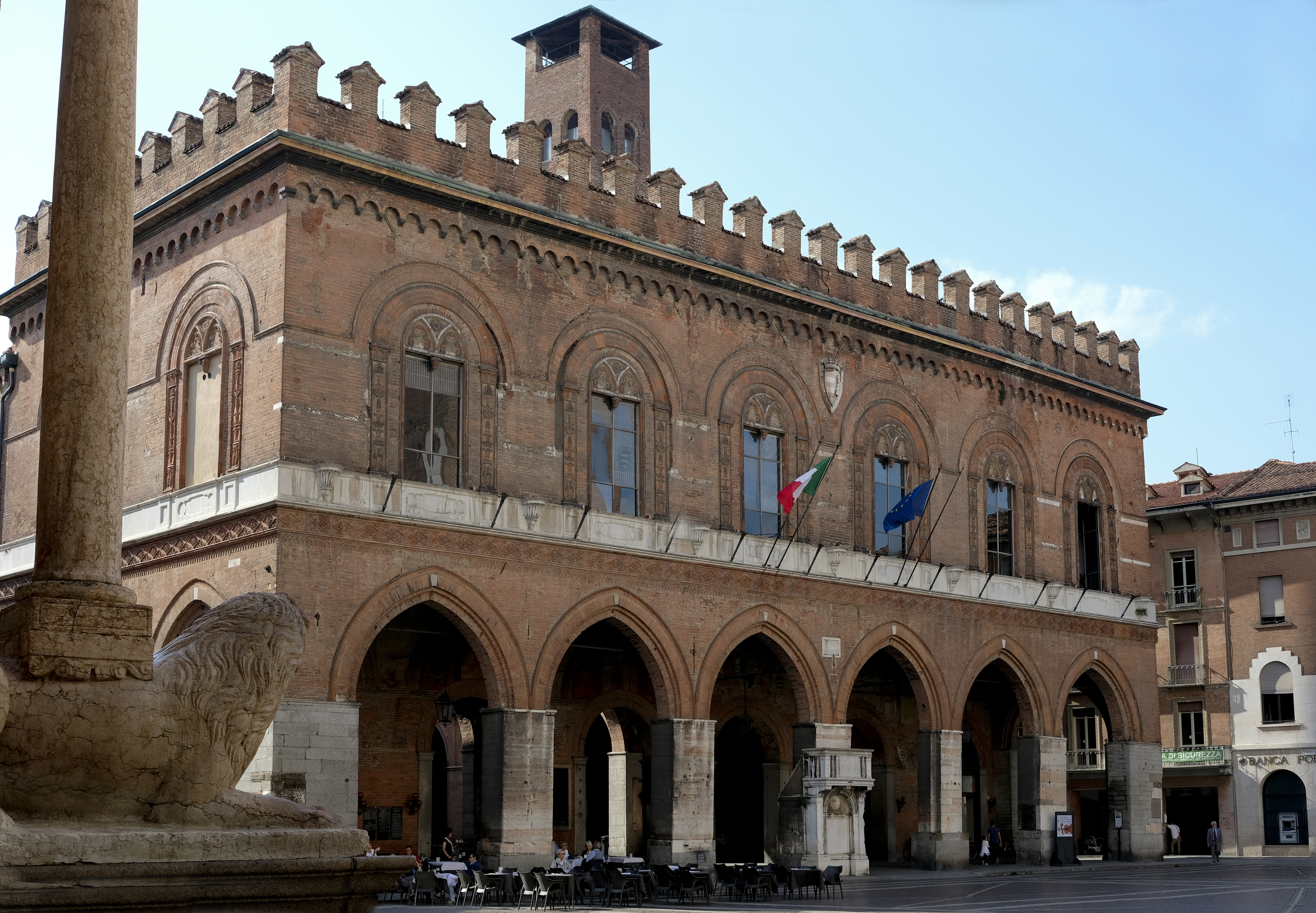
Palazzo del Comune, Cremona

- Palazzo del Comune, Cremona

== Domodossola ==
- Palazzo Silva, Domodossola

== Este ==
- Palazzo Mocenigo, Este

== Fano ==
- Teatro della Fortuna

== Fermo ==
- Palazzo dei Priori, Fermo

== Ferrara ==
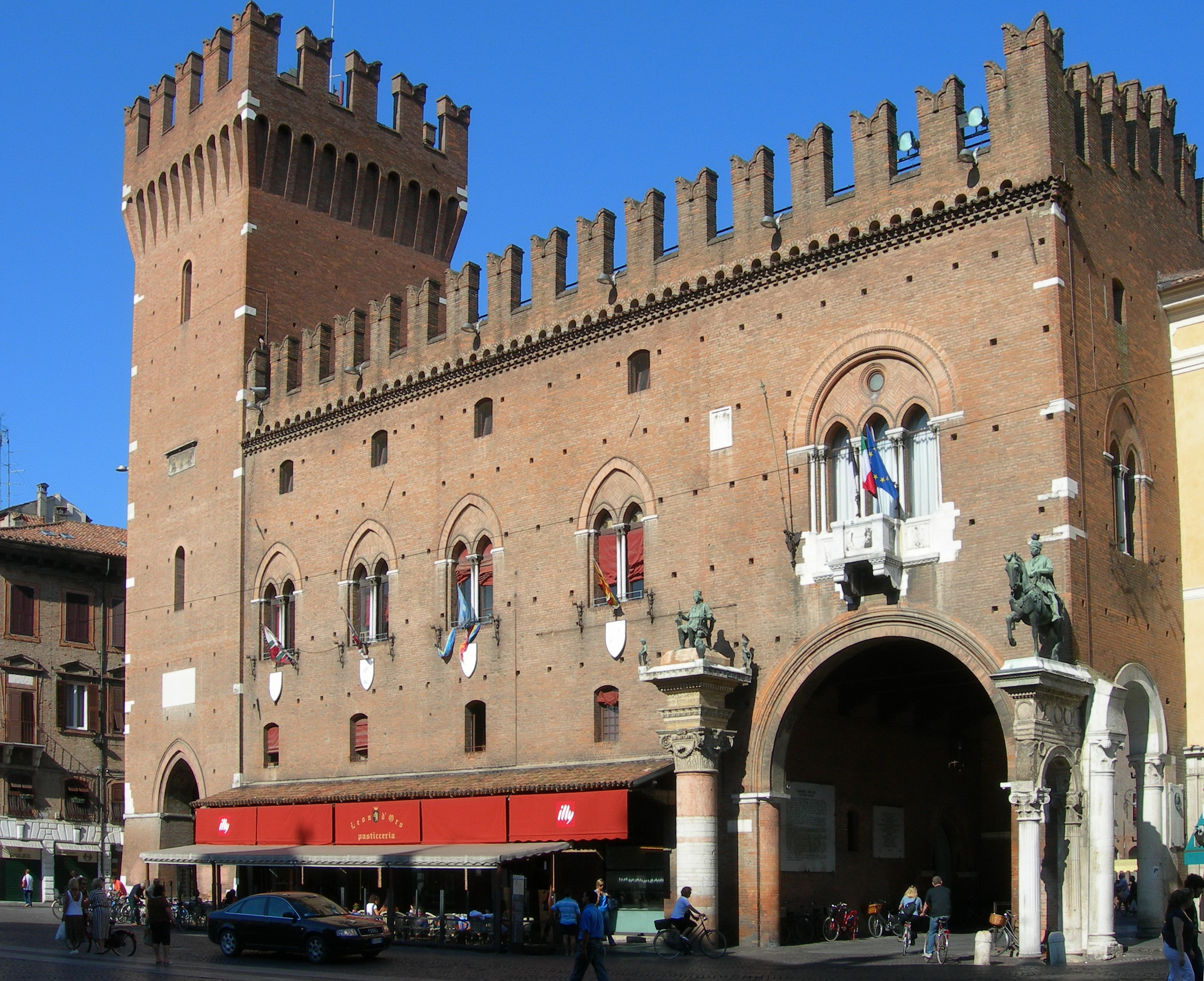
Palazzo Municipale of Ferrara

- Palazzo della Ragione (Ferrara)
- Palazzo di San Crispino
- Palazzo Bentivoglio, Ferrara
- Palazzo Bevilacqua-Costabili, Ferrara
- Palazzo Bonacossi
- Palazzo dei Diamanti
- Palazzo Giulio d'Este
- Palazzina Marfisa d'Este
- Palazzo Massari
- Palazzo Arcivescovile (Ferrara)
- Palazzo Contrari
- Palazzo Municipale of Ferrara
- Palazzo Turchi di Bagno
- Palazzo Paradiso
- Palazzo Pendaglia
- Palazzo Prosperi-Sacrati
- Palazzo Roverella, Ferrara
- Palazzo Schifanoia

== Ficuzza ==
- Royal Palace of Ficuzza

== Fiesole ==
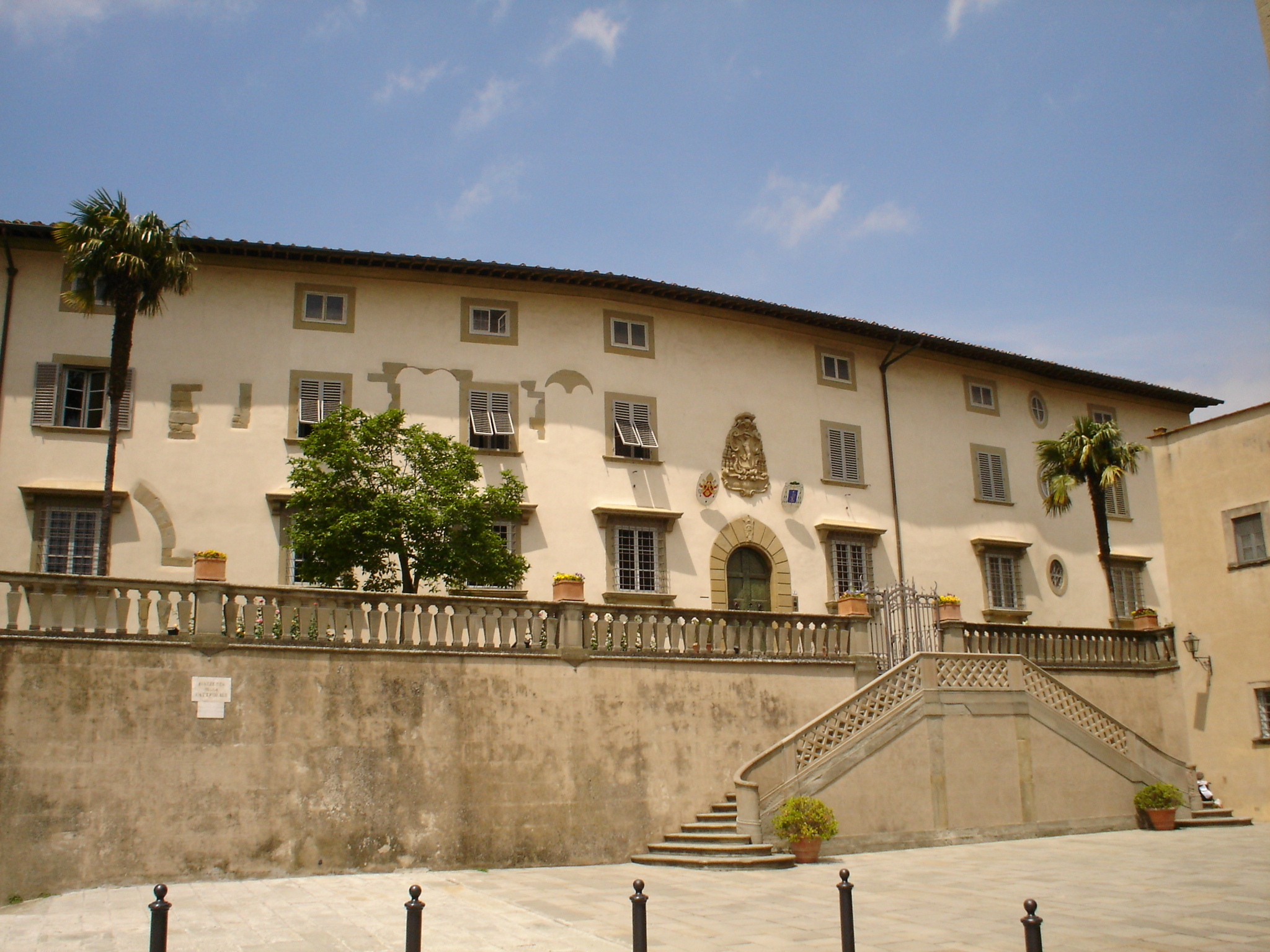
Episcopal Palace, Fiesole

- Episcopal Palace, Fiesole

== Fino Mornasco ==
- Villa Raimondi, Fino Mornasco

== Florence ==
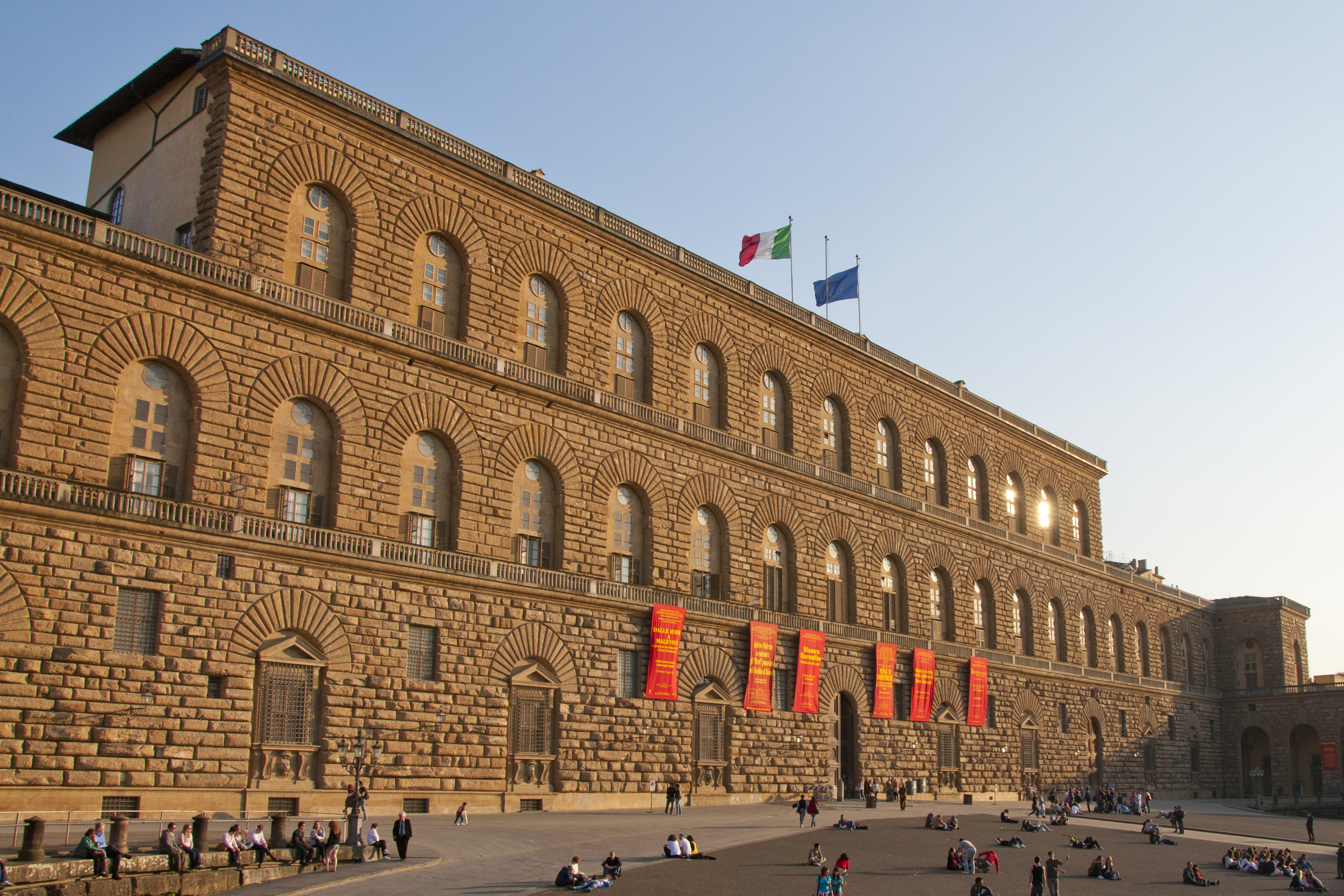
Palazzo Pitti, Florence

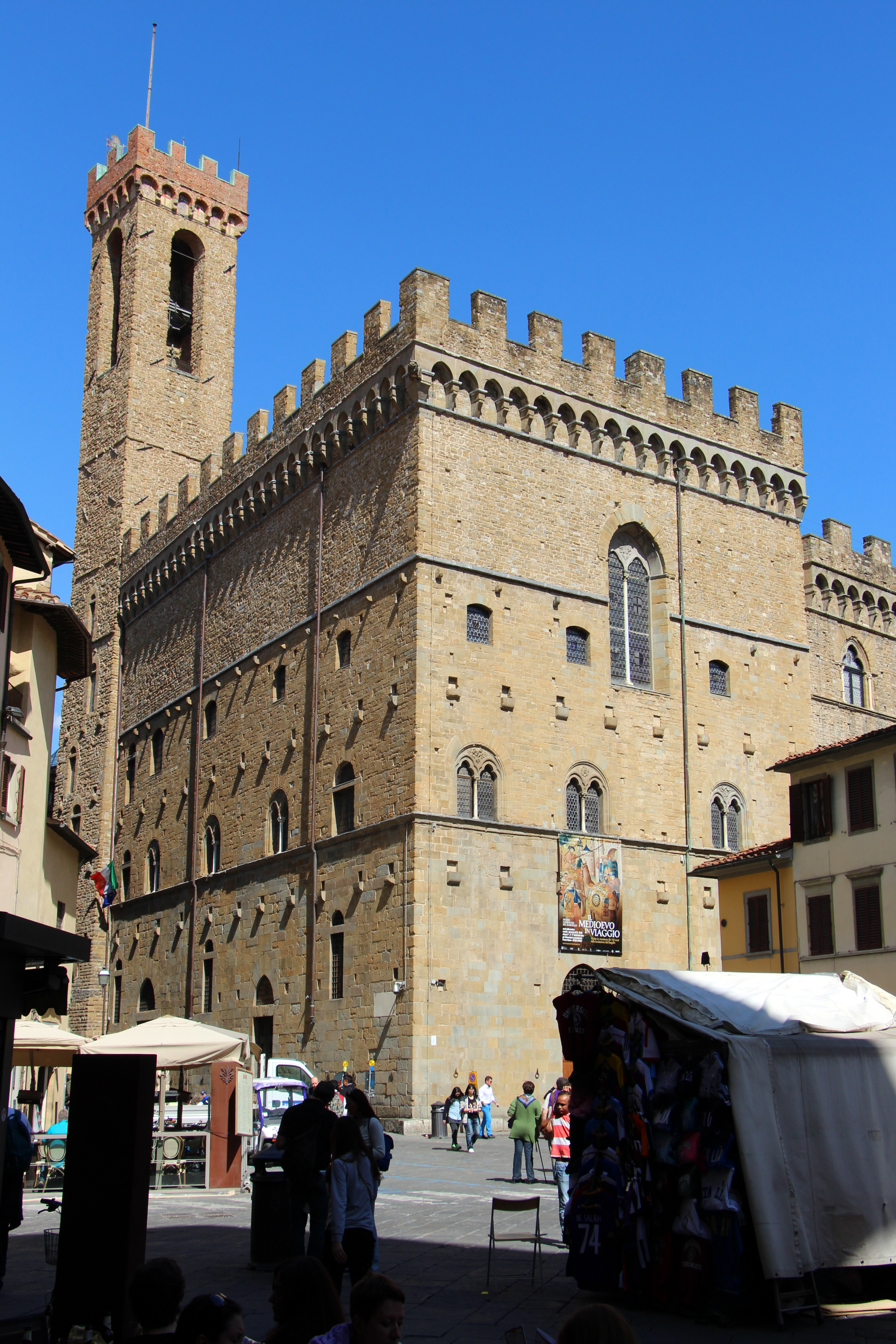
Bargello, Florence

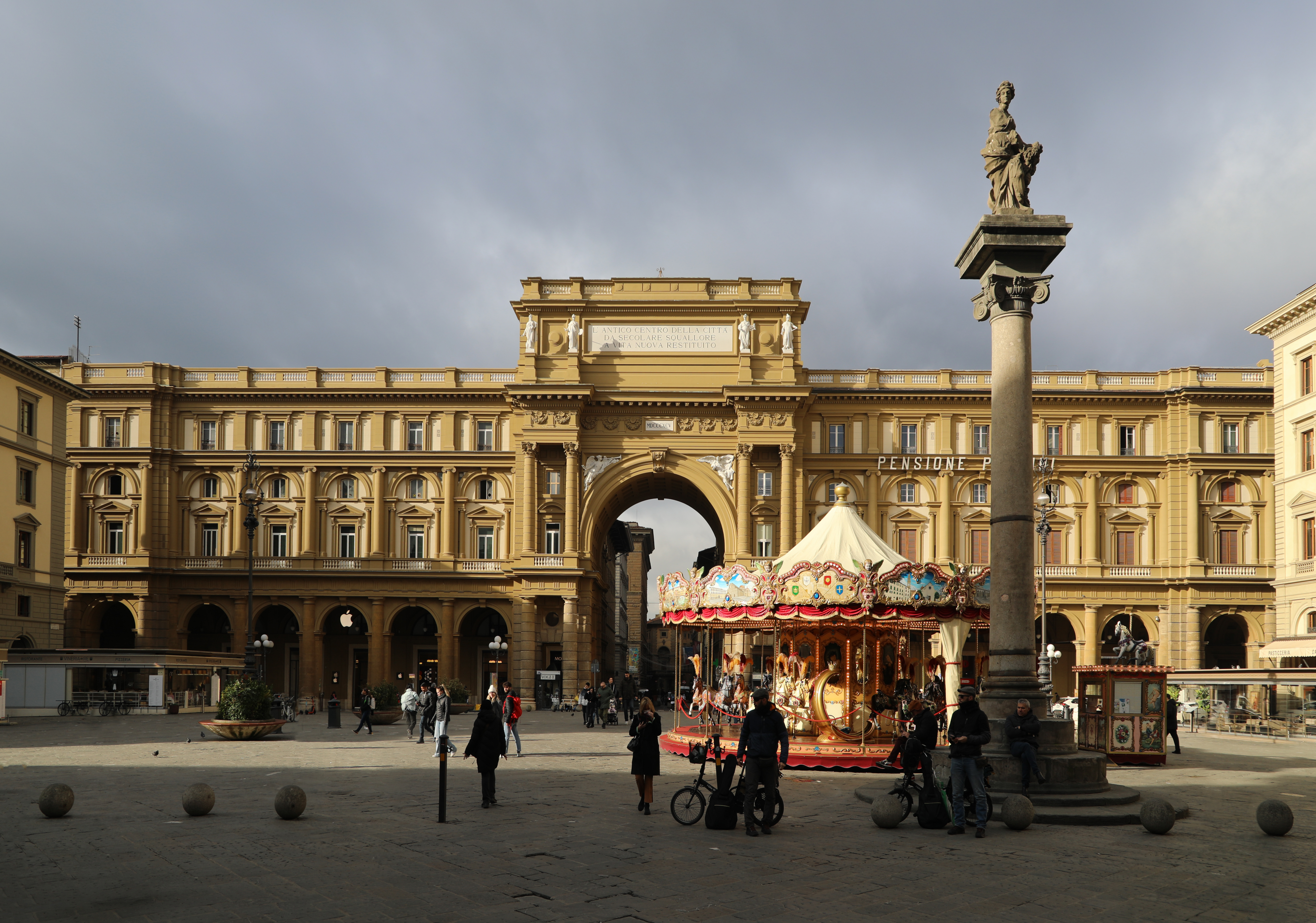
Palazzo dell'Arcone di Piazza, Florence

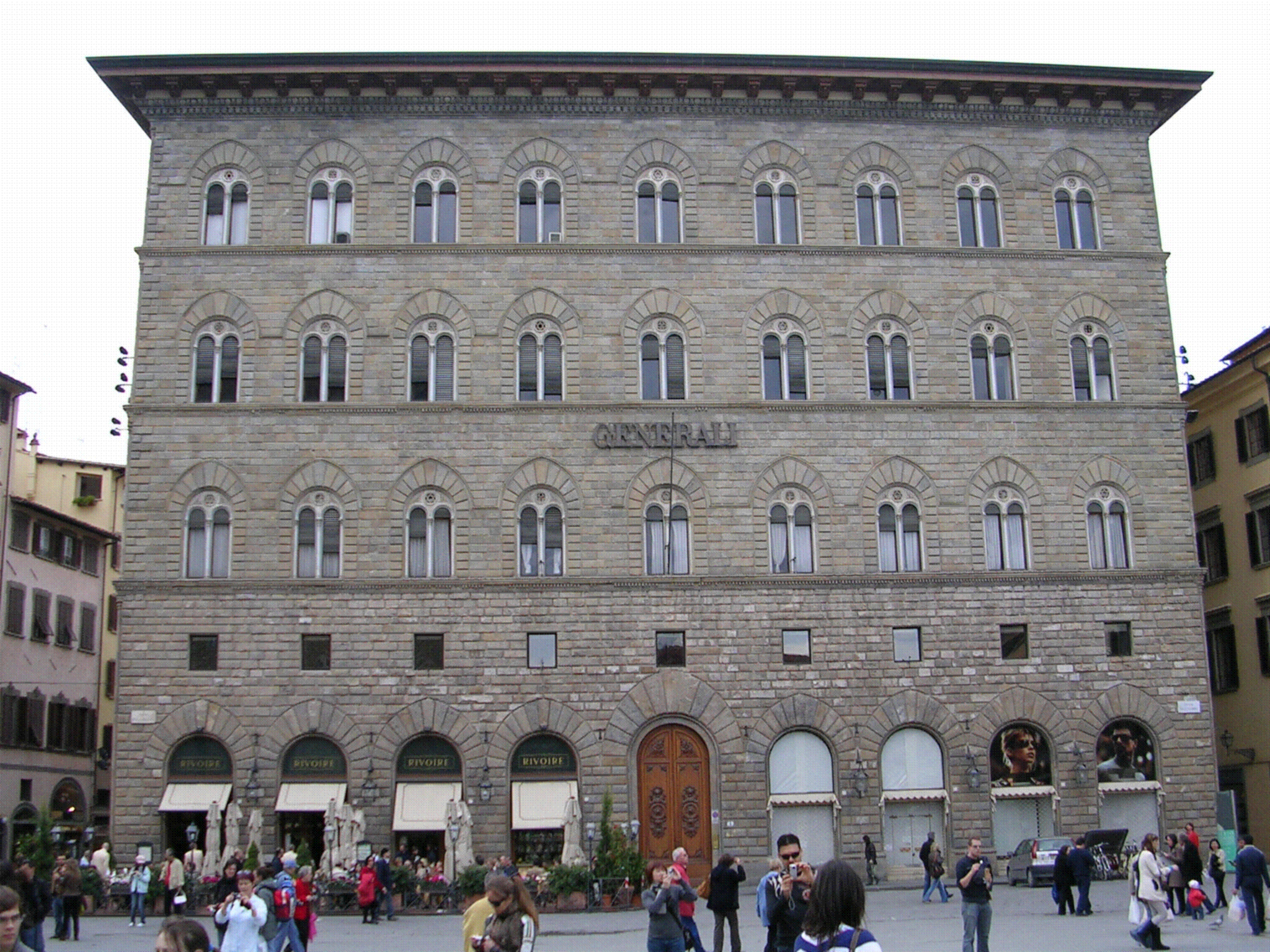
Palazzo delle Assicurazioni Generali, Florence

- Palazzo degli Alessandri, Florence
- Palazzo dell'Antella
- Palazzo Antinori
- Palazzo dell'Arte dei Beccai
- Palazzo delle Assicurazioni Generali, Florence
- Bargello
- Palazzo Bartoli Corbini
- Palazzo Bartolini Salimbeni
- Palazzo Bartolini-Torrigiani
- Palazzo di Bianca Cappello
- Palazzo Borgherini-Rosselli del Turco
- Palazzo Budini Gattai
- Palazzo Busini Bardi
- Palazzo Canacci, Florence
- Palazzo Canigiani, Florence
- Palazzo Capponi, Florence
- Palazzo Capponi alle Rovinate
- Palazzo Capponi-Covoni
- Palazzo dei Cartelloni
- Casa Acciaiuoli
- Casa Carlini
- Palazzina Reale delle Cascine
- Casino Mediceo di San Marco
- Palazzo del Circolo dell'Unione
- Palazzo Cocchi-Serristori
- Palazzo Compagni
- Palazzo Corsini (Via del Parione)
- Palazzo Davanzati
- Palazzo della Signoria
- Palazzo Fenzi
- Florence Courthouse
- Palazzo Frescobaldi, Florence
- Galleria Rinaldo Carnielo
- Palazzo Gerini
- Palazzo Gherardi
- Palazzo Ginori
- Palazzo Giugni
- Palazzo Gondi
- Palazzo Guadagni Strozzi Sacrati
- Museo Horne
- Palazzo Lanfredini
- Palazzo Larderel
- Palazzo Magnani Feroni
- Palazzo Malenchini Alberti
- Palazzo Martelli
- Palazzo Medici Riccardi
- Palazzo Minerbetti
- Palazzo Mondragone
- Palazzo Mozzi
- Palazzo Nasi
- Palazzo Nonfinito
- Palazzo Orlandini del Beccuto
- Ospedale Bonifacio
- Palazzina Reale di Santa Maria Novella
- Palazzo Acciaiuoli
- Palazzo Adorni
- Palazzo Adorni Braccesi
- Palazzo Anselmi Ristori
- Palazzo al Canto di Sant'Anna
- Palazzo Bastogi
- Palazzo Bezzoli
- Palazzo Borghese-Aldobrandini
- Palazzo Caccini
- Palazzo degli Sporti
- Palazzo dei Vescovi a San Miniato al Monte
- Palazzo dell'Arcone di Piazza
- Palazzo Naldini
- Palazzo Neroni
- Palazzo Rosselli del Turco
- Palazzo Panciatichi, Florence
- Palazzo di Parte Guelfa
- Palazzo Pazzi
- Palazzo Pitti
- Palazzo Pola e Todescan
- Palazzo Pucci, Florence
- Palazzo Ramirez de Montalvo
- Palazzo Rinuccini
- Palazzo Rucellai
- Palazzo di San Clemente
- Palazzo Serristori, Oltrarno
- Palazzo Spini Feroni
- Palazzo Strozzi
- Palazzo dello Strozzino
- Palazzo Tempi
- Torre dei Gianfigliazzi
- Palazzo Torrigani, Florence
- Palazzo Torrigiani Del Nero
- Uffizi
- Palazzo Uguccioni
- Palazzo Vecchietti
- Palazzo Vecchio
- Palazzo Venturi, Florence
- Palazzo Venturi Ginori
- Palazzo Vivarelli Colonna
- Palazzo Viviani della Robbia, Florence
- Palazzo Zuccari, Florence

== Foggia ==
- Palazzo Dogana

== Foligno ==
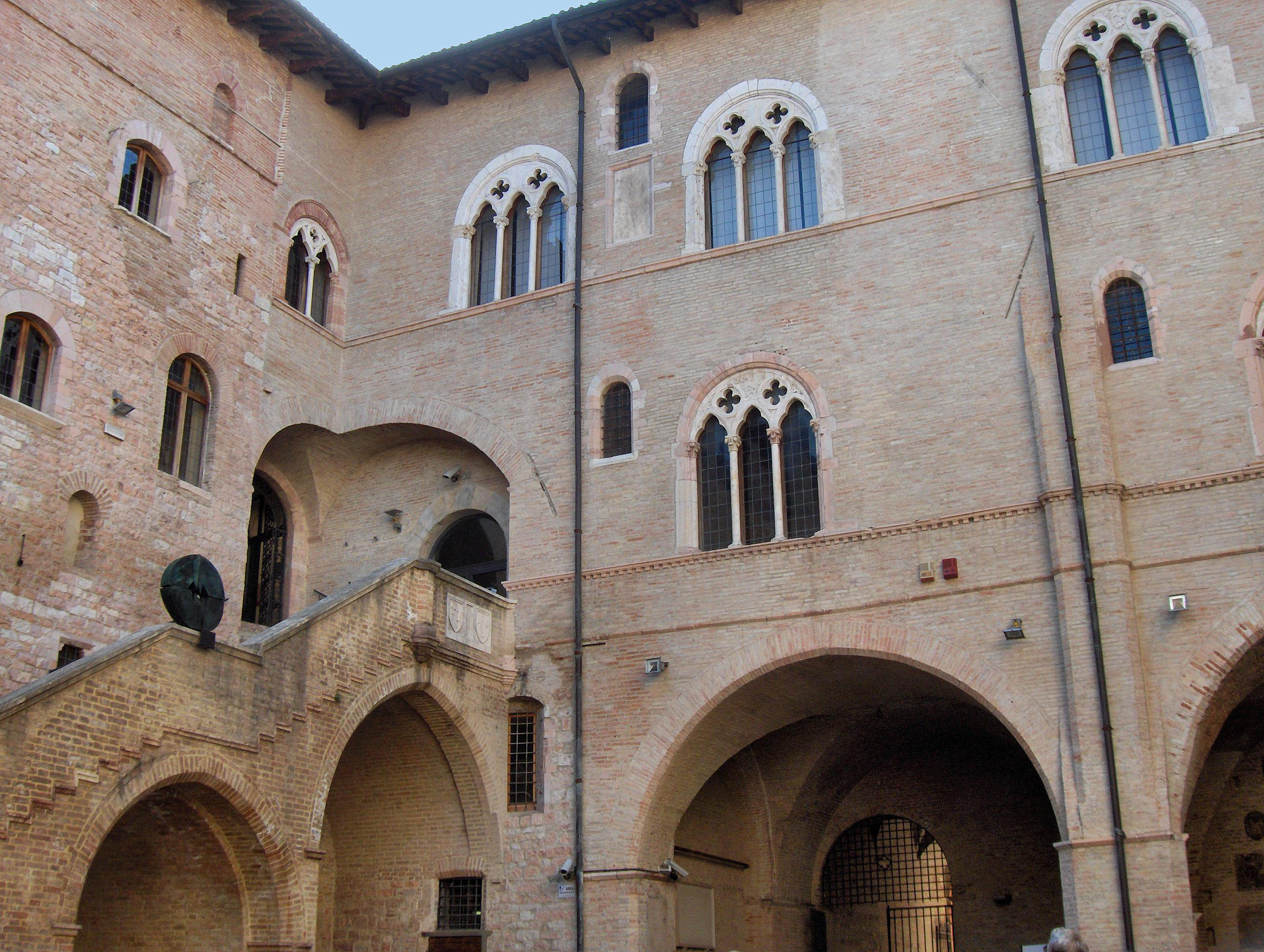
Palazzo Trinci, Foligno

- Palazzo Trinci

== Forlì ==
- Palazzo Hercolani
- Palazzo Sangiorgi

== Gaeta ==
- Gaeta Diocesan Museum

== Garbagna Novarese ==
- Palazzo Caroelli

== Garessio ==
- Reggia di Val Casotto

== Genoa ==
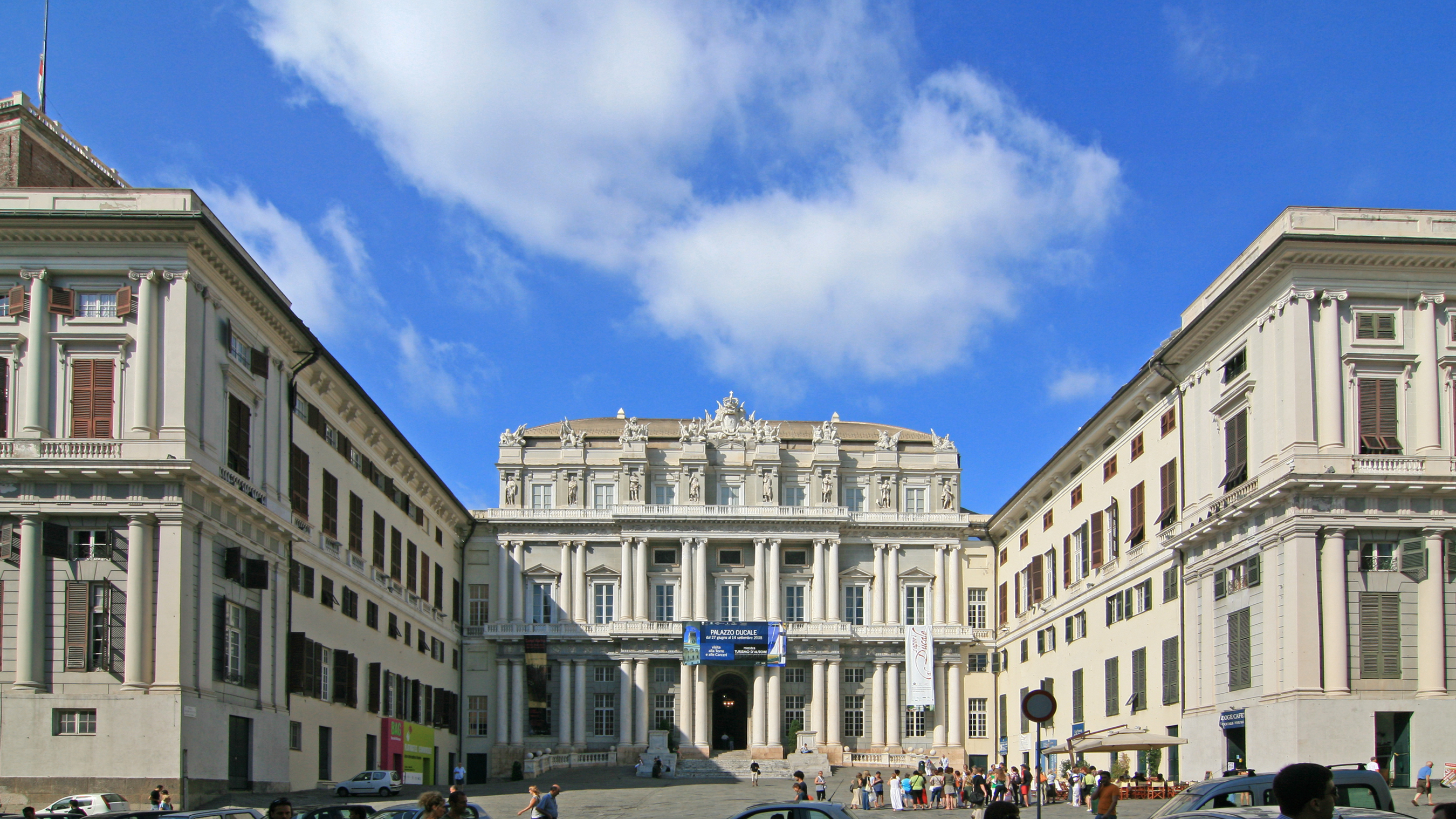
Doge's Palace, Genoa

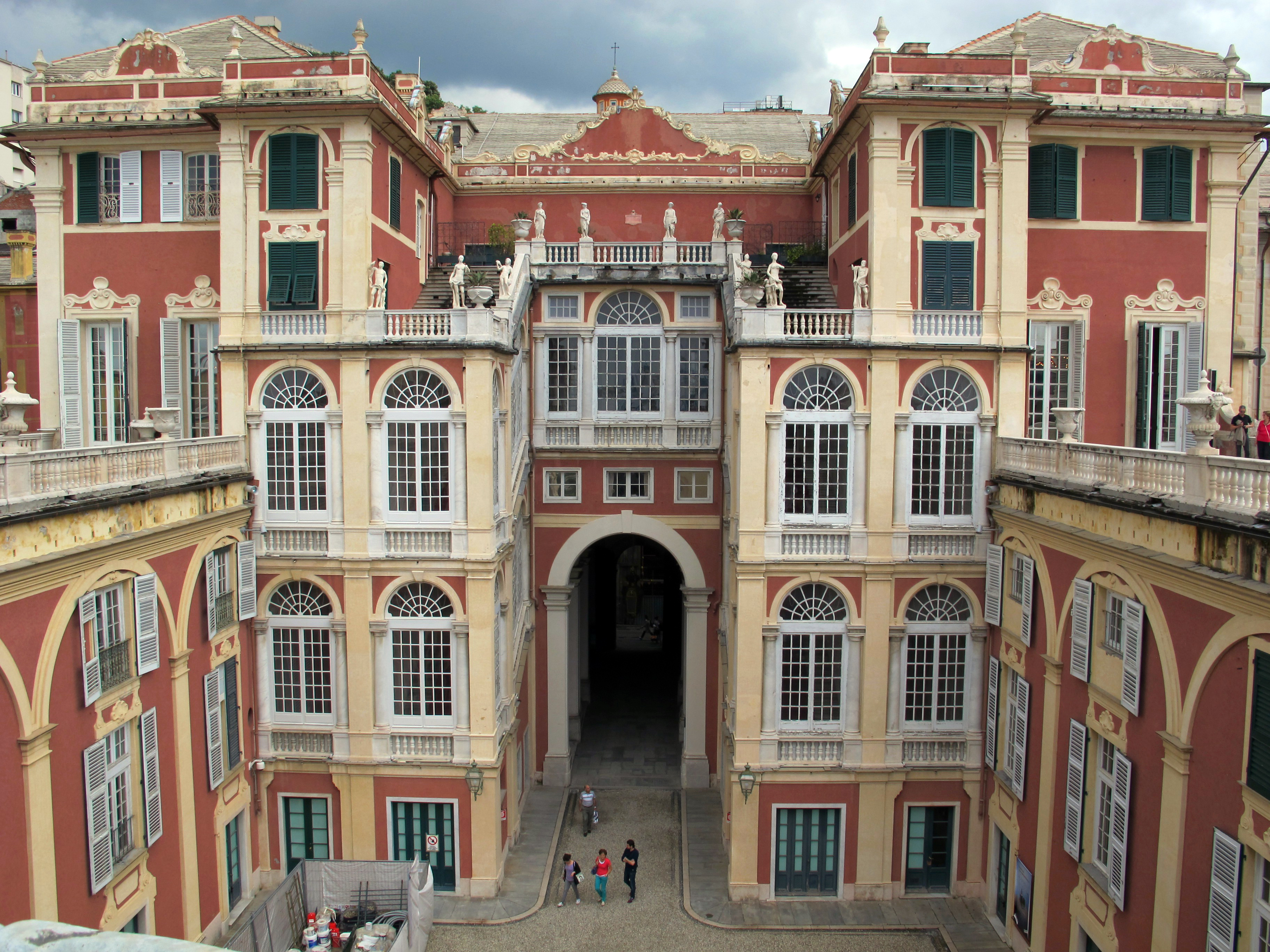
Palazzo Reale, Genoa

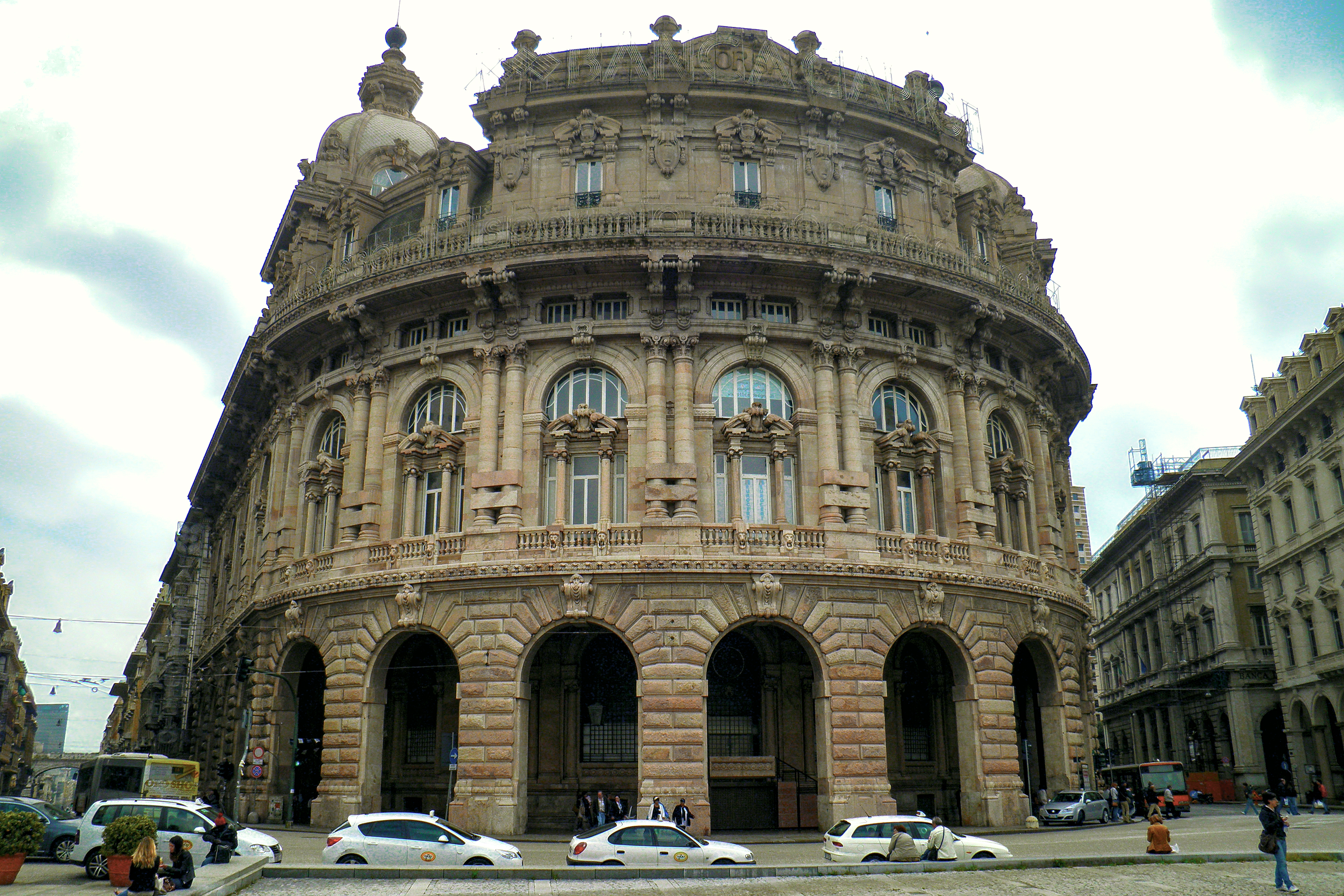
Palazzo della Borsa, Genoa

- Palazzo Durazzo-Pallavicini
- Palazzo Gio Battista Grimaldi (Vico San Luca)
- Palazzo Belimbau
- Palazzo Bianco
- Palazzo Cicala
- Palazzo Doria (Genoa)
- Doge's Palace, Genoa
- Villa Durazzo-Pallavicini
- Palazzo Balbi Piovera Raggio
- Palazzo Nicolosio Lomellino
- Palazzi di Genova
- Palazzo Ambrogio Di Negro
- Palazzo Angelo Giovanni Spinola
- Palazzo Campanella o di Baldassarre Lomellini
- Palazzo Bernardo e Giuseppe De Franchi
- Palazzo Cambiaso Pallavicini
- Palazzo Carrega-Cataldi
- Palazzo Cattaneo Della Volta
- Palazzo Cattaneo-Adorno
- Palazzo Cipriano Pallavicini
- Palazzo Cosmo Centurione
- Palazzo Cristoforo Spinola
- Palazzo della Borsa (Genova)
- Palazzo Gerolamo Grimaldi
- Palazzo Giacomo Lomellini
- Palazzo Giacomo Spinola
- Palazzo Gio Vincenzo Imperiale
- Palazzo Gio. Battista Grimaldi (Piazza San Luca)
- Palazzo Giorgio Centurione
- Palazzo Giorgio Spinola
- Palazzo Interiano Pallavicini
- Palazzo Lercari-Parodi
- Palazzo Lomellini-Doria Lamba
- Palazzo Nicolo Spinola di Luccoli
- Palazzo Pietro Spinola di San Luca
- Palazzo Spinola di Pellicceria
- Palazzo Spinola Gambaro
- Palazzo Stefano De Mari
- Palazzo Tommaso Spinola
- Palazzo Reale (Genoa)
- Palazzo Clemente della Rovere
- Palazzo Doria Spinola
- Palazzo Rosso
- Palazzo San Giorgio

== Grosseto ==
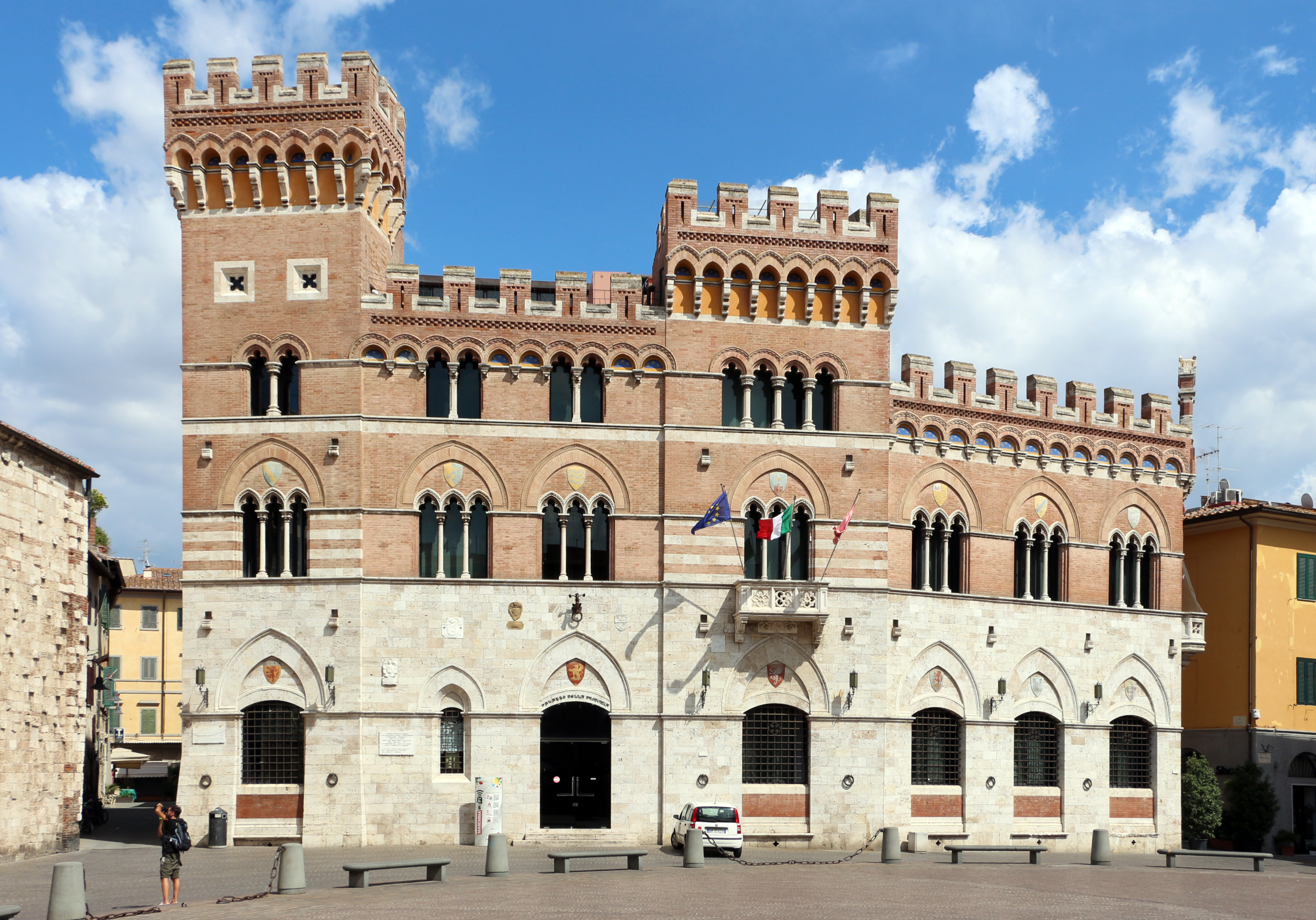
Palazzo Aldobrandeschi, Grosseto

- Palazzo Aldobrandeschi
- Palazzo Comunale
- Palazzo del Genio Civile
- Palazzo del Governo
- Palazzo del Monte dei Paschi
- Palazzo del Vecchio Tribunale
- Palazzo delle Poste
- Palazzo Mensini
- Palazzo Moschini
- Palazzo Tognetti
- Palazzo Vescovile

== Grottaglie ==
- Palazzo de Felice, Grottaglie

== Gubbio ==
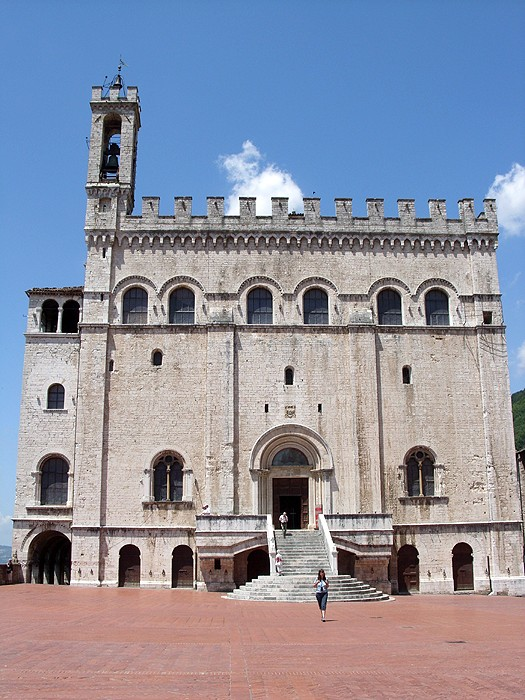
Palazzo dei Consoli, Gubbio

- Palazzo dei Consoli
- Palazzo del Bargello, Gubbio
- Palazzo del Capitano del Popolo, Gubbio

== Imola ==
- Palazzo Tozzoni

== Jesi ==
- Palazzo Pianetti

== L'Aquila ==
- Palazzo Arcivescovile (L'Aquila)
- Palazzo del Convitto
- Palazzetto dei Nobili

== Legnano ==
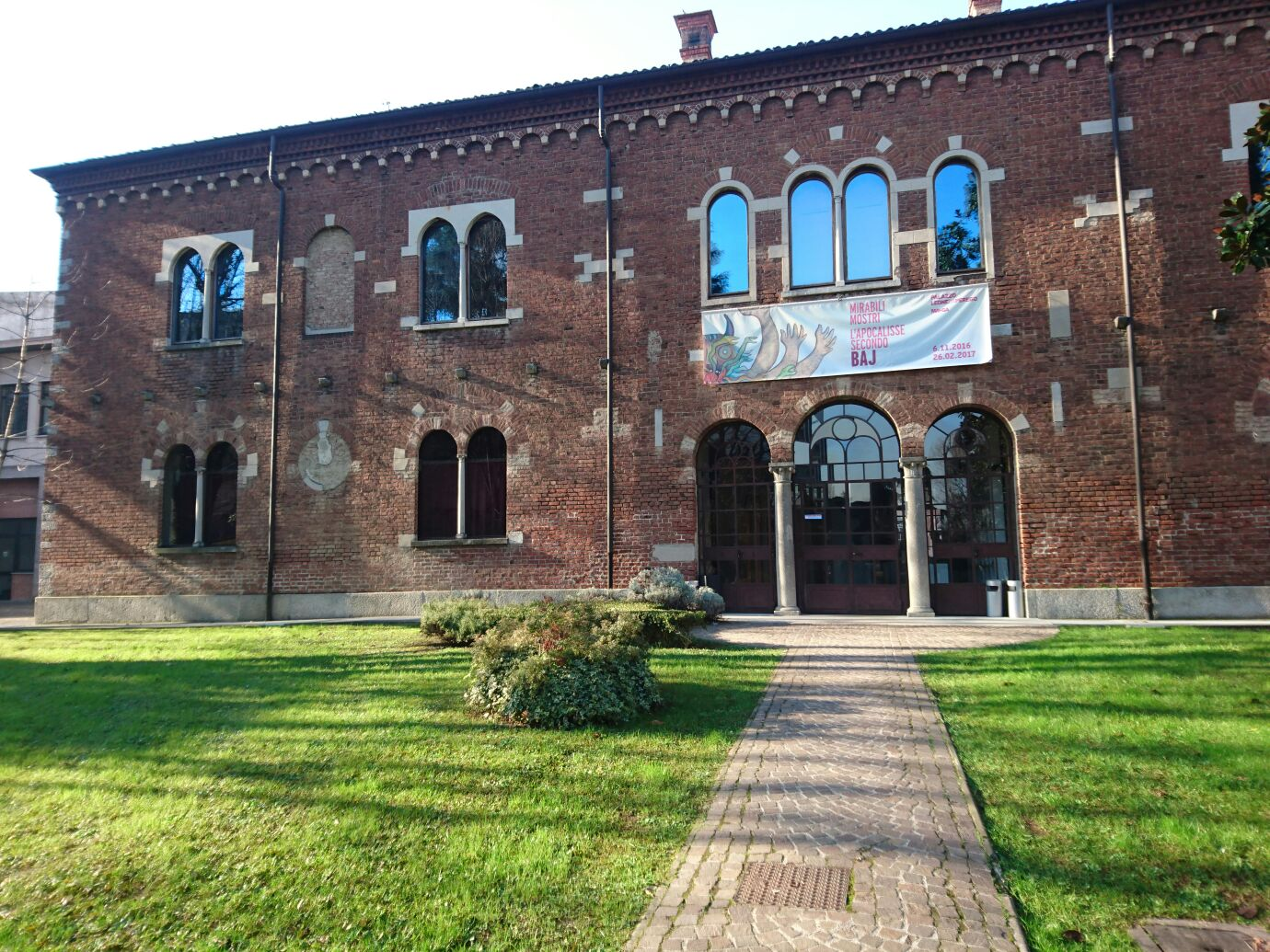
Palazzo Leone da Perego, Legnano

- Palazzo Leone da Perego
- Visconti Castle (Legnano)

== Lucca ==
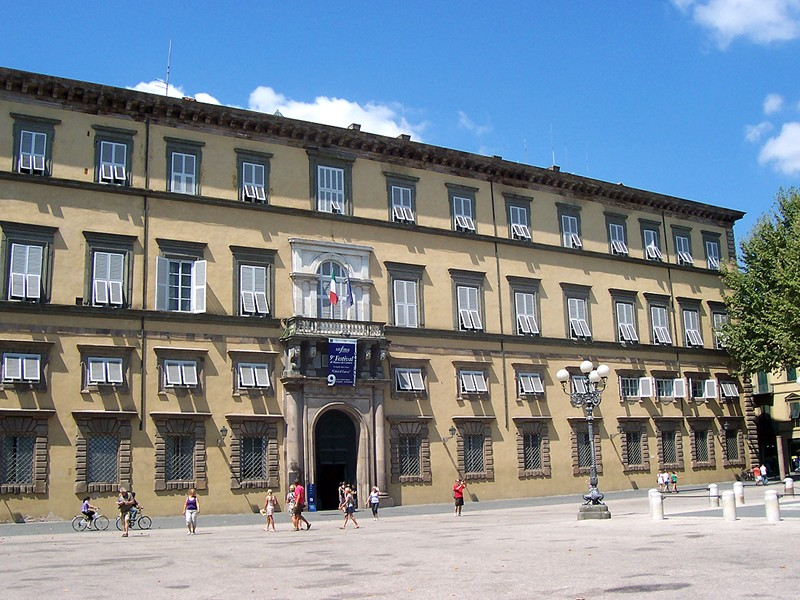
Ducal Palace, Lucca

- Palazzo Mansi
- Palazzo Bernardini
- Palazzo Boccella
- Palazzo Cenami
- Ducal Palace, Lucca
- Guinigi Tower
- Palazzo Guidiccioni
- Palazzo Pretorio, Lucca
- Palazzo Pfanner
- Palazzo Tucci

== Macerata ==
- Palazzo Buonaccorsi
- Palazzo dei Diamanti
- Palazzo Compagnoni Marefoschi, Macerata

== Merate ==
- Palazzo Prinetti, Merate

== Mirandola ==
- Bergomi Palace

== Mantua ==
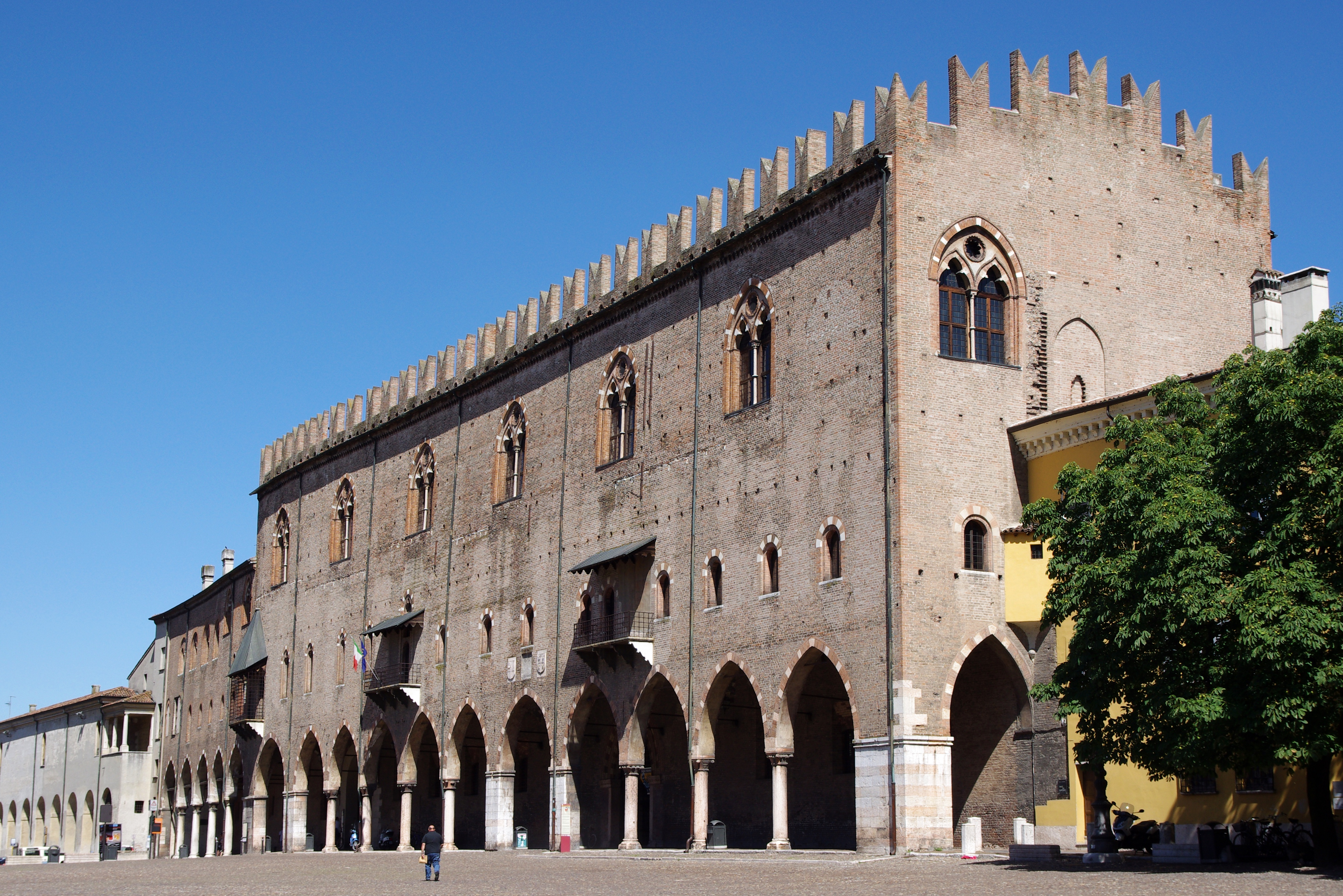
Ducal Palace, Mantua

- Palazzo D'Arco, Mantua
- Palazzo Bonacolsi
- Palazzo Cavriani, Mantua
- Ducal Palace, Mantua
- Palazzo del Podestà, Mantua
- Palazzo San Sebastiano
- Palazzo del Te
- Villa La Favorita

== Marino ==
- Palazzo Colonna (Marino)

== Marmirolo ==
- Palazzina Gonzaghesca di Bosco Fontana

== Matera ==
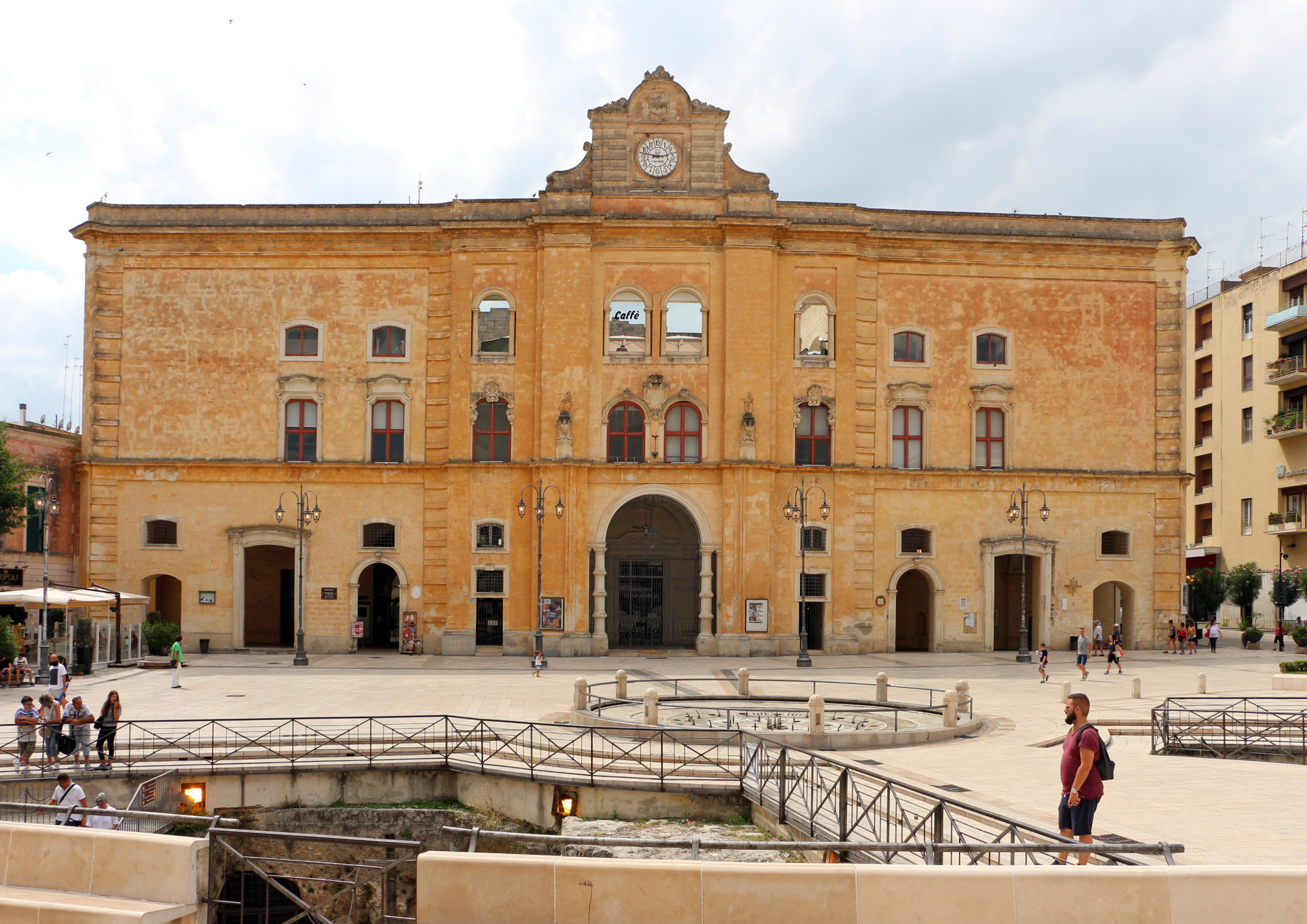
Palazzo dell'Annunziata, Matera

- Palazzo dell'Annunziata

== Messina ==
- Palazzo Calapaj
- Palazzo del Monte di Pietà (Messina)

== Milan ==
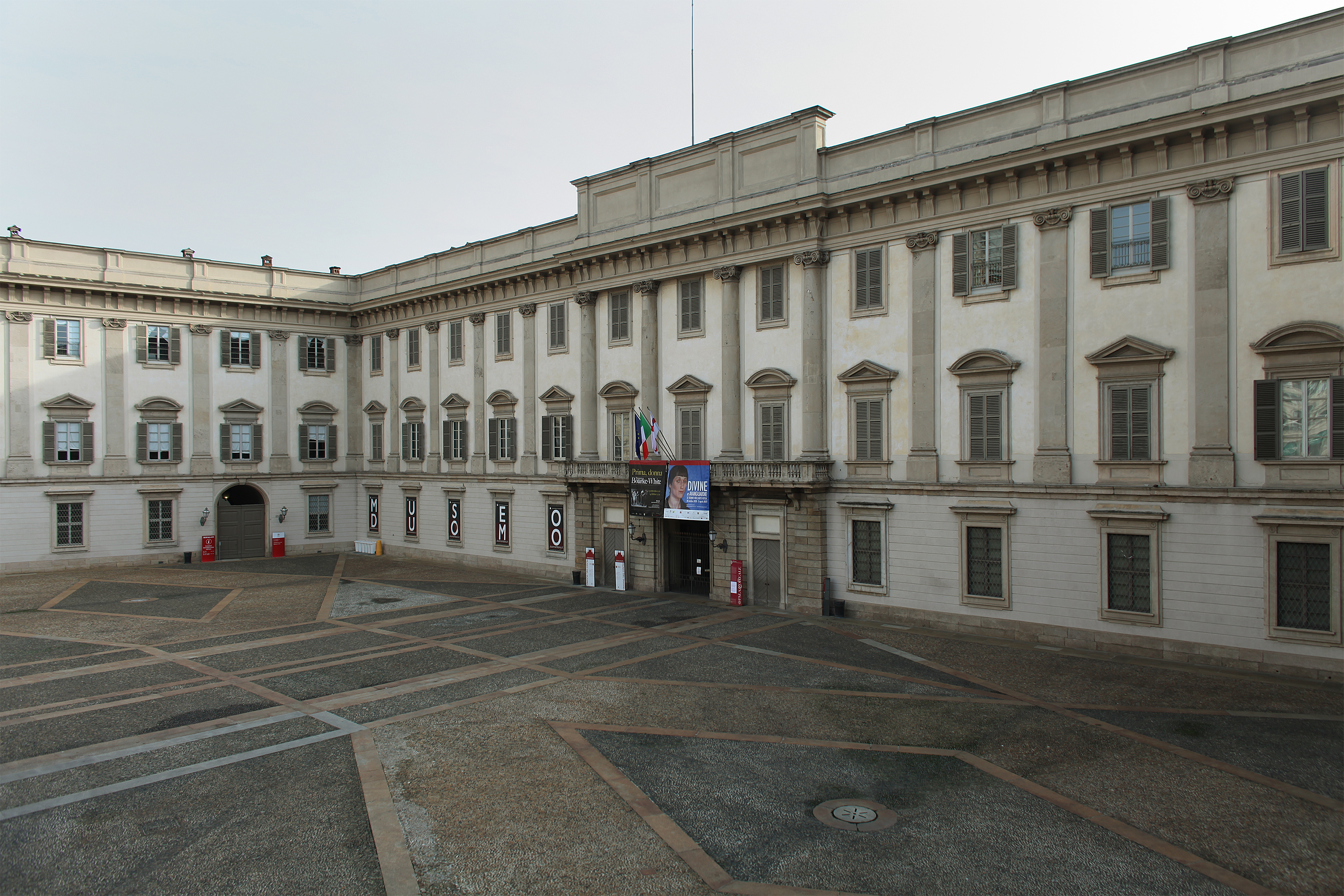
Royal Palace of Milan

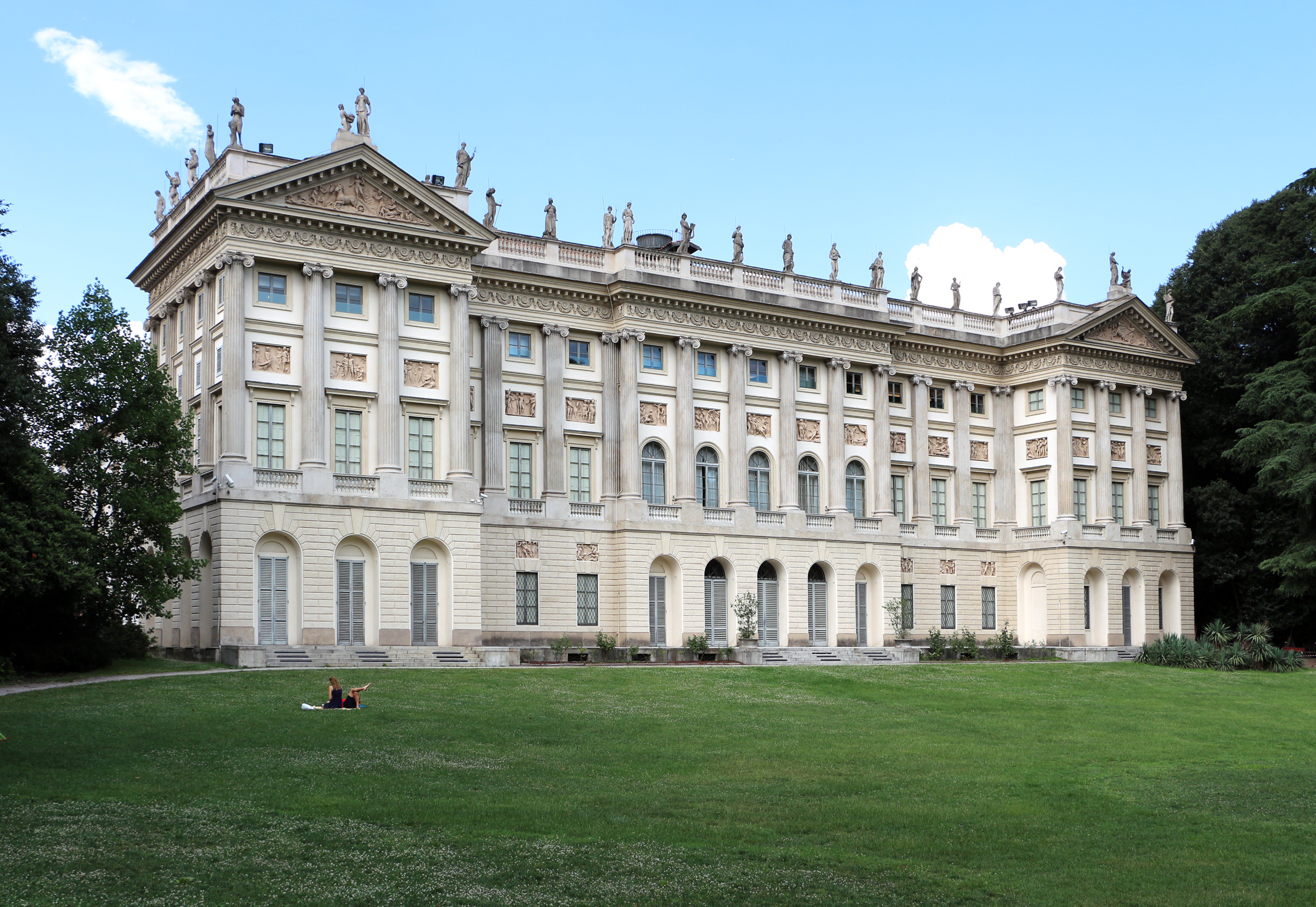
Royal Villa of Milan

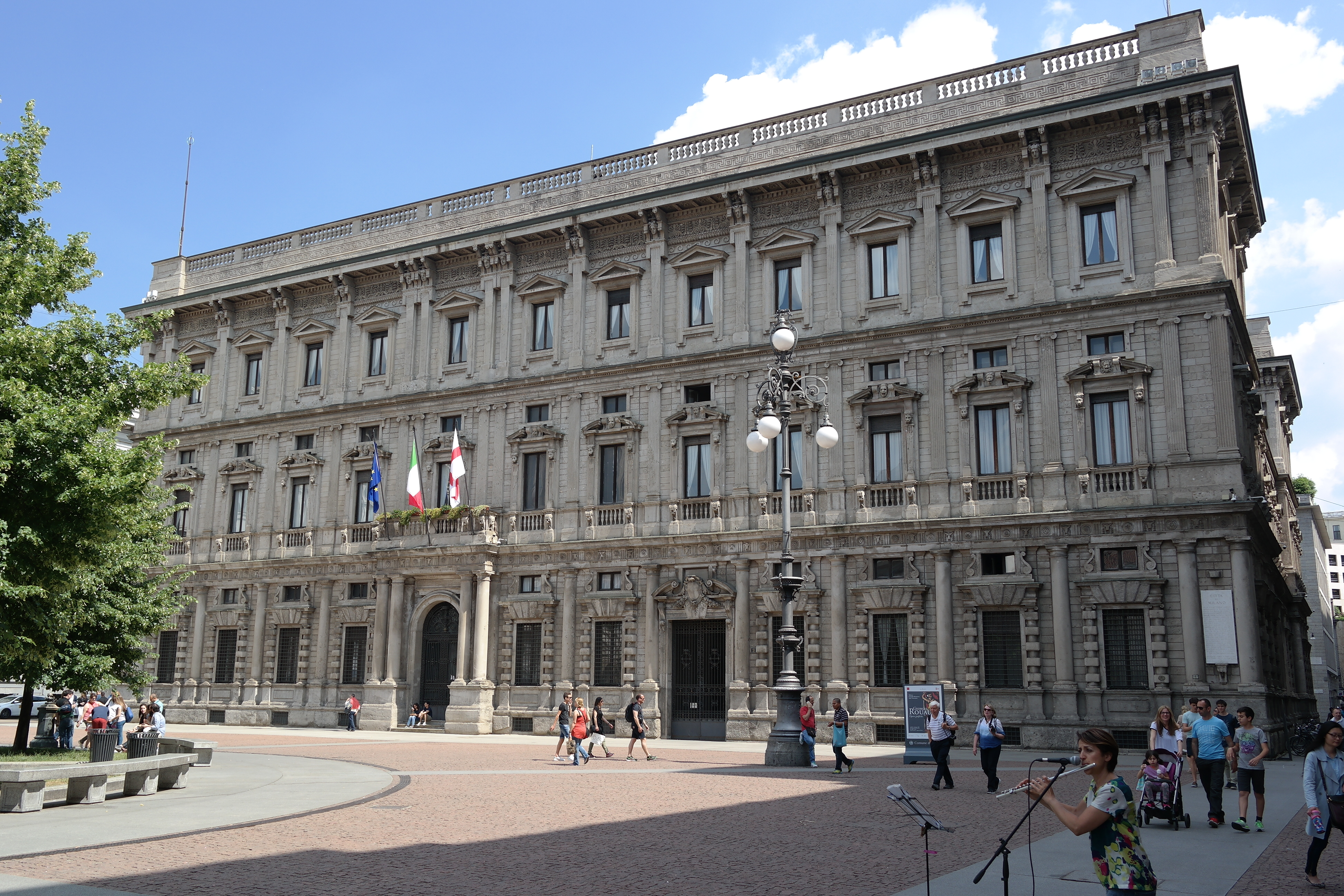
Palazzo Marino, Milan

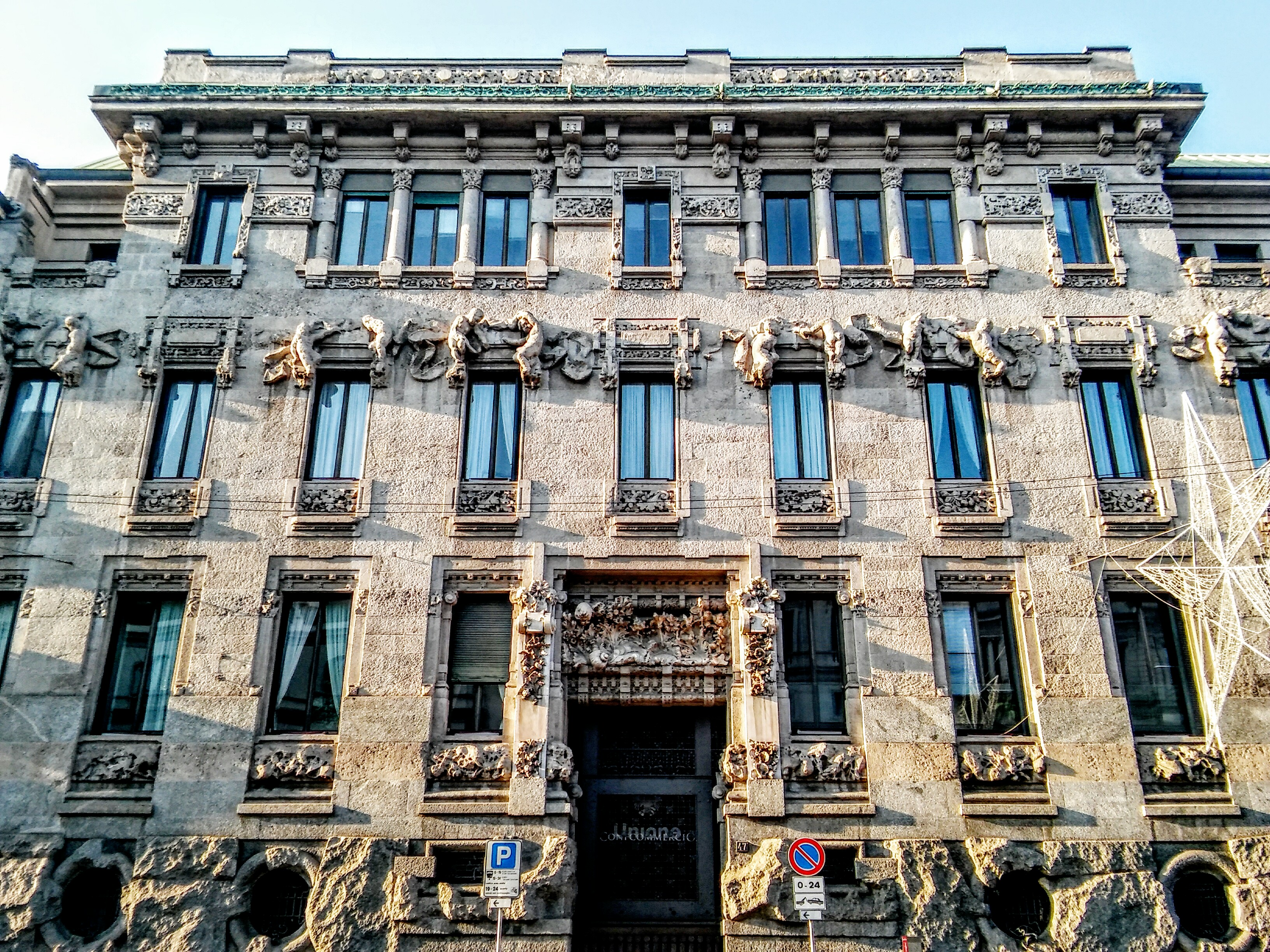
Palazzo Castiglioni, Milan

- Palazzo Anguissola Antona Traversi
- Palazzo Annoni
- Palazzo dell'Arengario
- Bagatti Valsecchi Museum
- Palazzo della Banca Commerciale Italiana
- Palazzo Belgioioso
- Palazzo Borromeo (Milan)
- Palazzo Brentani
- Palazzo Brentano, Corbetta
- Casa Broggi
- Palazzo Carminati, Milan
- Casa Atellani
- Casa Campanini
- Casa Crespi
- Casa dei Grifi (Milano)
- Casa di Riposo per Musicisti
- Casa Fontana-Silvestri
- Casa Guazzoni
- Casa Manzoni
- Casa Panigarola
- Casa Piumi
- Casa Radice Fossati
- Castello Cova
- Palazzo Castiglioni (Milan)
- Palazzo Dugnani
- Palazzo Gavazzi
- Palazzo dei Giureconsulti
- Casa Grondona
- Palazzo INPS, Piazza Missori
- Palazzo Litta, Milan
- Palazzo Luraschi, Milan
- Palazzo Marino
- Palazzo Mellerio, Milan
- Palazzo Melzi d'Eril, Milan
- Palazzo Melzi di Cusano
- Palazzo Mezzanotte
- Palazzo del Monte di Pietà (Milano)
- Palazzo Moriggia
- Casa degli Omenoni
- Palazzo Orsini, Milan
- Palazzina Appiani
- Palazzo Acerbi
- Palazzo Arese
- Palazzo Arese Bethlen
- Palazzo Borromeo d'Adda
- Palazzo Brera
- Palazzo Calchi
- Palazzo Carcassola Grandi
- Palazzo Carmagnola
- Palazzo Castani
- Palazzo Cusani (Milano)
- Palazzo Dal Verme
- Palazzo del Banco Mediceo
- Palazzo di Prospero Visconti
- Palazzo Isimbardi
- Palazzo Marietti
- Palazzo Recalcati
- Palazzo Sormani
- Palazzo Spinola (Milano)
- Palazzo Visconti di Grazzano
- Palazzo Pozzi Besana, Milan
- Palazzo della Ragione, Milan
- Villa Romeo Faccanoni
- Royal Palace of Milan
- Palazzo Saporiti
- Ca' de Sass
- Palazzo delle Scuole Palatine
- Palazzo del Senato (Milan)
- Palazzo Serbelloni
- Palazzo Stampa di Soncino, Milan
- State Archives of Milan
- Palazzo Tarsis
- Palazzo Taverna, Milan
- Villa Belgiojoso Bonaparte
- Villas and palaces in Milan

== Modena ==
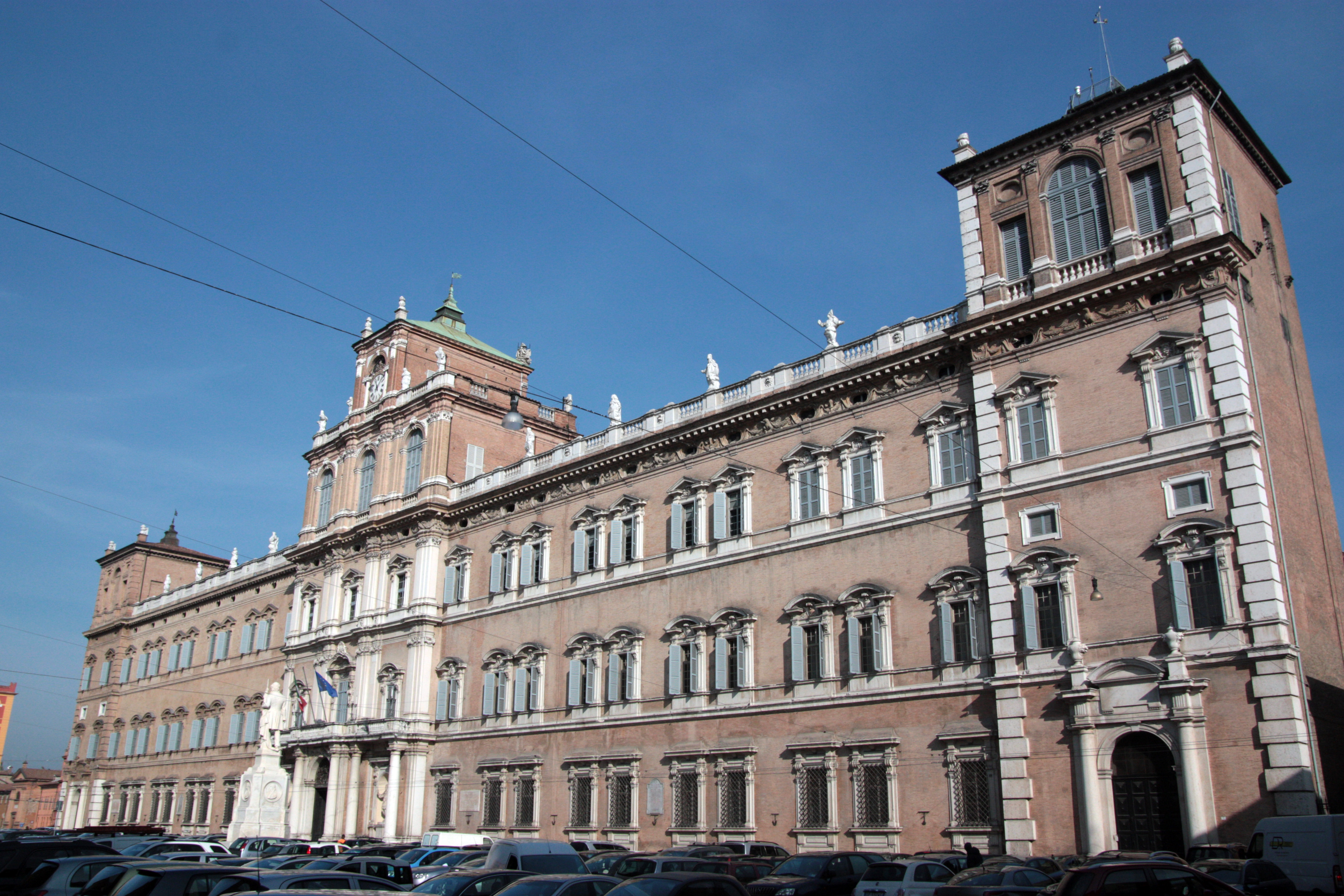
Ducal Palace of Modena

- Ducal Palace of Modena – Now a military academy
- Palazzo Santa Margherita
- Palazzo di Musei

== Modica ==
- Mercedari Palace

== Moncalieri ==
- Moncalieri Castle

== Montirone ==
- Palazzo Lechi, Montirone

== Montepulciano ==
- Palazzo Contucci
- Palazzo Gagnati

== Naples ==
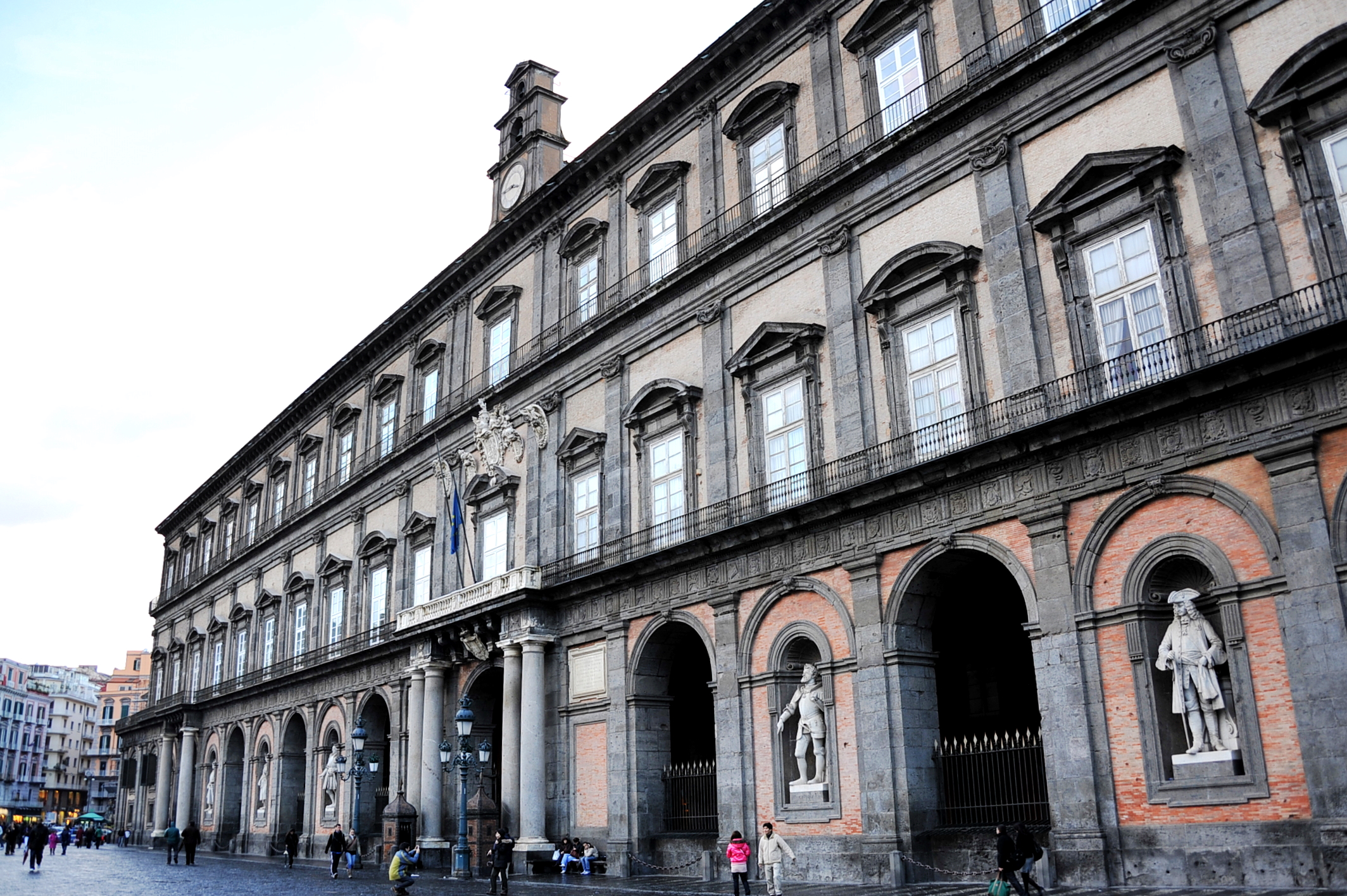
Royal Palace of Naples

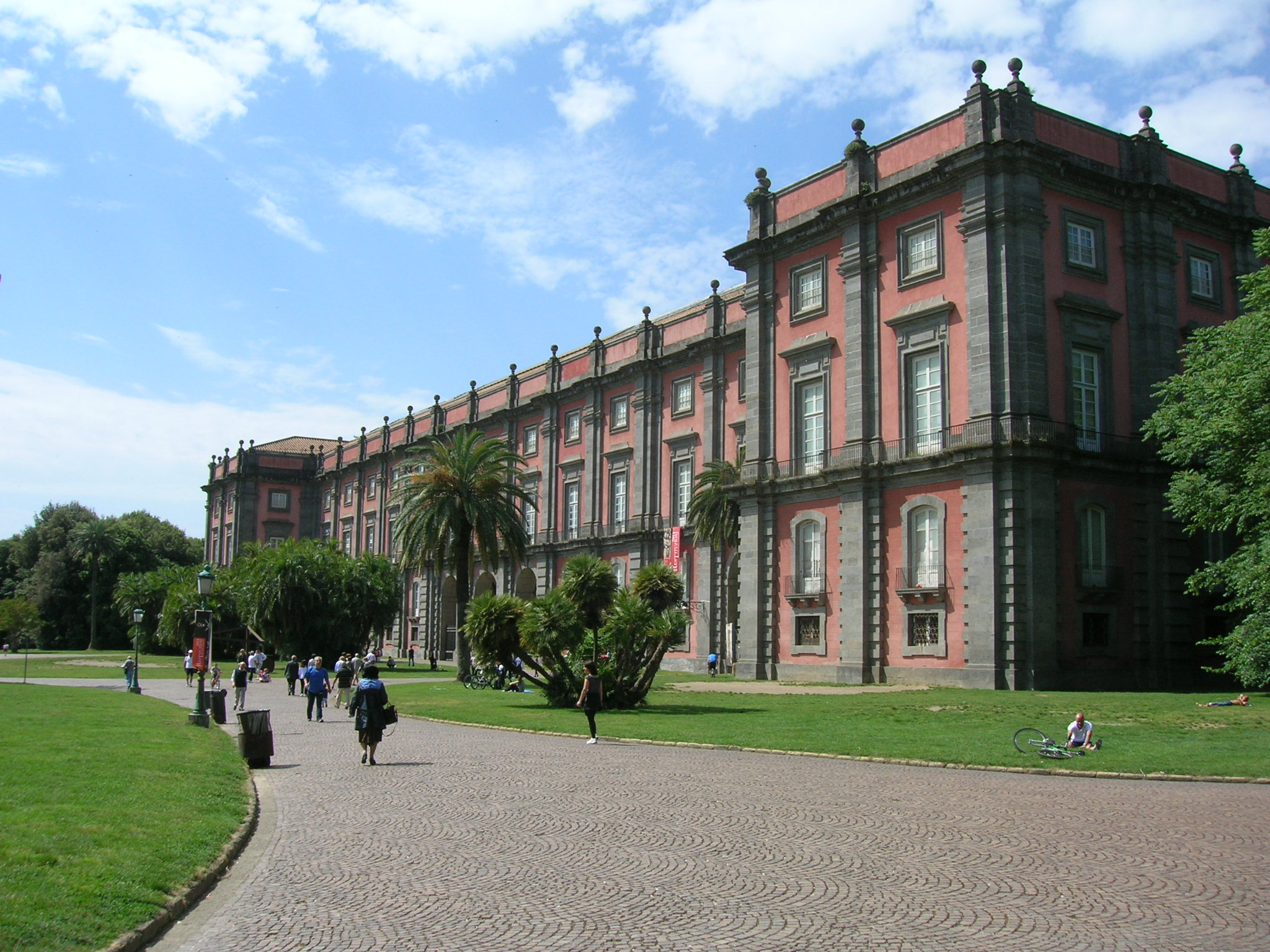
Royal Palace of Capodimonte, Naples

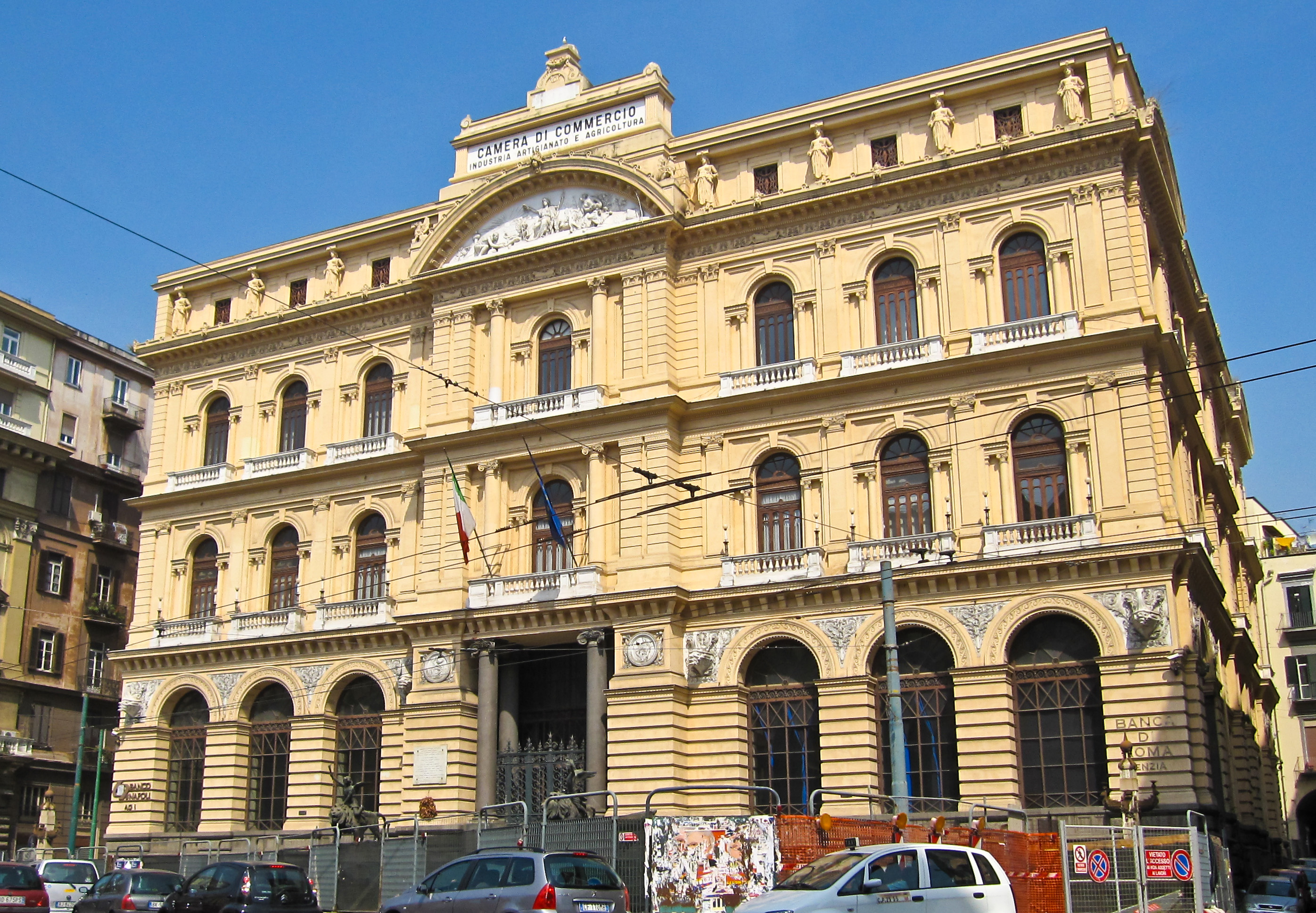
Palazzo della Borsa, Naples

- Palazzo d'Afflitto
- Palazzo d'Aquino di Caramanico, Naples
- Archbishop's Palace (Naples)
- Palace of the Bank of Italy (Naples)
- Palazzo Barbaja, Naples
- Palazzo della Borsa, Naples
- Palazzo Buono
- Royal Palace of Capodimonte
- Palazzo Carafa della Spina
- Palazzo Diomede Carafa
- Palazzo Caravita di Sirignano
- Palazzo Cellammare, Naples
- Villa Donn'Anna
- Palazzo Doria d'Angri
- Palazzo Firrao, Naples
- Palazzo Giordano a Via Medina, Naples
- Palace of the Immacolatella, Naples
- Palazzo Latilla, Naples
- Palazzo di Ludovico di Bux a via Nilo, Naples
- Palazzo Marigliano, Naples
- Monte di Pietà, Naples
- Museo Civico Filangieri
- Palazzo della Casa del Mutilato, Naples
- Palazzo Orsini di Gravina
- Ospedale L'Albergo Reale dei Poveri, Naples
- Palazzo San Giacomo, Naples
- Palazzo del Panormita
- Palazzo Partanna, Naples
- Palazzo Pignatelli di Monteleone, Naples
- Palazzo delle Poste, Naples
- Palazzo della Prefettura, Naples
- Palazzo della Questura, Naples
- Palazzo Ravaschieri di Satriano
- Palazzo Ricca, Naples
- Villa Rocca Matilde
- Royal Palace of Naples
- Palazzo San Felice, Naples
- Palazzo di Sangro
- Palazzo di Sangro di Casacalenda, Naples
- Palazzo Serra di Cassano
- Palazzo dello Spagnolo, Naples
- Palazzo Spinelli di Laurino, Naples
- Palazzo Venezia, Naples
- Palazzo Zevallos Stigliano

== Navelli ==
- Palazzo Santucci

== Nicosia ==
- Palazzo Cirino, Nicosia

== Novara ==
- Faraggiana Ferrandi Natural History Museum

== Orvieto ==
- Palazzo Gualterio

== Padua ==
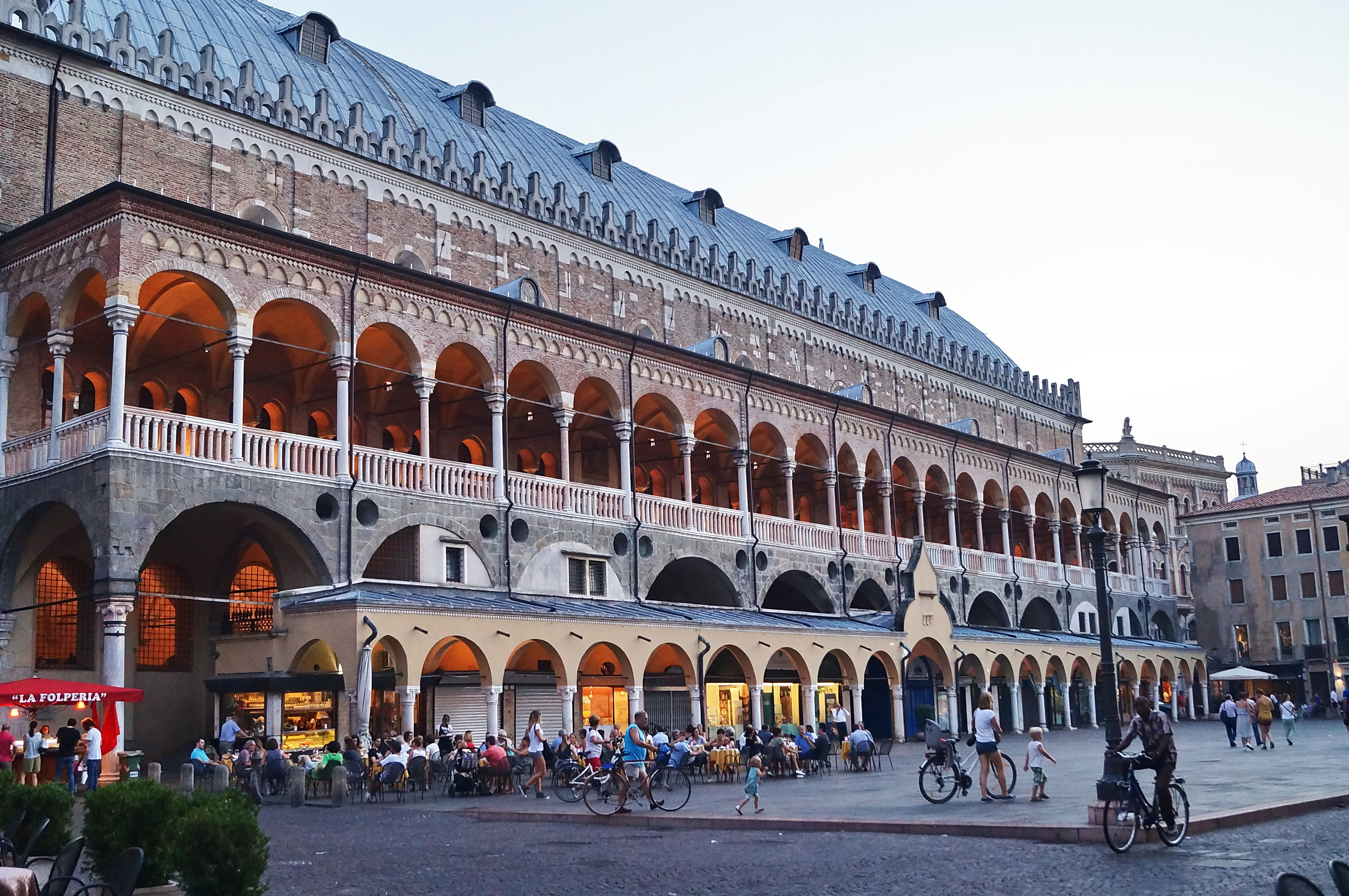
Palazzo della Ragione, Padua

- Bo Palace
- Museum of Precinema
- Palazzo Mussato
- Palazzo Cavalli alle Porte Contarine
- Palazzo Liviano
- Palazzo Maldura
- Palazzo Papafava dei Carraresi
- Palazzo Vescovile, Padua
- Palazzo della Ragione, Padua
- Palazzo Vigodarzere, Padua
- Palazzo Zabarella
- Palazzo Zuckermann, Padua

== Palermo ==
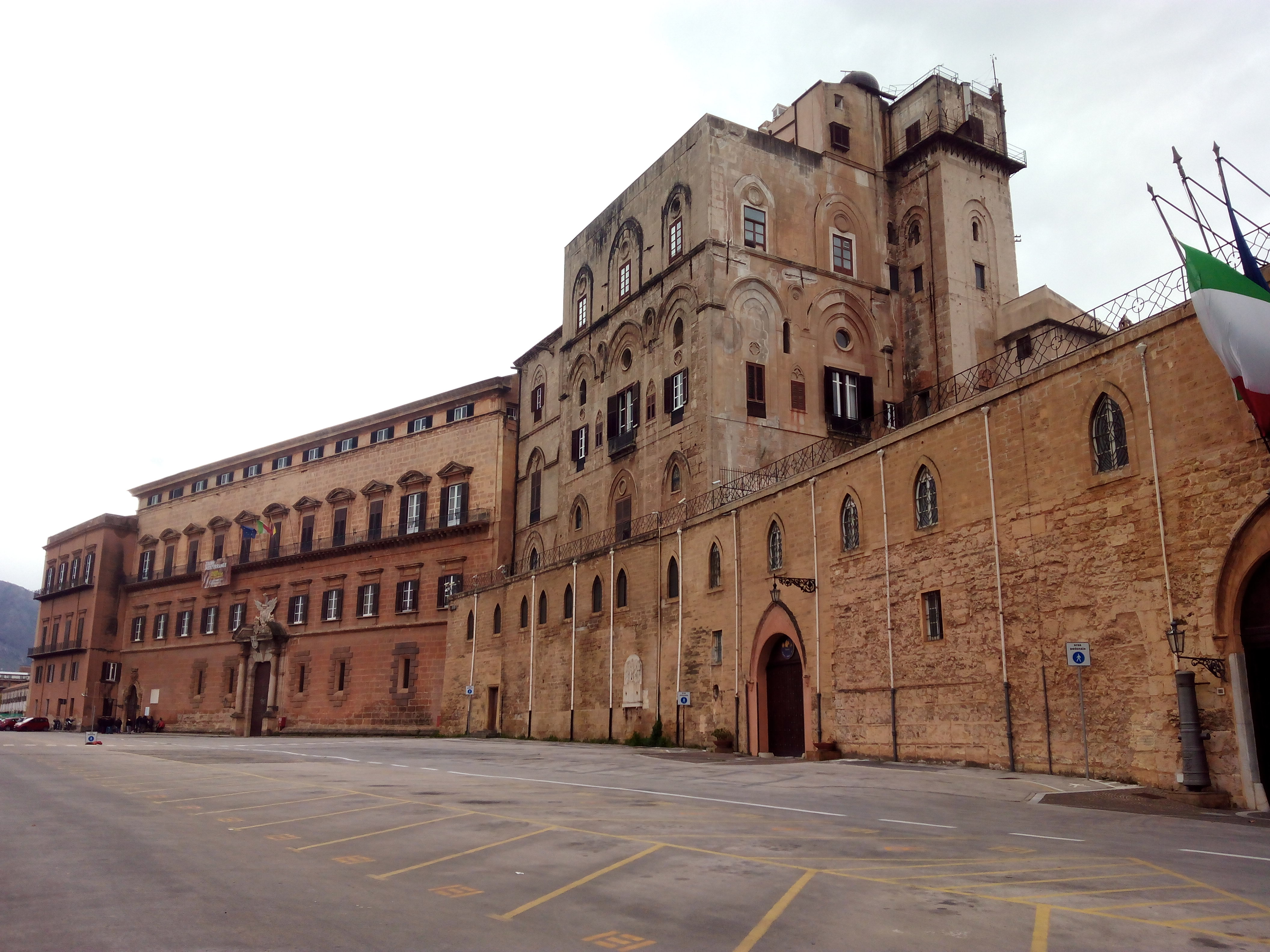
Palazzo dei Normanni, Palermo

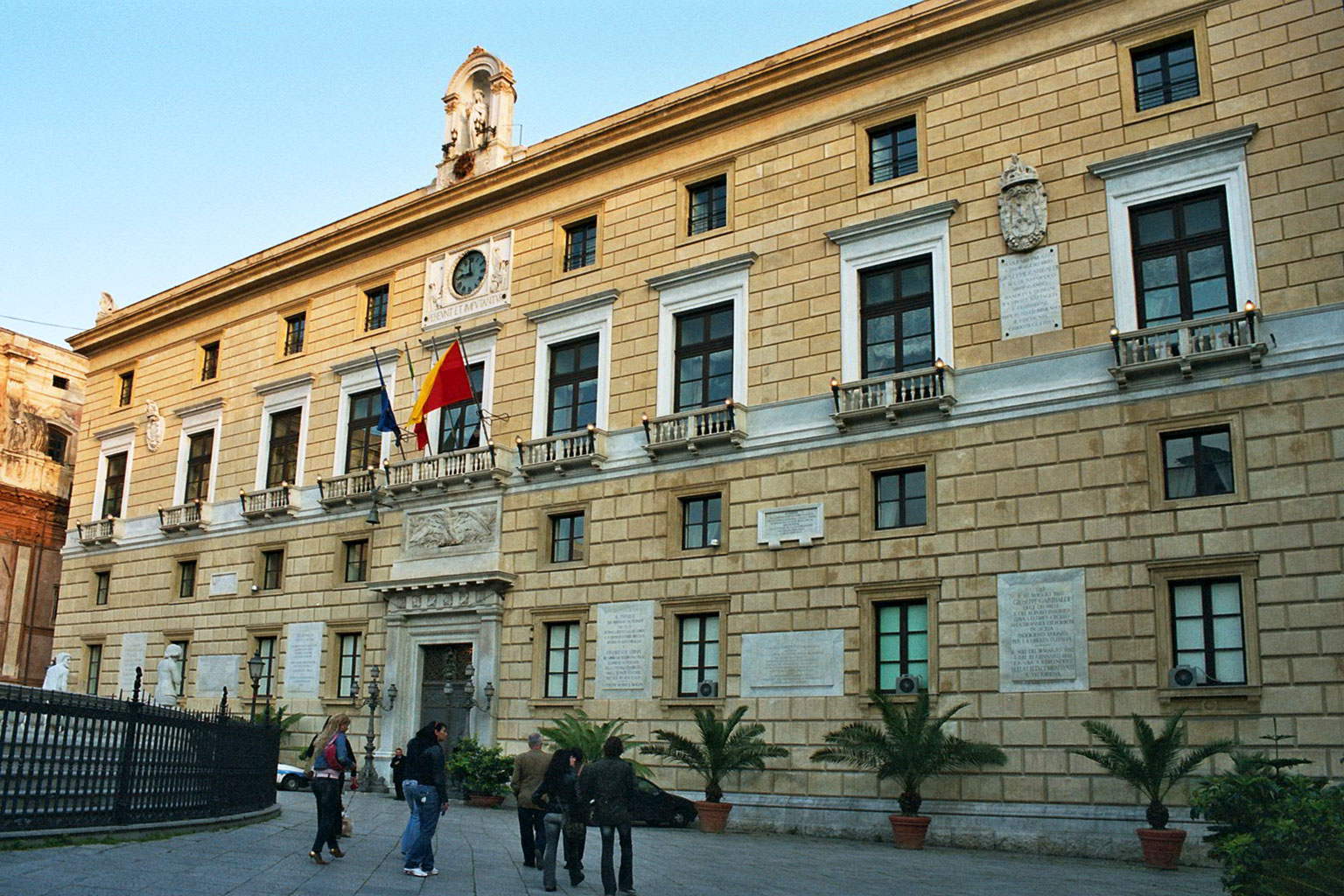
Palazzo Pretorio, Palermo

- Palazzo Abatellis
- Palazzo Ajutamicristo
- Palazzo Alliata di Villafranca
- Palazzo Asmundo, Palermo
- Palazzo Bonagia
- Palazzo Bonocore, Palermo
- Palazzo Branciforte, Palermo
- Palazzo Butera, Palermo
- Palazzo Celestri di Santacroce
- Palazzo Cesarò Colonna
- Palazzo Chiaramonte
- Palazzina Cinese
- Palazzo Comitini
- Cuba Palace
- Palazzo Filangeri-Cutò, Palermo
- Palazzo Forcella de Seta
- Palazzo Isnello
- Palazzo Jung, Palermo
- Palazzo Marchesi, Palermo
- Castello di Maredolce
- Palazzo Natoli
- Palazzo dei Normanni
- Palazzo Pretorio, Palermo
- Palazzo Speciali Raffadali
- Palazzo Riso
- Palazzo Sclafani
- Castello Utveggio
- Palazzo Valguarnera-Gangi
- Zisa, Palermo
- Villa Zito

== Parma ==
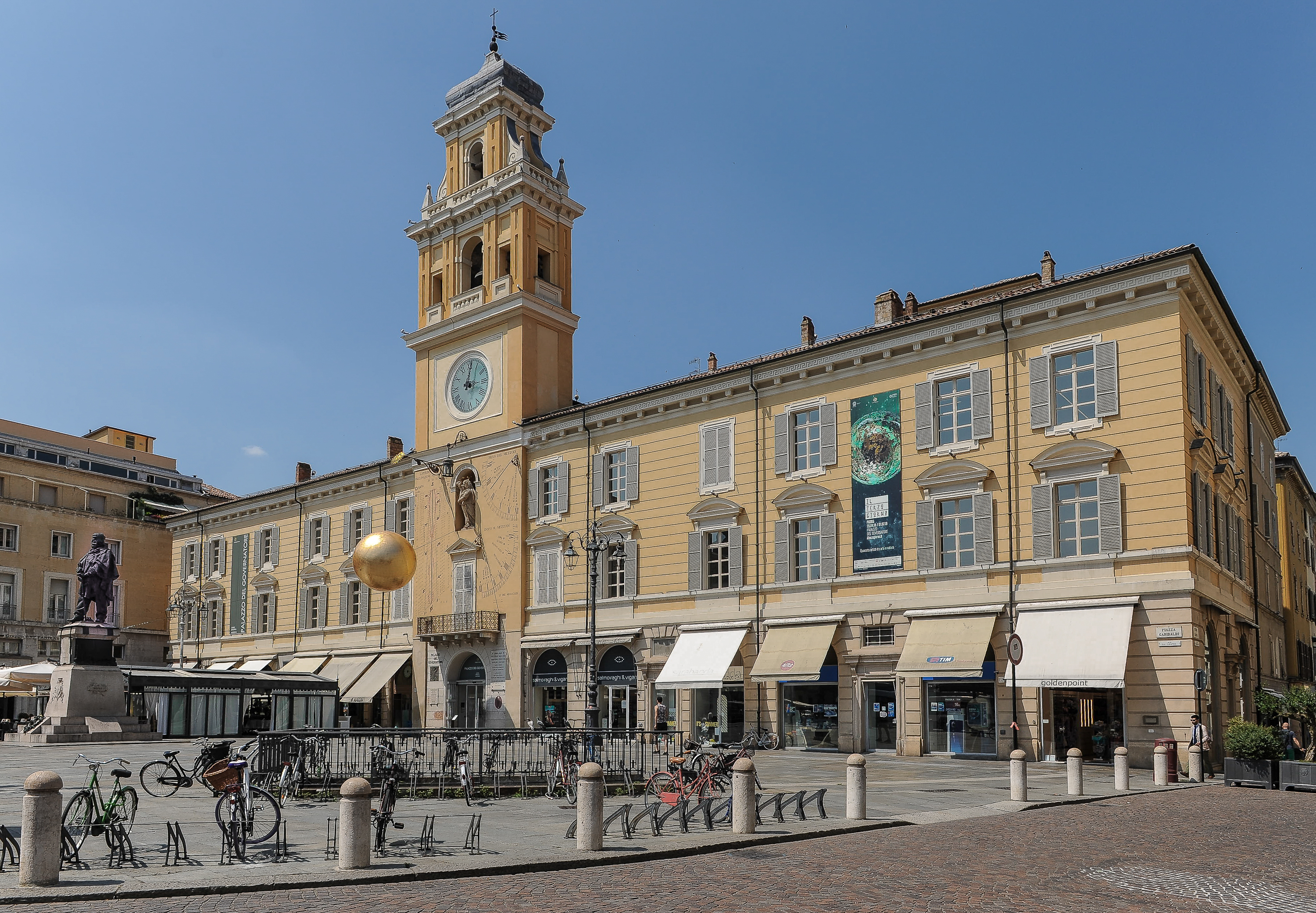
Palazzo del Governatore, Parma

- Palazzo del Governatore, Parma
- Palazzo Cusani, Parma
- Ducal Palace of Parma
- Palazzo del Giardino
- Palazzo Pigorini
- Palazzo della Pilotta
- Palazzo di Riserva
- Palazzo Sanvitale
- Palazzo Venturini

== Pavia ==
- Palazzo Botta Adorno
- Palazzo Malaspina, Pavia
- Palazzo Bellisomi Vistarino
- Palazzo del Maino
- Palazzo Mezzabarba
- Visconti Castle (Pavia)

== Perugia ==
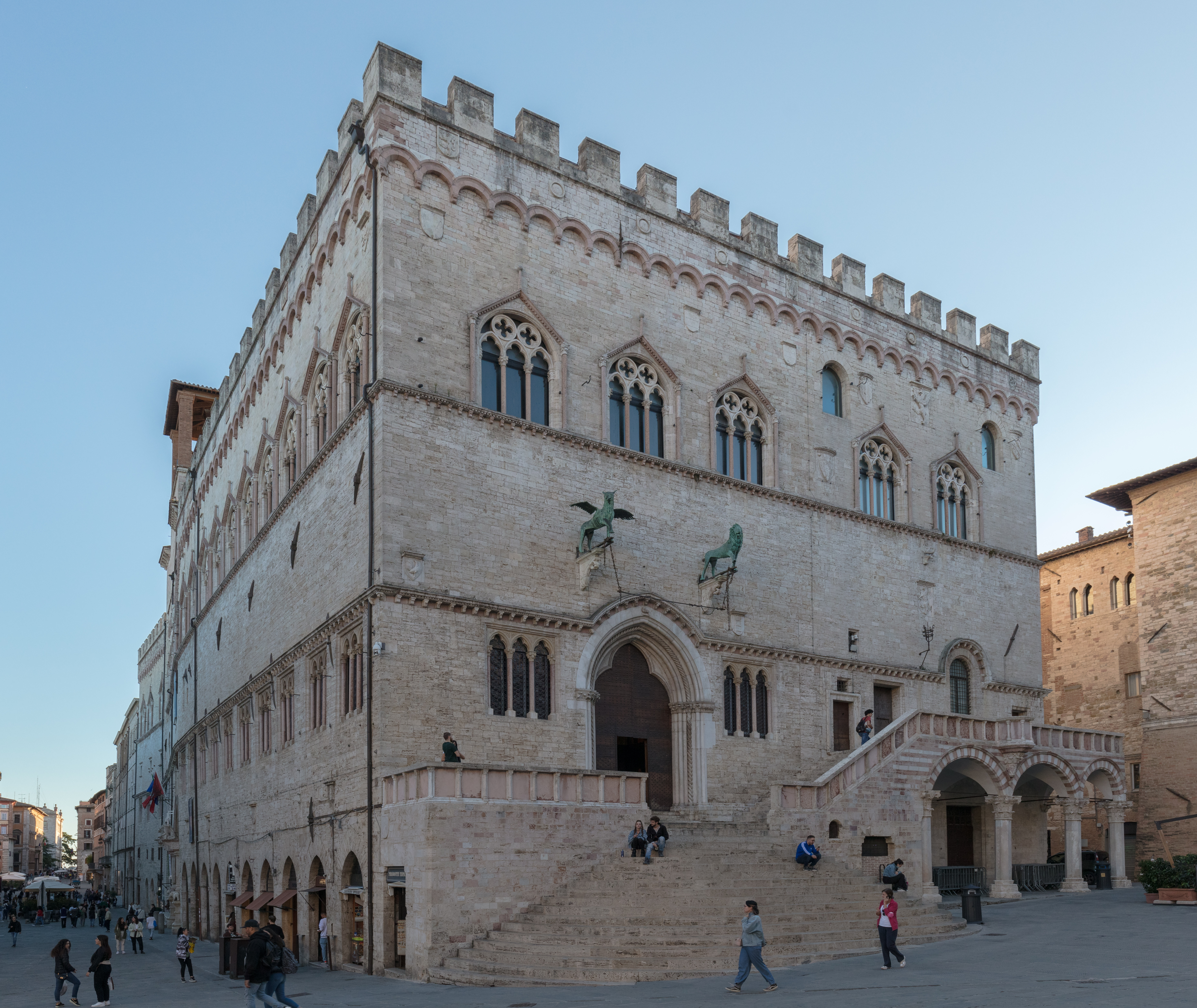
Palazzo dei Priori, Perugia

- Palazzo del Municipo
- Palazzo dei Priori
- Palazzo della Provincia e della Prefettura
- Palazzo Donini

== Pesaro ==
- Ducal Palace of Pesaro
- Civic Museum of Palazzo Mosca
- Palazzo Olivieri–Machirelli
- Palazzo Baldassini, Pesaro
- Palazzo Montani Antaldi, Pesaro

== Piacenza ==
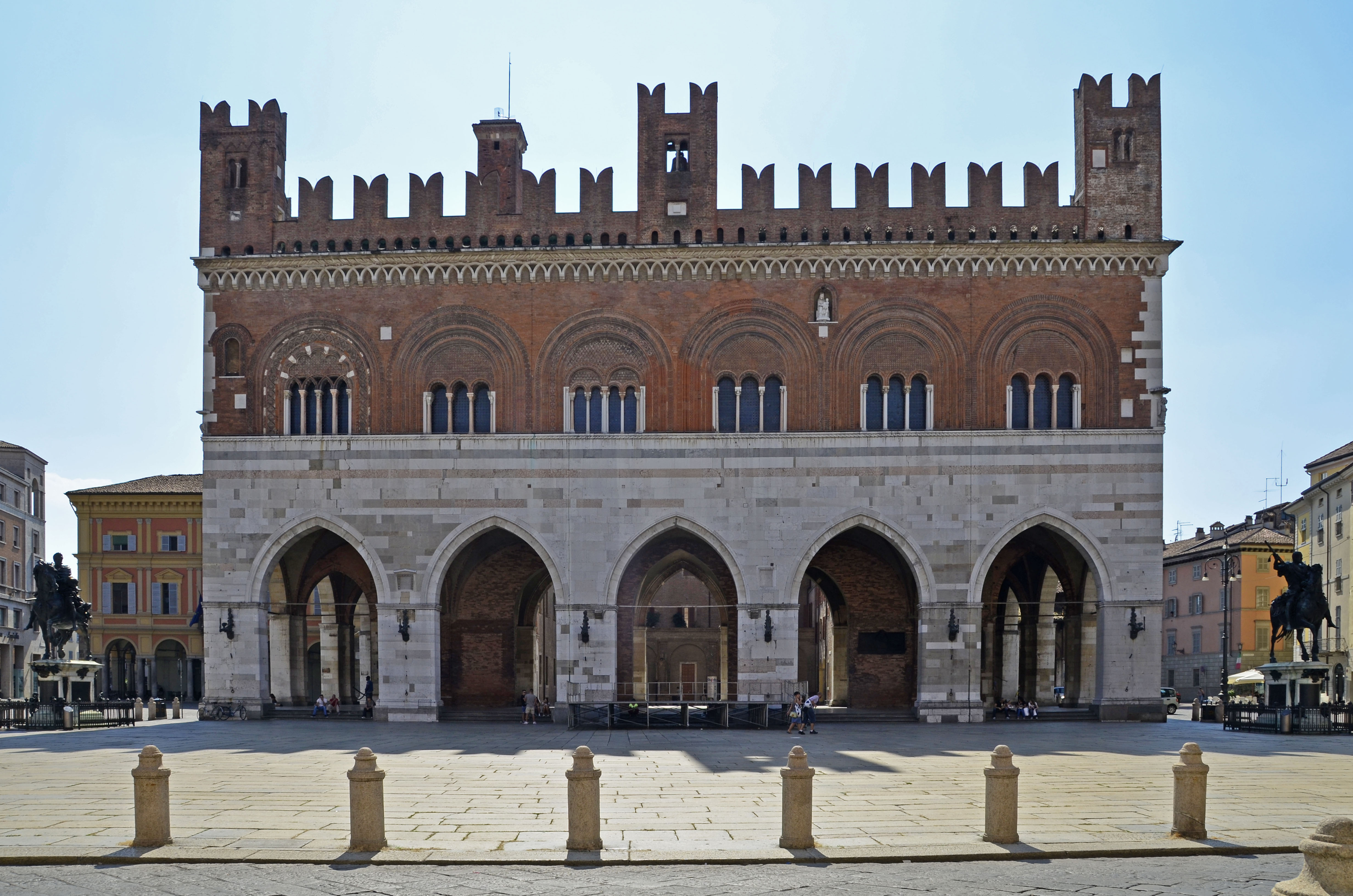
Palazzo Comunale, Piacenza

- Palazzo Farnese
- Palazzo dei Mercanti
- Palazzo Comunale, Piacenza
- Palazzo Costa
- Palazzo della Prefettura, Piacenza

== Pienza ==
- Palazzo Piccolomini
- Palazzo Pubblico

== Piove di Sacco ==
- Palace Priuli Ballan

== Pisa ==
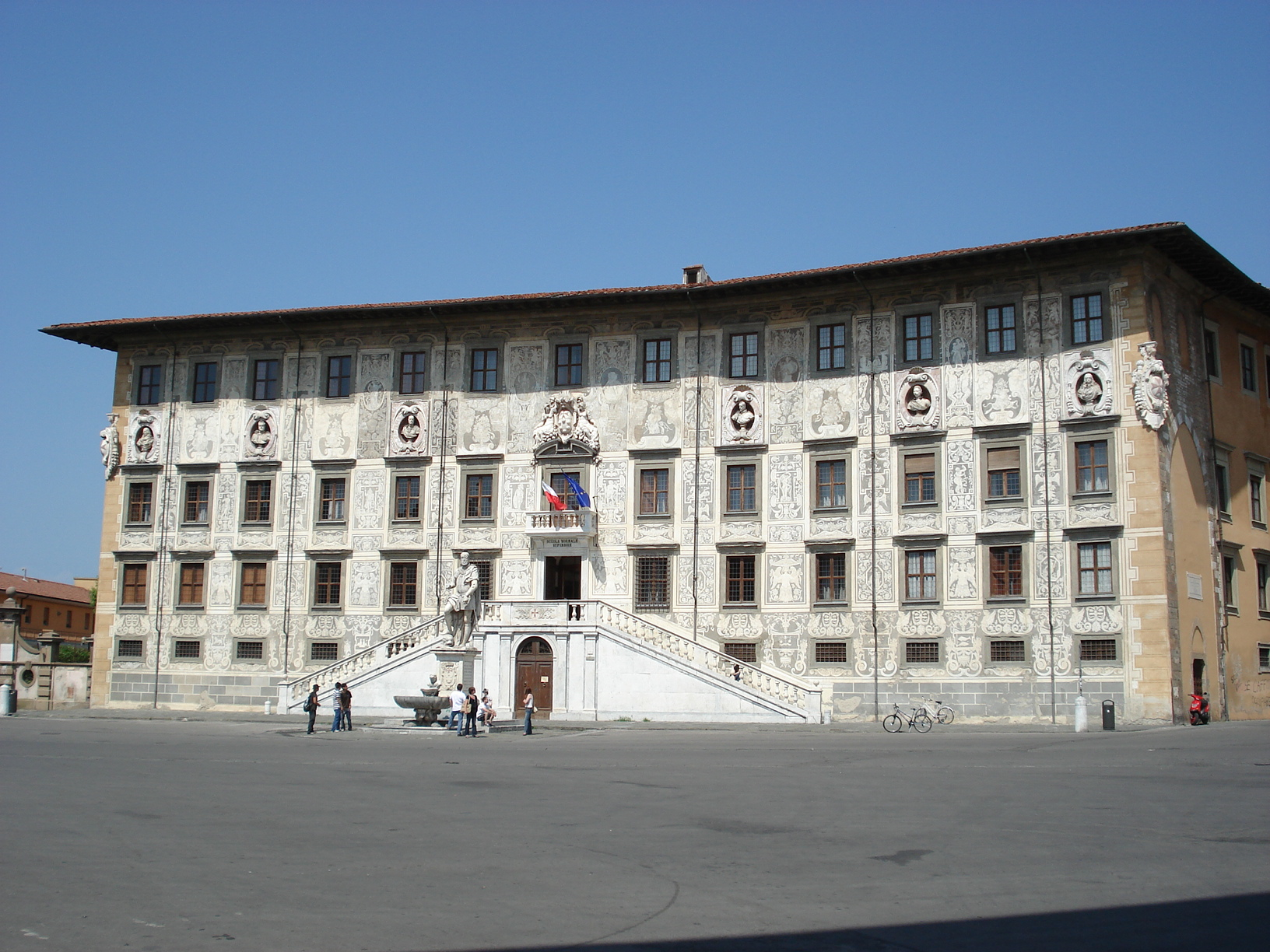
Palazzo della Carovana, Pisa

- Palazzo della Carovana
- Palazzo del Collegio Puteano
- Palazzo Lanfranchi, Pisa
- Palazzo Lanfranchi-Toscanelli
- Palazzo Lanfreducci
- Palazzo Blu
- Palazzo Grifoni (San Miniato)
- Palazzotto Specola, Pisa
- Palazzo Vecchio de' Medici, Pisa
- Palazzo delle Vedove

== Pistoia ==
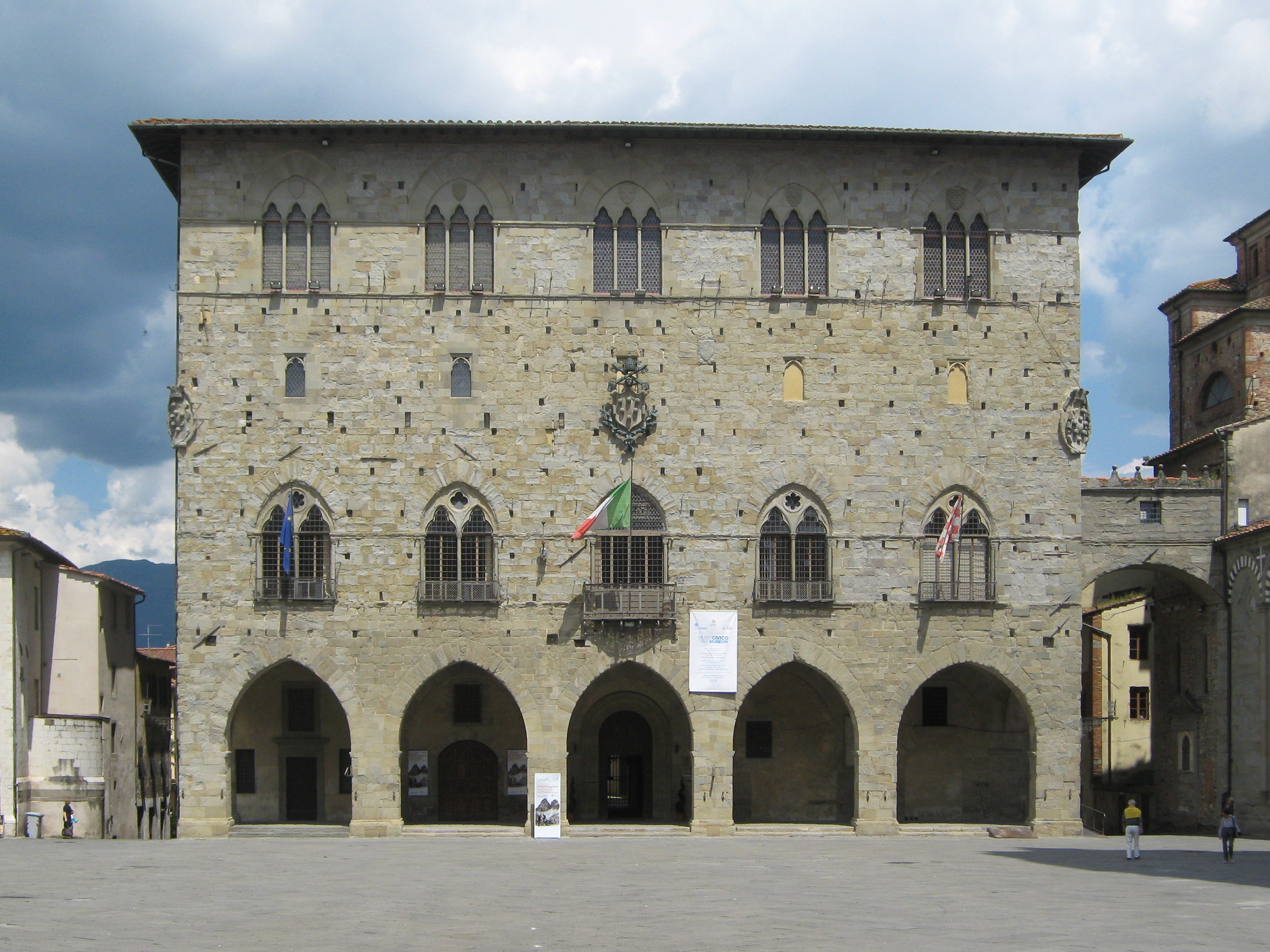
Palazzo degli Anziani, Pistoia

- Palazzo degli Anziani, Pistoia
- Palazzo Bracciolini, Pistoia
- Palazzo Fioravanti, Pistoia
- Palazzo Ganucci Cancellieri
- Palazzo Marchetti, Pistoia
- Palazzo Panciatichi
- Palazzo del Priorino, Pistoia
- Palazzo Puccini, Pistoia
- Palazzo Rospigliosi a Ripa del Sale
- Palazzo Rospigliosi a Via del Duca
- Palazzo Pretorio, Pistoia
- Palazzo Rossi, Pistoia
- Palazzo Sozzifanti

== Pontremoli ==
- Palazzo Dosi-Magnavacca, Pontremoli

== Pordenone ==
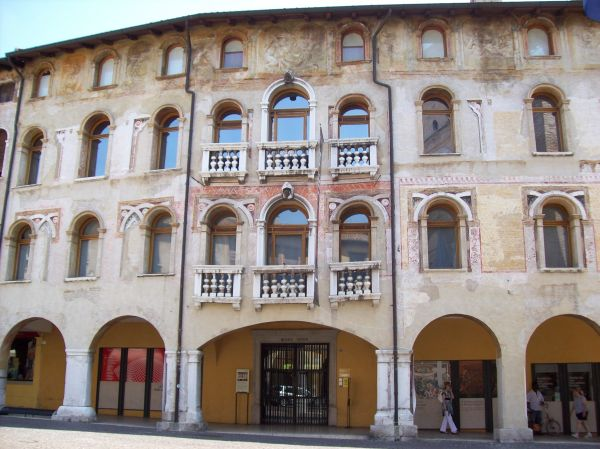
Palazzo Ricchieri, Pordenone

- Palazzo Ricchieri, Pordenone

== Porto Mantovano ==
- Villa La Favorita

== Potenza ==
- Palazzo Loffredo

== Prato ==
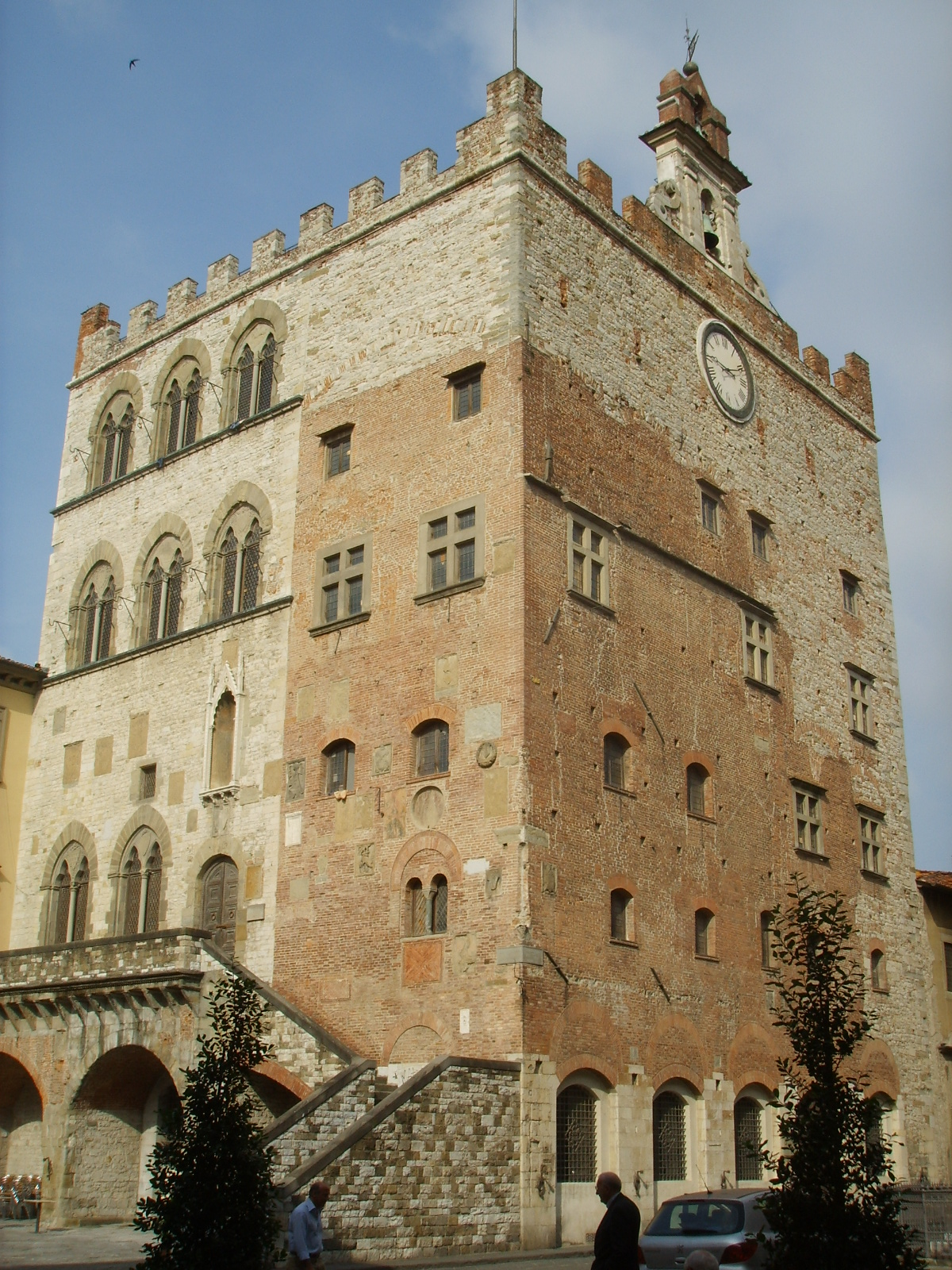
Palazzo Pretorio, Prato

- Palazzo degli Alberti
- Palazzo Datini
- Palazzo Pretorio, Prato

== Racconigi ==
- Castle of Racconigi

== Ragusa ==
- Palazzo Zacco

== Ravenna ==
- Palace of Theodoric

== Reggio Emilia ==
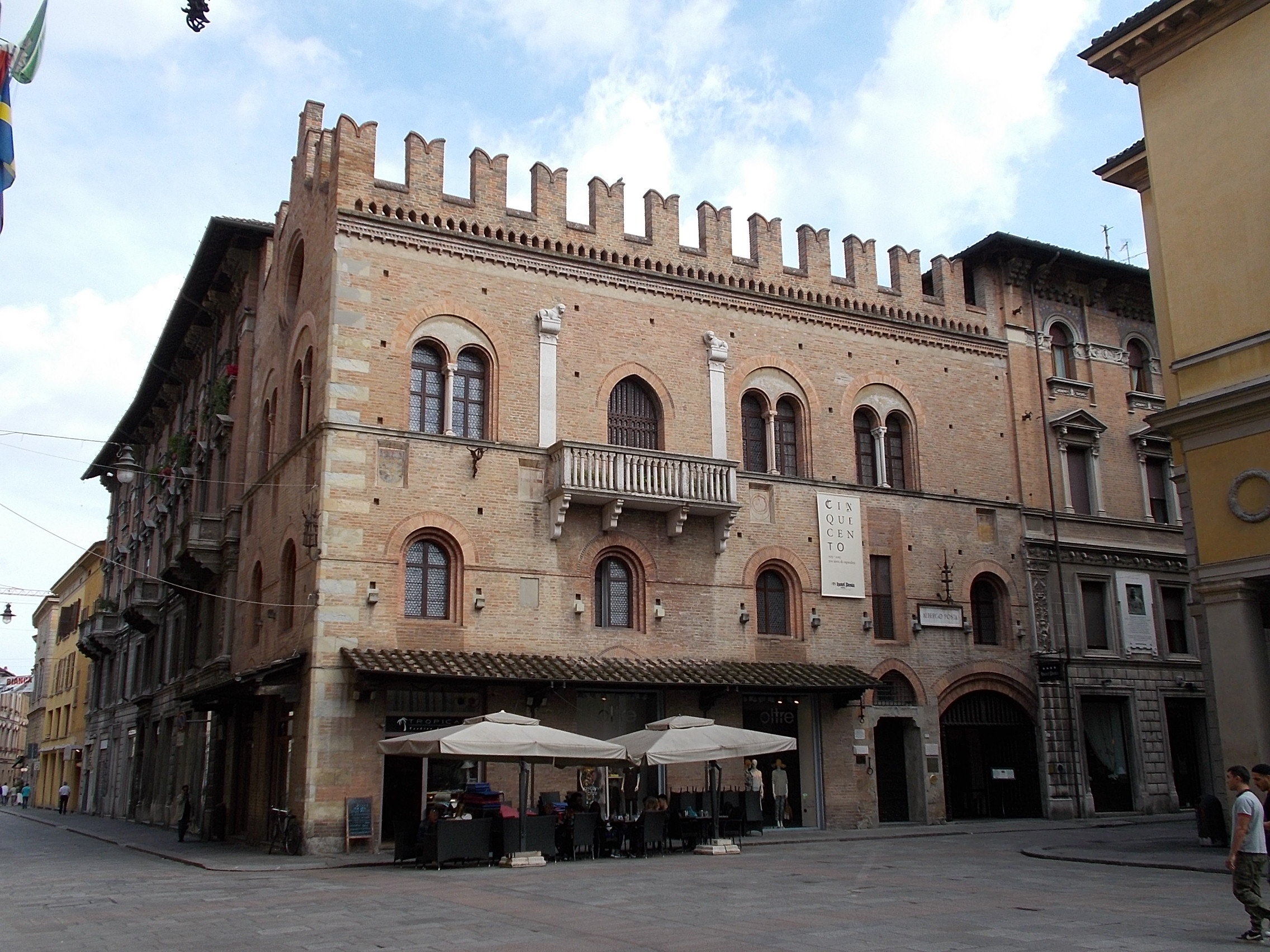
Palazzo del Capitano del Popolo, Reggio Emilia

- Palazzo Ancini
- Palazzo Busetti
- Palazzo del Capitano del Popolo, Reggio Emilia
- Palazzo Cassoli – Tirelli
- Palazzo Fontanelli Sacrati, Reggio Emilia
- Ducal Palace of Guastalla
- Palazzo Magnani, Reggio Emilia
- Palazzo Masdoni, Reggio Emilia
- Palazzo da Mosto, Reggio Emilia
- Palazzo Cassoli
- Palazzo Del Carbone
- Hospital Omozzoli Parisetti
- Palazzo Pratonieri, Reggio Emilia
- Palazzo dei Musei, Reggio Emilia
- Ducal Palace of Rivalta
- Palazzo San Giorgio, Reggio Emilia
- Palazzo Spalletti-Trivelli
- Palazzo Tirelli

== Rieti ==
- Palazzo Vicentini

== Rimini ==
- Palazzo Gambalunga

== Rome ==
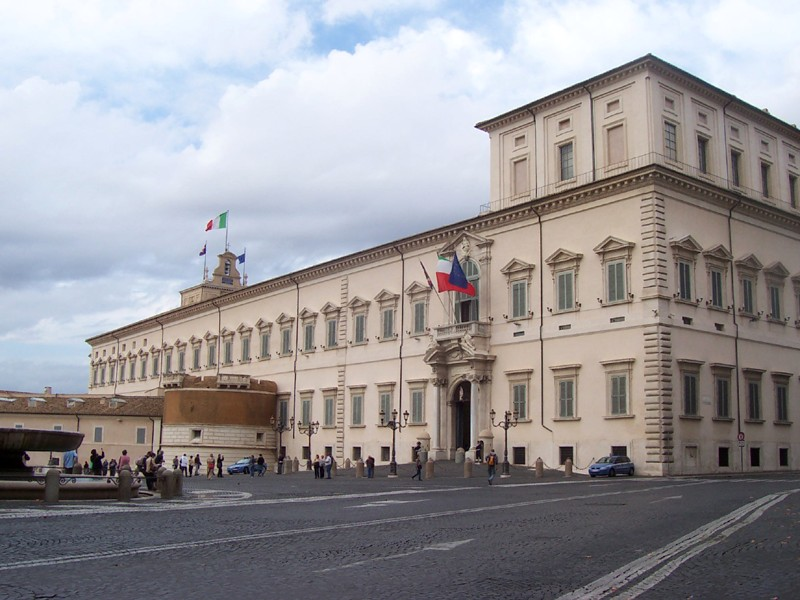
Palazzo del Quirinale, Rome

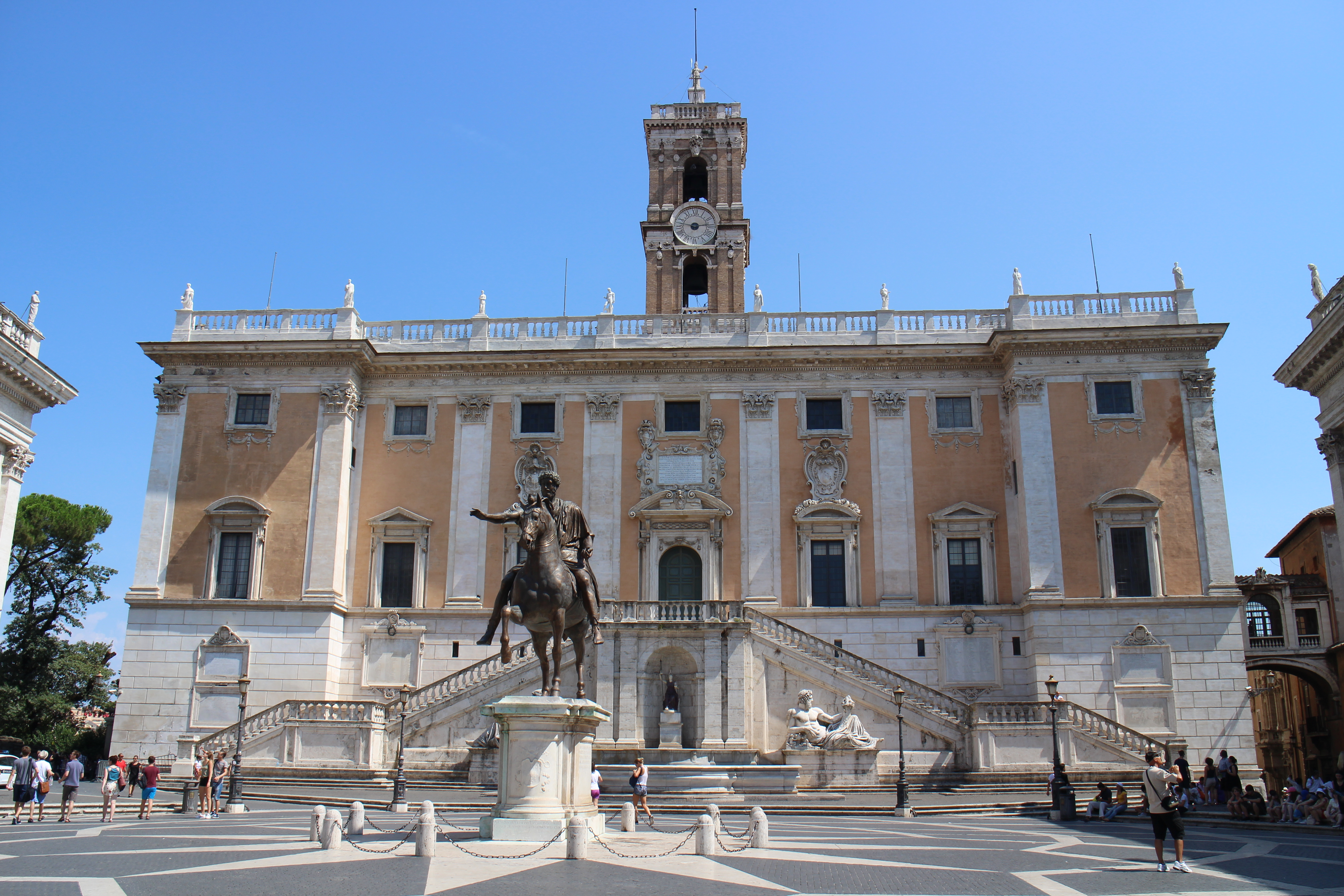
Palazzo Senatorio, seat of the municipality of Rome. It has been a town hall since AD 1144, making it the oldest town hall in the world.

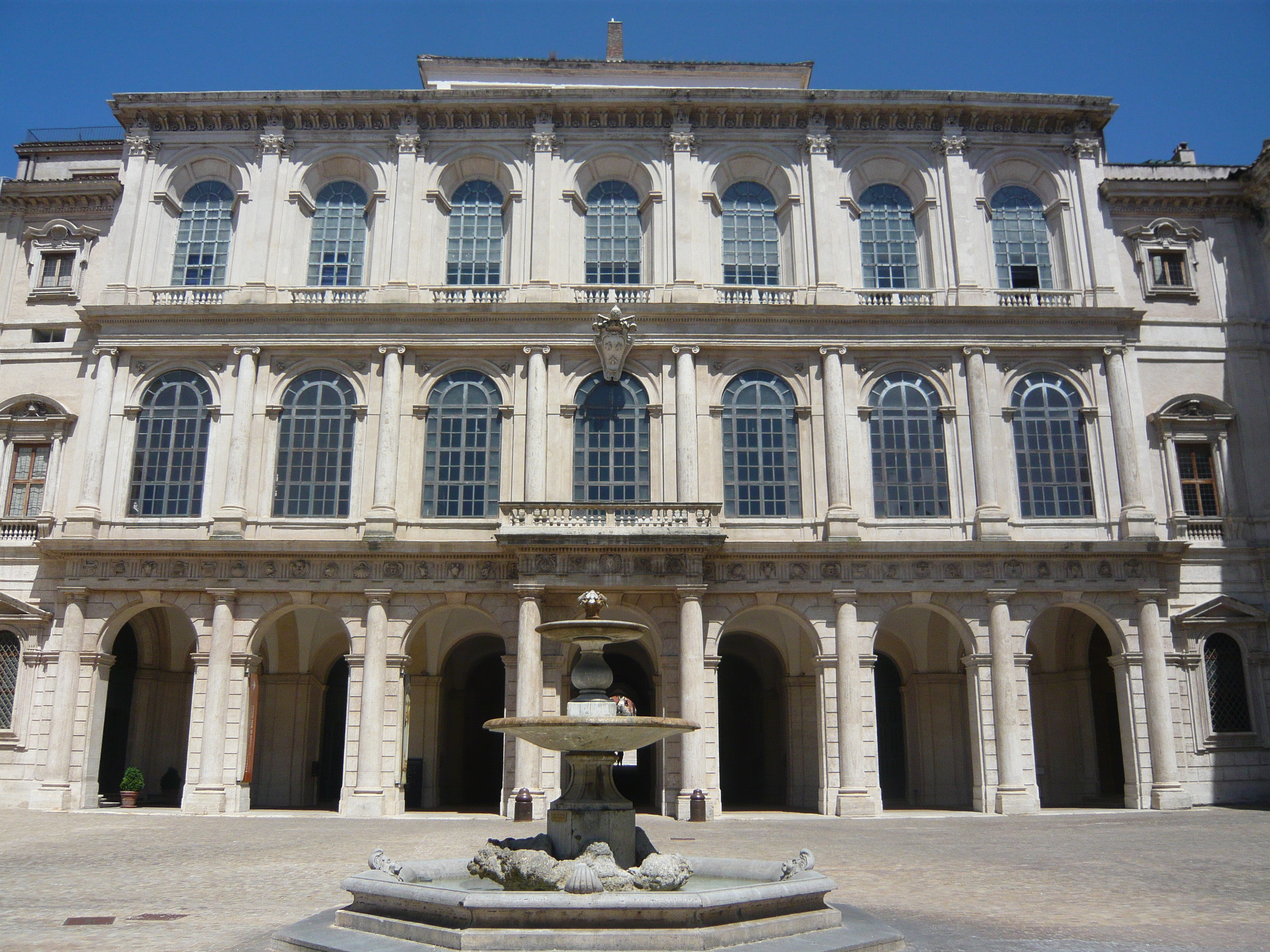
Palazzo Barberini, Rome

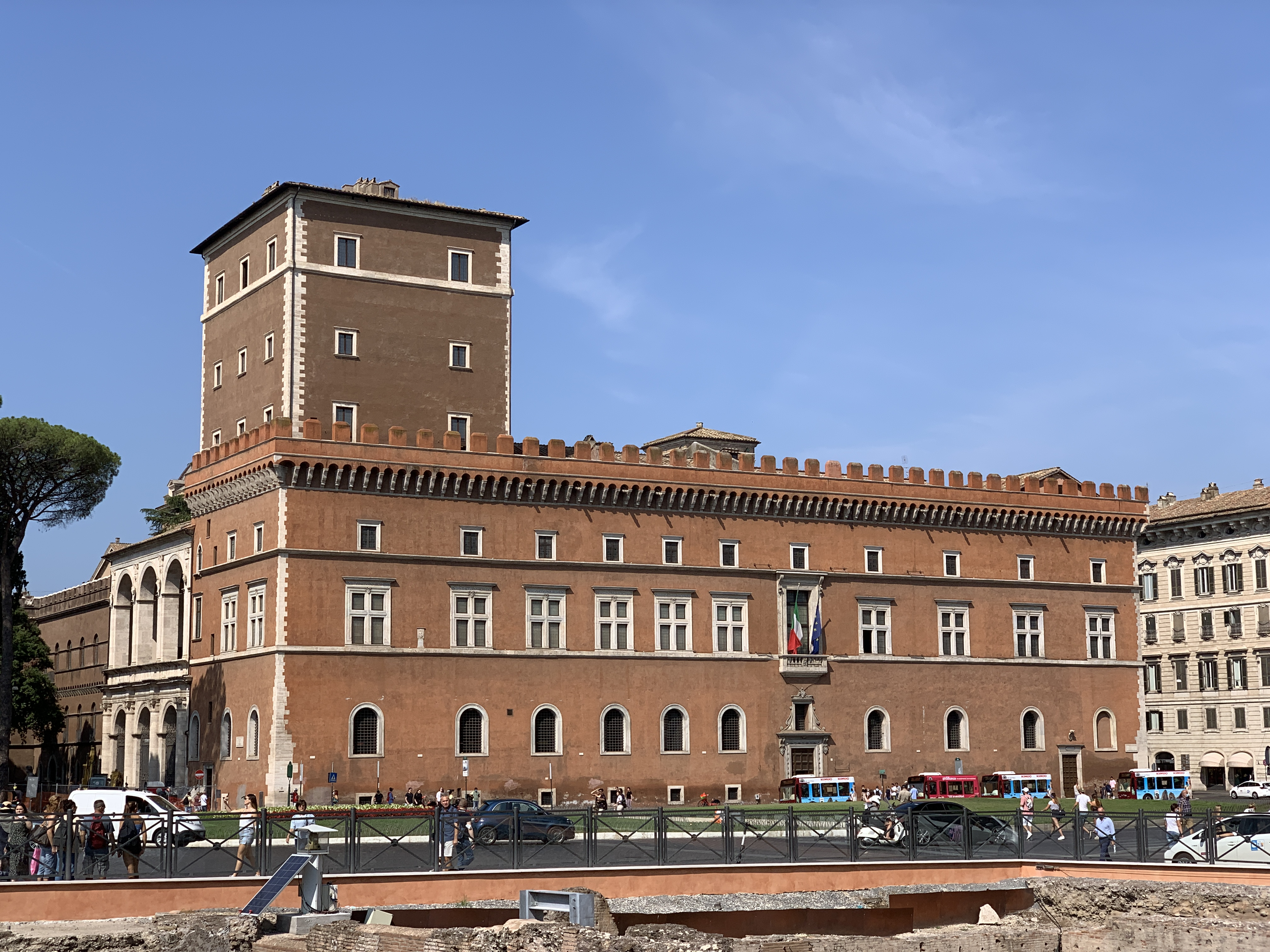
Palazzo di Venezia, Rome

- Palazzo Altavity
- Palazzo Altemps
- Palazzo Altieri
- Palazzo Baldassini
- Palazzo Barberini – Galleria Nazionale d'Arte Antica
- Palazzo Borghese
- Palazzo Brancaccio
- Palazzo Braschi – Last palace committed in Rome by the Pope for their families
- Palazzo della Cancelleria – Former papal palace
- Palazzo Carpegna
- Palazzo Chigi – Seat of the Italian Cabinet; residence of the prime minister of Italy
- Palazzo della Civiltà Italiana – Also known as 'Square Colosseum', in the EUR district
- Palazzo Colonna
- Palazzo dei Congressi
- Palazzo dei Conservatori – Gallery founded in 1471, located in Campidoglio
- Palazzo della Consulta
- Palazzo Corsini – Office of the Accademia dei Lincei
- Palazzo Donatelli-Ricci
- Palazzo Doria Pamphilj
- Palazzo delle Esposizioni – Rome's largest exhibition space
- Palazzo Farnese – Currently French Embassy in Italy
- Palazzo della Farnesina
- Palazzo Giustiniani
- Palazzo di Giustizia – Supreme Court of Italy
- Palazzo Grazioli
- Palazzo Lancellotti ai Coronari
- Palazzo Laterano – Seat of the Diocese of Rome
- Palazzo Madama – Seat of the Italian Senate
- Palazzo Malta
- Palazzo Mancini
- Palazzo Margherita
- Palazzo Massimi
- Palazzo Massimo alle Colonne
- Palazzo Massimo alle Terme – Main branch of National Museum of Rome
- Palazzo Mattei
- Palazzo Montecitorio – Italian Parliament
- Palazzo Muti
- Palazzo Nuovo – Comprising the Capitoline Museums with Palazzo dei Conservatori
- Palazzo Odescalchi
- Palazzo Muti Papazzurri
- Palazzo Pallavicini-Rospigliosi
- Palazzo Pamphilj
- Palazzo Pio
- Palazzo Poli
- Palazzo di Propaganda Fide
- Palazzo del Quirinale – Residence from the Pope to the President
- Palazzo Rondinini
- Palazzo Ruspoli
- Palazzo Santacroce
- Palazzo della Sapienza – Old seat of the University of Rome
- Palazzo Sciarra
- Palazzo delle Scienze
- Palazzo Senatorio – City Hall of Rome
- Palazzo Spada
- Palazzo dello Sport
- Palazzo Taverna – built by Cardinal Giordano Orsini
- Palazzo del Vaticano – Official residence of the Pope
- Palazzo Valentini
- Palazzo di Venezia – Former the Embassy of the Republic of Venice
- Palazzo Zuccari

== Rosciano ==
- Palazzo De Felice

== Rovigo ==
- Palazzo Roverella, Rovigo

== Sabbioneta ==
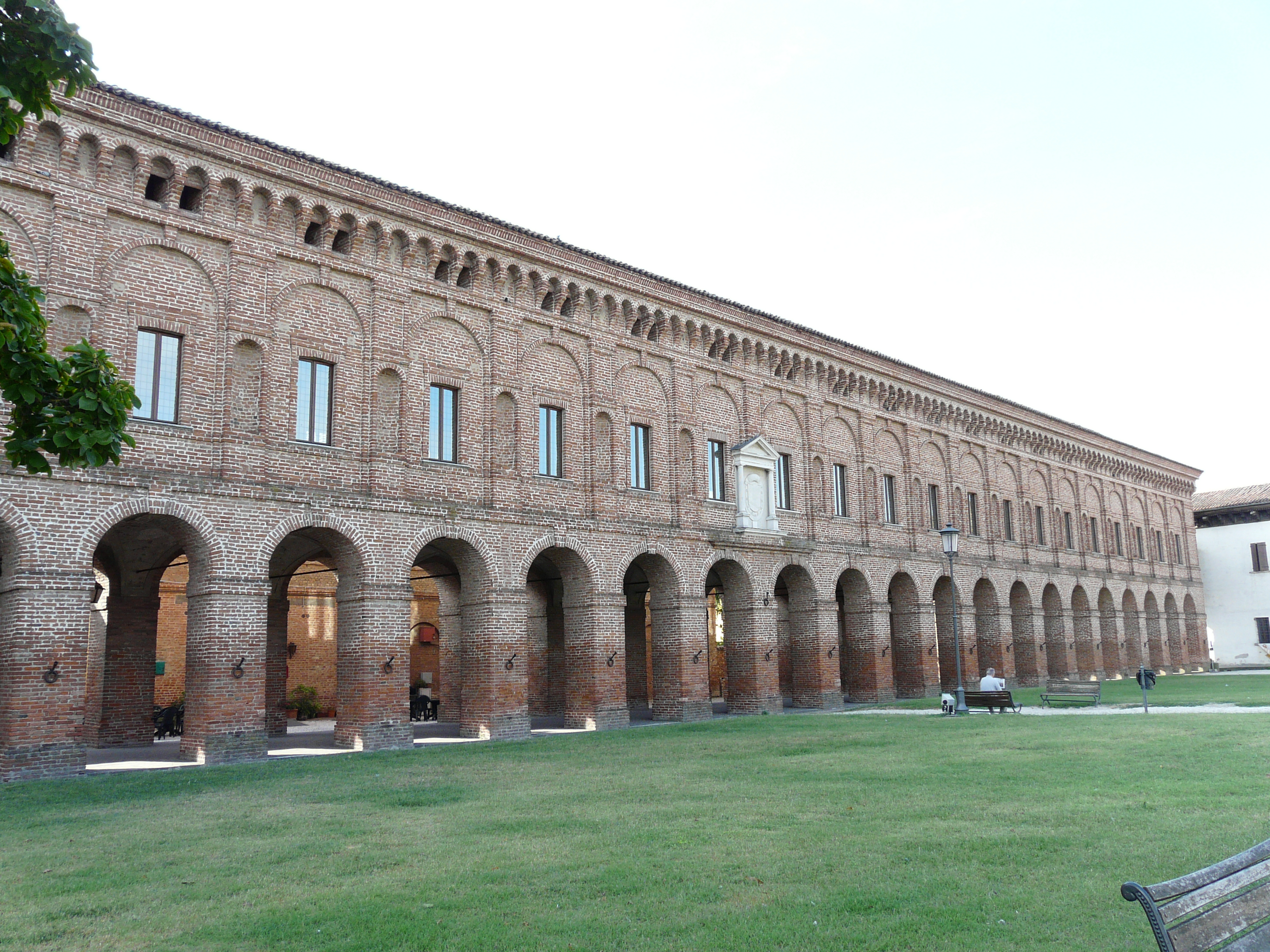
Galleria degli Antichi and Palazzo del Giardino, Sabbioneta

- Galleria degli Antichi and Palazzo del Giardino

== Salerno ==
- Palazzo Pinto

== Saluzzo ==
- Casa Cavassa

== San Gimignano ==
- Palazzo Comunale, San Gimignano

== San Tammaro ==
- Royal Palace of Carditello

== Sarzana ==
- Palazzo del Capitano

== Sassari ==
- Palazzo Giordano Apostoli
- Palazzo della Provincia
- Palazzo Ducale
- Palazzo d'Usini

== Sassuolo ==
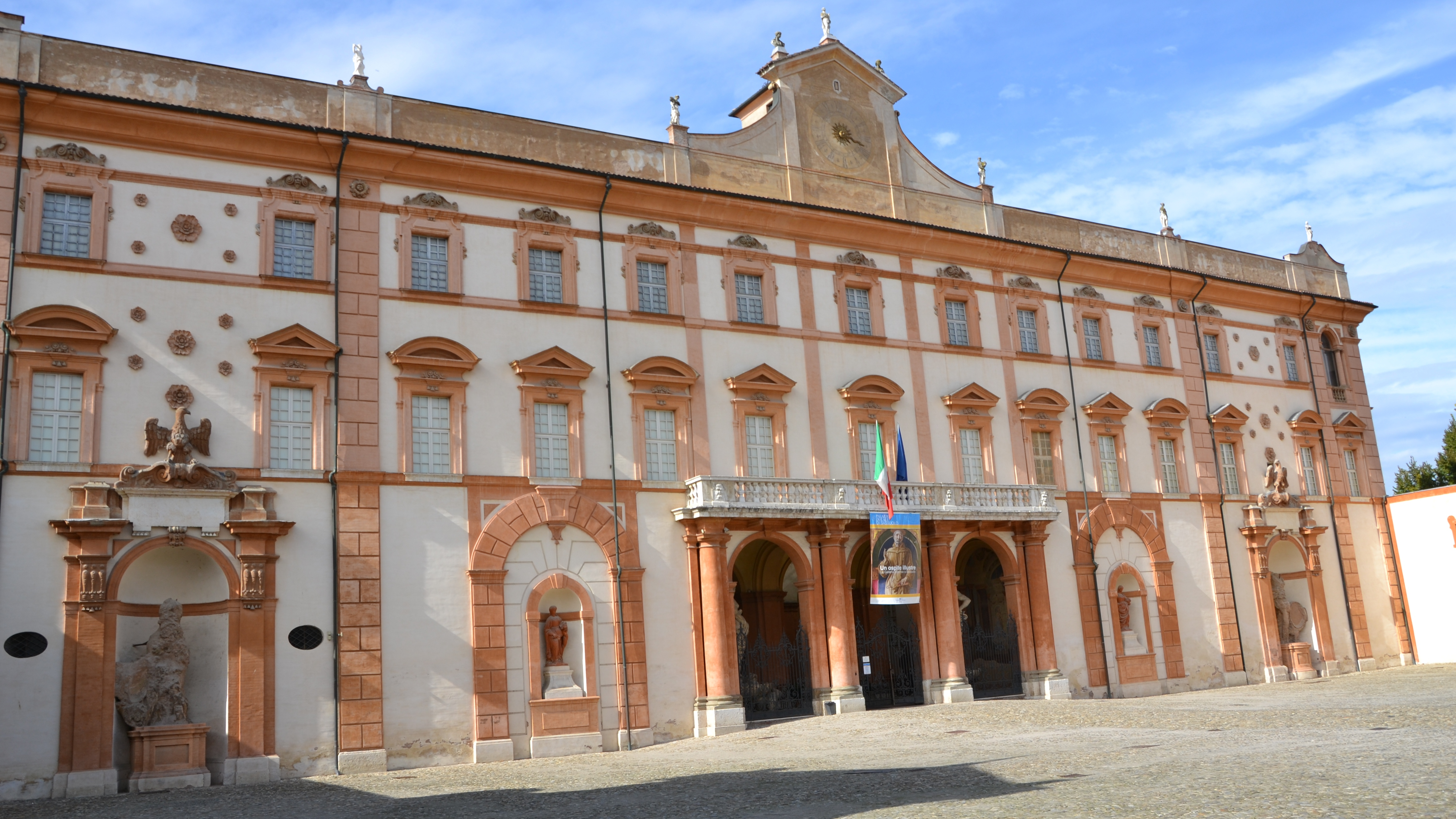
Ducal Palace of Sassuolo

- Ducal Palace of Sassuolo

== Siena ==
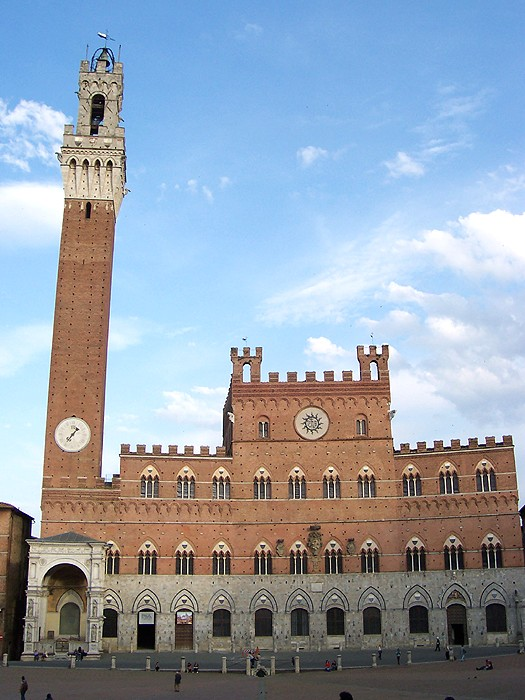
Palazzo Pubblico, Siena

- Episcopal Palace, Siena
- Palazzo Bandini-Piccolomini
- Palazzo Bichi Ruspoli
- Palazzo Bindi Sergardi
- Palazzo del Capitano del Popolo, Siena
- Castellare degli Ugurgieri
- Palazzo Celsi Pollini
- Palazzo Chigi alla Postierla
- Palazzo Chigi-Saracini
- Palazzo Fani Mignanelli
- Palazzo Fineschi Segardi
- Palazzo Francesconi-Mocenni
- Palazzo San Galgano
- Palazzo Gori Pannilini
- Palazzo Incontri
- Palazzo Marsili-Libelli
- Palazzo Marsili
- Palazzo Bichi Buonsignori
- Palazzo del Magnifico
- Palazzo Palmieri
- Palazzo Piccolomini-Clementini
- Palazzo Piccolomini, Siena
- Palazzo Pubblico
- Palazzo Salimbeni
- Palazzo Sansedoni
- Palazzo Sergardi, Siena
- Palazzo Spannocchi
- Palazzo Tantucci
- Palazzo Tolomei
- Palazzo Turchi
- Palazzo Venturi Gallerani

== Somma Vesuviana ==
- Palazzo de Felice, Somma Vesuviana

== Stupinigi ==
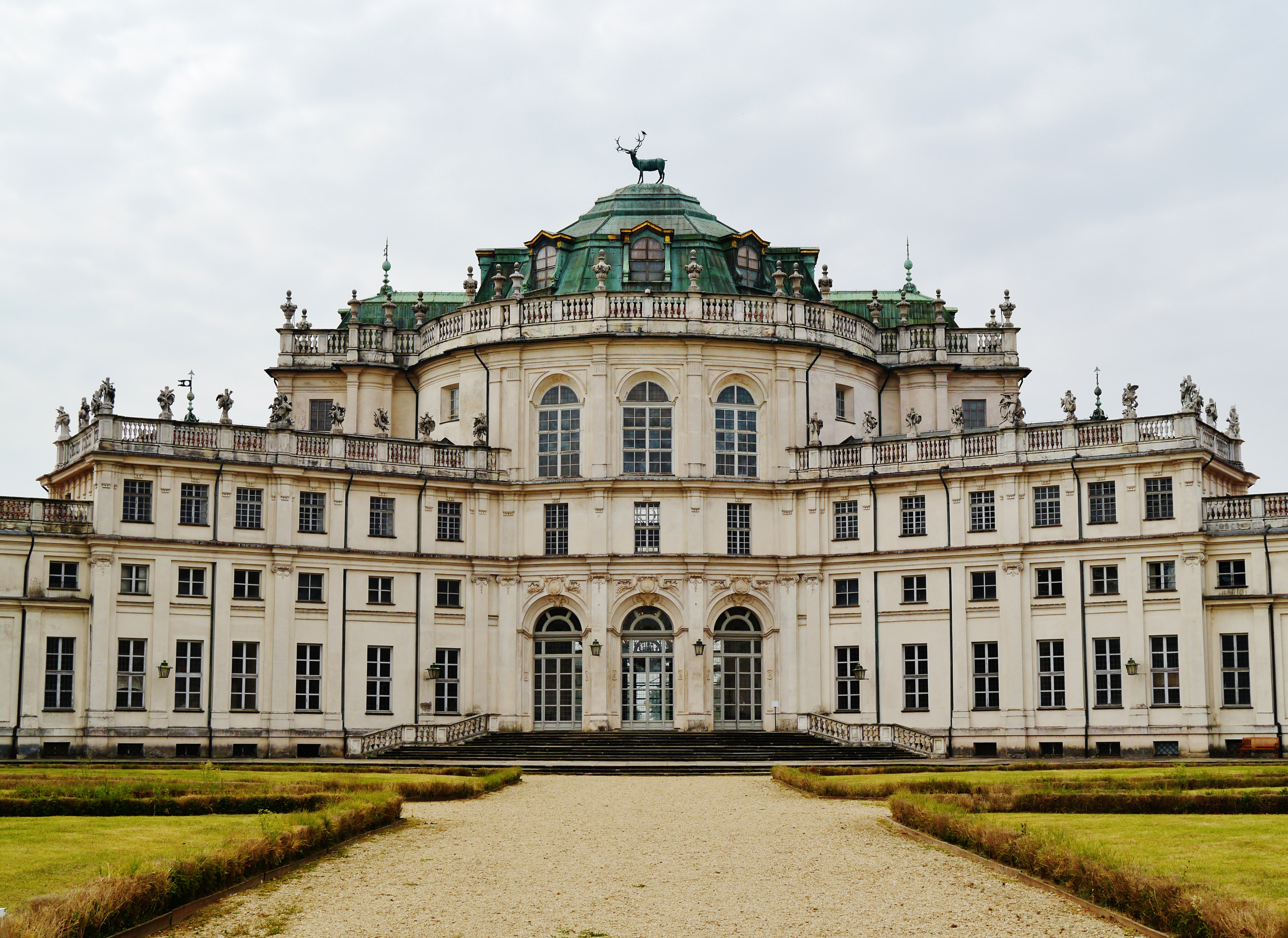
Palazzina di caccia of Stupinigi

- Palazzina di caccia of Stupinigi

== Syracuse ==
- Palazzo Bellemo
- Palazzo Beneventano del Bosco
- Palazzo Migliaccio
- Palazzo Vermexio
- Palazzo Lantieri, Siracusa
- Palazzo Montalto

== Taormina ==
- Palazzo Corvaia
- Palazzo San Stefano

== Teglio ==
- Palazzo Besta

== Terni ==
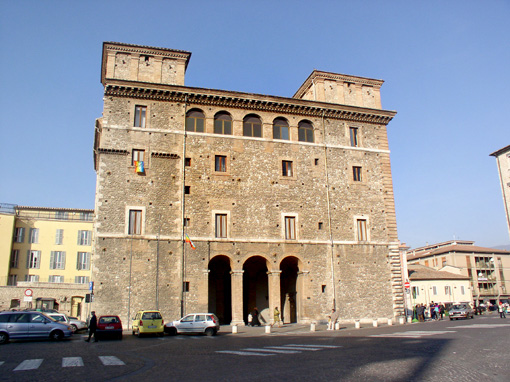
Palazzo Spada, Terni

- Palazzo Spada (Terni)

== Thiene ==
- Palazzo Porto Colleoni Thiene

== Tirano ==
- Palazzo Salis

== Todi ==
- Palazzo del Capitano
- Palazzo del Popolo
- Palazzo dei Priori (Todi)

== Trento ==
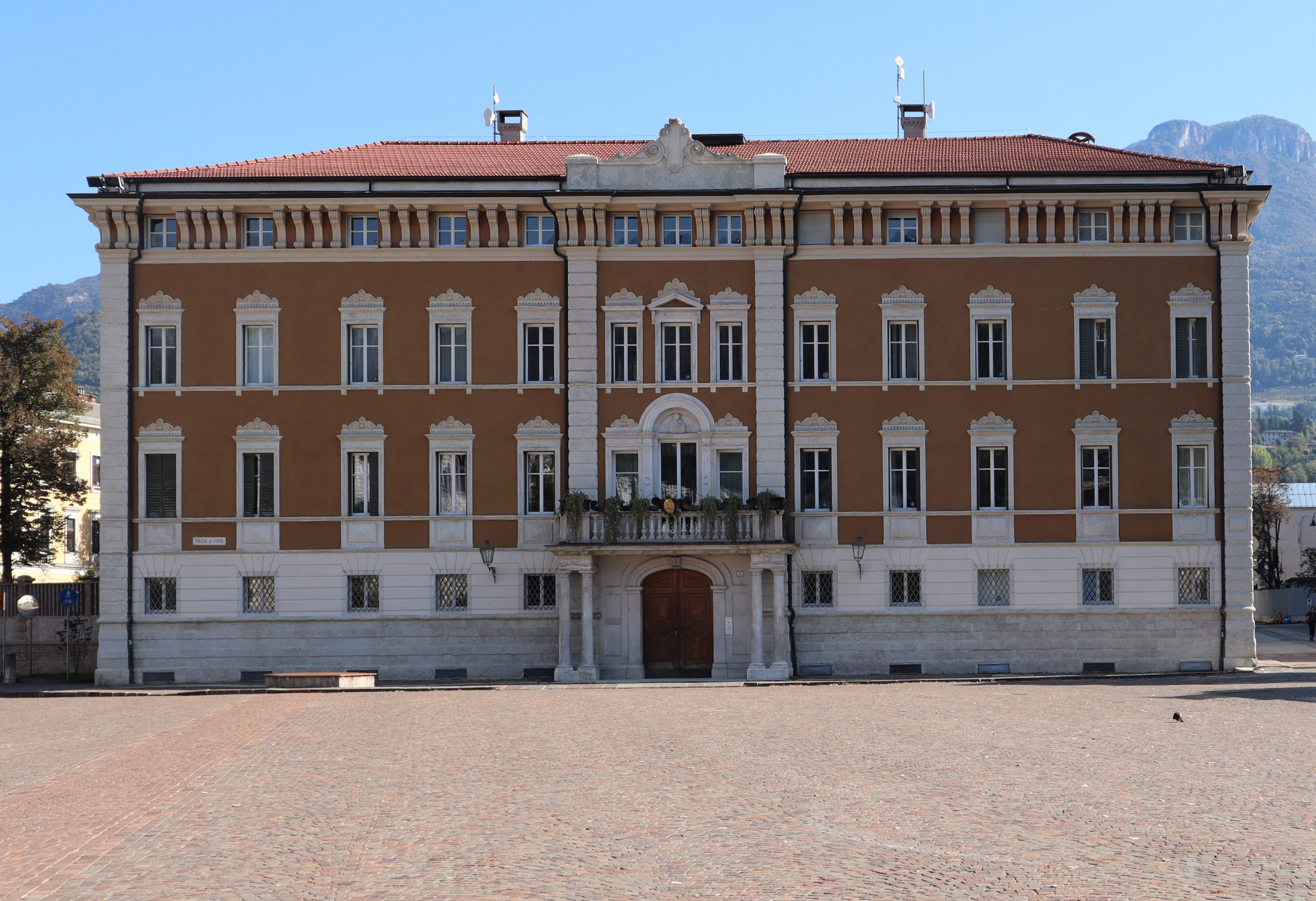
Palazzo Arcivescovile, Trento

- Palazzo Arcivescovile
- Palazzo delle Albere
- Palazzo Communale
- Palazzo Geremia
- Palazzo Pretorio
- Palazzo Salvadori
- Buonconsiglio Castle

== Treviso ==
- Palazzo dei Trecento

== Turin ==
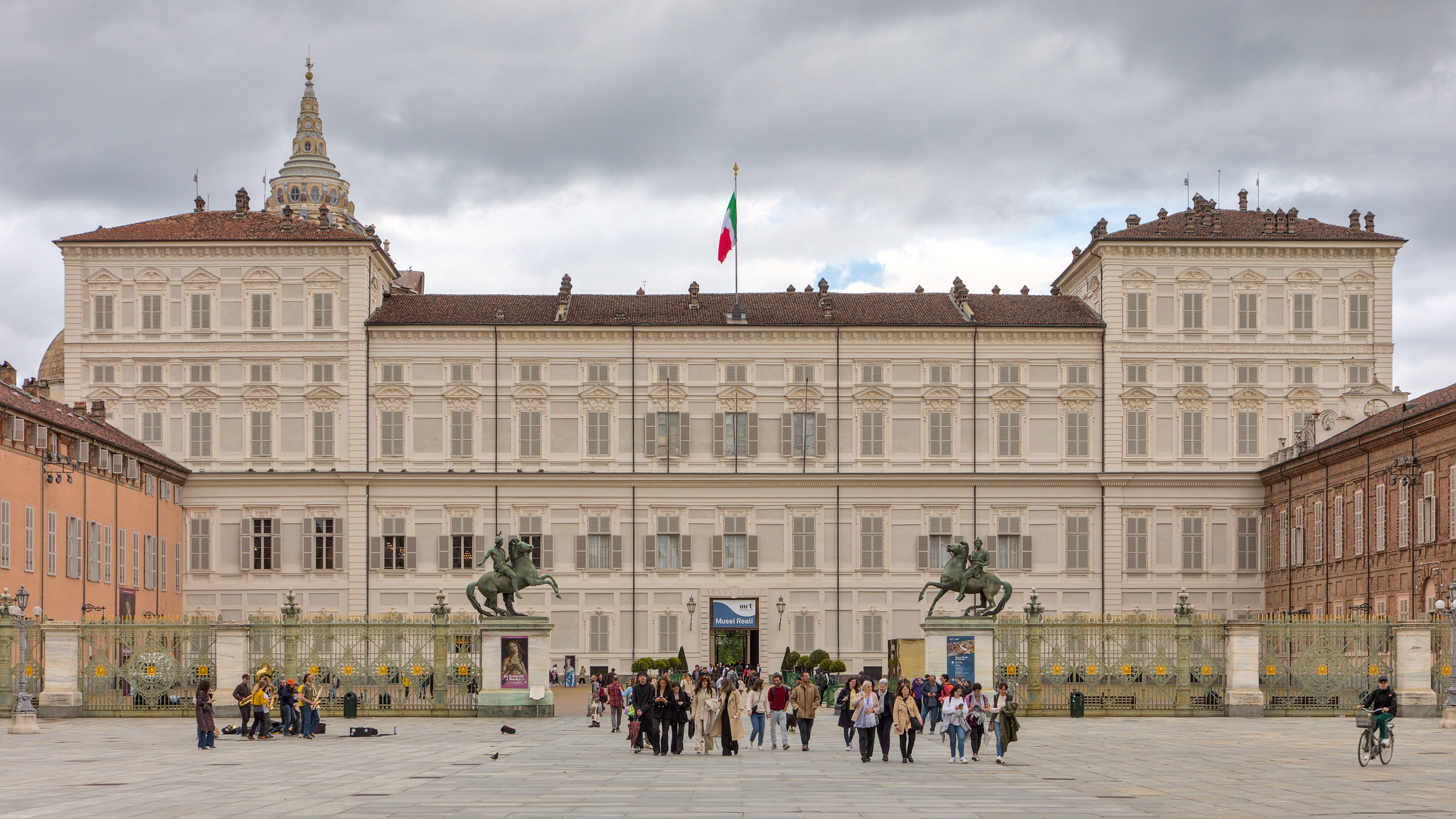
Royal Palace of Turin

- Palazzo Carignano
- Castello del Valentino
- Palazzo Chiablese
- Fetta di Polenta
- Palazzo Madama, Turin
- Palazzo Gualino
- Royal Palace of Turin
- Villa della Regina

== Udine ==
- Palazzo dell'Arcivescovado
- Palazzo Antonini, Udine
- Udine Castle

== Ugento ==
- Palazzo Rovito

== Urbino ==
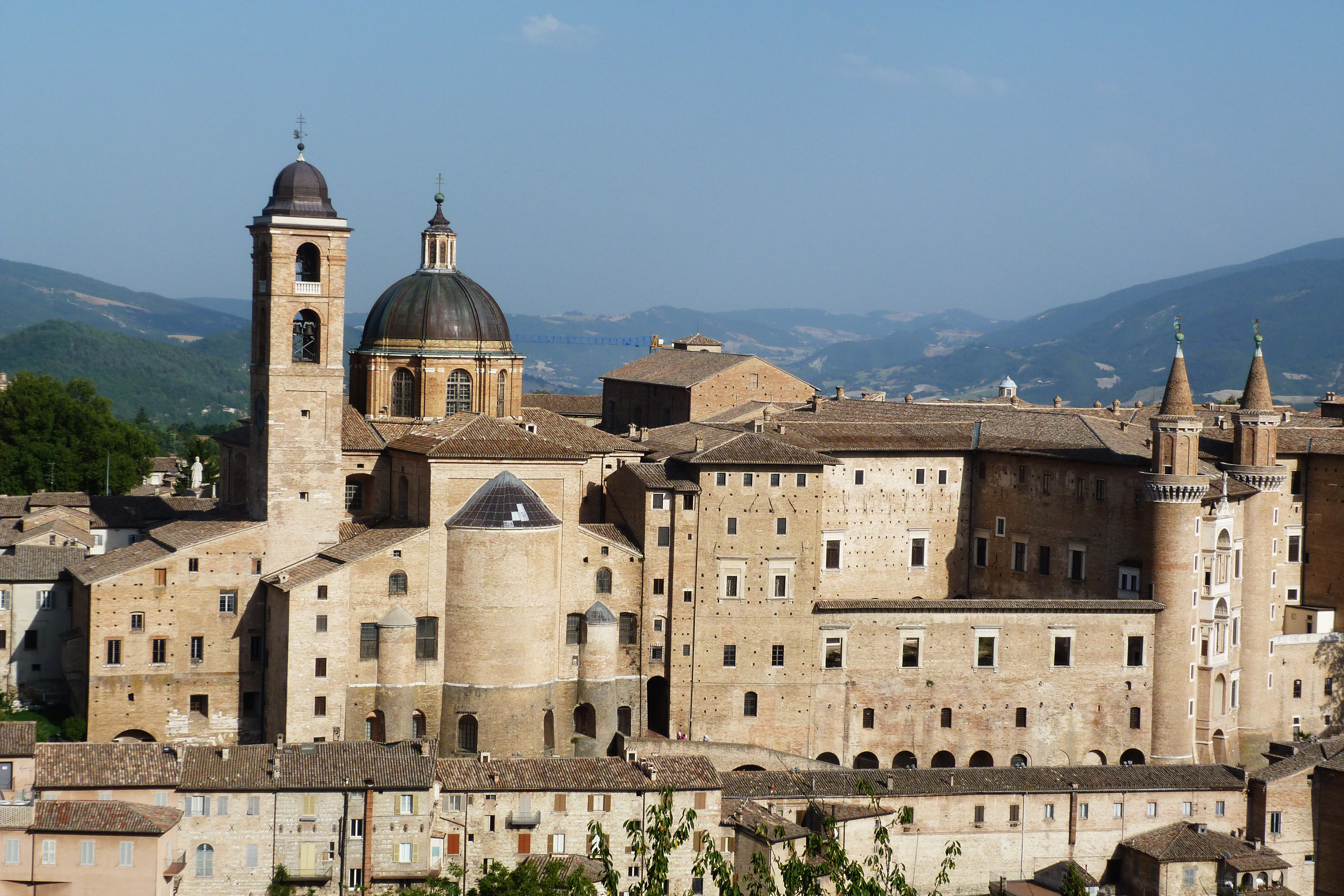
Ducal Palace, Urbino

- Ducal Palace, Urbino

== Varese ==
- Palazzo Estense

== Venaria Reale ==
- Palace of Venaria

== Venice ==
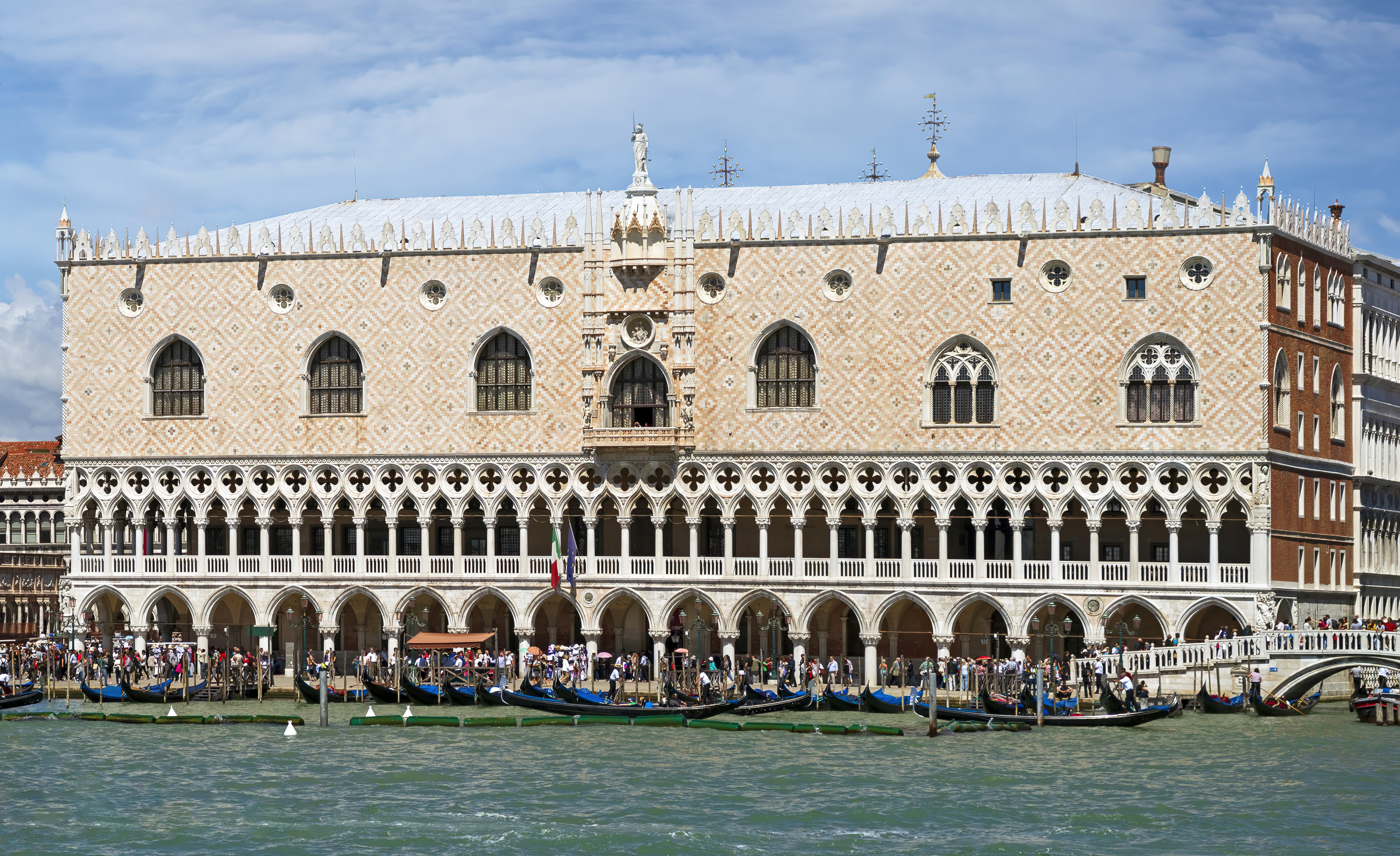
Doge's Palace, Venice

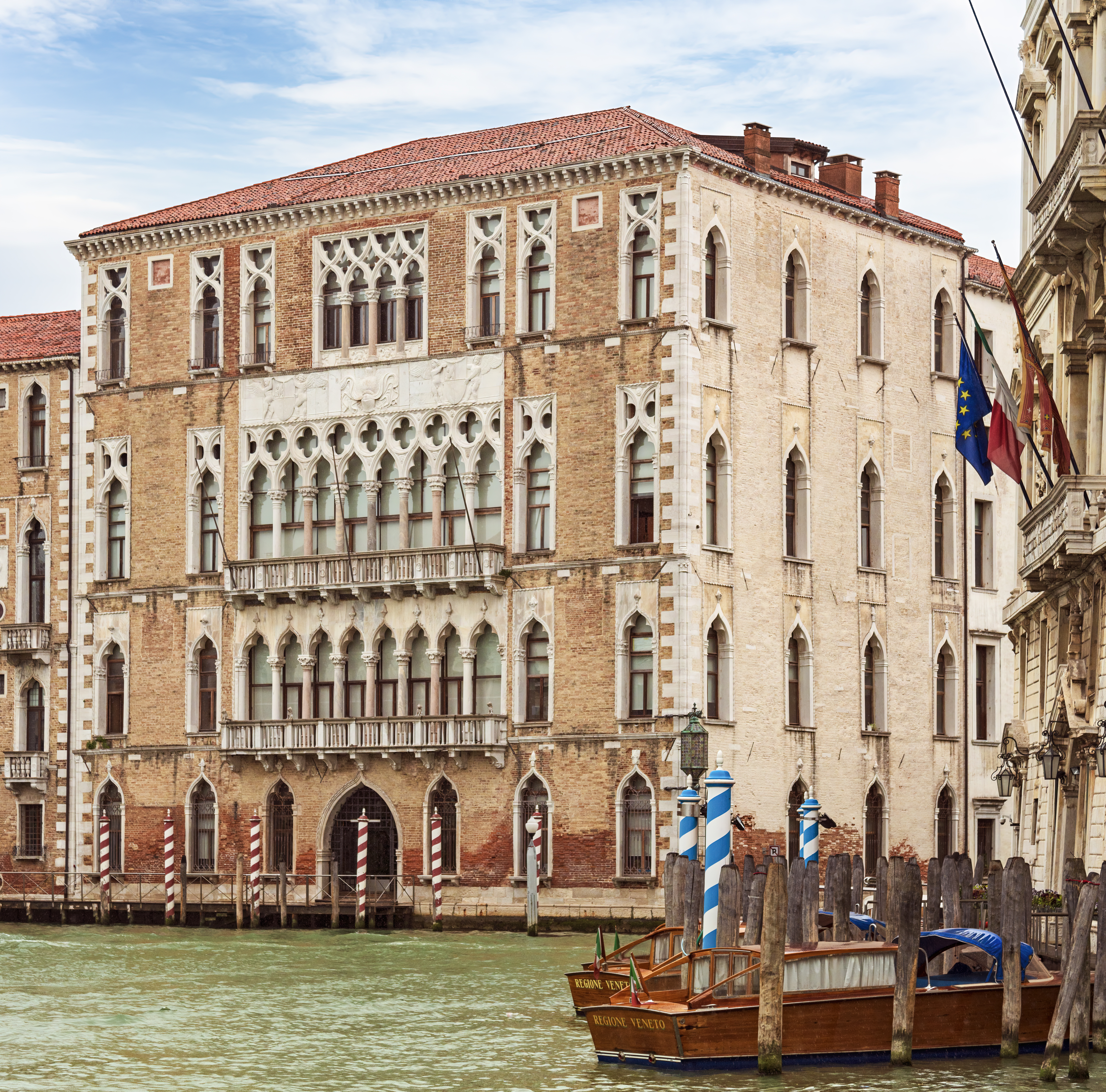
Palazzo Foscari, Venice

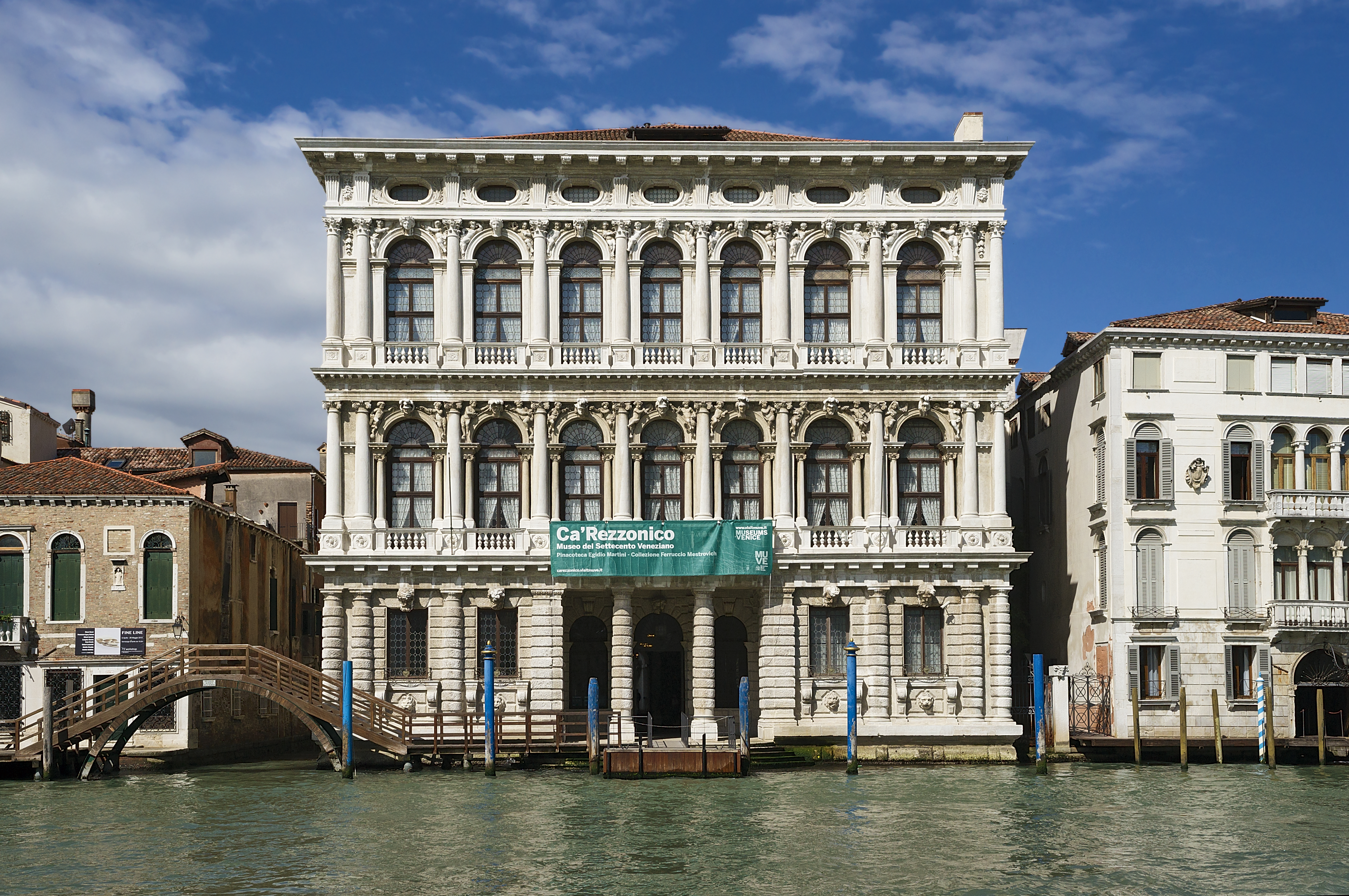
Ca' Rezzonico, Venice

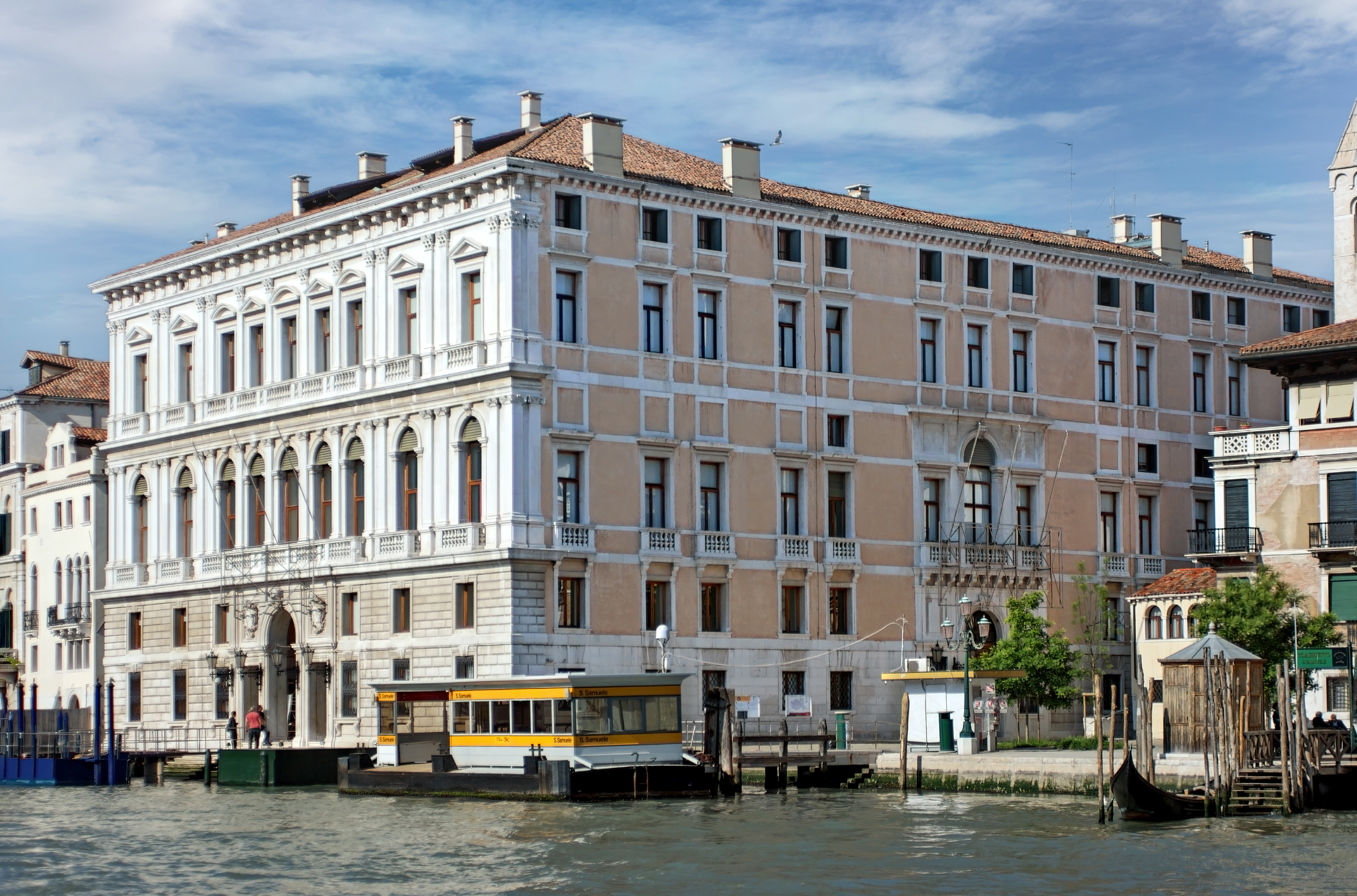
Palazzo Grassi, Venice

- Palazzo Adoldo
- Palazzo Ariani
- Palazzo Barbarigo
- Palazzo Barbarigo Nani Mocenigo
- Palazzi Barbaro
- Palazzo Barbaro Wolkoff
- Palazzo Bernardo Nani
- Palazzo Bonfadini Vivante
- Palazzo Bollani Erizzo
- Palazzo D'Anna Viaro Martinengo Volpi di Misurata
- Palazzo Calbo Crotta
- Palazzo Cavalli
- Palazzo Cavalli-Franchetti
- Palazzo Contarini del Bovolo
- Palazzo Contarini Dal Zaffo
- Palazzo Contarini Fasan
- Palazzo Contarini Pisani
- Palazzo Contarini Flangini
- Palazzo Cornaro
- Palazzo Corner della Ca' Grande
- Palazzo Corner Spinelli
- Palazzo Corner Valmarana
- Palazzo Correr Contarini Zorzi
- Palazzo Corner Contarini dei Cavalli
- Palazzo Dandolo
- Palazzo Dario
- Doge's Palace
- Palazzo Erizzo Nani Mocenigo
- Palazzo Farsetti
- Palazzo Ferro Fini
- Palazzo Foscari
- Palazzo Giovanelli
- Palazzo Gradenigo
- Palazzo Grassi
- Palazzo Grimani di San Luca
- Palazzo Grimani di Santa Maria Formosa
- Palazzo Labia
- Palazzo Malipiero
- Palazzo Marcello Toderini
- Palazzo Mastelli del Cammello
- Palazzo Michiel del Brusà
- Palazzo Memmo Martinengo Mandelli
- Palazzo Mocenigo Gambara
- Palazzo Molina
- Palazzo Moro Lin (San Marco)
- Palazzo Moro Lin (San Polo)
- Palazzo Nani
- Palazzo Orio Semitecolo Benzon
- Palazzo Pisani a San Stefano
- Palazzo Pisani Gritti
- Palazzo Pisani Moretta
- Palazzo Querini Benzon
- Palazzo Regio
- Palazzo Savorgnan
- Palazzo Smith Mangilli Valmarana
- Palazzo Soranzo Cappello
- Palazzo Soranzo Van Axel
- Palazzo Surian Bellotto
- Palazzo Testa
- Palazzo Tiepolo
- Palazzo Pisani Moretta
- Palazzo Zorzi Bon

In Venice some palazzi are conventionally called Ca' ("casa"):

- Ca' da Mosto
- Ca' d'Oro
- Ca' Farsetti
- Ca' Loredan
- Ca' Pesaro
- Ca' Rezzonico
- Ca' Vendramin Calergi
- Ca' Zen

== Verona ==
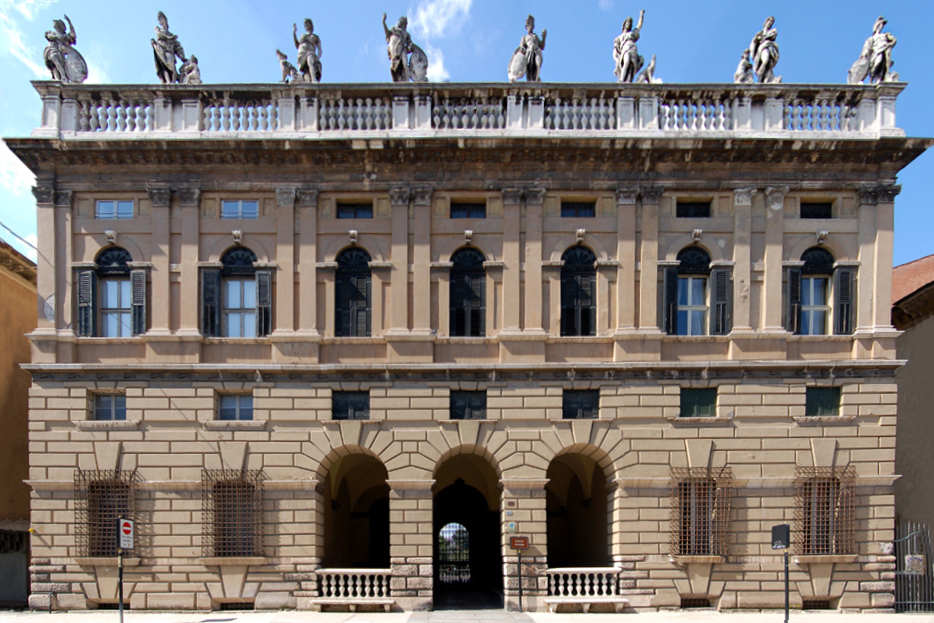
Palazzo Canossa, Verona

- Palazzo Canossa, Verona
- Carli Palace of Verona
- Palazzo Dalla Torre
- Palazzo Giusti
- Palazzo Maffei, Verona
- Palazzo Miniscalchi
- Palazzo Barbieri
- Palazzo Ridolfi-Dalisca, Verona

== Viareggio ==
- Tenuta Reale (Viareggio)

== Vicenza ==
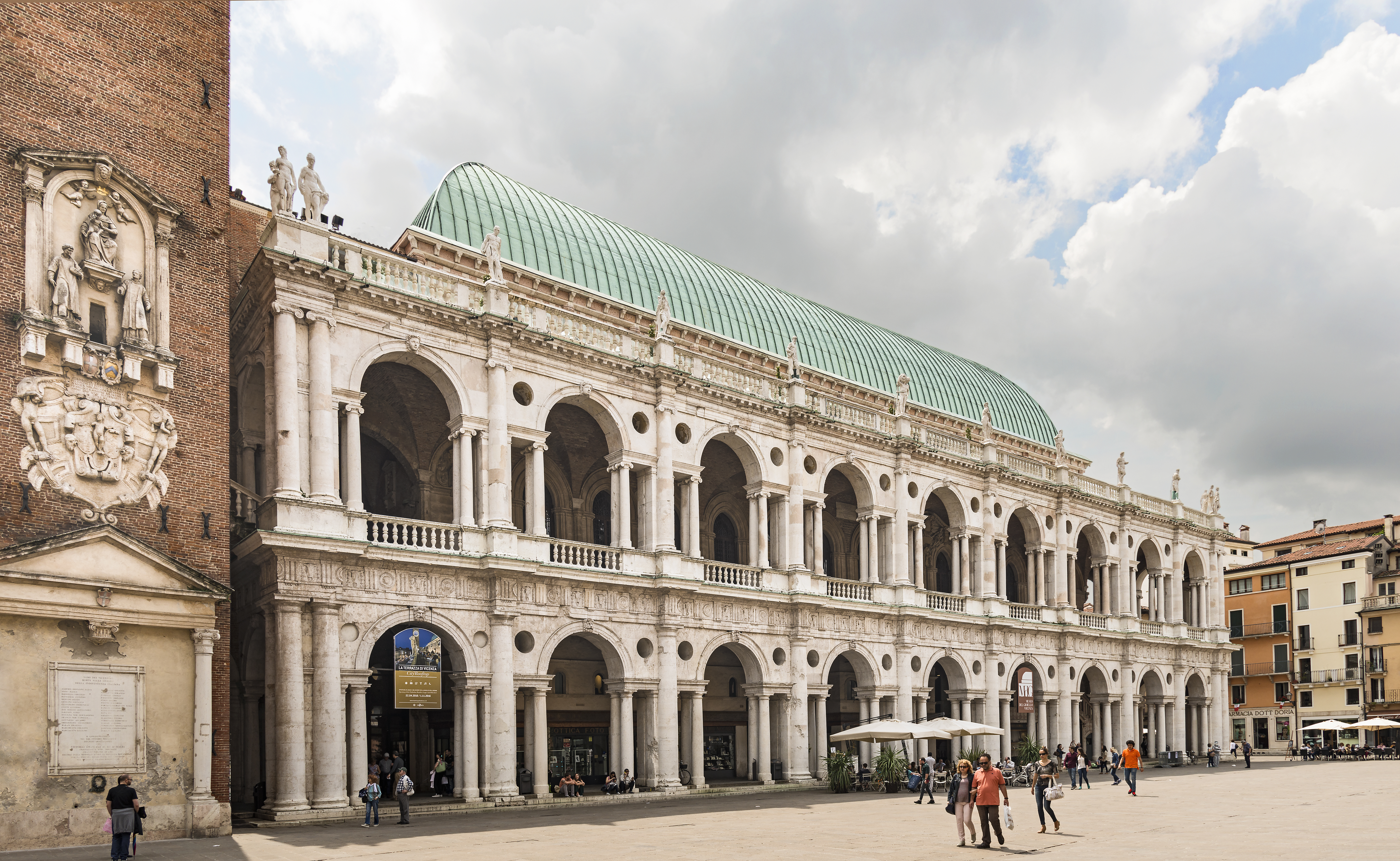
Basilica Palladiana, Vicenza

- Palazzo Barbaran da Porto
- Basilica Palladiana
- Biblioteca Civica Bertoliana
- Palazzo del Capitaniato
- Casa Cogollo
- Palazzo Chiericati
- Palazzo Civena
- Palazzo Leoni Montanari, Vicenza
- Palazzo Pojana, Vicenza
- Palazzo Porto, Vicenza
- Palazzo Porto in Piazza Castello
- Palazzo Schio
- Palazzo Thiene
- Palazzo Thiene Bonin Longare
- Palazzo Valmarana

== Viterbo ==
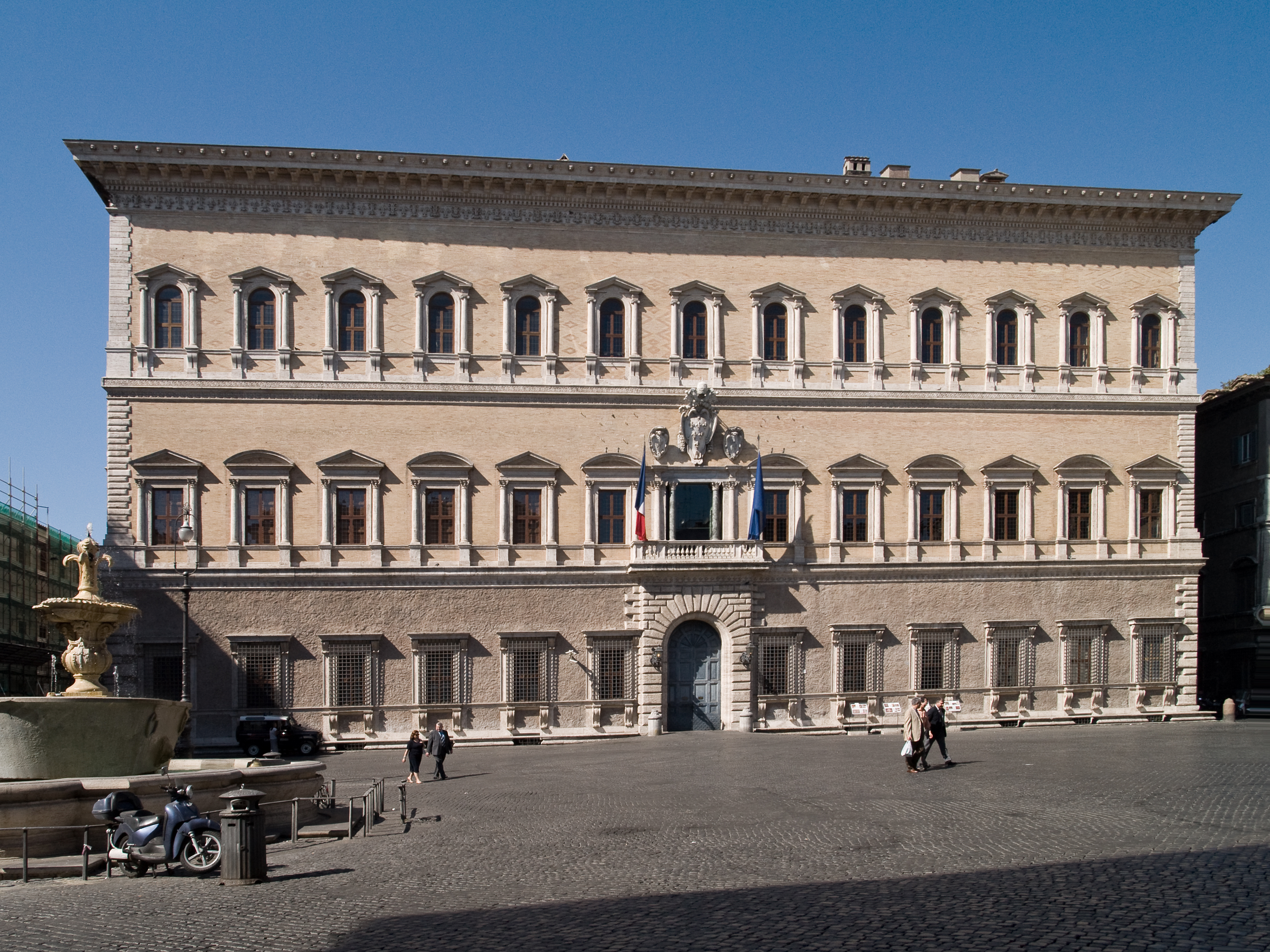
Palazzo Farnese, Viterbo

- Palazzo Farnese
- Palazzo degli Alessandri, Viterbo
- Palace of the Popes in Viterbo – Former papal seat from 1257 to 1281

== Volterra ==
- Palazzo dei Priori

== See also ==
- Ducal Palace (disambiguation)
