= Palazzo Spinola =

Palazzo Spinola or Spinola Palace may refer to:

Italy

- Palazzo Agostino Spinola
- Palazzo Angelo Giovanni Spinola
- Palazzo Cristoforo Spinola
- Palazzo Doria Spinola, Palazzo dei Rolli in the historical center of Genoa, included in the World Heritage Site Genoa: Le Strade Nuove and the system of the Palazzi dei Rolli
- Palazzo Giacomo Spinola
- Palazzo Doria (Genoa), formerly Palazzo Gio Battista Spinola, Palazzo dei Rolli in the historical center of Genoa, included in the World Heritage Site Genoa: Le Strade Nuove and the system of the Palazzi dei Rolli
- Palazzo Giorgio Spinola
- Palazzo Jacopo Spinola
- Palazzo Lercari-Spinola
- Palazzo Luciano Spinola di Luccoli
- Palazzo Nicolò Spinola
- Palazzo Nicolò Spinola di Luccoli
- Palazzo Spinola Gambaro
- Palazzo Pietro Spinola di San Luca
- Palazzo Spinola (Campo Ligure)
- Palazzo Spinola (Isola del Cantone)
- Palazzo Spinola (Milan)
- Palazzo Spinola (Rocchetta Ligure)
- Palazzo Spinola-Celesia
- Palazzo Spinola di Luccoli-Balestrino
- Palazzo Spinola di Luccoli-Cervetto
- Palazzo Spinola di Pellicceria, Palazzo dei Rolli in the historical center of Genoa, included in the World Heritage Site Genoa: Le Strade Nuove and the system of the Palazzi dei Rolli
- Palazzo Spinola di San Luca
- Palazzo Spinola di San Luca-Gentile
- Palazzo Tommaso Spinola

Malta

- Spinola Palace (St. Julian's)
- Spinola Palace (Valletta)
