= Palazzo Giorgio Centurione =

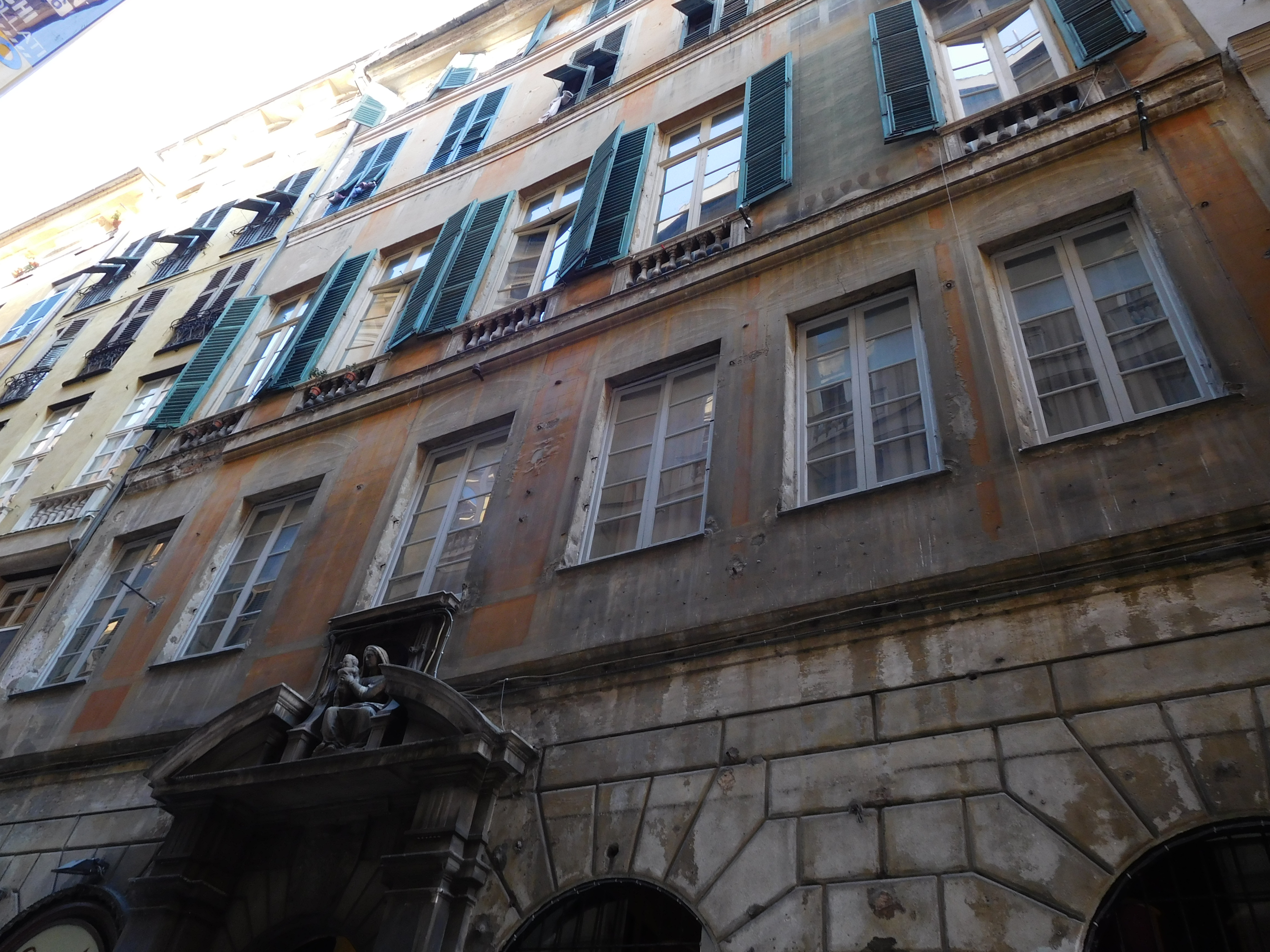
- Facade of the Palazzo Giorgio Centurione in via Lomellini 5
- Interactive map of the Palazzo Giorgio Centurione area

General information
- Status: In use
- Type: Palace
- Architectural style: Mannerist
- Location: Genoa, Italy, 5, Lomellini
- Coordinates: 44.412383°N 8.929436°E
- Current tenants: housing/offices
- Construction started: 16th century
- Completed: 16th century
- Renovated: 19th century

Design and construction
- Architect: Gaspare Corte
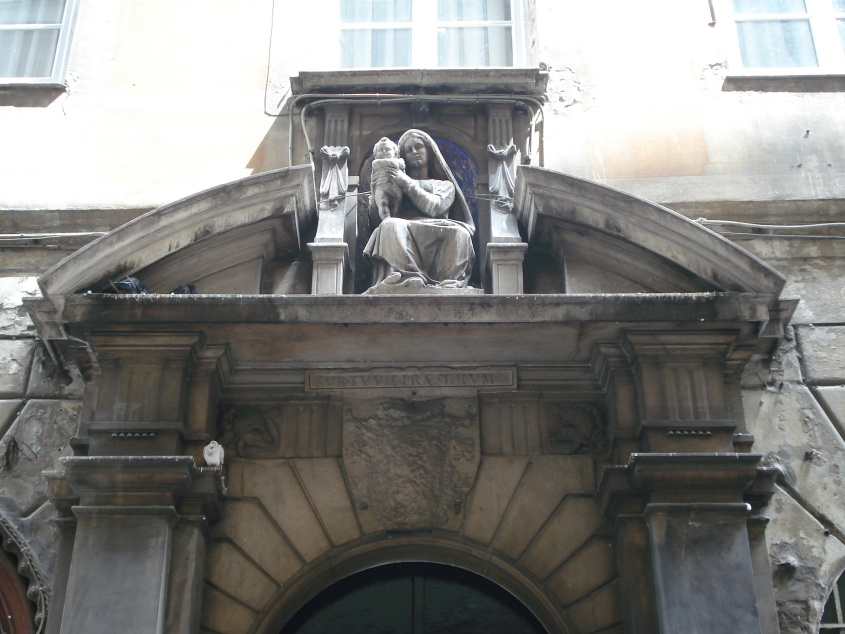

UNESCO World Heritage Site
- Part of: Genoa: Le Strade Nuove and the system of the Palazzi dei Rolli
- Criteria: Cultural: (ii)(iv)
- Reference: 1211
- Inscription: 2006 (30th Session)

The Palazzo Giorgio Centurione is a building located in Via Lomellini at no. 5 in the historical centre of Genoa, included on 13 July 2006 in the list of the 42 palaces inscribed in the Rolli di Genova that became World Heritage by UNESCO on that date.

== History ==
There is little information about the palace, which was built at the end of the 16th centuryprobably by the architect Gaspare Corte on the commission of Giorgio Centurione, later Doge of the Republic of Genoa in 1621–1622. Giorgio Centurione's daughter, Virginia (1587—1651), later married to Gaspare Grimaldi Bracelli, founder of the order of the Sisters of Our Lady of Refuge in Monte Calvario, was sanctified by Pope John Paul II in 2003. Known as Saint Virginia Centurione Bracelli, she started out in the building in Via Lomellini as a caregiver for poor girls, which was later continued in the convent of Monte Calvario, while the congregation of nuns she founded under the protection of Emanuele Brignole, founder of the Grande Albergo dei Poveri, took the name «brignoline».

The Doria family acquired it in the 18th century. Partially reconstructed in the 19th century (atrium and stairwell), it is currently joined to two other buildings behind it by a bridge over the closed vico del Leone and overlooking vico dell’Oro.

== Description ==
The façade has a painted decoration with cornices framing the windows, semicircular tympanums, architraves with a false mezzanine and under-window mirrors. Portal doric marble with pilaster strips supporting a semicircular tympanum housing an Enthroned Madonna and Child (Queen of the city), while traces of abraded noble arms can be seen at the key of the arch.
