= Palazzo Gio. Battista Grimaldi (Piazza San Luca) =

Palazzo Gio Battista Grimaldi (piazza San Luca)
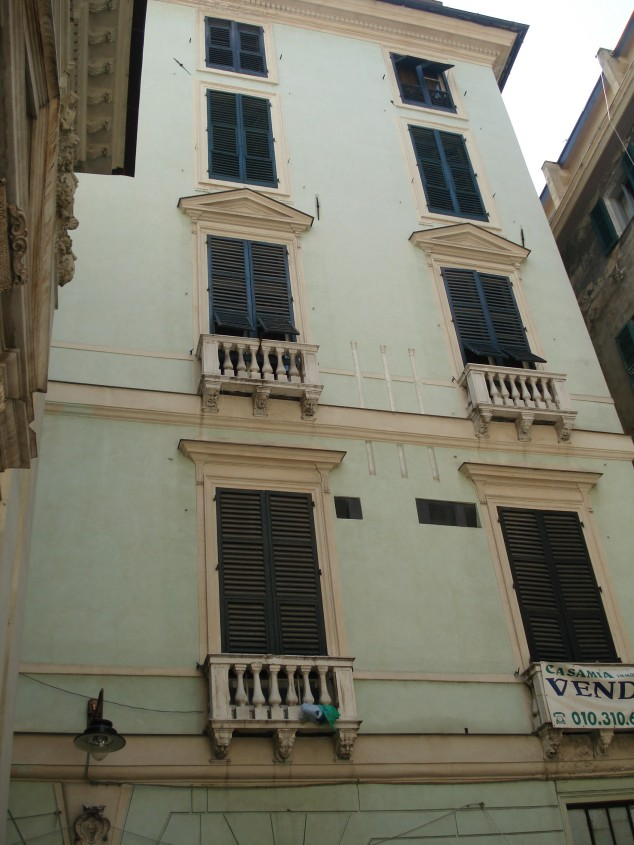
- Facade of the Palazzo Gio Battista Grimaldi in Piazza San Luca 2
- Interactive map of the Palazzo Gio Battista Grimaldi (piazza San Luca) area

General information
- Status: In use
- Type: Palace
- Architectural style: Mannerist
- Location: Genoa, Italy, 2, Piazza San Luca
- Coordinates: 44.410347°N 8.9301°E
- Current tenants: housing/offices
- Construction started: 16th century
- Completed: 16th century

UNESCO World Heritage Site
- Part of: Genoa: Le Strade Nuove and the system of the Palazzi dei Rolli
- Criteria: Cultural: (ii)(iv)
- Reference: 1211
- Inscription: 2006 (30th Session)

The Palazzo Gio Battista Grimaldi is a building located in Piazza San Luca at number 2 in the historical centre of Genoa, included on 13 July 2006 in the list of the 42 palaces inscribed in the Rolli di Genova that became World Heritage by UNESCO on that date. The Church of San Luca (Genoa) is located in the same square.

== History ==
Its history is linked to the square it overlooks, Piazza San Luca, where the aristocratic church of the Spinola and the Grimaldi has stood since 1188. In 1332, the square was rebuilt after more than half a century of struggles between the two families Grimaldi (Guelphs) and Spinola (Ghibellines) and, a century later, the Gabella Processionum of 1414 associates the block in question with a Spinola.

When in the 500 the palace took on its present character with the closing of the porticoes medieval crowning the square, it is Gio Batta Grimaldi, former senator of the Republic of Genoa, who is the first to appear in the Genovese Rolls (I bussolo); but the Spinola-Grimaldi succession still continuesː it is recorded in 1588 and 1599, in the name of Agostino Grimaldi quondam Gio. Batta (III bussolo) and in 1614 in the name of Paolo Spinola (II bussolo).

== Description ==
The main façade on the square, embellished with corbelled balconies and masks as well as the sober portal seventeenth century with the inscription «PARVO BENE», partially conceals on the second floor three columns corinthian masonry. Inside, the atrium and the loggiased staircase, which rises parallel to the main façade to the third floor, conclude the image of the 16th century noble palace built on medieval volumes, traces of which remain at the rear where a slate portal from the 16th century, a sign of an access prior to the construction of the palace and today unused, overlooks the narrow Vico della torre di San Luca.

== Bibliography ==
- Fiorella Caraceni (1992), Una strada rinascimentale: via Garibaldi a Genova, Genova, SAGEP
- Giorgio Doria (1995), Nobiltà e investimenti a Genova in Età moderna, Genova
- Gioconda Pomella (2007), Guida Completa ai Palazzi dei Rolli Genova, Genova, De Ferrari Editore(ISBN 9788871728155)
- Mauro Quercioli (2008), I Palazzi dei Rolli di Genova, Roma, Libreria dello Stato (ISBN 9788824011433)
- Fiorella Caraceni Poleggi (2001), Palazzi Antichi e Moderni di Genova raccolti e disegnati da Pietro Paolo Rubens (1652), Genova, Tormena Editore (ISBN 9788884801302)
- Mario Labò (2003), I palazzi di Genova di P.P. Rubens, Genova, Nuova Editrice Genovese
