= Palazzo Cattaneo Della Volta =

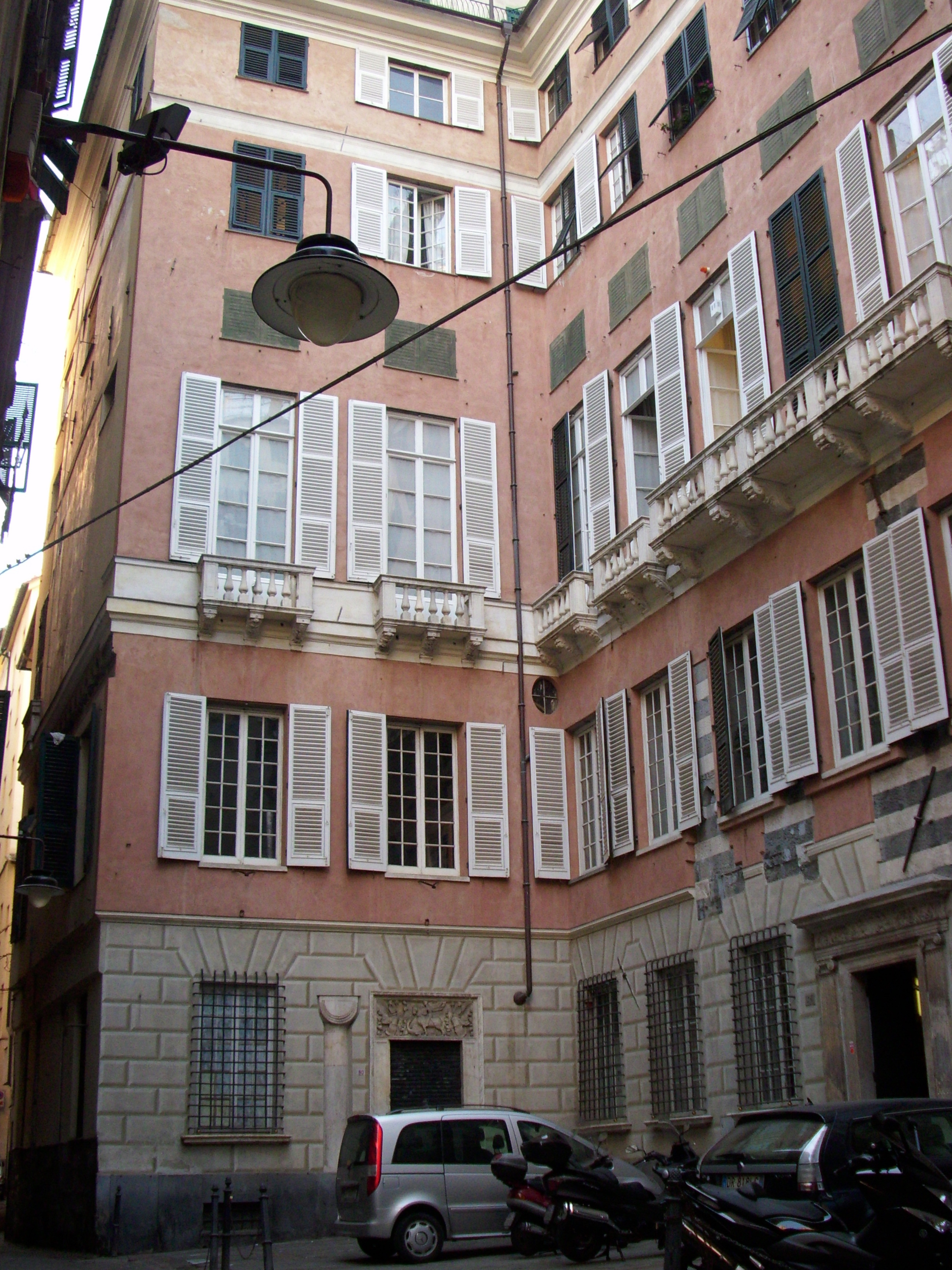
- Palazzo Cattaneo Della Volta in Piazza Cattaneo 26
- Interactive map of the Palazzo Cattaneo Della Volta area

General information
- Status: In use
- Type: Palace
- Architectural style: Mannerist, Baroque
- Location: Genoa, Italy, 26, Piazza Cattaneo
- Coordinates: 44.406992°N 8.928206°E
- Current tenants: housing/offices
- Construction started: 16th century
- Completed: 16th century

Design and construction
- Architect: Bartolomeo Bianco

The Palazzo Cattaneo Della Volta, also called Palazzo Cattaneo di San Torpete or Palazzo di Nicolò Cattaneo, is a building located in Piazza Cattaneo at number 26 in the historical centre of Genoa. The building was included in the list of palaces inscribed in the Rolli di Genova.

== History and description ==
Situated in a strategic position, between the market of San Giorgio and the Ripa, it is an example of a long-lasting property; the Cattaneo della Volta family have had their hotel and their Church of San Torpete here since the 12th century. The considerable fortunes of the Cattaneo (family) were linked to the trade in textiles with Flanders. Filippo Cattaneo was the owner of a trading company in Antwerp from 1562, and from 1584 he held the position of consul of the 'Genoese Nation' in that city.

Visibly documenting this long duration are the octagonal pillar with cubic capital and the bas-relief with St. George and the dragon on the south side of the square. Present in all rolls since 1599, the building is the result of the amalgamation of two medieval lots. The interventions commissioned by Leila Cattaneo and carried out by the architect Bartolomeo Bianco, who also carried out a general renovation with the raising of one floor, date back to 1623. The baroque façade is embellished by the portal of Ionic order in white marble. It was the subject of a recent partial restoration that revealed traces of squaring on the upper floors of the façade on the axis of Via delle Grazie with frescoes provisionally assigned to the late Middle Ages.

In 1739 Nicolò Cattaneo commissioned the Bolognese painter Giacomo Antonio Boni to decorate a drawing room, with Diana and Endymion frescoed on the vault.

The palace was damaged both in the Naval Bombardment of Genoa (1684) of Louis XIV of France in 1684, and more severely in 1941, the top two floors were destroyed by bombing and later rebuilt by raising one floor.

Of exceptional richness was the picture gallery of the palace, which included in particular nine portraits by Antoon Van Dyck depicting various members of the Cattaneo family, displayed in special quadratures frescoed by Giacomo Antonio Boni, in the «Van Dyck drawing room». Among them were in particular the Portrait of a Lady with Golden Chain (c.d. Giovanna Cattaneo), now in the Frick Collection, New York, the celebrated Portrait of Marchesa Elena Grimaldi Cattaneo and the portraits of her two children, Filippo Cattaneo and Maddalena Cattaneo, (1623) now in the National Gallery of Art, Washington. Following the death of Marquis Giuseppe Cattaneo (1825—1906), the famous picture gallery was sold by the heirs to American collectors, despite the great scandal aroused at the time and the consequent trial for violation of the law on the export of paintings.

== Picture Gallery ==
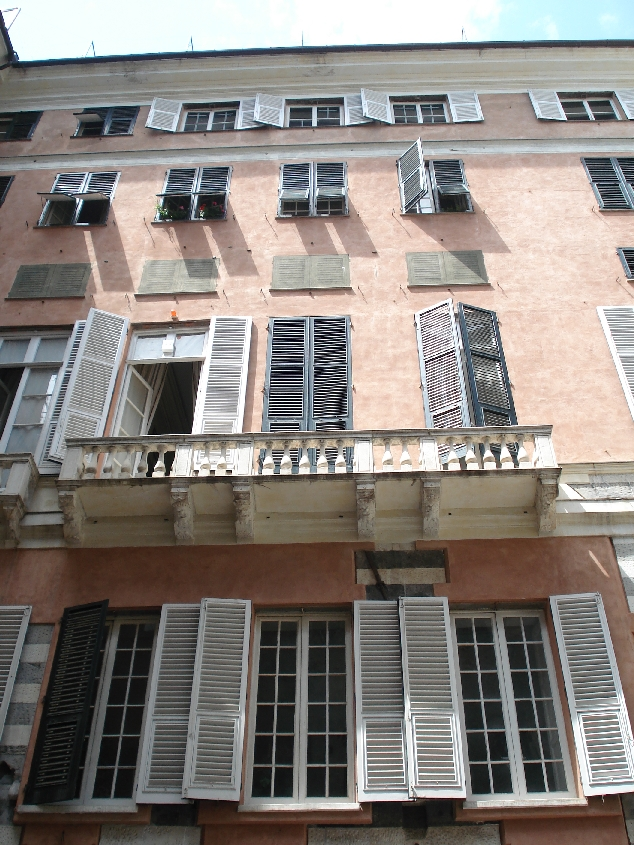
The facade of the palace

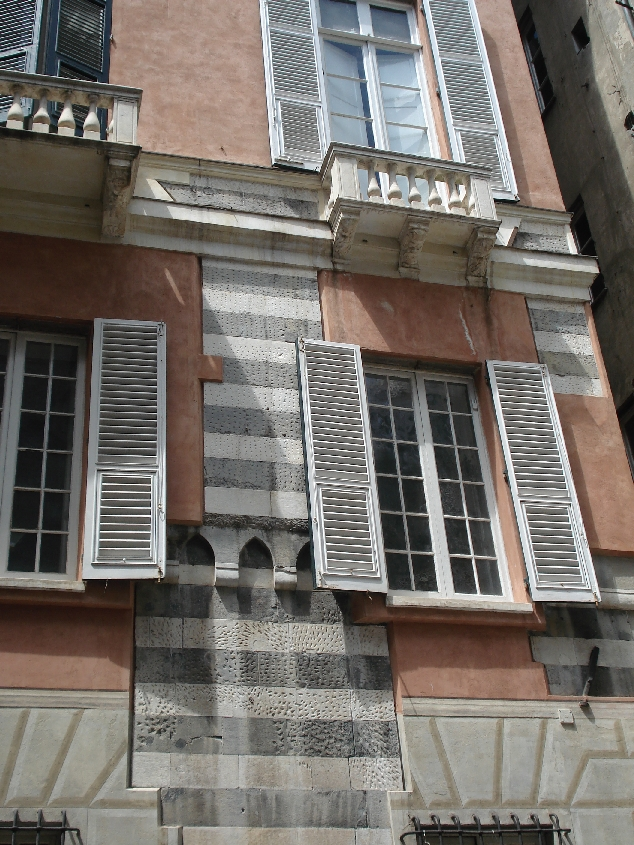
Particular of the facade

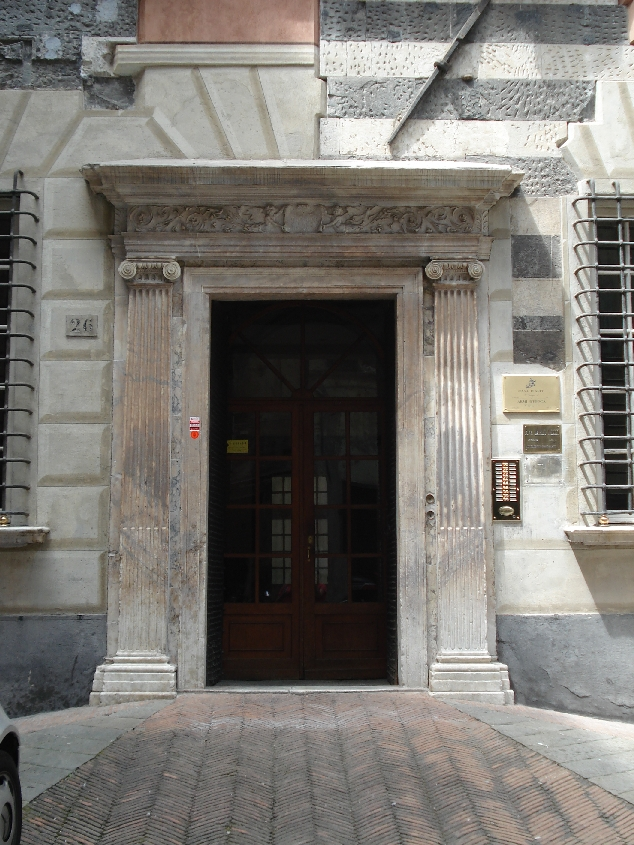
The main portal

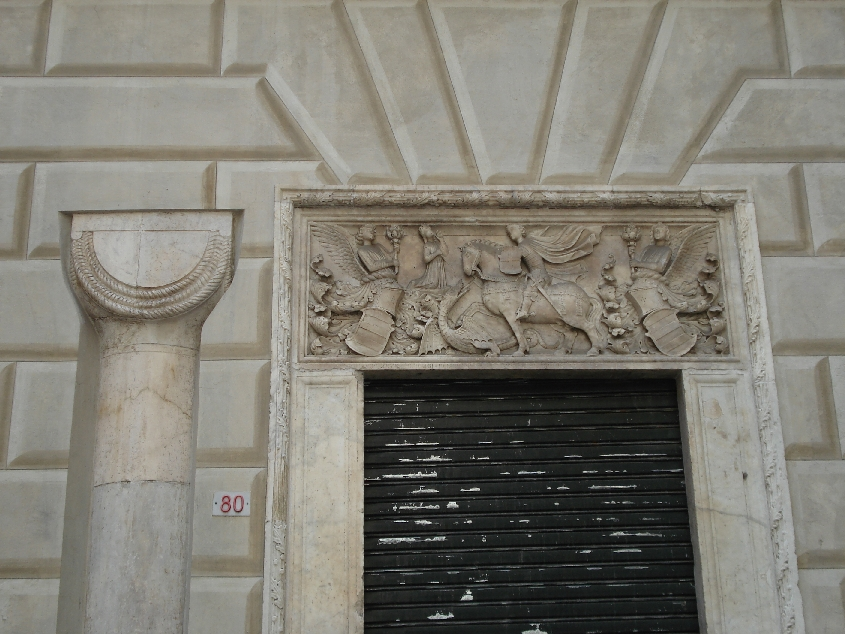
The bas-relief of Saint George and the dragon on the façade south of the square

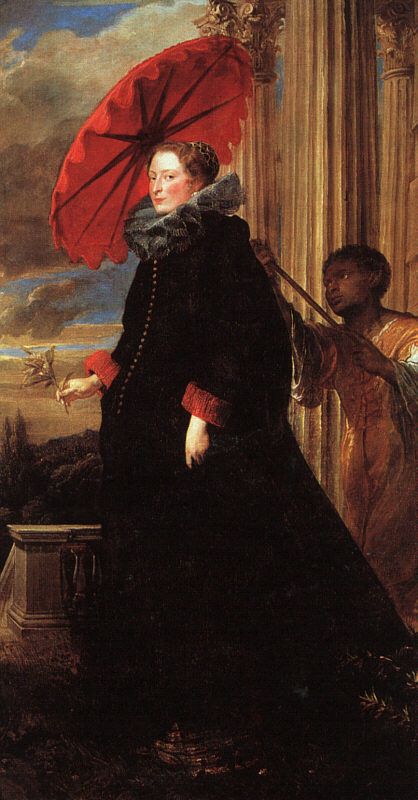
Portrait of Elena Grimaldi Cattaneo, Anthony van Dyck.

.
