= Palazzo Nicolo Spinola di Luccoli =

Palazzo Nicolò Spinola di Luccoli
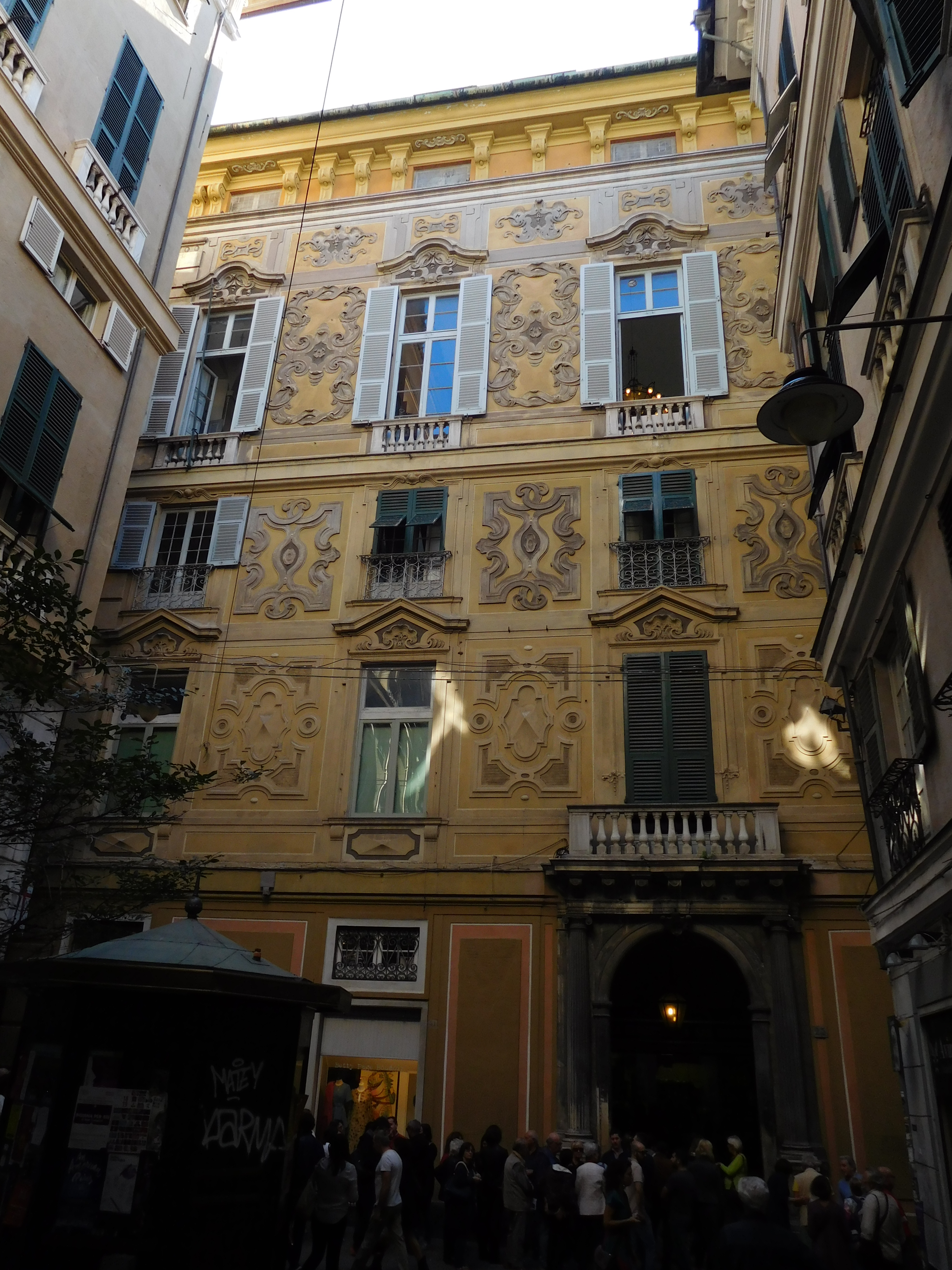
- Facade of the Palazzo Nicolò Spinola di Luccoli in via Luccoli 23
- Interactive map of the Palazzo Nicolò Spinola di Luccoli area
- Alternative names: Palazzo Spinola Franzoni

General information
- Status: In use
- Type: Palace
- Architectural style: Mannerist
- Location: Genoa, Italy, 23, Luccoli
- Coordinates: 44.409761°N 8.933858°E
- Current tenants: housing/offices
- Construction started: 16th century
- Completed: 16th century

The Palazzo Nicolò Spinola di Luccoli, also called Palazzo del Marchese Stefano Franzone, or Palazzo Spinola Franzone, is a building located in Via Luccoli at number 23, in the area of the Soziglia Market in the historic centre of Genoa. The building was included in the list of palaces inscribed in the Rolli di Genova. The architecture, the decoration of the façade and the frescoes by Domenico Parodi in some of the interior rooms make it a relevant example of Genoese Baroque.

== History and description ==
Defined in 1414 as the domus cum vacuo et vindario of the heirs of Angelo De Mari and purchased in 1459 by Eliano Spinola, it was rebuilt before 1560 by Nicolò Spinola Marquis of Vergagni and then renovated by his son Daniele.

He was in fact the owner when, in 1576, the palace was assimilated into the richest in the city and thus included in the most representative class of the first rollo. Present in the following rolli, always in prominent positions, it dominated what was the 'piazza dei De Mari' (today piazza Luccoli) and was flanked in 1587 by a further piazza, created by the demolition of a house belonging to Giacomo Spinola.

The new palace probably took up the compositional scheme of the old building, developing along a central axis with a sequence of spaces leading from the square into the garden, according to a transparency that is impossible to perceive today due to multiple infills. Tommaso Franzone purchased it in 1606, later the building was raised and modified internally and the facade adorned with stucco. It is included in the 1622 edition of Palazzi di Genova by Pieter Paul Rubens as «Palazzo del sig. Daniel Spinola».

A well-stocked picture gallery, famous sculptures by Algardi and frescoes (including two drawing rooms by Domenico Parodi, one of which dedicated to Laura and Petrarch) made it worthy of mention in early 19th-century guide books; today, despite the division into sixteen flats, it retains its monumental character thanks to the large atrium (architecture) vaulted hall, the grand staircase that still serves the first three floors and the large loggia-covered stairwell overlooking the courtyard.

The interior rooms contain frescoes with Allegories of Petrarchan Poetry and Apollo and the Muses, late Baroque masterpieces painted around 1710 by Domenico Parodi.

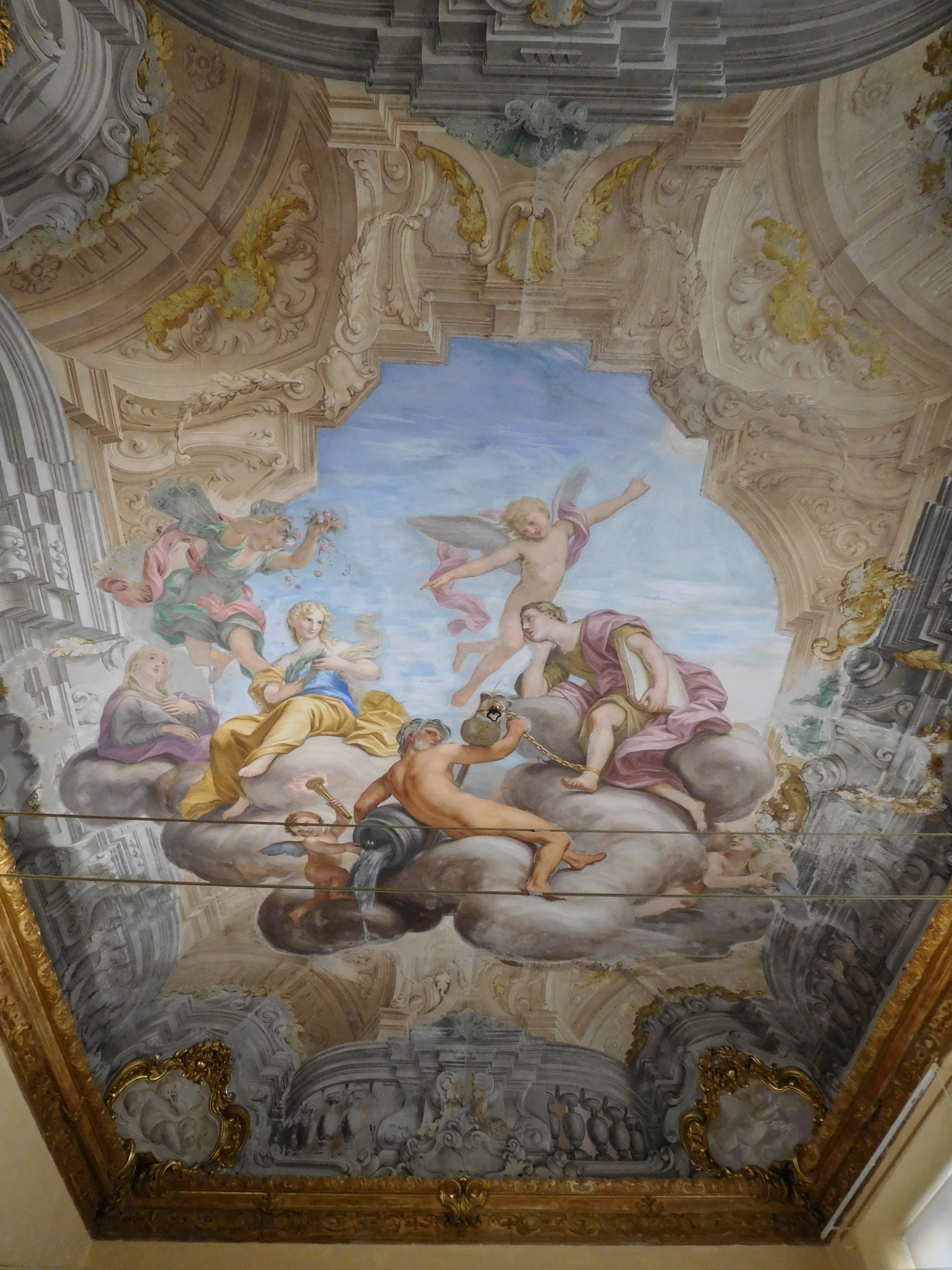
Allegories of Petrarchan Poetry, 1710, Domenico Parodi

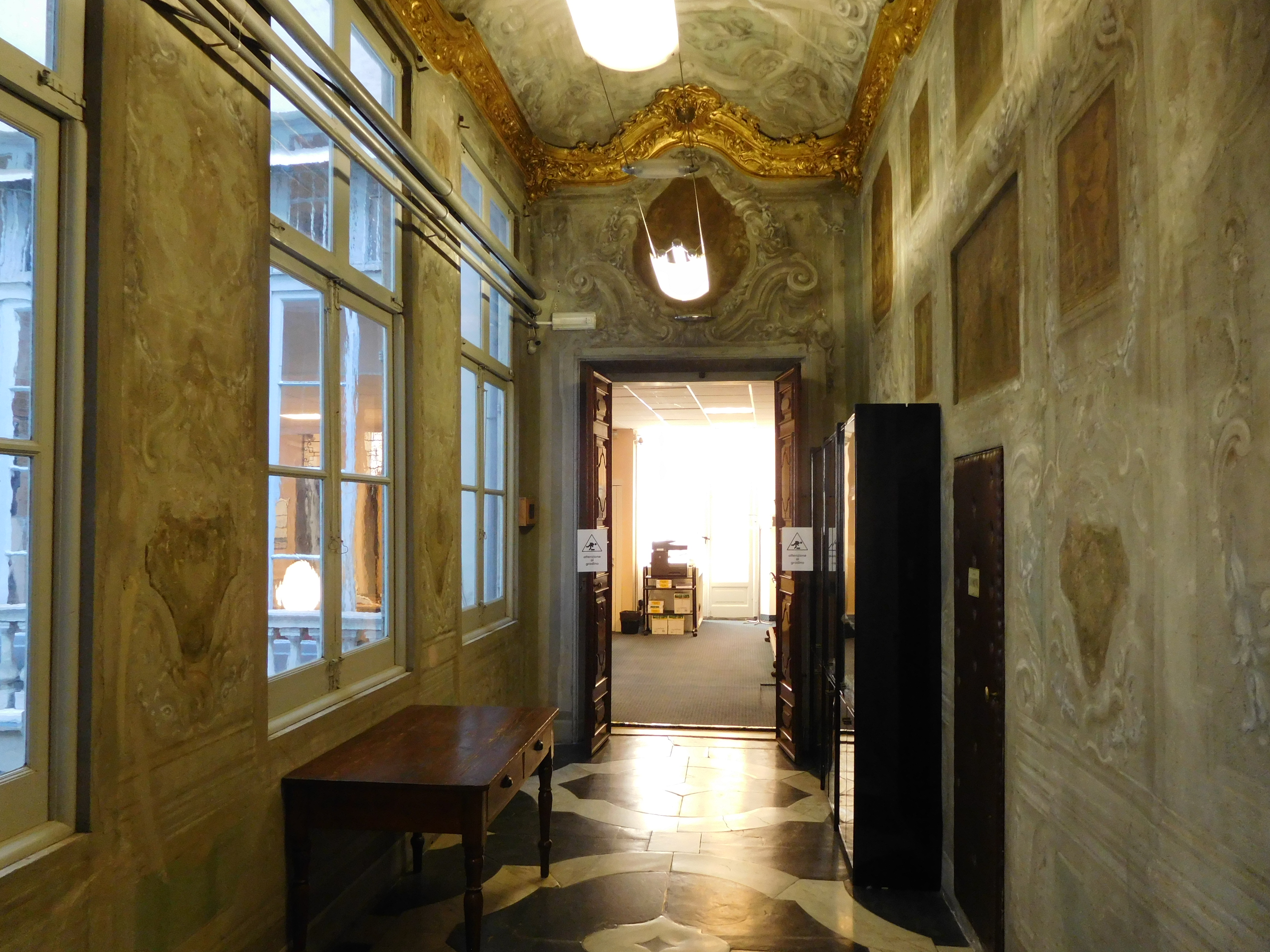
Gallery

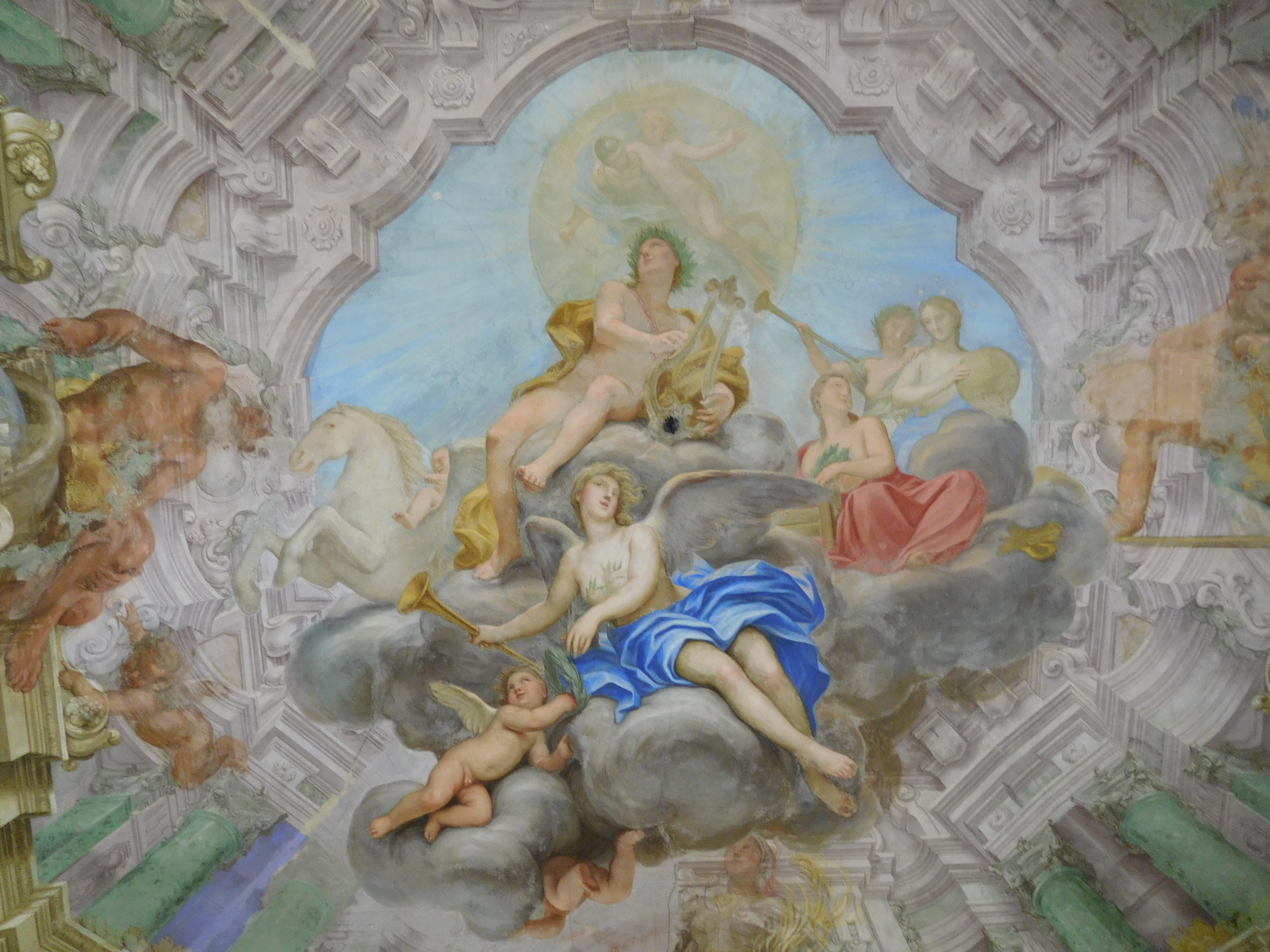
Apollo and the Muses, 1710, Domenico Parodi

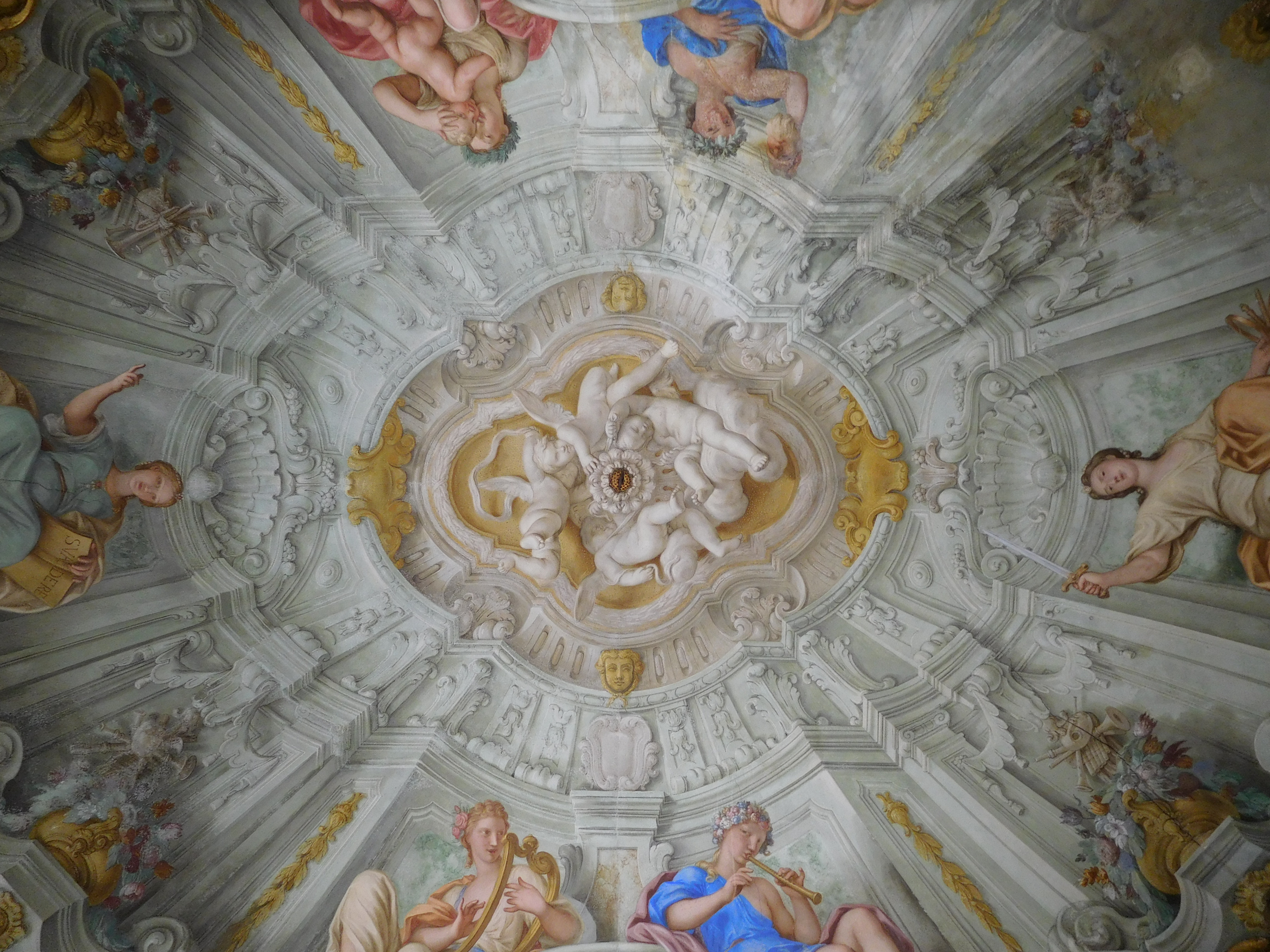
Volta fresco, Domenico Parodi
