= Palazzo Giorgio Spinola =

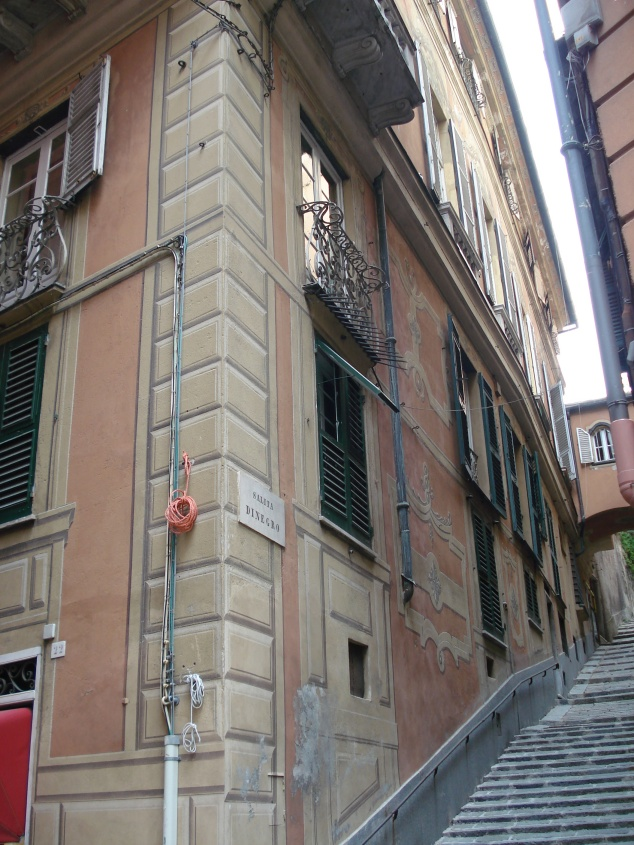
- Interactive map of the Palazzo Giorgio Spinola area
- Alternative names: Palazzo Franzone

General information
- Status: In use
- Type: Palace
- Architectural style: Mannerist
- Location: Genoa, Italy, 4 Salita di Santa Caterina
- Coordinates: 44.410186°N 8.936022°E
- Construction started: 16th century
- Completed: 16th century

Design and construction
- Architects: Giovan Battista Castello and Bernardo Cantone

UNESCO World Heritage Site
- Part of: Genoa: Le Strade Nuove and the system of the Palazzi dei Rolli
- Criteria: Cultural: (ii)(iv)
- Reference: 1211
- Inscription: 2006 (30th Session)

The palazzo Giorgio Spinola is a building located in salita di Santa Caterina at no. 4 in Genoa, included on 13 July 2006 in the list of the 42 palaces inscribed in the Rolli di Genova that were declared World Heritage by UNESCO on that date.

== History and description ==
It appears in the rollo of 1588 in the name of the heirs of Gio Batta Spinola, while it later passed to Agostino Ayrolo. Situated in the Spinola di Luccoli district, next to the ancient convent of Santa Caterina (founded by the Clarisse in 1228), the palace would appear to predate the first inscription.

The loggia staircase around the inner courtyard with fountain (now covered in glass cement) leads to a large area towards villetta Dinegro.

Ancora un documento evidente di quanto fosse difficile «fabbrica in costa» via via che si alzavano fabbriche sul lato a monte, come era avvenuto nei palazzi a nord di Strada Nuova opportunamente tracciata in quota.

In 1798 it still belonged to the Ayrolo family, who renovated it, replacing the external marble portal, updating the details of the atrium, adding railings to the windows and decorating the drawing rooms. Here lived the Doge Giovanni Battista Ayroli (1783–85).

In the 19th century it passed to the Franzoni family, before 1818, and finally to the Tedeschi family. Recent maintenance has restored the square decoration of the façades facing salita di Santa Caterina and salita Di Negro.

== Gallery ==
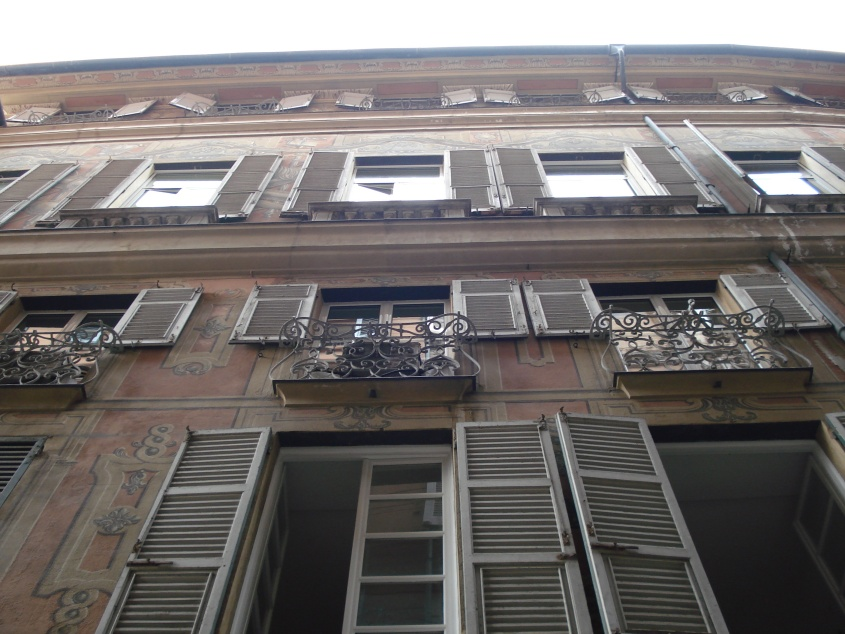
Facade of the palace

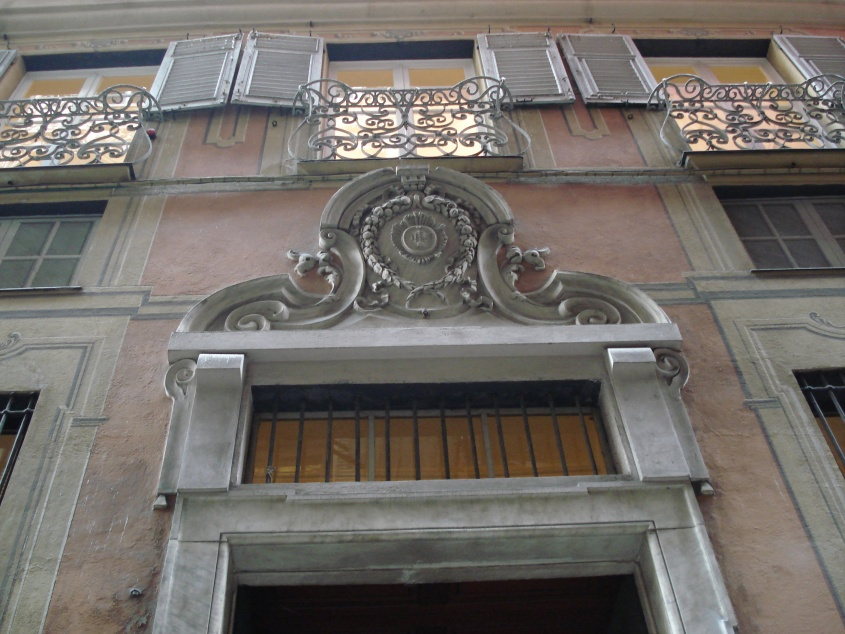
Palace portal

Atrium fountain in the form of a nymphaeum

== Bibliography ==
=== Italian sources ===
- Gioconda Pomella (2007), Guida Completa ai Palazzi dei Rolli Genova, Genova, De Ferrari Editore(ISBN 9788871728155)
- Touring Club Italiano, Liguria, Guida d’Italia, sesta ed., Milano, 1982.
- Ennio Poleggi, L'Invenzione dei Rolli. Genova Città di Palazzi, in Edizioni Skira, Milano – 2004 (ISBN 88-8491-826-X)
