= Palazzo Pietro Spinola di San Luca =

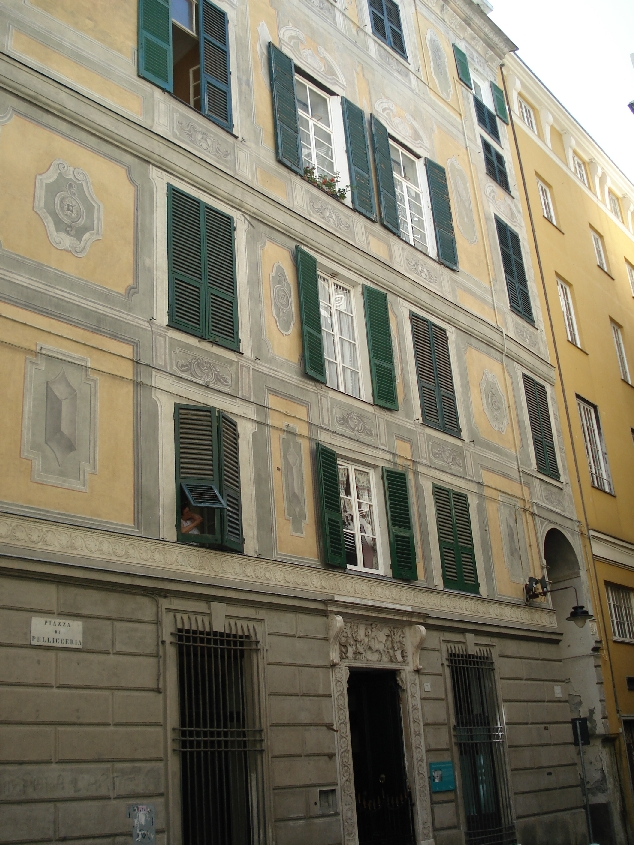
- Façade of Palazzo Pietro Spinola di San Luca

General information
- Status: Intact
- Type: Palace
- Architectural style: Renaissance
- Location: 3, Piazza di Pellicceria, Genoa, Italy
- Coordinates: 44°24′38.42″N 8°55′49.85″E
- Named for: Pietro Spinola
- Completed: 16th century

Palazzo Pietro Spinola di San Luca is a 16th-century palace in Piazza di Pellicceria, Genoa, Italy. It is now a private residence, and it remains in good condition. It is one of the Palazzi dei Rolli, but it is not listed by UNESCO as World Heritage Site.

The building faces the Palazzo Spinola di Pellicceria, overlooking the square. The building was included in the rolli of 1588, 1599 and 1614. It still has a well-preserved 16th-century atrium and a grand staircase, part of which was reconstructed after being damaged by bombardment in World War II.

The palace's façade contains an ornate marble portal decorated by reliefs of vines and bunches of grapes, and topped by a sculpture of Saint George and the Dragon.
