= Genoa: Le Strade Nuove and the system of the Palazzi dei Rolli =

UNESCO World Heritage Site
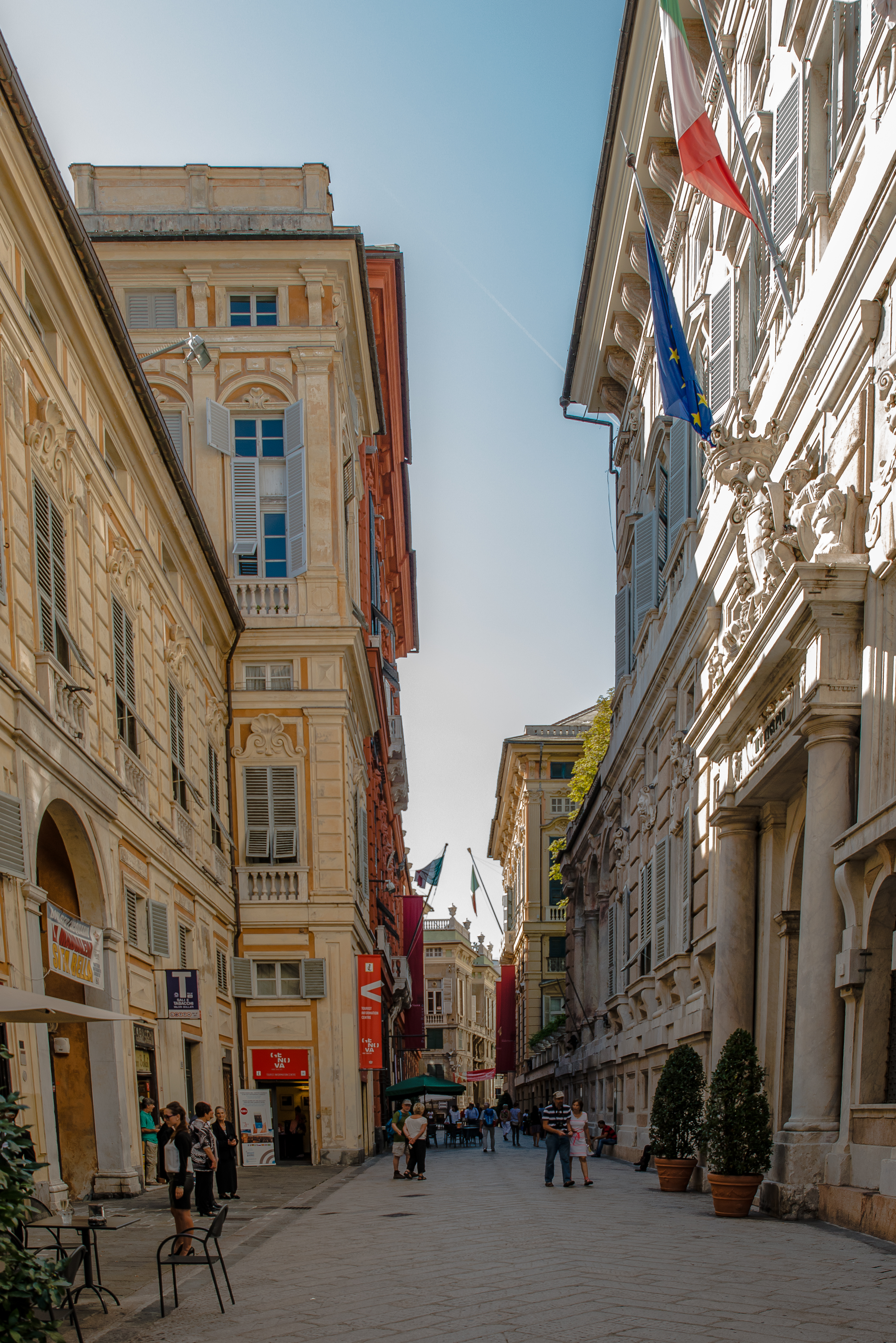
- A glimpse of Strada Nuova

- Location within Liguria
- Location: Genoa, Liguria, Italy
- Criteria: Cultural: (ii)(iv)
- Reference: 1211
- Inscription: 2006 (30th Session)
- Area: 15.777 ha (38.99 acres)
- Buffer zone: 113 ha (280 acres)
- Coordinates: 44°24′44″N 8°55′52″E

Genoa: Le Strade Nuove and the system of the Palazzi dei Rolli is a UNESCO World Heritage Site which includes a number of streets and palaces in the center of Genoa, in Northwestern Italy.

- The Strade Nuove (Italian for "New Streets") are a group of streets built by the Genoese aristocracy during the expansion of the city at a time when the Republic of Genoa was at the height of its financial and seafaring power. These are Via Giuseppe Garibaldi (1558–1583, formerly Strada Maggiore or Strada Nuova) and Via Balbi (1602–1620, formerly Strada Balbi), later followed by Via Cairoli (1778–1786, formerly Strada Nuovissima).
- The Palazzi dei Rolli (Italian for "Palaces of the Lists") are a group of palaces - most of which also date from the late 16th and early 17th centuries - which were associated to a particular system of ‘public lodging’ in private residences, whereby notable guests on State visit to the Republic were hosted in one of these palaces on behalf of the State.

On 13 July 13, 2006, forty-two of the 163 palaces originally included in one the five public list called "Rolli" (Italian for "lists") were selected as a World Heritage Site by the UNESCO special committee meeting in Vilnius (Lithuania). The site includes an ensemble of Renaissance and Baroque palaces along the so-called ‘new streets’ (Strade Nuove), which offer an extraordinary variety of different solutions, achieving universal value in adapting to the particular characteristics of the site and to the requirements of a specific social and economic organization. They also offer an original example of a public network of private residences designated to host state visits.

On January 20, 2007, UNESCO unveiled a plaque in via Garibaldi, the former Strada Nuova, explaining the reasons for inclusion of the Strade Nuove and the system of the Palazzi dei Rolli within the World Heritage Sites:

The largest homes, various in shape and distribution, that were chosen at random in the lists (rolli) to host visits of state. The buildings, often built on sloping land, formed of a stepped atrium - courtyard - staircase - garden and rich interior decorations, express a singular social and economic identity and commencement of modern age urban architecture in Europe.

Some of the Palazzi dei Rolli are used today as public buildings, museums, offices and private residences. Among the palaces open to the public, Palazzo Rosso, Palazzo Bianco and Palazzo Doria Tursi jointly constitute the Strada Nuova Museums located in via Garibaldi.

== The Rolli of Genoa ==
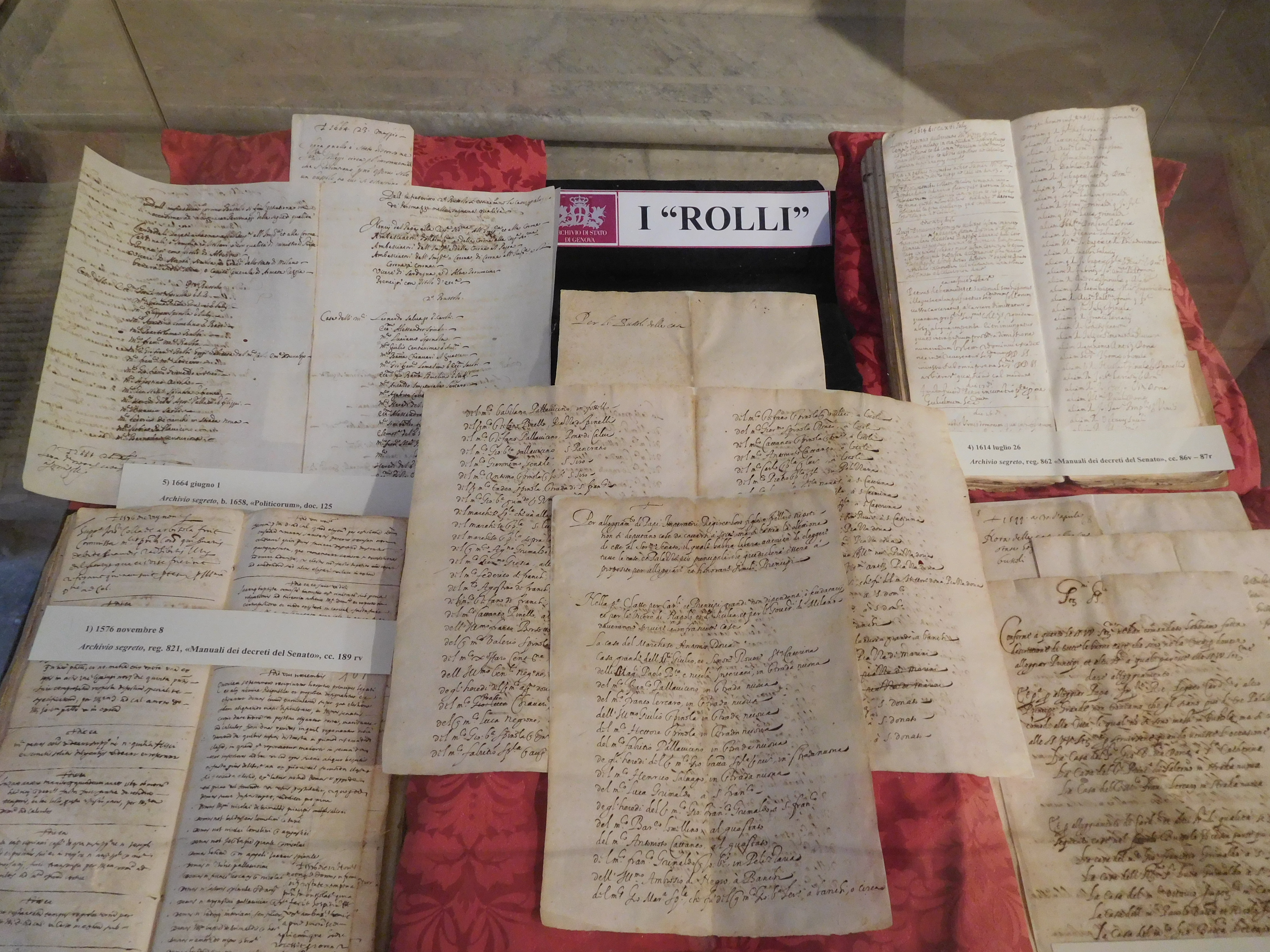
The official Rolli of the Republic of Genoa

The Rolli di Genova—more precisely, the Rolli degli alloggiamenti pubblici di Genova (Italian for "Lists of the public lodgings of Genoa") were the official lists at the time of the Republic of Genoa of the private palaces and mansions, belonging to the most distinguished Genoese families, which—if chosen through a public lottery—were obliged to host on behalf of the Government the most notable visitors during their State visit to the Republic.

Later, these palaces hosted many famous visitors to Genoa during their Grand Tour, a cultural itinerary around Italy.

Today, Palazzi dei Rolli as a collective name represents the set of the most prestigious palaces of the historical center of Genoa, especially along the so-called Strade Nuove, the "New Streets" built by the Genoese aristocracy at the peak of Genoa's economic power in the 16th and 17th century (Via Giuseppe Garibaldi, formerly Strada Nuova or Via Aurea, Via Cairoli, formerly Strada Nuovissima, and via Balbi, now the home of the University of Genoa).

== History ==
Between the first half of the 16th century and the first half of the 17th century, the Genoese nobility started a careful town planning to transform the existing medieval city and initiate a sizeable urban expansion to the North. The move to expand the antique palaces and to build new sumptuous ones was driven by the extraordinary wealth that came into the city through prosperous financing activities towards several European powers. In particular, the Genoese aristocracy financed the expensive undertakings of the Spanish Crown, such as the mercenary army that Spain kept in Flanders from 1566 to the peace of Westphalia in 1648. The ruling class of Genoa, mixing nobility of blood with new mercantile wealth, sought to underpin their prestige by the construction of grand city palaces and suburban villas of unusual splendor.

The Rolli—more precisely, the Rolli degli alloggiamenti pubblici di Genova (Italian for "Lists of the public lodgings of Genoa")—were official lists established in 1576 by the Genoese Senate—an aristocratic institution which took prominence as a result of the oligarchic reforms of the Prince and Admiral Andrea Doria—to determine the palaces available to the Government to ensure that the Republic of Genoa could offer appropriate lodging to the most notable guests who routinely visited the city, such as princes, kings, diplomats or religious authorities. The fact that not one single palace was chosen, but many, was a sign that the authorities of the Republic of Genoa considered the whole city as a "republican royal palace".

The Palazzi dei Rolli were subdivided on the basis of their prestige into three categories—with size, beauty and importance as main criteria—for selecting whether each palace was suitable to accommodate cardinals, princes and viceroys, feudal lords, ambassadors or governors. Only three palaces were deemed suitable to accommodate the highest dignitaries, such as Popes, Emperors, Kings and most important Cardinals and Princes: the Palazzo Doria Spinola in Salita Santa Caterina, the Palazzo Grimaldi Doria Tursi in today's via Garibaldi and the Palazzo Lercari Parodi, also in the current Via Garibaldi.

The "Rolli" or "Lists" preserved to this day were five: 1576 (including 52 palaces); 1588 (111); 1599 (150); 1614 (96); and 1664 (95). In total, there were 162 palaces included at least once in one of these official lists.

== Quotes ==
- Bring the letter to Mrs. Mojon, in via Balbi; this is one of the three names of one major street, which is also the most beautiful of Italy (Stendhal, Journal d'un vojage en Italie et en Suisse pendant l'annee 1828, 1828)
- I tried to visit three galleries of famous paintings in via Balbi. As the owners have the good habit of living in the rooms where the paintings are located, one needs to call several times; and often the impatience generated in me by the arrogant refusals of the servants takes away the joy of seeing the paintings. The rich of Genoa live almost always on the third floor to be able to see the sea. The staircases are made of marble, but when - after climbing one hundred of those steps - a servant keeps you waiting for fifteen minutes then says: "His Excellency is still in his room, come back tomorrow", it is allowed to show a bout of ill temper, especially when one needs to leave in the evening (Stendhal, Memoires d'un touriste, 1837)

== World Heritage Site ==
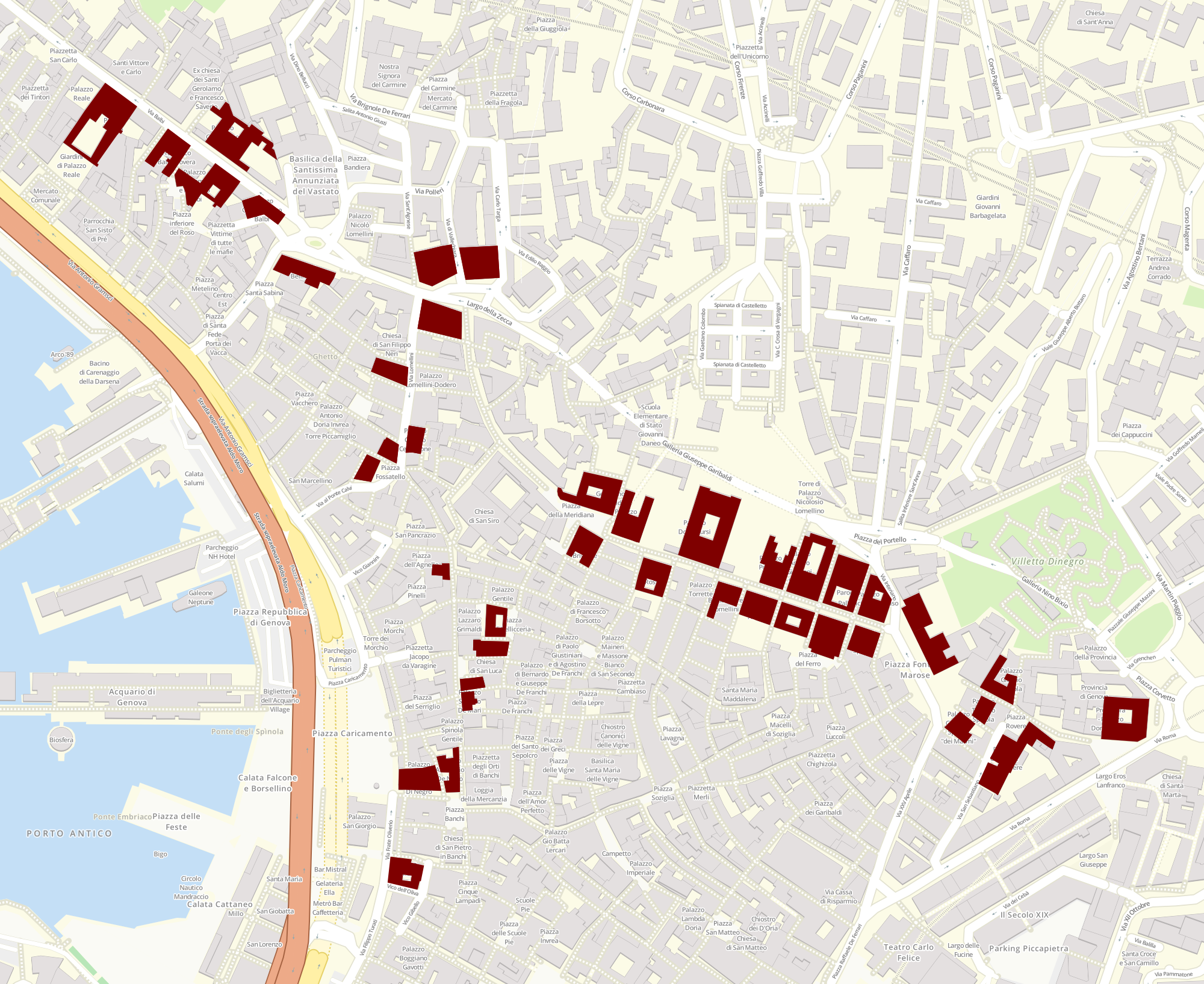
Map of the Strade Nuove and the Palazzi dei Rolli included in the UNESCO World Heritage Site

Le Strade Nuove and the system of the Palazzi dei Rolli became a World Heritage Site in 2006. The criteria for this selection were explained by the UNESCO as follows:

- Criterion (ii): The ensemble of the Strade Nuove and the related palaces exhibit an important interchange of values on the development of architecture and town planning in the 16th and 17th centuries. Through the architectural treatises of the time, these examples were publicized making the Strade Nuove and the late-Renaissance palaces of Genoa a significant landmark in the development of Mannerist and Baroque architecture in Europe.
- Criterion (iv): The Strade Nuove in Genoa are an outstanding example of an urban ensemble consisting of aristocratic palaces of high architectural value, which illustrate the economy and politics of the mercantile city of Genoa at the height of its power in the 16th and 17th centuries. The project proposed a new and innovative spirit that characterized the Siglo de los Genoveses (1563 to 1640). In 1576, the Republic of Genoa established a legally based list of Rolli recognizing the most outstanding palaces for official lodging of distinguished guests.

== The Palazzi dei Rolli included in the World Heritage Site ==
These are the forty-two palaces currently included by UNESCO in the World Heritage Site:

No.	Original Owner	Location	Current name of the Palace	Photo
1	Antonio Doria	Largo Lanfranco, 1, Genoa	Palazzo Doria Spinola	
2	Clemente Della Rovere	Piazza Della Rovere, 1, Genoa	Palazzo Clemente Della Rovere	
3	Gio. Battista Spinola	Salita Santa Caterina, 4, Genoa	Palazzo Giorgio Spinola	
4	Tommaso Spinola	Salita Santa Caterina, 3, Genoa	Palazzo Tommaso Spinola	
5	Giacomo Spinola	Piazza Fontane Marose, 6, Genoa	Palazzo Giacomo Spinola "dei Marmi"	
6	Antonio Doria	Piazza Fontane Marose, 3–4, Genoa	Palazzo Ayrolo Negrone	
7	Paolo e Nicolò Interiano	Piazza Fontane Marose, 2, Genoa	Palazzo Interiano Pallavicini	
8	Agostino Pallavicini	Via Giuseppe Garibaldi, 1, Genoa	Palazzo Cambiaso Pallavicini	
9	Pantaleo Spinola	Via Giuseppe Garibaldi, 2, Genoa	Palazzo Spinola Gambaro	
10	Franco Lercari	Via Giuseppe Garibaldi, 3, Genoa	Palazzo Lercari-Parodi	
11	Tobia Pallavicini	Via Giuseppe Garibaldi, 4, Genoa	Palazzo Carrega-Cataldi	
12	Angelo Giovanni Spinola	Via Giuseppe Garibaldi, 5, Genoa	Palazzo Angelo Giovanni Spinola	
13	Andrea and Gio. Battista Spinola	Via Giuseppe Garibaldi, 6, Genoa	Palazzo Doria	
14	Nicolosio Lomellino	Via Giuseppe Garibaldi, 7, Genoa	Palazzo Nicolosio Lomellino	
15	Lazzaro and Giacomo Spinola	Via Giuseppe Garibaldi, 8–10, Genoa	Palazzo Cattaneo-Adorno	
16	Nicolò Grimaldi	Via Giuseppe Garibaldi, 9, Genoa	Palazzo Doria Tursi (City Hall)	
17	Baldassarre Lomellini	via Giuseppe Garibaldi, 12, Genoa	Palazzo Campanella o di Baldassarre Lomellini	
18	Luca Grimaldi	Via Giuseppe Garibaldi, 11, Genoa	Palazzo Bianco	
19	Rodolfo and Francesco Brignole Sale	Via Giuseppe Garibaldi, 18, Genoa	Palazzo Rosso	
20	Gerolamo Grimaldi	Salita San Francesco, 4, Genoa	Palazzo Gerolamo Grimaldi	
21	Gio Carlo Brignole	Piazza della Meridiana, 2, Genoa	Palazzo Durazzo Brignole	
22	Bartolomeo Lomellino	Largo Della Zecca, 4, Genoa	Palazzo Rostan Reggio	
23	Stefano Lomellini	Via Cairoli, 18, Genoa	Palazzo Lomellini-Doria Lamba	
24	Giacomo Lomellini and Cattaneo De Marini	Largo della Zecca, 2, Genoa	Palazzo Giacomo Lomellini	
25	Antoniotto Cattaneo	Piazza della Nunziata, 2, Genoa	Palazzo Belimbau	
26	Gio. Agostino Balbi	Via Balbi, 1, Genoa	Palazzo Durazzo-Pallavicini	
27	Gio Francesco Balbi	Via Balbi, 2, Genoa	Palazzo Balbi Cattaneo	
28	Giacomo and Pantaleo Balbi	Via Balbi, 4, Genoa	Palazzo Balbi Senarega	
29	Francesco Balbi Piovera	Via Balbi, 6, Genoa	Palazzo Balbi Piovera Raggio	
30	Stefano Balbi	Via Balbi, 10, Genoa	Royal Palace of Genoa	
31	Cosmo Centurione	Via Lomellini, 8, Genoa	Palazzo Cosmo Centurione	
32	Giorgio Centurione	Via Lomellini, 5, Genoa	Palazzo Giorgio Centurione	
33	Gio. Battista Centurione	Via del Campo, 1, Genoa	Palazzo Gio Battista Centurione	
34	Cipriano Pallavicini	Piazza Fossatello, 2, Genoa	Palazzo Cipriano Pallavicini	
35	Nicolò Spinola	Via San Luca, 14, Genoa	Palazzo Nicolò Spinola	
36	Francesco Grimaldi	Piazza di Pellicceria, 1, Genoa	Palazzo Spinola di Pellicceria	
37	Gio. Battista Grimaldi	Vico San Luca, 4, Genoa	Palazzo Gio Battista Grimaldi (Vico San Luca)	
38	Gio. Battista Grimaldi	Piazza San Luca, 2, Genoa	Palazzo Gio. Battista Grimaldi (Piazza San Luca)	
39	Stefano De Mari	Via San Luca, 5, Genoa	Palazzo Stefano De Mari	
40	Ambrogio Di Negro	via San Luca, 2, Genoa	Palazzo Ambrogio Di Negro	
41	Emanuele Filiberto Di Negro	Via al Ponte Reale, 2, Genoa	Palazzo Emanuele Filiberto Di Negro	
42	De Marini	Piazza De Marini, 1, Genoa	Palazzo De Marini Croce	

== The Palazzi dei Rolli not included in the UNESCO list ==
The following Palazzi dei Rolli are still preserved but, due to partitioning or altered use, have not been included in the UNESCO World Heritage Site:

	Owner	Location	Palace	Image
1	Ottavio Imperiale	Piazza Campetto, 2, Genoa	Palazzo Ottavio Imperiale	
2	Gio. Vincenzo Imperiale	Piazza Campetto 8A	Palazzo Gio Vincenzo Imperiale	
3		Largo G. A. Sanguineti 11	Palazzo Senarega-Zoagli	
4		Piazza Cattaneo 26	Palazzo Cattaneo Della Volta	
5	Giulio Pallavicini	Piazza De Ferrari 2	Palazzo Giulio Pallavicini	
6	Agostino Spinola	Piazza De Ferrari 3	Palazzo Agostino Spinola	
7	Pietro Durazzo	Piazza De Marini 4	Palazzo Pietro Durazzo	
8	Nicolò Lomellini	Piazza della Nunziata 5	Palazzo Nicolò Lomellini	
9	Cristoforo Spinola	Piazza della Nunziata 6	Palazzo Cristoforo Spinola	
10	Bernardo e Giuseppe De Franchi	Piazza della Posta Vecchia 2	Palazzo Bernardo e Giuseppe De Franchi	
11	Agostino De Franchi	Piazza della Posta Vecchia 3	Palazzo Agostino De Franchi	
12	Domenico Grillo	Piazza delle Vigne 4	Palazzo Domenico Grillo	
13		Piazza delle Vigne 6	Palazzo Agostino Doria	
14	Pietro Spinola	Piazza di Pellicceria 3	Palazzo Pietro Spinola di San Luca	
15	Giulio Sale	Piazza Embriaci 5	Palazzo Giulio Sale	
16		Piazza Fontane Marose 1	Palazzo Spinola di Luccoli-Balestrino	
17	Marc'Antonio Giustiniani	Piazza Giustiniani 6	Palazzo Marcantonio Giustiniani	
18	Lorenzo Cattaneo	Piazza Grillo Cattaneo 1	Palazzo Lorenzo Cattaneo	
19	Lazzaro Grimaldi	Piazza Inferiore di Pellicceria 1	Palazzo Lazzaro Grimaldi	
20		Piazza Luccoli 2	Palazzo De Mari	
21		Piazza Pinelli 2	Palazzo Pinelli-Parodi	
22	Salvaghi	Piazza San Bernardo 26	Palazzo Salvaghi	
23	Paolo De Benedetti	Piazza San Donato 21	Palazzo Paolo De Benedetti	
24		Piazza San Giorgio 32	Palazzo Basadonne	
25	Giorgio Doria	Piazza San Matteo 14	Palazzo Giorgio Doria	
26	Marc'Aurelio Rebuffo	Piazza Santa Sabina 2	Palazzo Marc'Aurelio Rebuffo	
27	Antonio Sauli	Piazza Sauli 3	Palazzo Antonio Sauli	
28	Gio. Batta Senarega	Piazza Senarega 1	Palazzo Gio Batta Senarega	
29		Salita di San Matteo 19	Palazzo Doria-Danovaro	
30		Salita di Santa Caterina 1	Palazzo Spinola di Luccoli-Cervetto	
31	Luciano Spinola	Salita di Santa Caterina 2	Palazzo Luciano Spinola di Luccoli	
32		Salita di Santa Caterina 5	Palazzo Spinola-Celesia	
33	Agostino e Benedetto Viale	Salita Pollaioli 12	Palazzo Agostino e Benedetto Viale	
34		Via A. Gramsci 3	Palazzo Lomellini-Serra	
35		Via al Ponte Calvi 3	Palazzo Pallavicini-Fabiani	
36		Via al Ponte Reale 1	Palazzo Adorno	
37	Gio. Andrea Cicala	Via Canneto il Lungo 17	Palazzo Gio Andrea Cicala	
38	Agostino Calvi Saluzzo	Via Canneto il Lungo 21	Palazzo Agostino Calvi Saluzzo	
39		Via Canneto il Lungo 27	Palazzo Fieschi-Crosa di Vergagni	
40		Via Canneto il Lungo 6	Palazzo De Franchi-Pittaluga	
41	Gio. Battista Saluzzo	Via Chiabrera 7	Palazzo Gio Battista Saluzzo	
42		Via David Chiossone 14	Palazzo Doria-Serra	
43		Via David Chiossone 4	Palazzo Grimaldi	
44		Via degli Orefici 7	Palazzo Lercari-Spinola	
45	Vincenzo Giustiniani Banca	Via dei Giustiniani 11	Palazzo Vincenzo Giustiniani Banca	
46	Gaspare Basadonne	Via dei Giustiniani 3	Palazzo Gaspare Basadonne	
47	Bartolomeo Invrea	Via del Campo 10	Palazzo Bartolomeo Invrea	
48		Via del Campo 12	Palazzo Durazzo-Cattaneo Adorno	
49	Antonio Doria Invrea	Via del Campo 9	Palazzo Antonio Doria Invrea	
50	Francesco Borsotto	Via della Maddalena 29	Palazzo Francesco Borsotto	
51	Jacopo Spinola	Via della Posta Vecchia 16	Palazzo Jacopo Spinola	
52		Via Luccoli 22	Palazzo Tommaso Franzone	
53	Daniele Spinola	Via Luccoli 23	Palazzo Nicolò Spinola di Luccoli	
54	Filippo Lomellini	Via Paolo Emilio Bensa 1	Palazzo Filippo Lomellini	
55	Marc'Antonio Sauli	Via San Bernardo 19	Palazzo Marcantonio Sauli	
56		Via San Bernardo 21	Palazzo Alessandro Giustiniani	
57	Bendinelli Sauli	Via San Lorenzo 12	Palazzo Bendinelli Sauli	
58	Sinibaldo Fieschi	Via San Lorenzo 17	Palazzo Sinibaldo Fieschi	
59	Orazio e G. Fran.co De Franceschi	Via San Lorenzo 19	Palazzo Orazio e Gio Francesco De Franceschi	
60	Giovanni Battista Centurione	Via San Lorenzo 5	Palazzo Centurione-Gavotti	
61		Via San Lorenzo 8	Palazzo Durazzo-Zoagli	
62		Via San Luca 4	Palazzo Spinola di San Luca-Gentile	
63		Via San Luca 6	Palazzo Spinola di San Luca	
64	Gerolamo Pallavicini	Via XXV Aprile 12	Palazzo Gerolamo Pallavicini	
65	Giovanni Garibaldi	Vico Carmagnola 7	Palazzo Giovanni Garibaldi	
66		Vico dei Ragazzi 6	Palazzo Sauli	
67		Vico del Fieno 2	Palazzo Chiavari-Calcagno	
68	Brancaleone Grillo	Vico Delle Mele 6	Palazzo Brancaleone Grillo	
69		Vico Falamonica 1	Palazzo Doria-Centurione	
70	Nicola Grimaldi	Vico San Luca 2	Palazzo Nicola Grimaldi	
71		Vico Scuole Pie 1	Palazzo Cicala-Raggio	
72		Via Lomellini 15	Palazzo Lomellini-Dodero	

== Rolli Days ==
In 2009, after the Palazzi dei Rolli were recognized as a UNESCO World Heritage Site, the Municipality of Genoa started the so-called Rolli Days, dedicated to the free visit of both public and private buildings. Each time a different itinerary is proposed, with art students, architects and professional guides offering guided tours, almost all of them for free.

The Rolli Days happen twice a year, normally during a weekend in May and one in September. An exception to this rule was made to mark the tenth anniversary of UNESCO's recognition in 2016, when three weekends were dedicated to the Rolli Days in April, May and October.

The number of notable buildings open to the public during the Rolli Days has been increasing over time. More recently, also palaces not originally belonging to the Rolli system (as an example, some historical buildings of the University of Genoa), suburban villas and churches have been added to the tour offerings.

== Palazzo Grillo seat of the De André Foundation ==
One of the Rolli palaces - Palazzo Grillo in Piazza delle Vigne - was intended by the property to host the Foundation named after Fabrizio De André, famous songwriter from Genoa. Given the time required for the restoration of the building, the inauguration of the facility is scheduled for 2019, the tenth anniversary of his death in 2009.

Inside the home, located in the centre of Genoa, will be a café and / or a restaurant, an auditorium, public rooms (classrooms and information) devoted to the study of the Genoese school of singer-songwriters, the top floor of the residence could be a meeting place between guests.

FAI is in the process of completing the rehabilitation and restoration of Villa Saluzzo Bombrini, in the Albaro quarter, known as Il Paradiso and inhabited in his youth by De André.

== Images ==
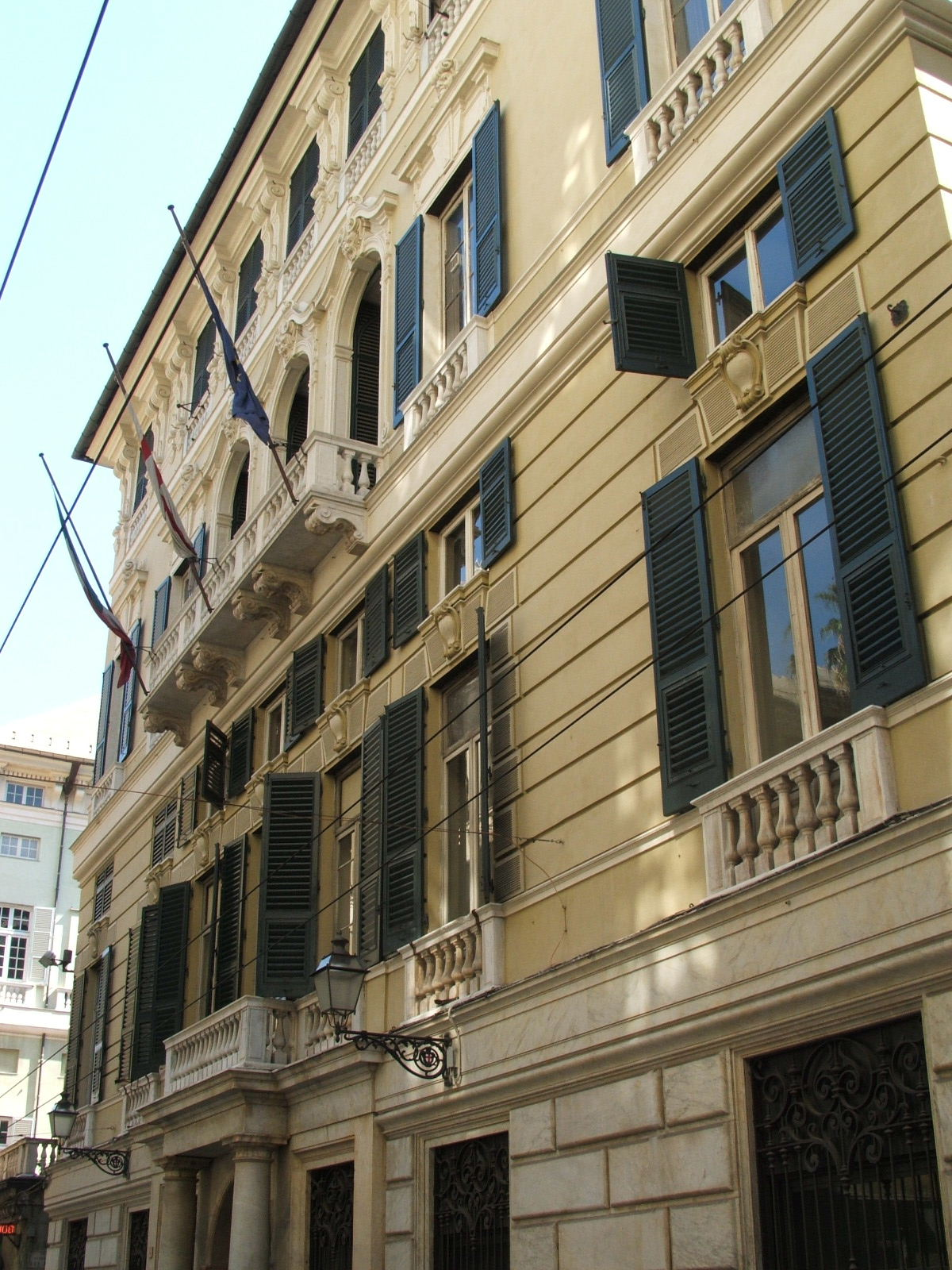
Palazzo Balbi Piovera Raggio (via Baldi)

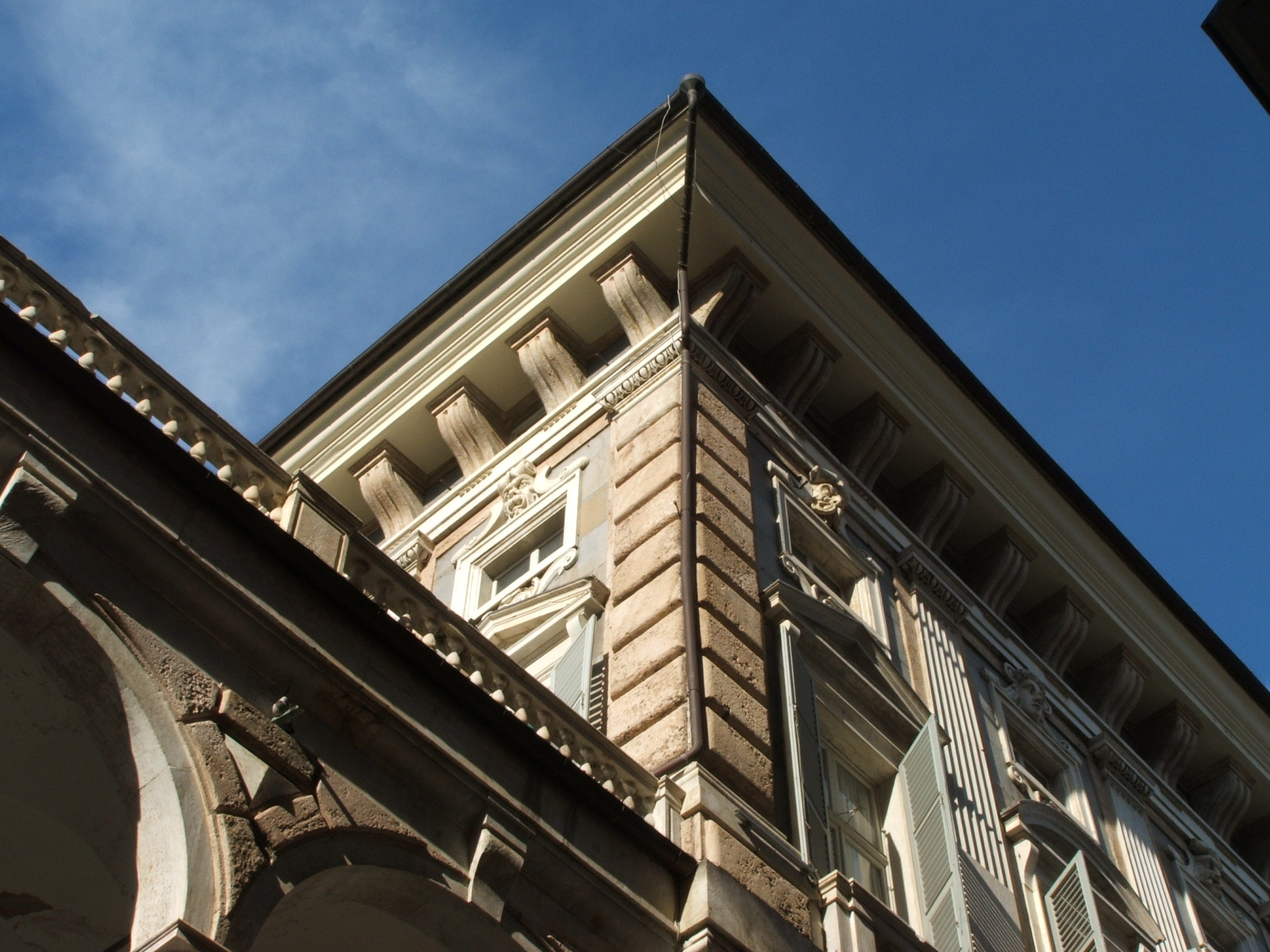
via Garibaldi, Genoa

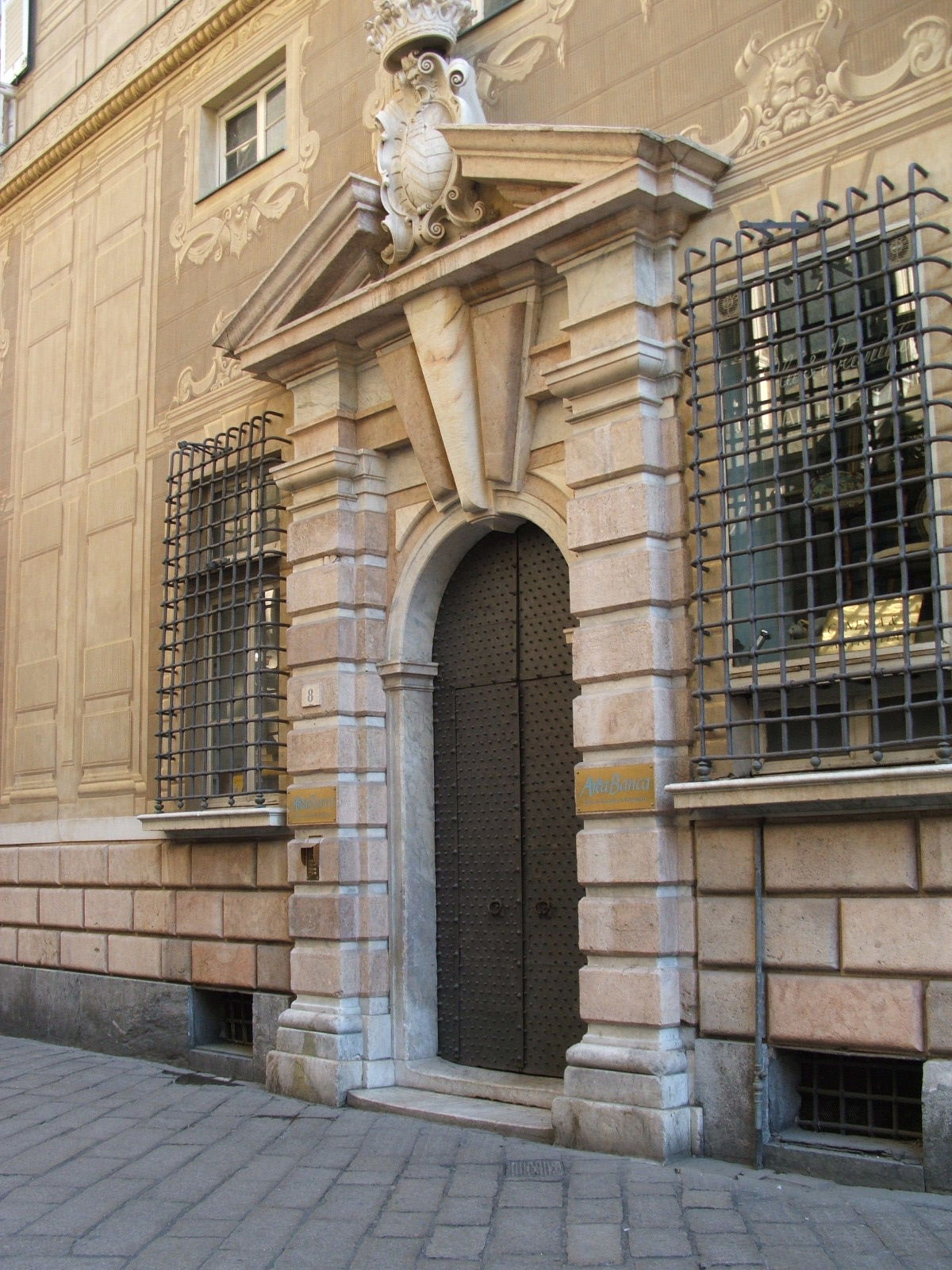
via Garibaldi, Genoa

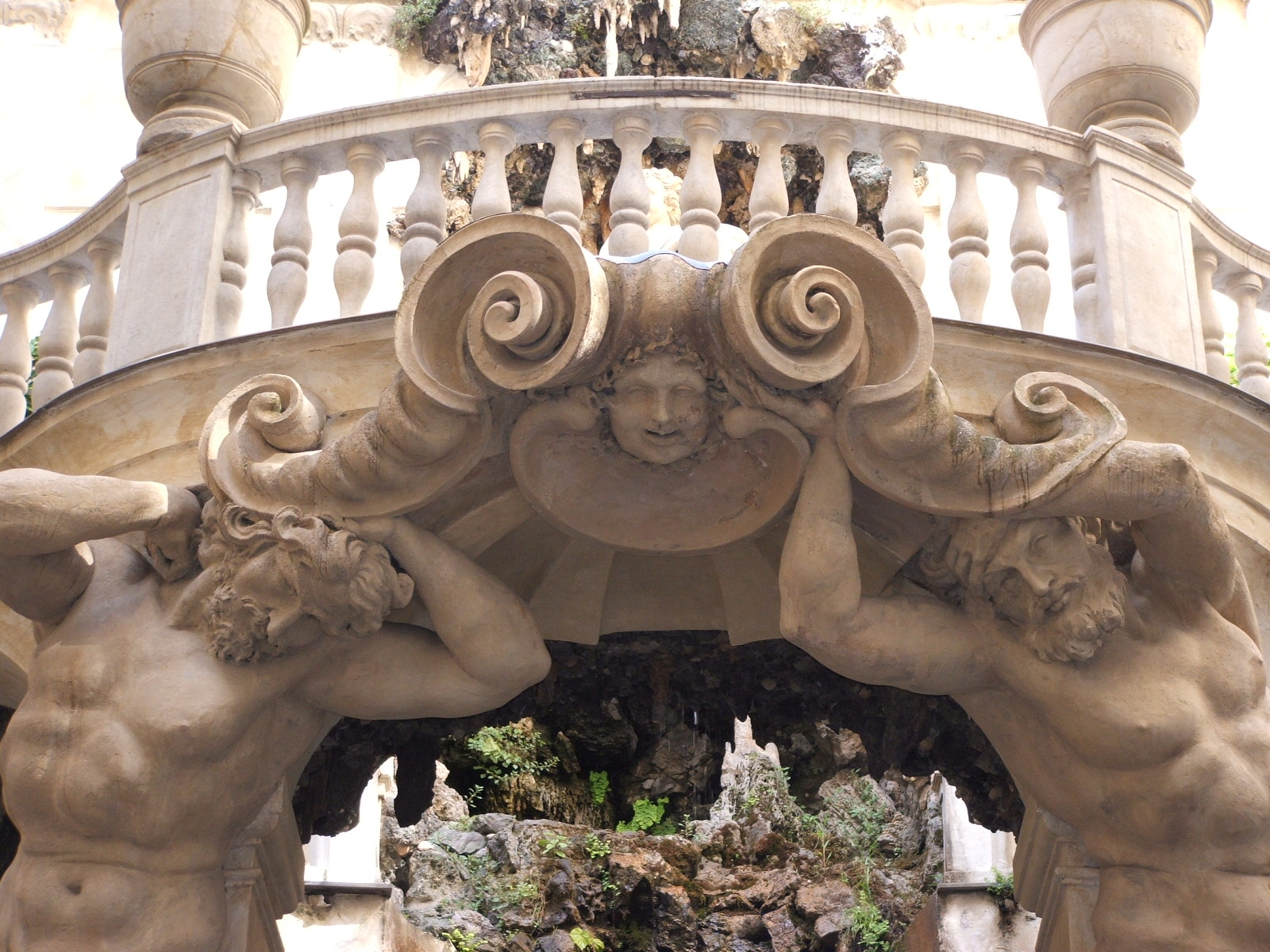
Garden with statues and ninfeo Palazzo Podestà

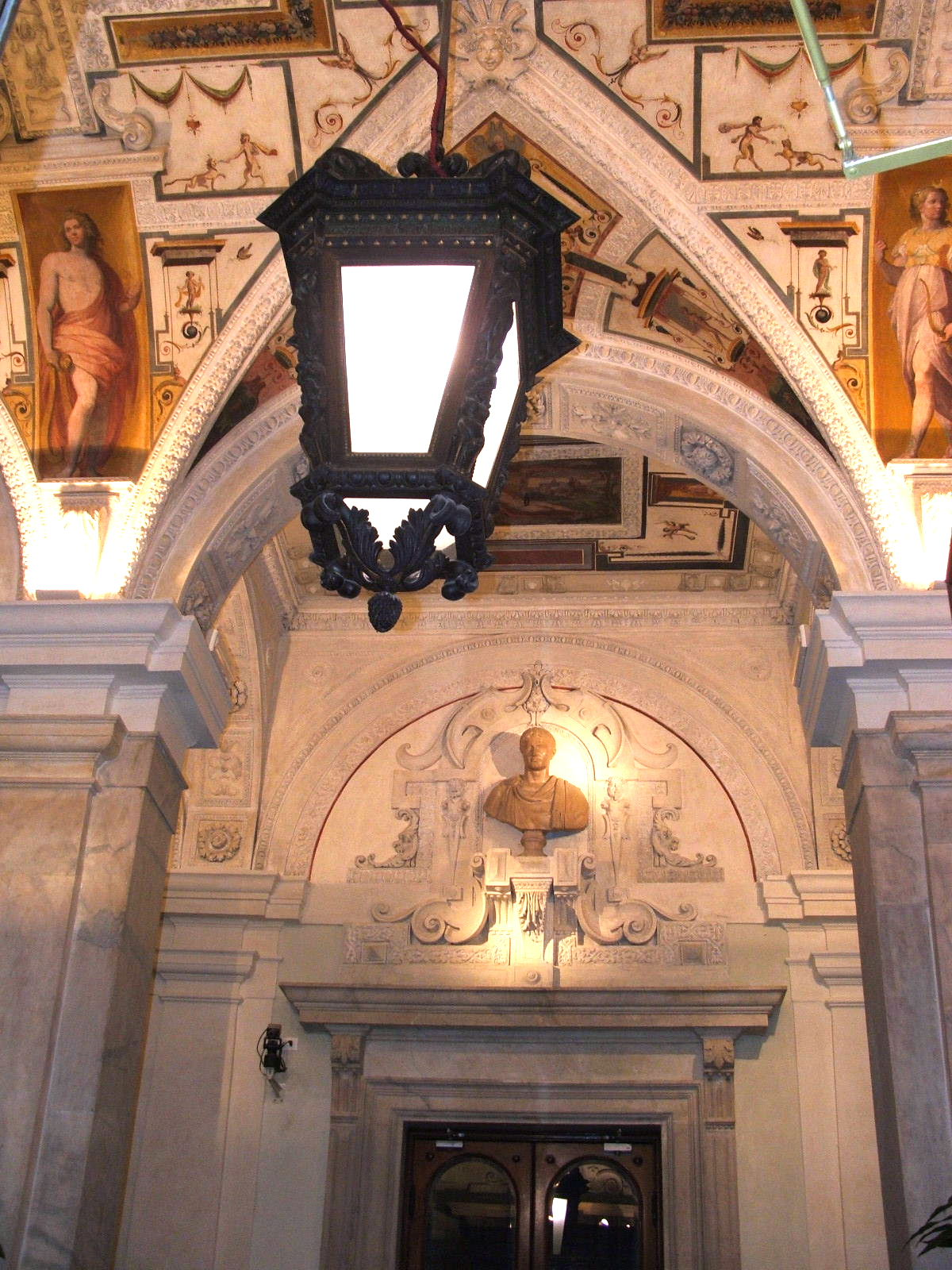
Hall of the Palazzo Carrega Cataldi, Via Garibaldi, Genoa

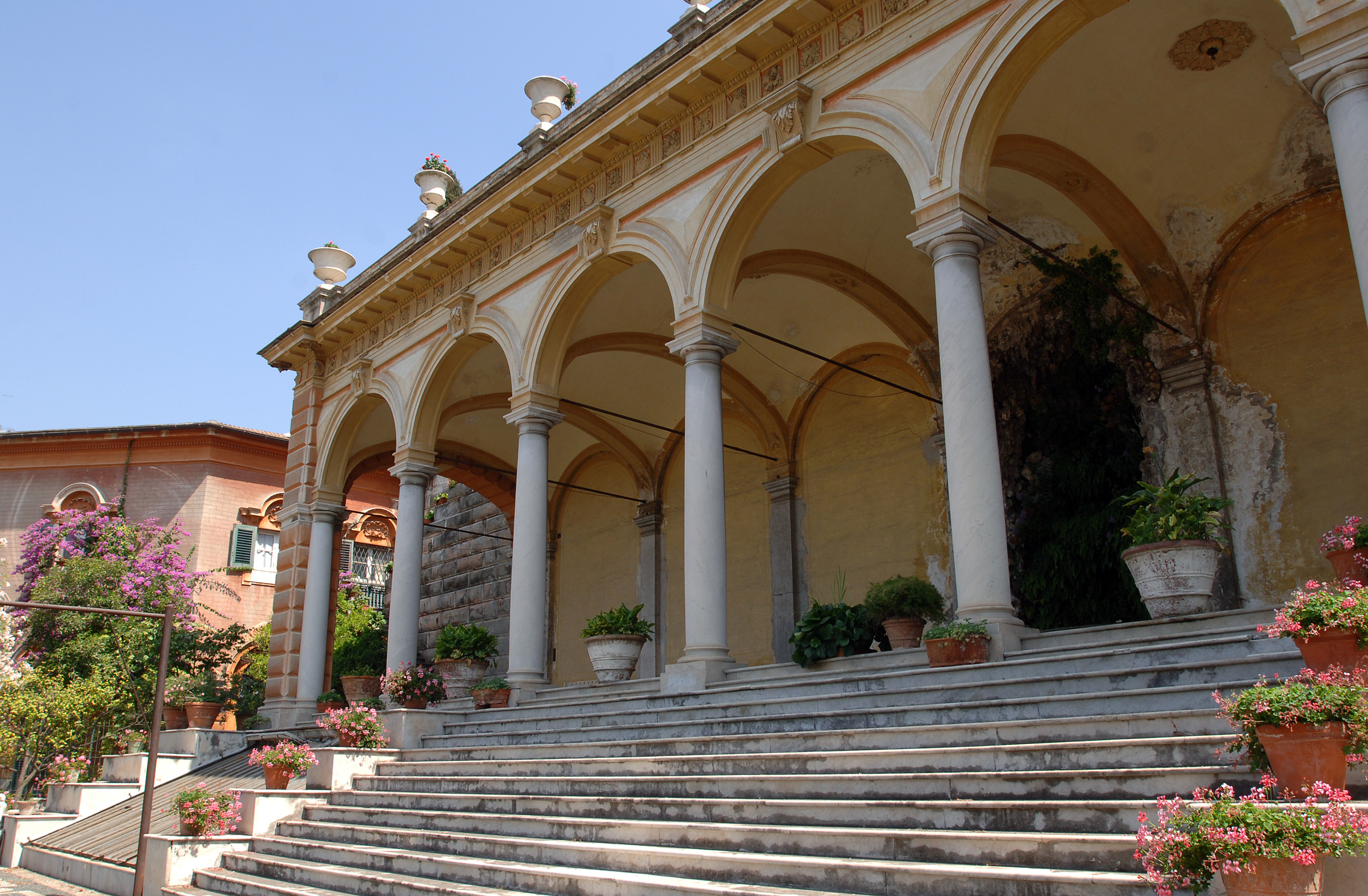

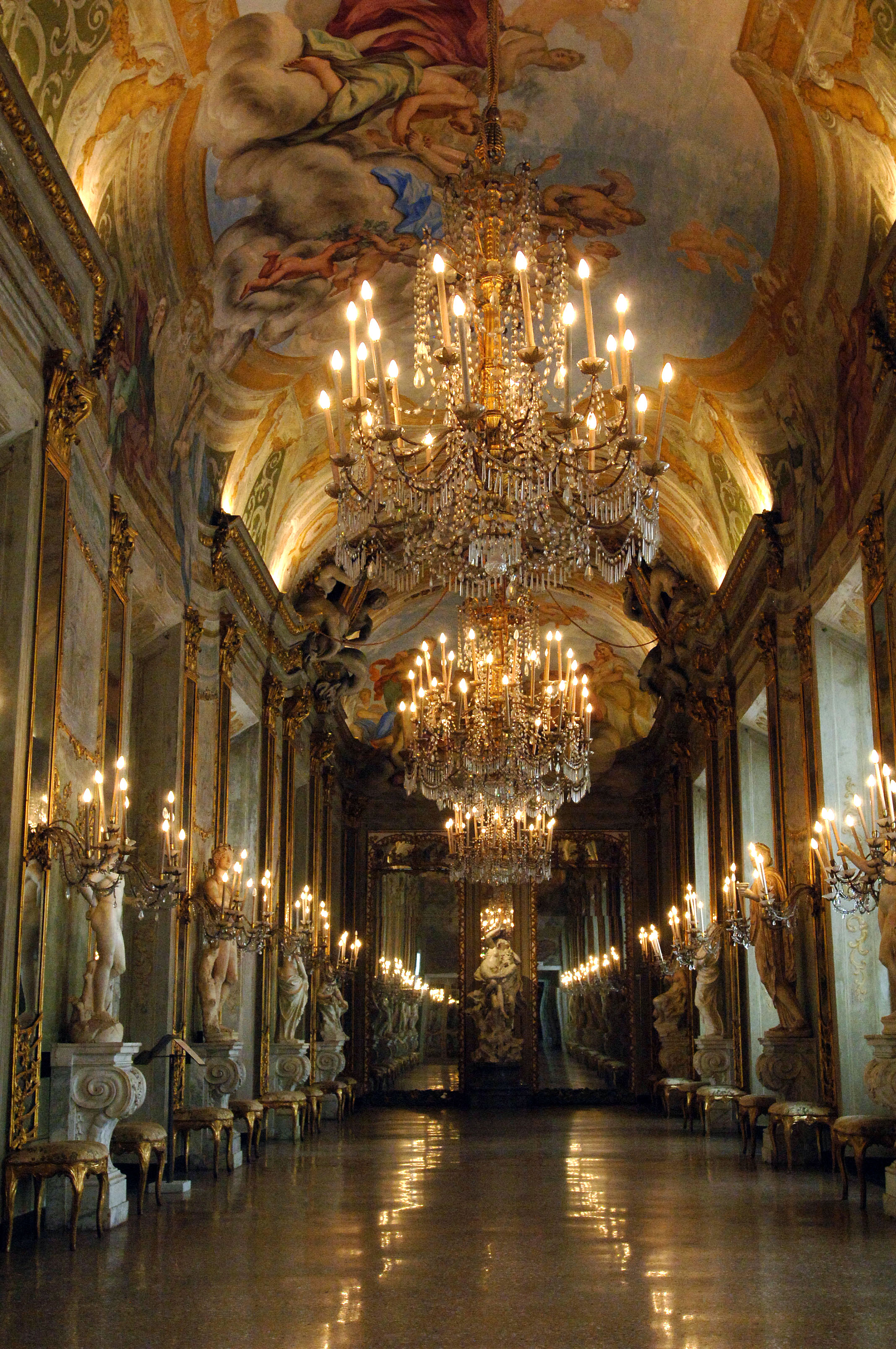
Mirror gallery in the Royal Palace, via Balbi, Genoa

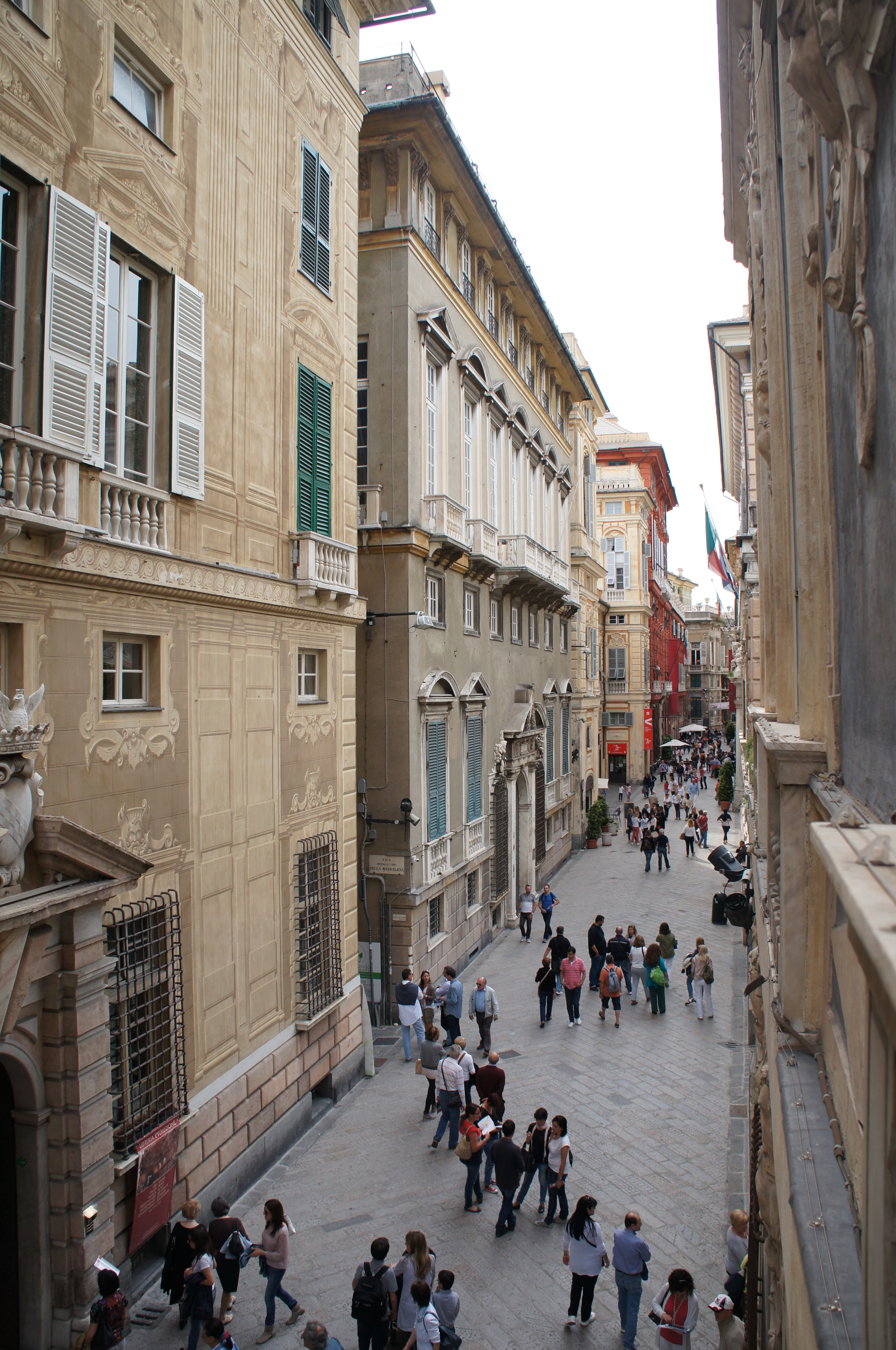
via Garibaldi, Genoa

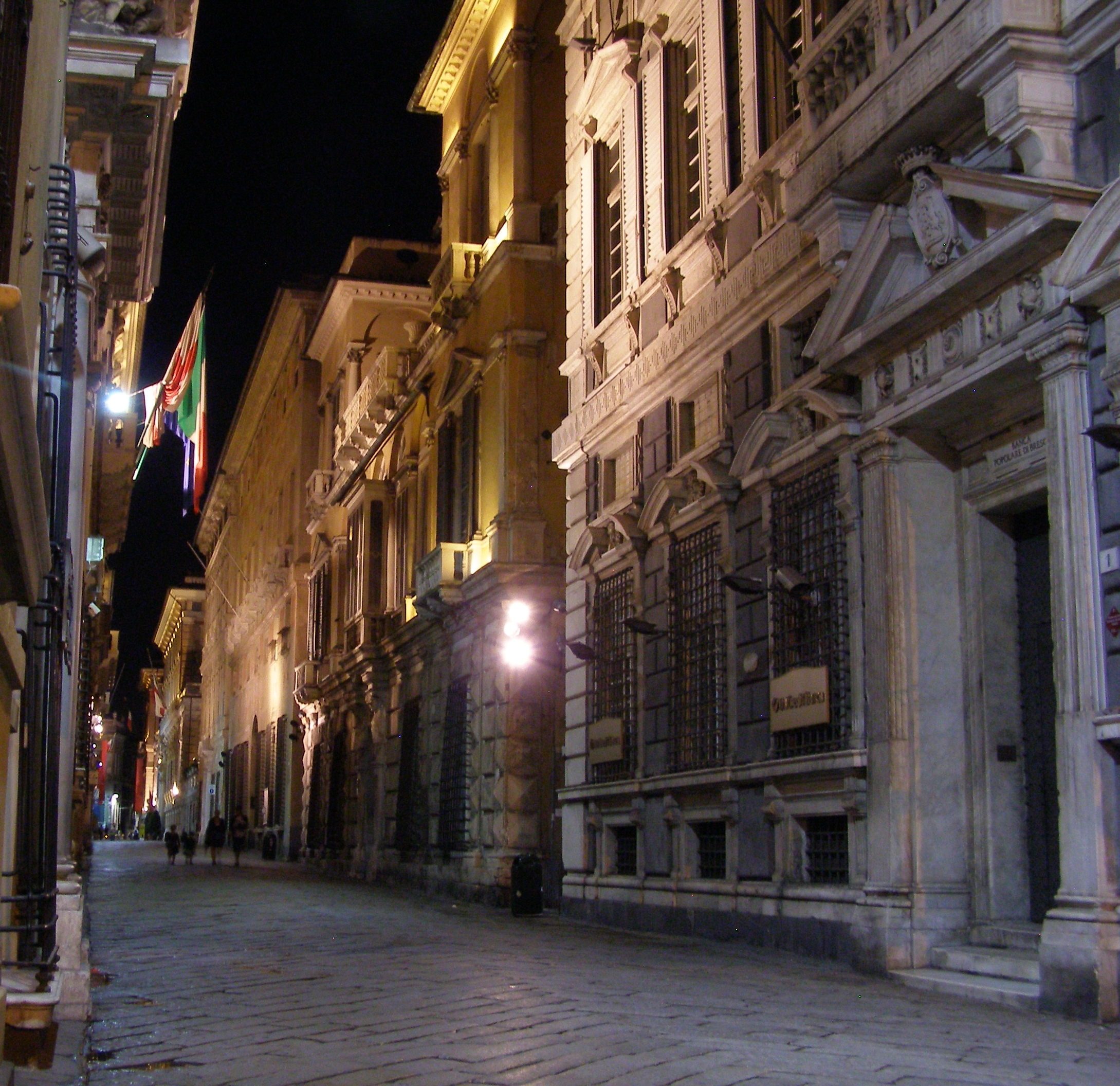
via Garibaldi, Genoa

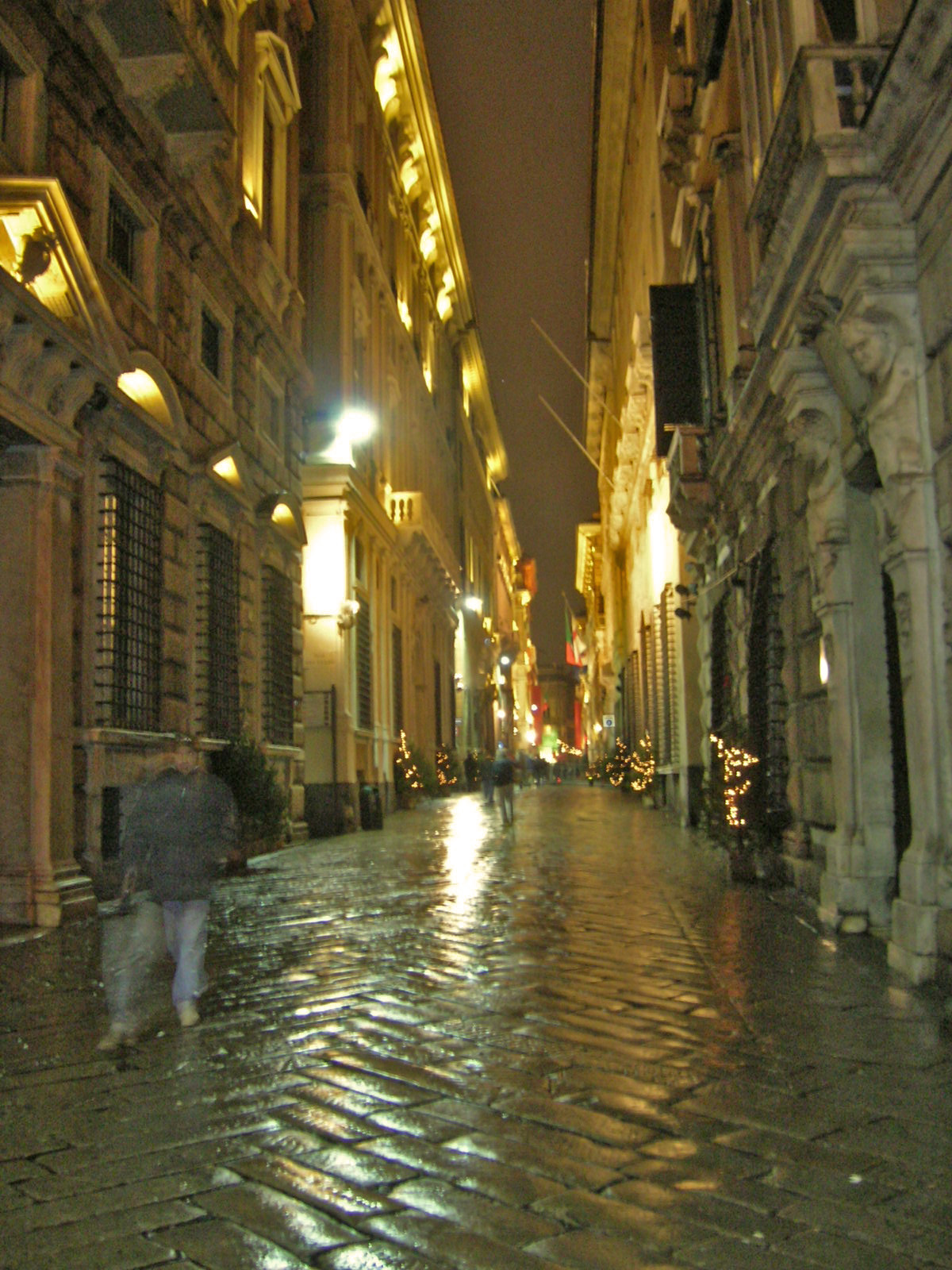

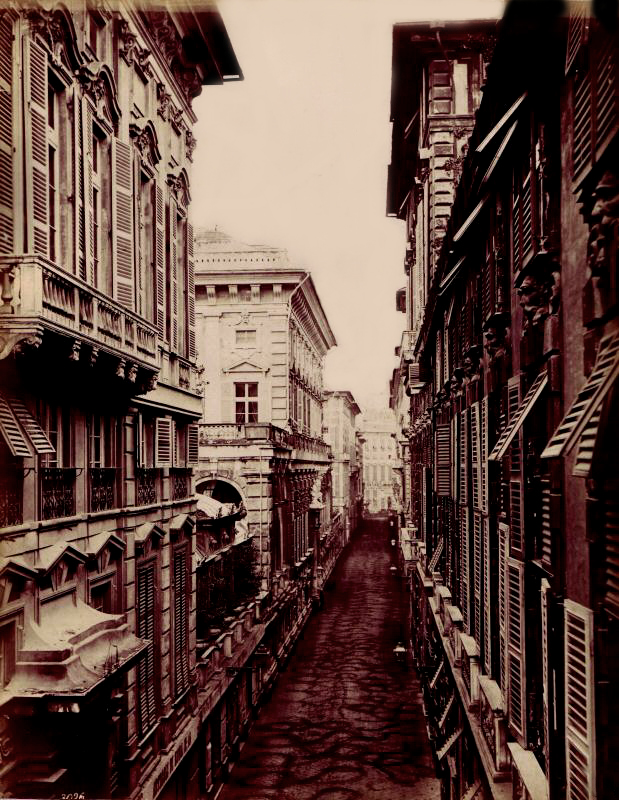
via Garibaldi, Genoa

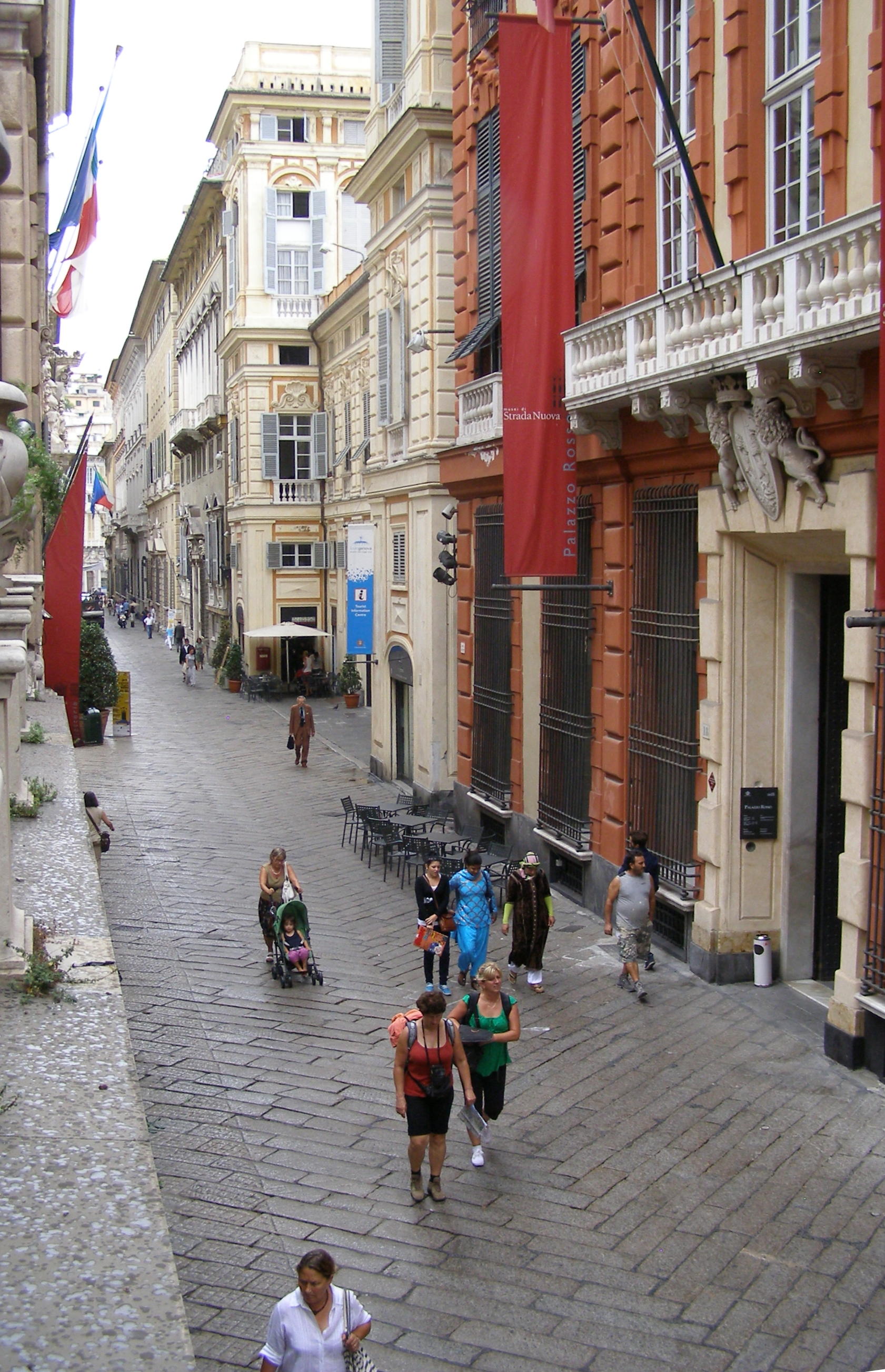
via Garibaldi, Genoa

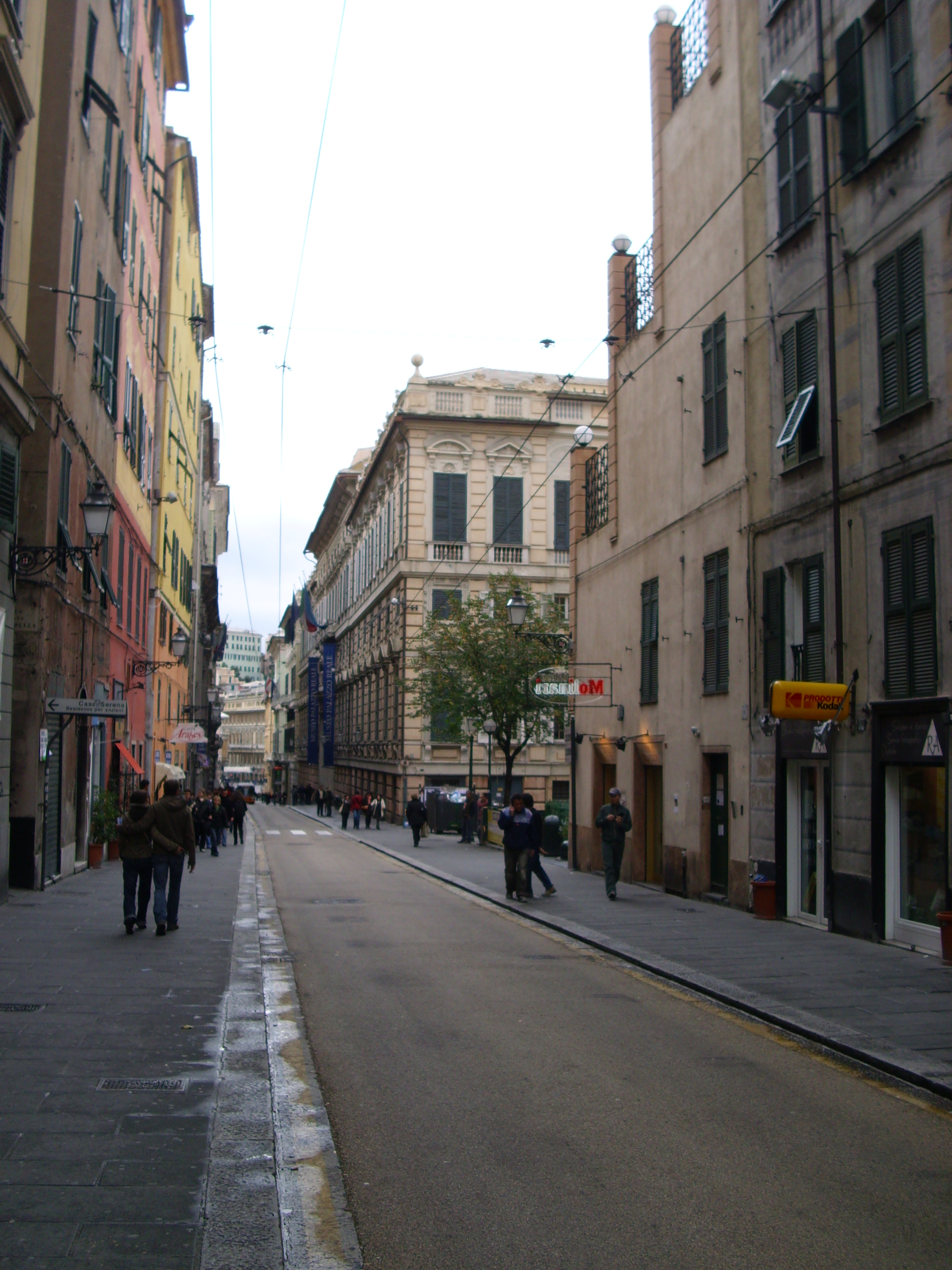
via Balbi, Genoa

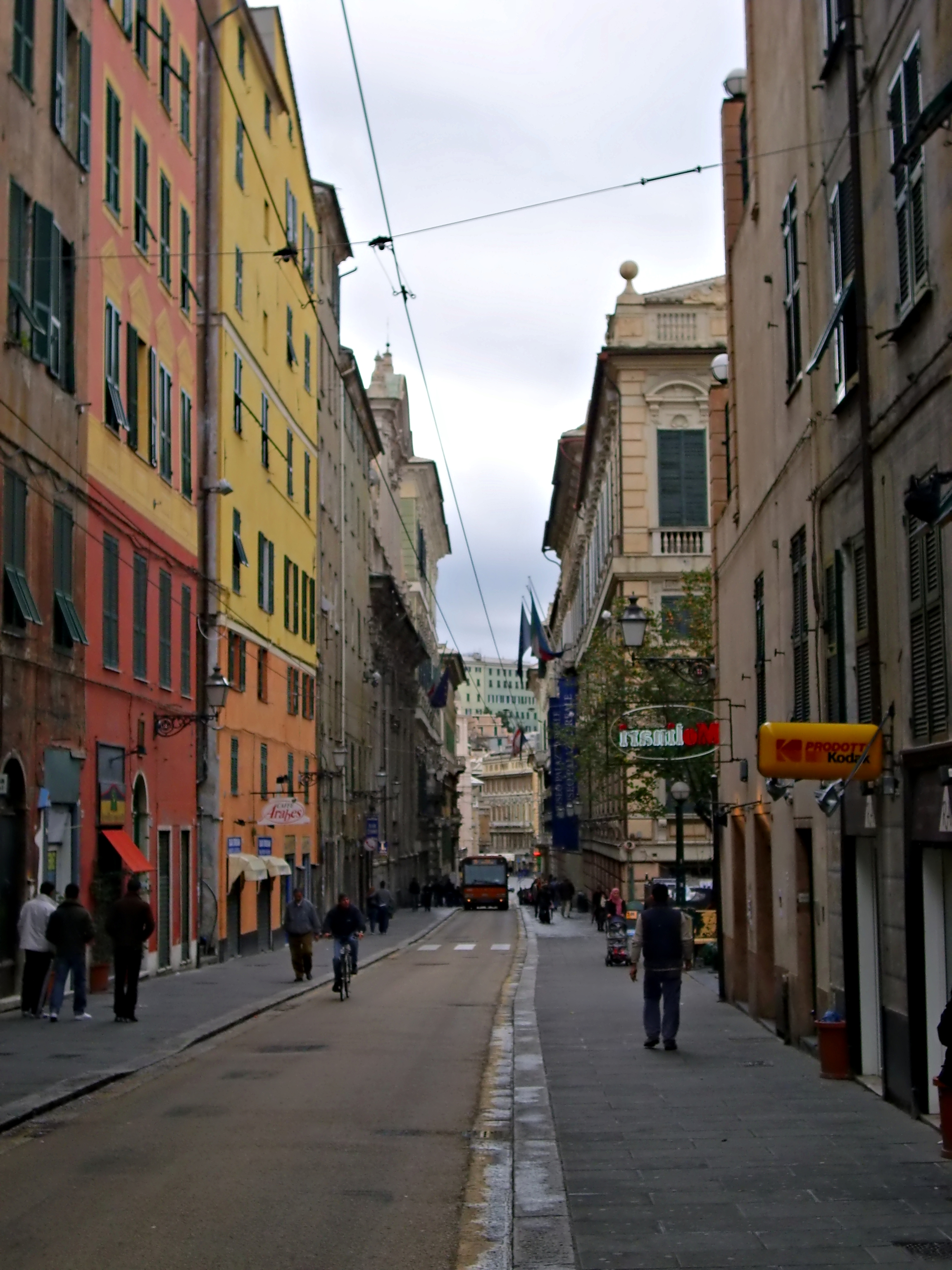
via Balbi, Genoa

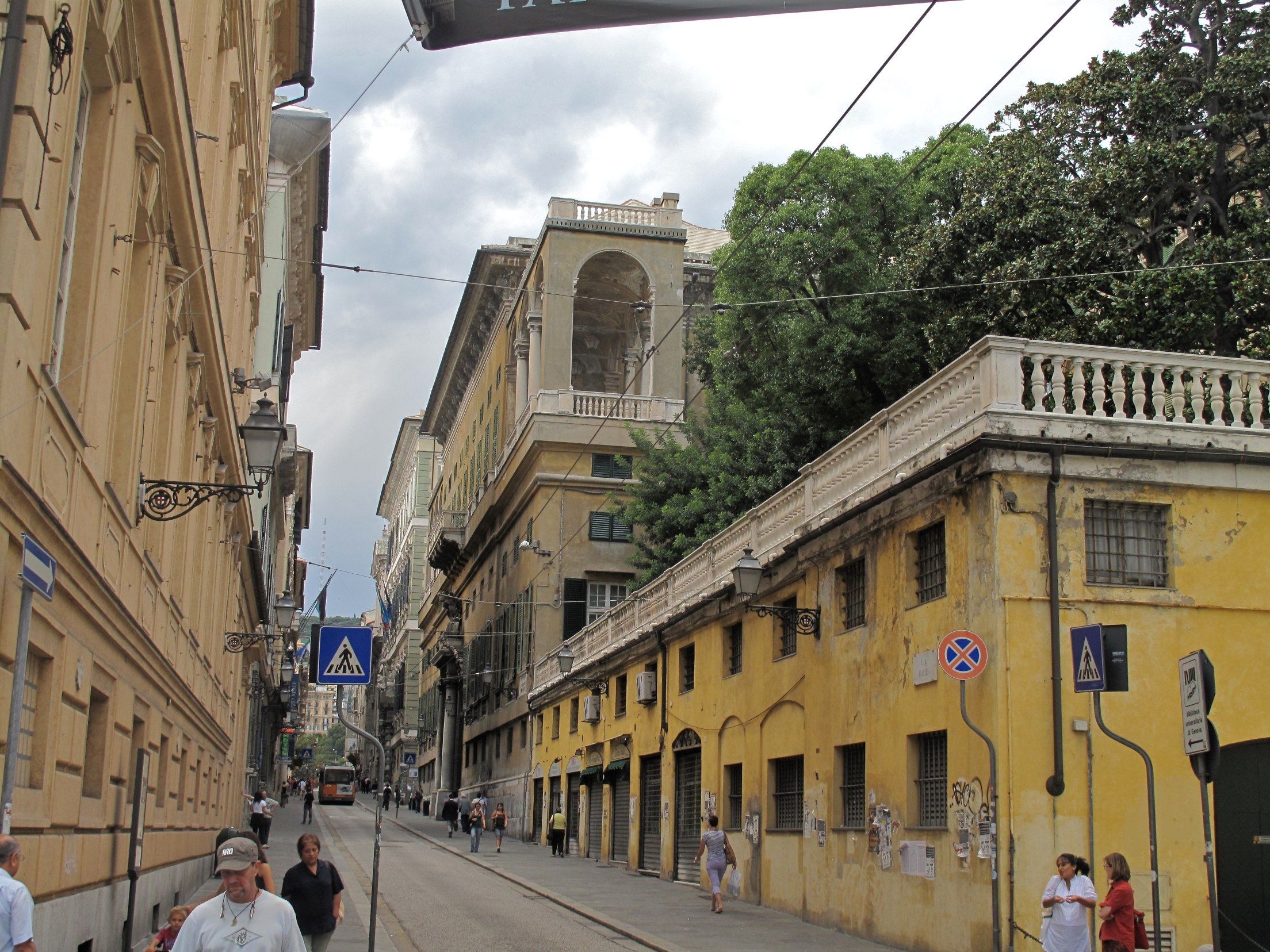
via Balbi, Genoa

== See also ==
- Via Garibaldi
- Via Cairoli
- Via Balbi
- Republic of Genoa
- Genoa

== Bibliography ==
- Fiorella Caraceni (1992), Una strada rinascimentale: via Garibaldi a Genova, Genova, SAGEP
- Giorgio Doria (1995), Nobiltà e investimenti a Genova in Età moderna, Genova
- Gioconda Pomella (2007), Guida Completa ai Palazzi dei Rolli Genova, Genova, De Ferrari Editore(ISBN 9788871728155)
- Mauro Quercioli (2008), I Palazzi dei Rolli di Genova, Roma, Libreria dello Stato (ISBN 9788824011433)
- Fiorella Caraceni Poleggi (2001), Palazzi Antichi e Moderni di Genova raccolti e disegnati da Pietro Paolo Rubens (1652), Genova, Tormena Editore (ISBN 9788884801302)
- Mario Labò (2003), I palazzi di Genova di P.P. Rubens, Genova, Nuova Editrice Genovese
