= Palazzo Cristoforo Spinola =

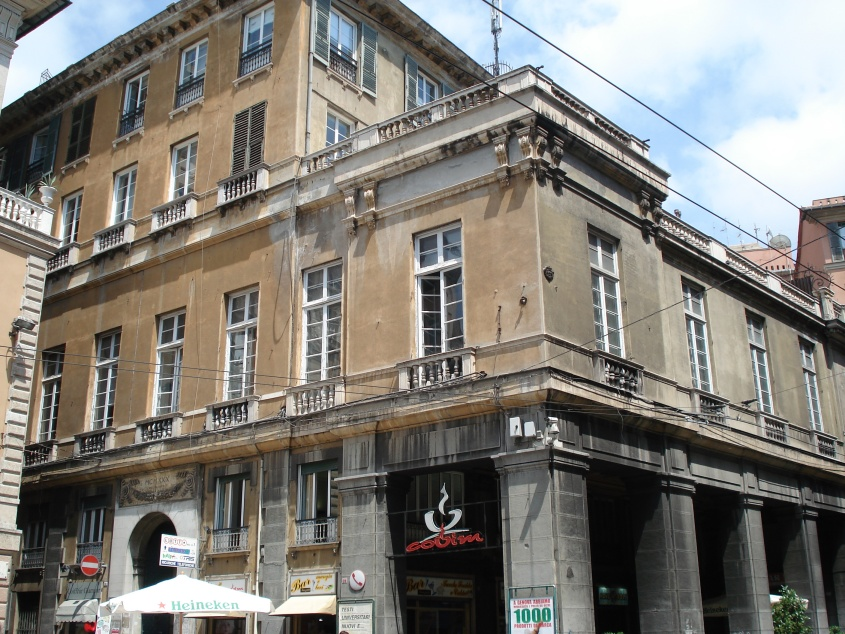
- Facade of the Palazzo Palazzo Cristoforo Spinola in Piazza della Nunziata 6
- Interactive map of the Palazzo Cristoforo Spinola area

General information
- Status: In use
- Type: Palace
- Architectural style: Mannerist
- Location: Genoa, Italy, 6, Piazza della Nunziata
- Coordinates: 44.413756°N 8.928881°E
- Current tenants: offices
- Construction started: 16th century
- Completed: 16th century

The Palazzo Cristoforo Spinola is a building located in Piazza della Nunziata at number 6 in the historical centre of Genoa. The building was included, and still is, in the list of palaces inscribed in the Rolli di Genova.

== History and description ==
Originally owned by Cristoforo Spinola, the palace owes its fame to Tomaso Pallavicini who rebuilt it almost entirely between 1620 and 1621.

Located in the area of the 'Guastato' until a few years before the boundary of the 'planned' expansion, the building already enjoyed an enviable position at that time, being at a strategic crossroads for the new internal connections (via Balbi - largo della Zecca).

The palace, already since 1614 a meeting place for the governors of the Pallavicini family, has undergone alterations over the last three centuries that make the rubensiana edition plan unrecognisable: the general layout remains of this one (low body of the terrace at the level of the second piano nobile and lateral placement of the staircase). The monochrome façade has erased the ancient fresco decorations made between 1837 and 1838.

In the first half of the 20th century the building was the subject, together with Palazzo Filippo Lomellini, of new interventions determined by the changed road system introduced in the area: the present forepart of Palazzo Filippo Lomellini, also overlooking Via Bensa, was built, and the forepart of Palazzo Cristoforo Spinola, overlooking the same street, was built in 1930 a new public pedestrian portico, which also still exists today.

It became property from 1880, until 2007, of the Acquedotto De Ferrari Galliera (now Mediterranea delle Acque SpA), and from 2007 to 2015 of the company Fabrica Immobiliare Sgr SpA, part of the Caltagirone/Monte Paschi group, since the last extraordinary building works, dating back to the first half of the 20th century, the building has not undergone any noteworthy renovations until 2015; from the point of view of systems, in that interval, the historical wooden lift (replaced in 2016), and the telematic data network system (still in use), built by the University of Genoa (the building's tenant) in the early 1990s, are worth mentioning.

In 2015 the building was purchased, through the company Editio Srl, by the Savigliano publisher Nino Aragno, which proceeded to revalue the building thanks to some building and plant works, started in 2016 and completed in 2017, consisting in the remaking of the monochrome façade and related decorations, of the plaster and related decorations of the staircase and atrium, and in the replacement of the historic wooden lift with a new modern system, which was also brought down to the ground floor, with access a few metres to the left of the main door (Vico della Fortuna 3), to allow disabled students access to the building's offices (previously provided by the entrance to the neighbouring Palazzo Filippo Lomellini, which the university was the tenant of until the end of 2016).
