= Palazzo Mastelli del Cammello =

Palace in Venice, Italy

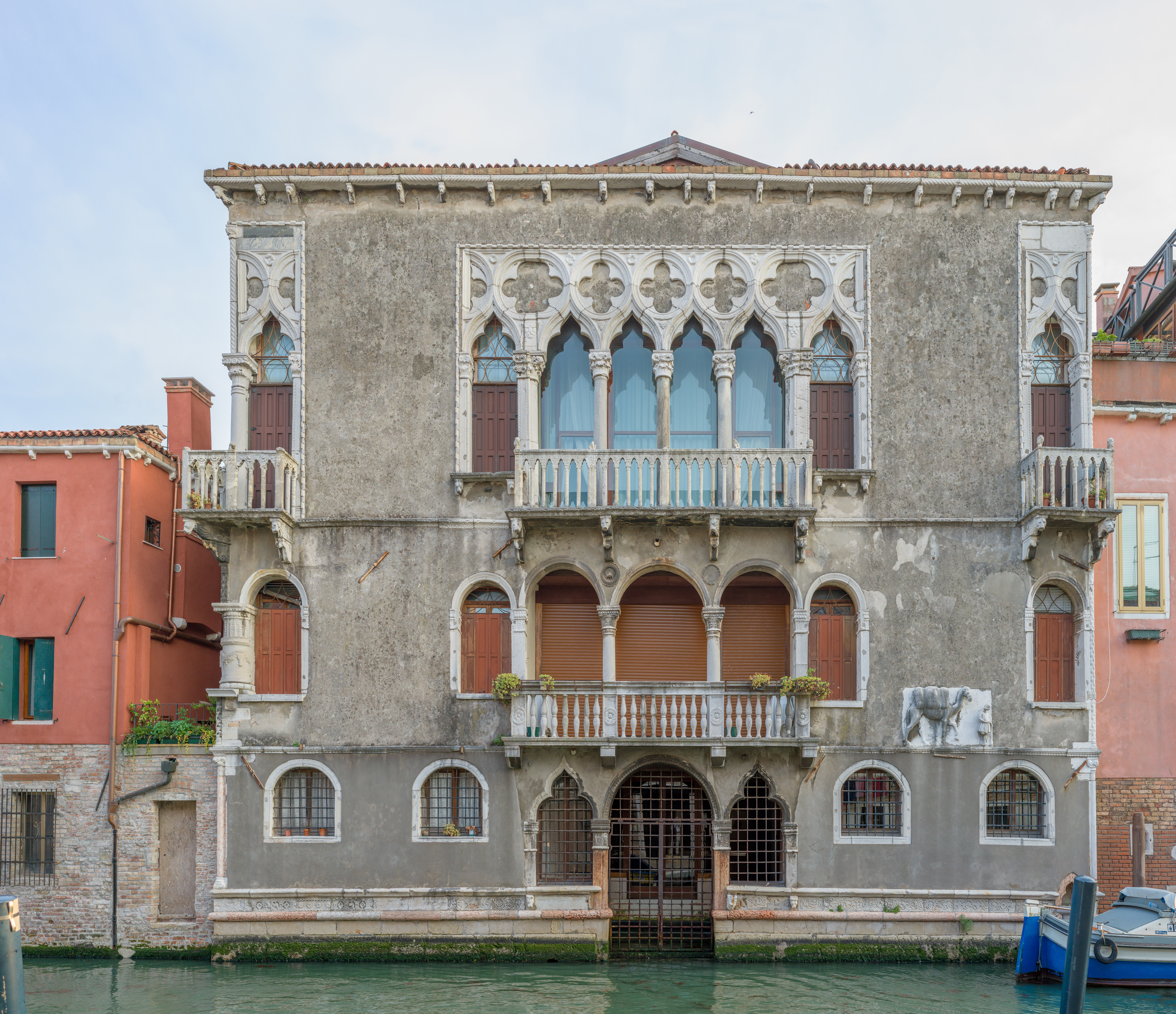
- Palazzo Mastelli del Cammello
- Interactive map of the Palazzo Mastelli del Cammello area

General information
- Type: Residential
- Architectural style: Gothic
- Location: Cannaregio district, Venice, Italy
- Coordinates: 45°26′46″N 12°19′56″E
- Construction started: 12th century
- Construction stopped: 14th century

Technical details
- Floor count: 3 levels

Palazzo Mastelli del Cammello is a Gothic palace in Venice, Italy. It is located in Cannaregio district, on the Campo dei Mori and the Rio Madonna dell'Orto.

== History ==
The building formerly belonged to three silk and spices merchant brothers (Rioba, Sandi, and Afani), who relocated from the Peloponnese to Venice around 1112 and then adopted the name Mastelli. They are traditionally associated with four statues of the three Moors and their servant on the Campo dei Mori. The initial construction of the palace dates back to the 12th century.

== Architecture ==
The palazzo facade has three levels and is covered with gray stucco. The ground floor has a water portal flanked by lancet and arched windows. At the bottom right, there is a small fountain made in Arabian style, that, until a few years ago, was used to drink water while staying on the boat or gondola. The first noble floor has a trifora flanked by pairs of side windows. On its right side, the level is decorated with a bas-relief representing a turbaned man pulling a laden camel. It is this sculpture that gives its name del cammello to the palace. The level also has two paterae, one of them depicting a peacock. The left side window has a bit of Roman altar serving as a thick corner column. The second noble floor has a Gothic hexafora supported by a balcony on corbels and flanked by single-light side openings, also with balconies. The left balcony goes around the corner of the building. Quatrefoils, two of them irregular, decorate the top part of the hexafora.

The cornice is supported by small dentils decorated with animal heads. In the middle part of the roof there is a large dormer window. The windows, door frames, balconies, corbels, balusters, cornice, quatrefoils, and the relief of the camel are made of Istrian stone.

== Gallery ==
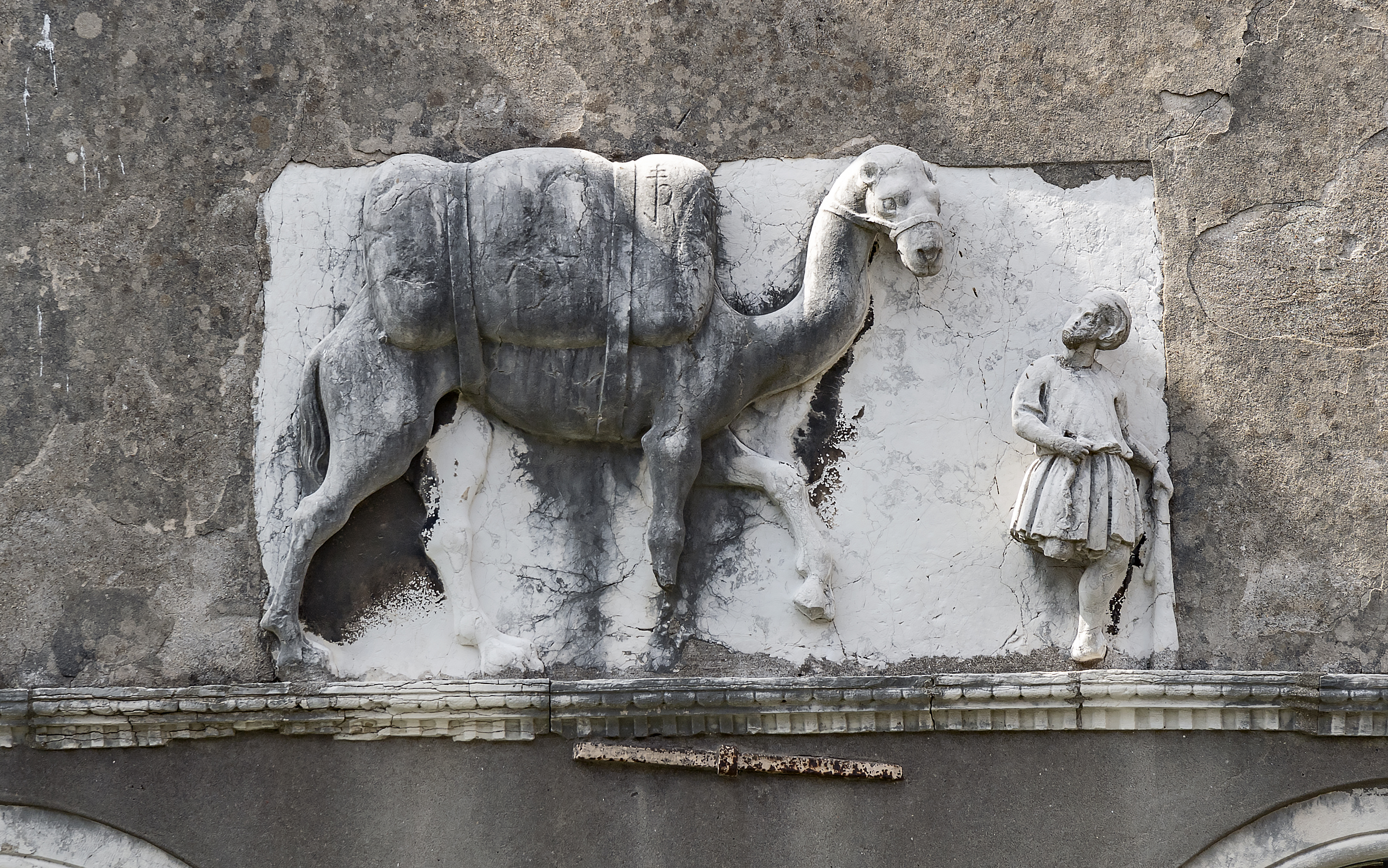
Sculpture of the camel that gave its name to the palace.

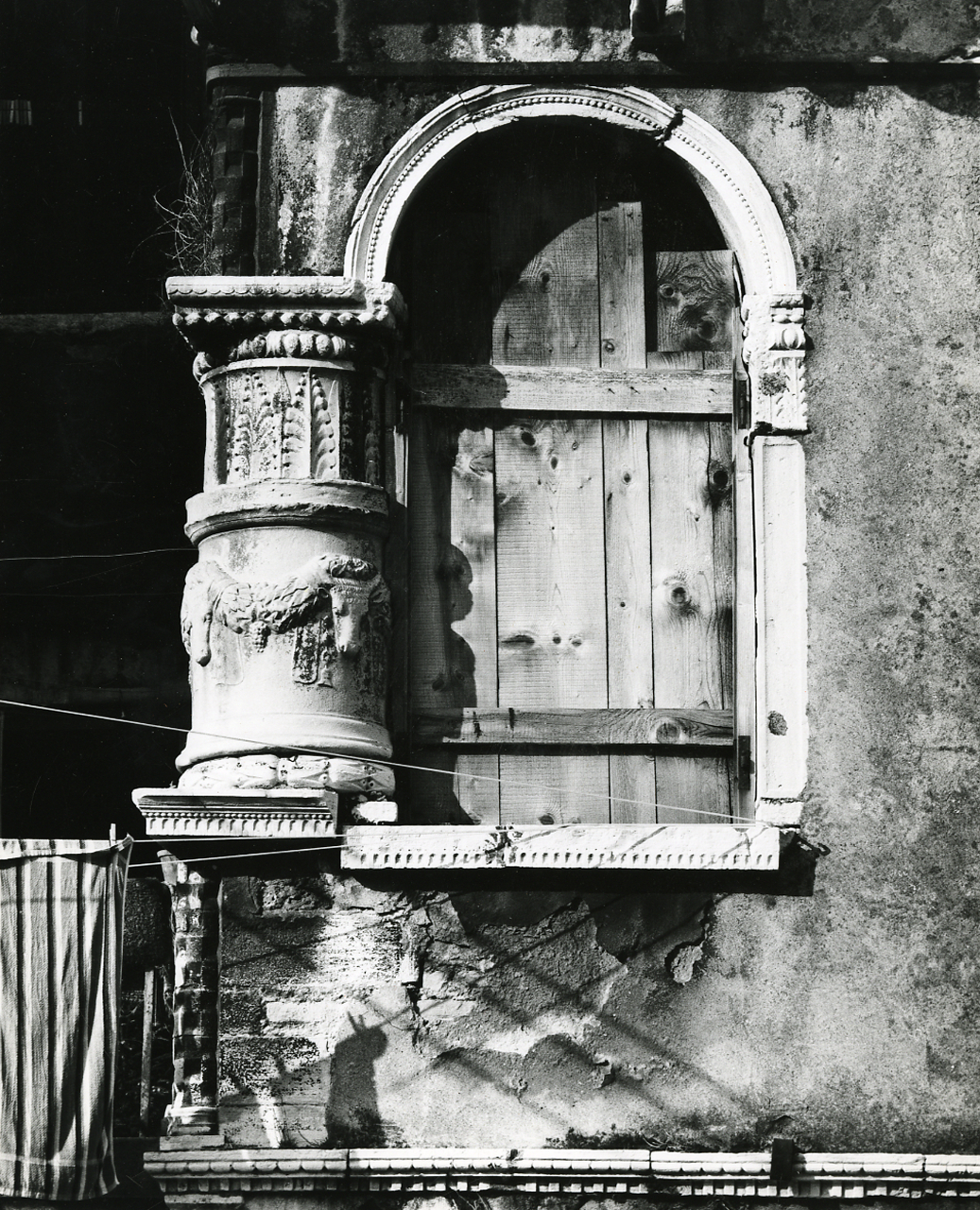
Side window of the first noble floor, photo by Paolo Monti

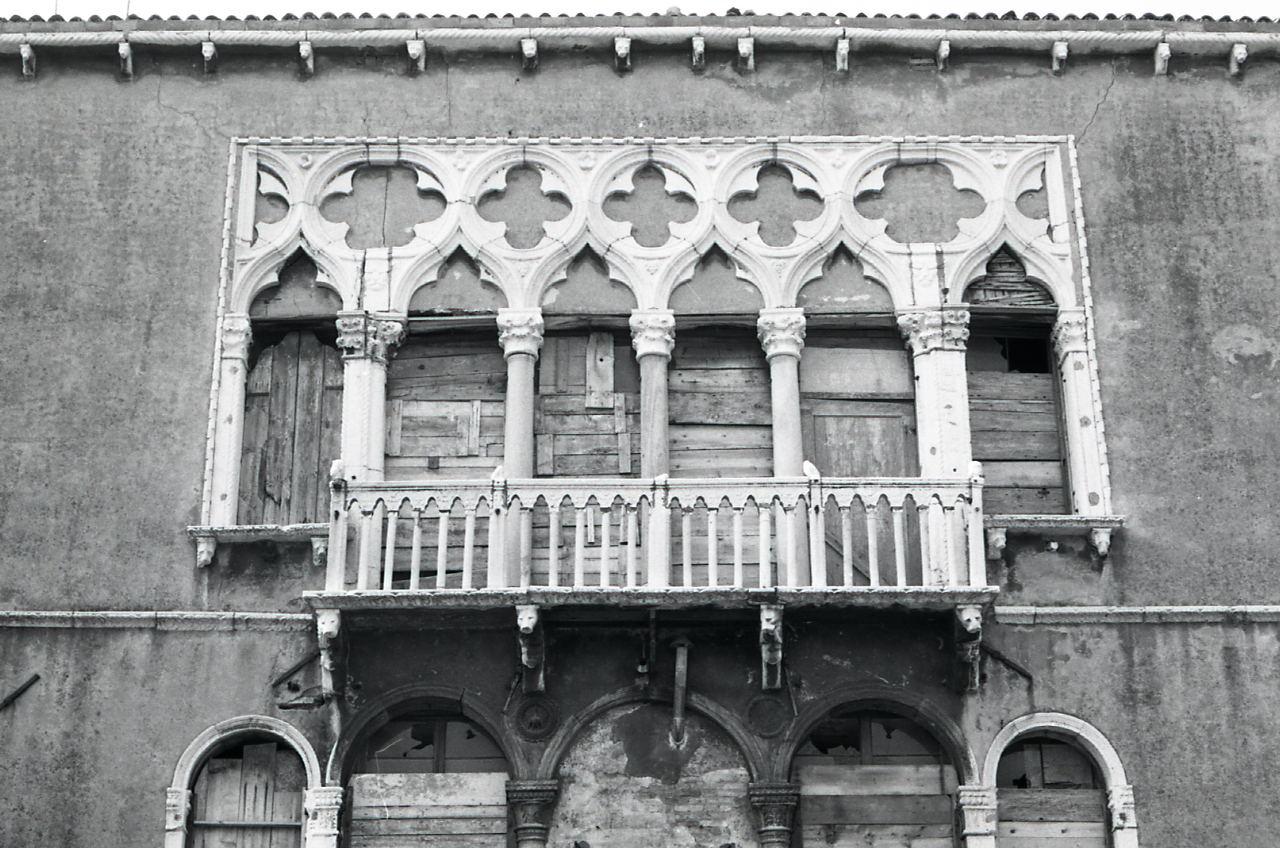
Quatrefoiled hexafora on the top floor, photo by Paolo Monti

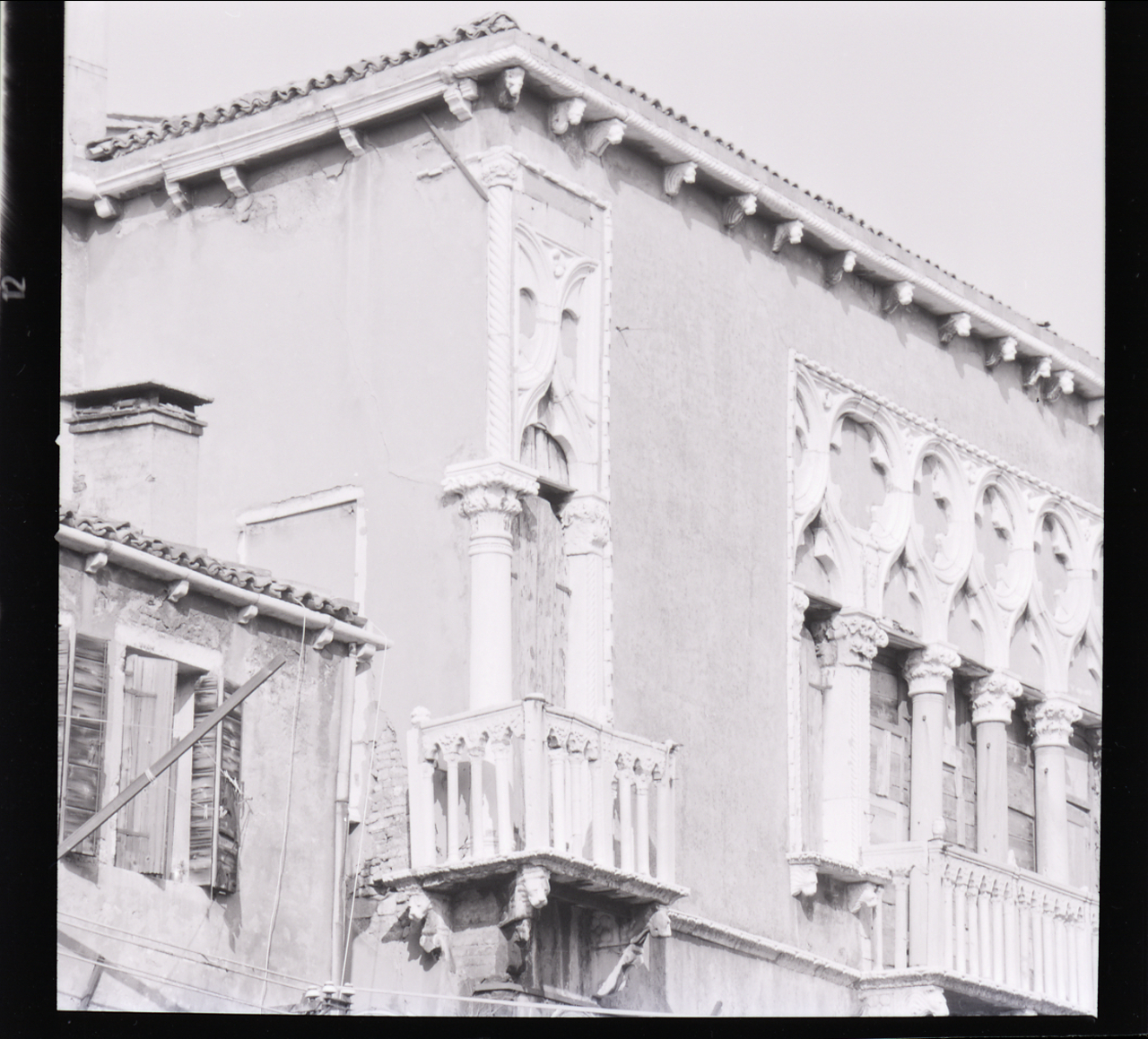
Side window, photo by Paolo Monti

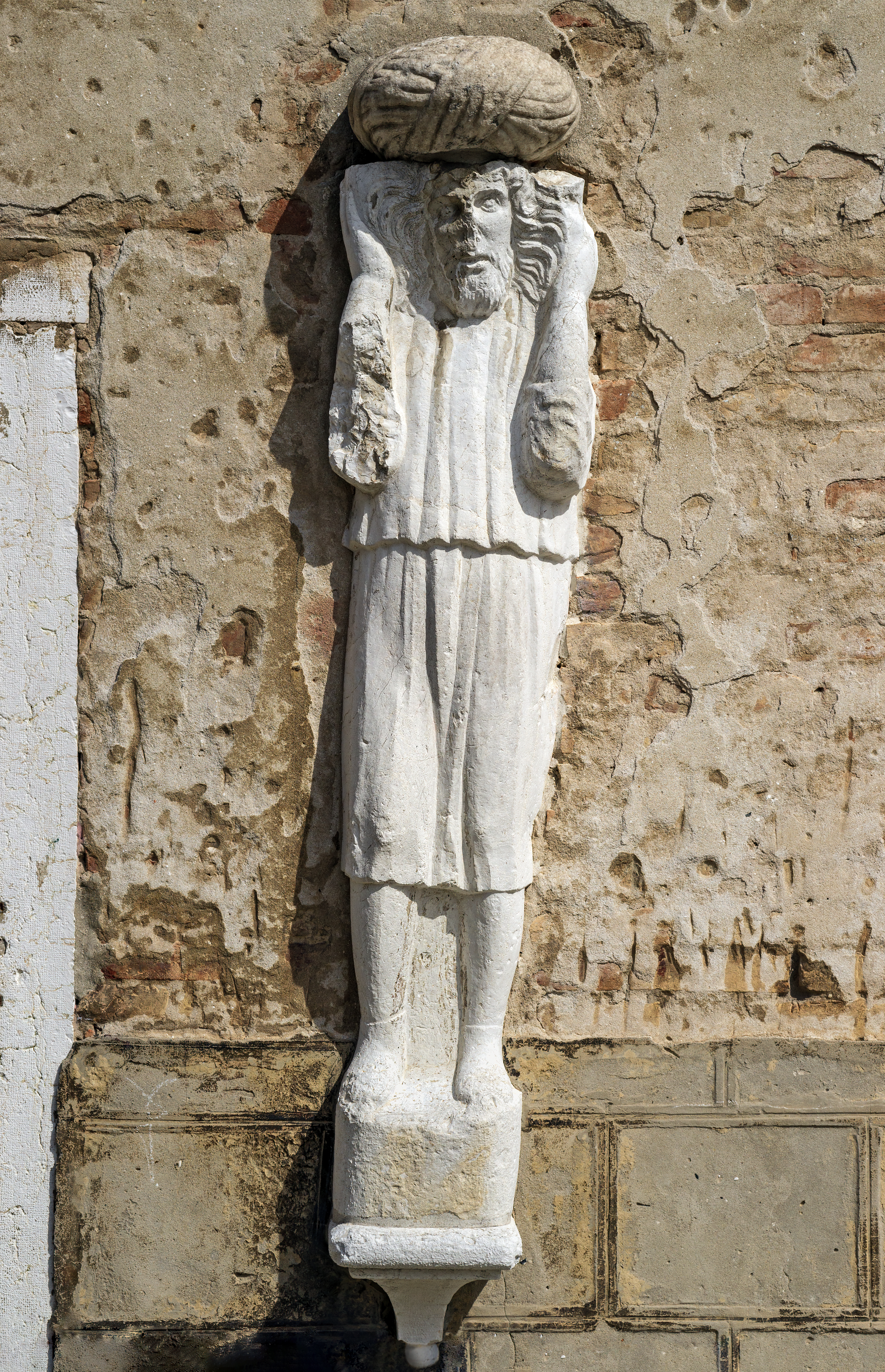
The Moor with the long hair

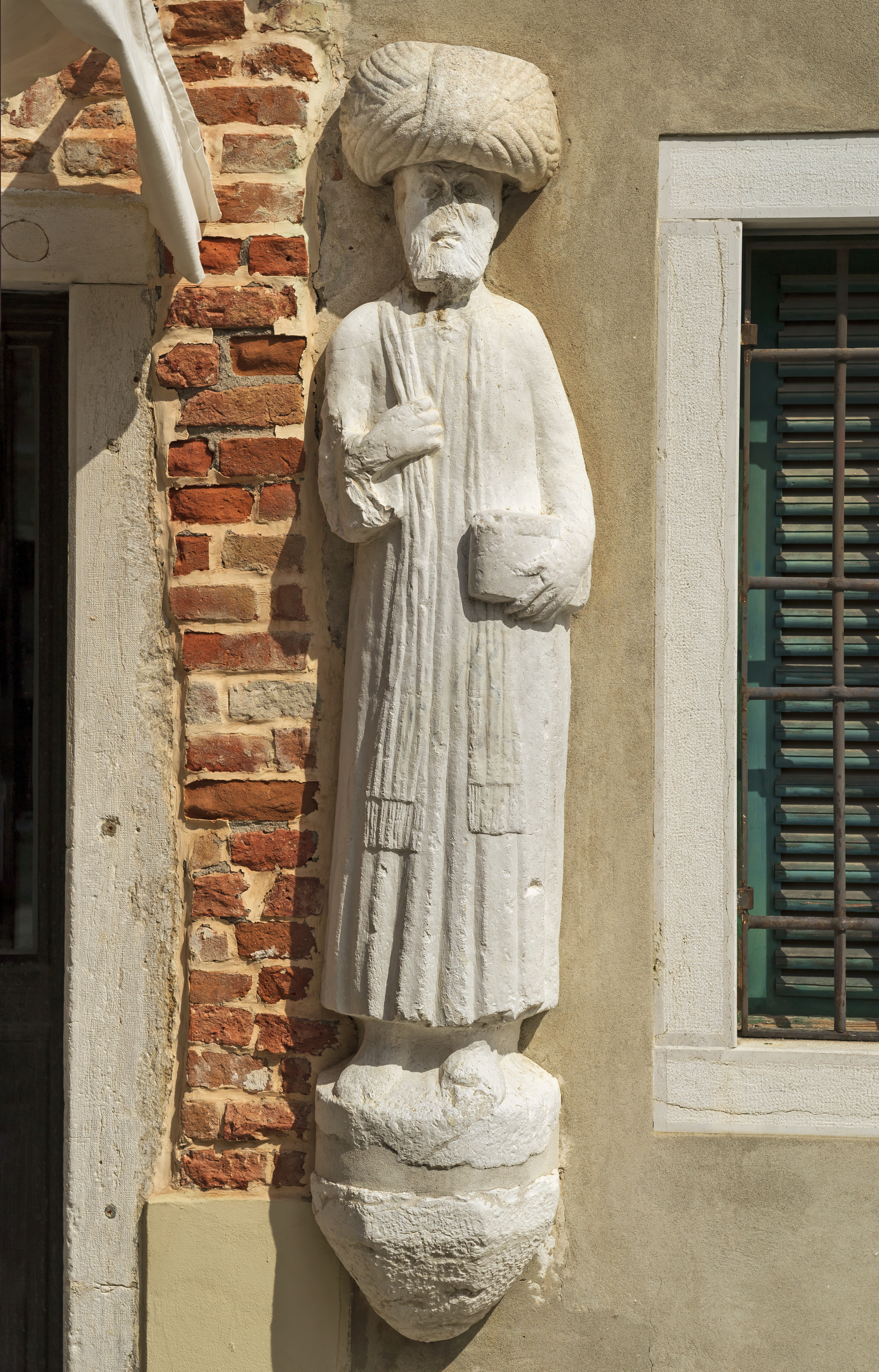
The Moor with the scarf

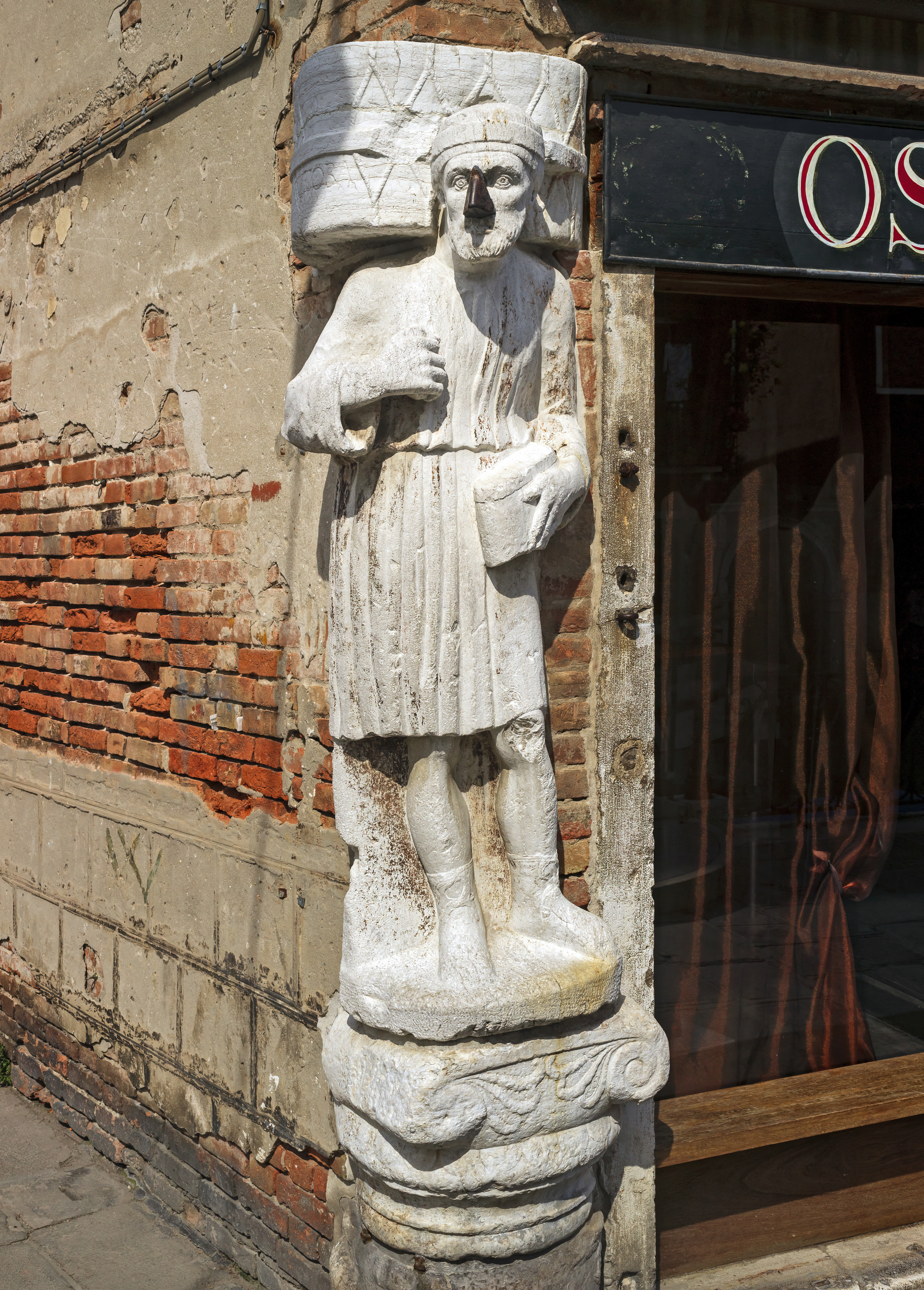
Rioba : The Moor with the Iron Nose

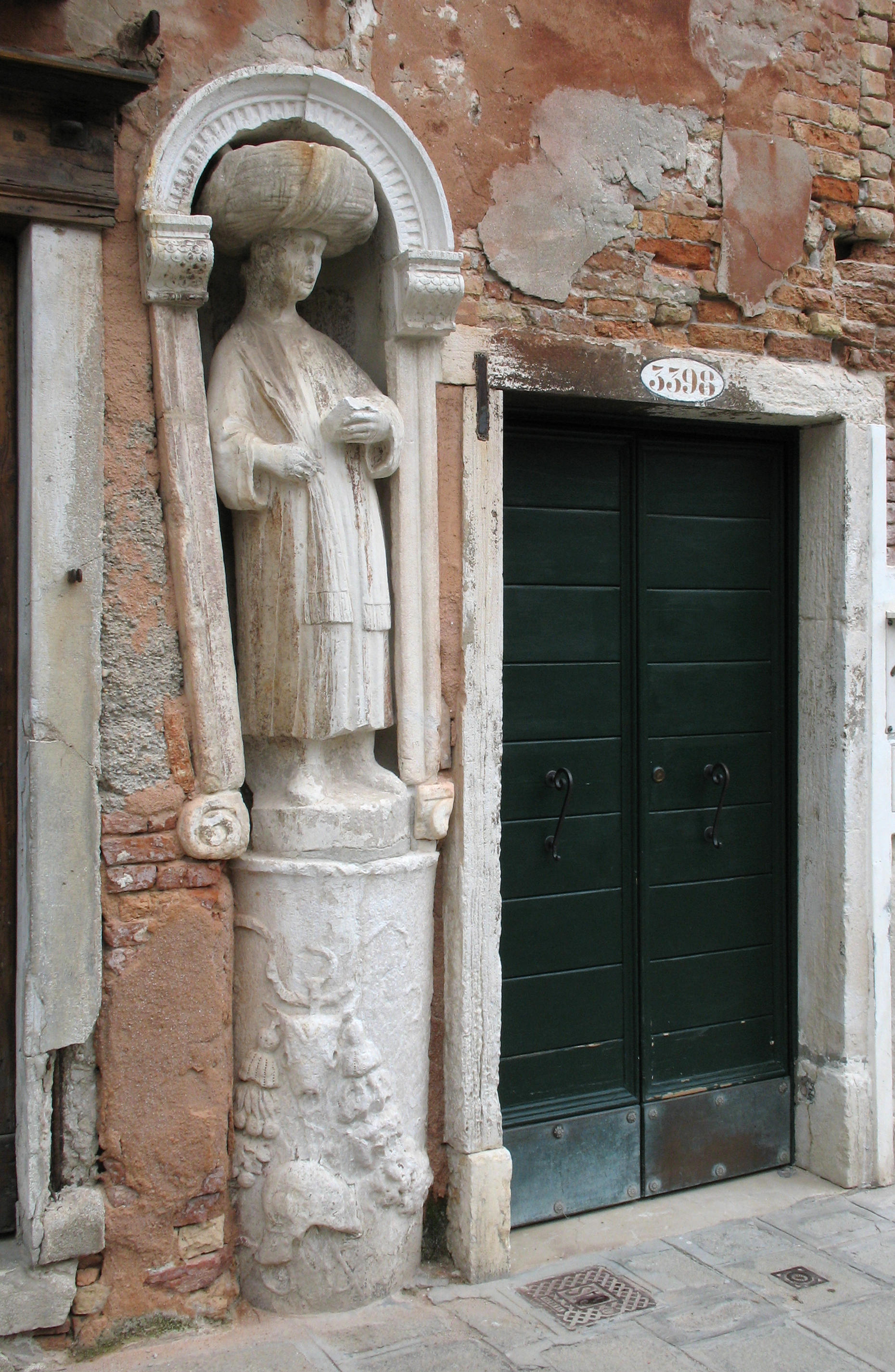
Statue of servant
