= Polifora =

Window divided by columns or pilasters into several parts

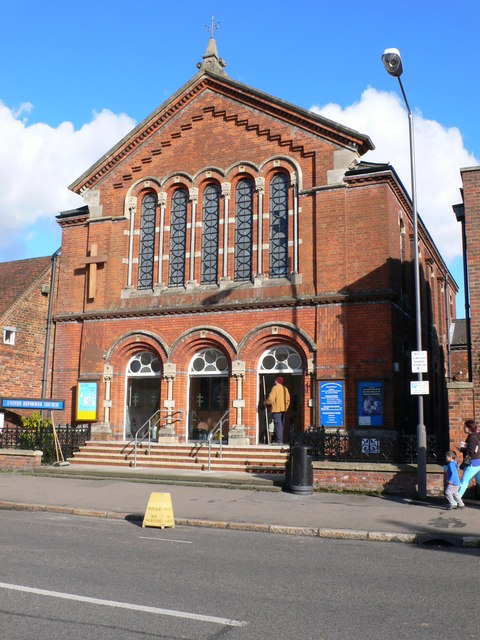
Beaconsfield United Reformed Church, Aylesbury End, Beaconsfield, Buckinghamshire, seen from west-southwest. Built in 1874–75.

Polifora is a type of the multi-light window. It appears in towers and belfries on top floors, where it is necessary to lighten the structure with wider openings. The term polifora usually refers to the window with at least five parts.

== Overview ==
The polifora is a multiple-part window, divided by small columns or pilasters. Each part has a small arch, which can be round or, more often, pointed. Central parts may sometimes be taller than side openings. The space among the arches is often decorated or perforated. The polifora is typical for Gothic architecture and widely used to decorate large cathedrals in the Northern Europe—particularly in Belgium and the Netherlands where the polifora became a true feature of distinction and personalization of the French Gothic style. The polifora is also widely used in Venetian Gothic architecture to decorate the main halls of Venetian palaces.

Such windows can sometimes take specific names that indicate the exact number of openings: pentafora (five parts) and hexafora (six parts) are the most common. Rarer are the windows with higher number of openings; for example the eight-part polifora of the Ca 'Foscari in Venice.

== Gallery ==
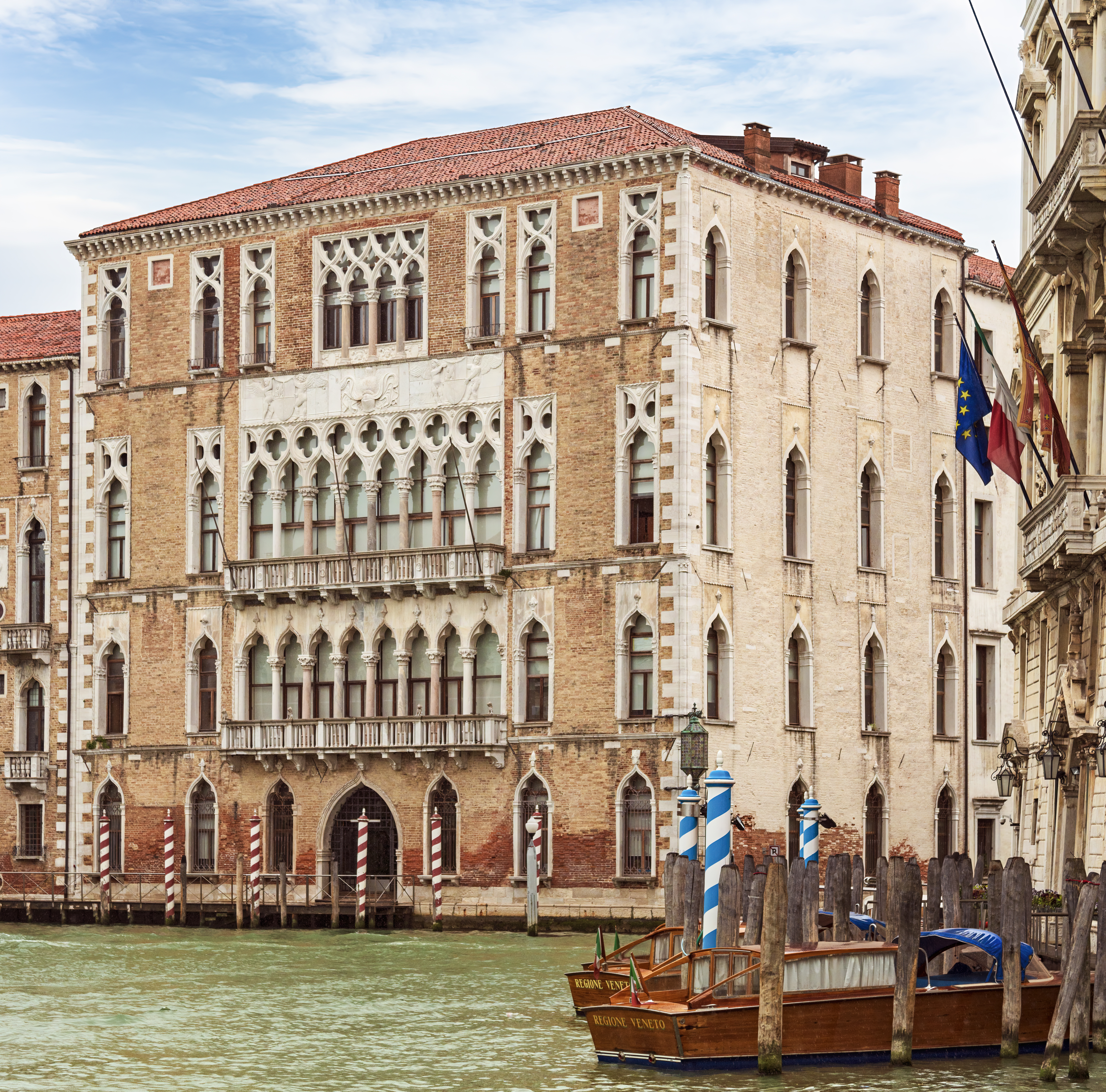
Ca' Foscari, Grand canal facade.

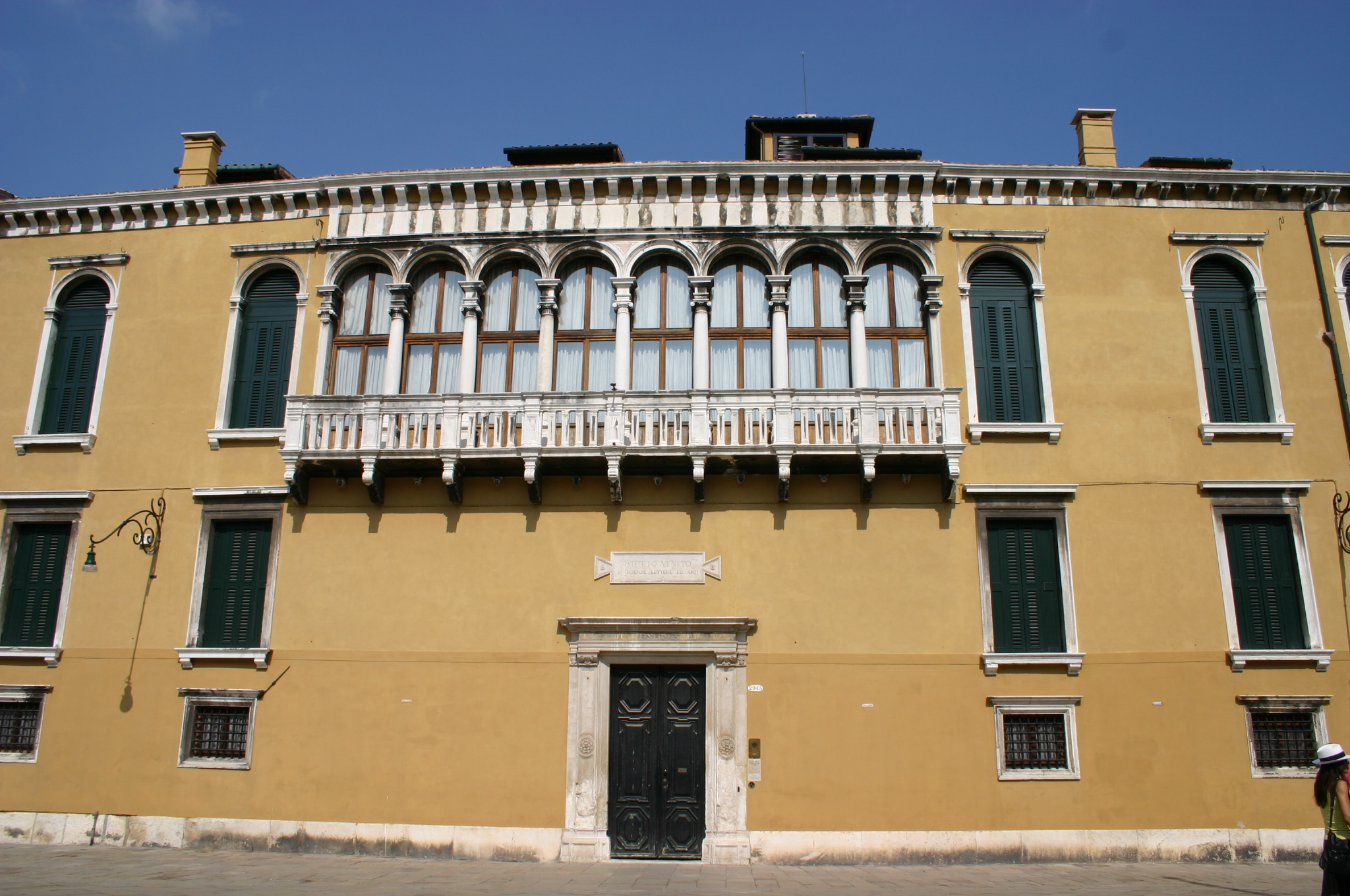
Main facade of Palazzo Loredan, Venice.

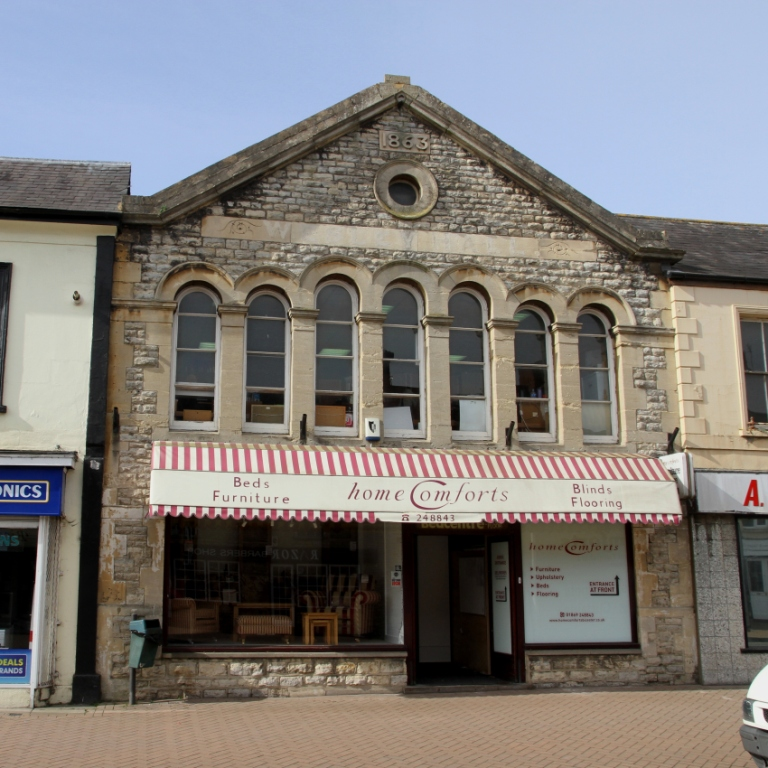
United Free Methodist Church, Bicester.

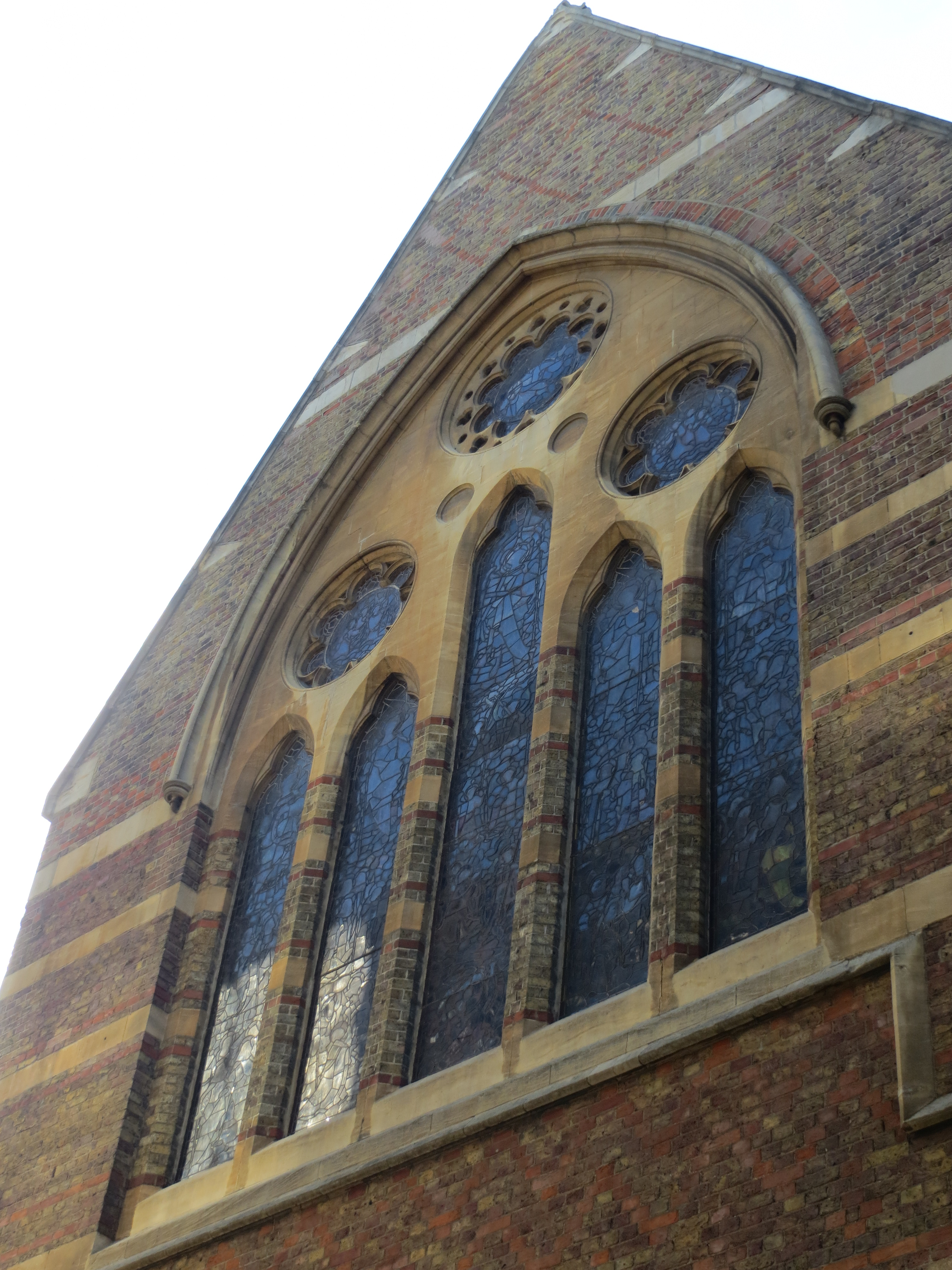
A window of the former parish church of St Michael, Leonard Street, London.

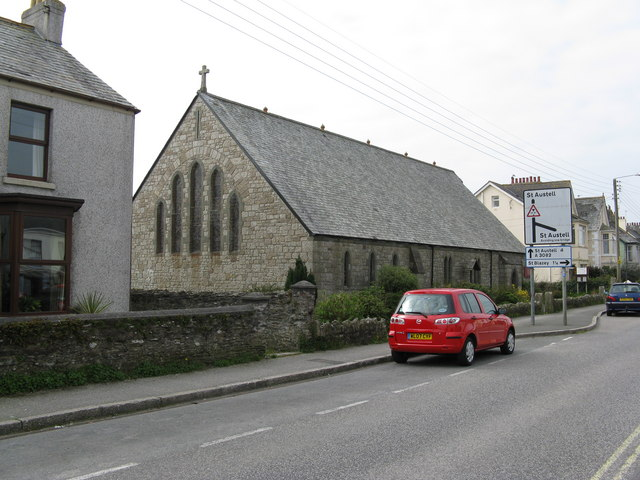
Parish church of the Good Shepherd, Par Green, Par, Cornwall.

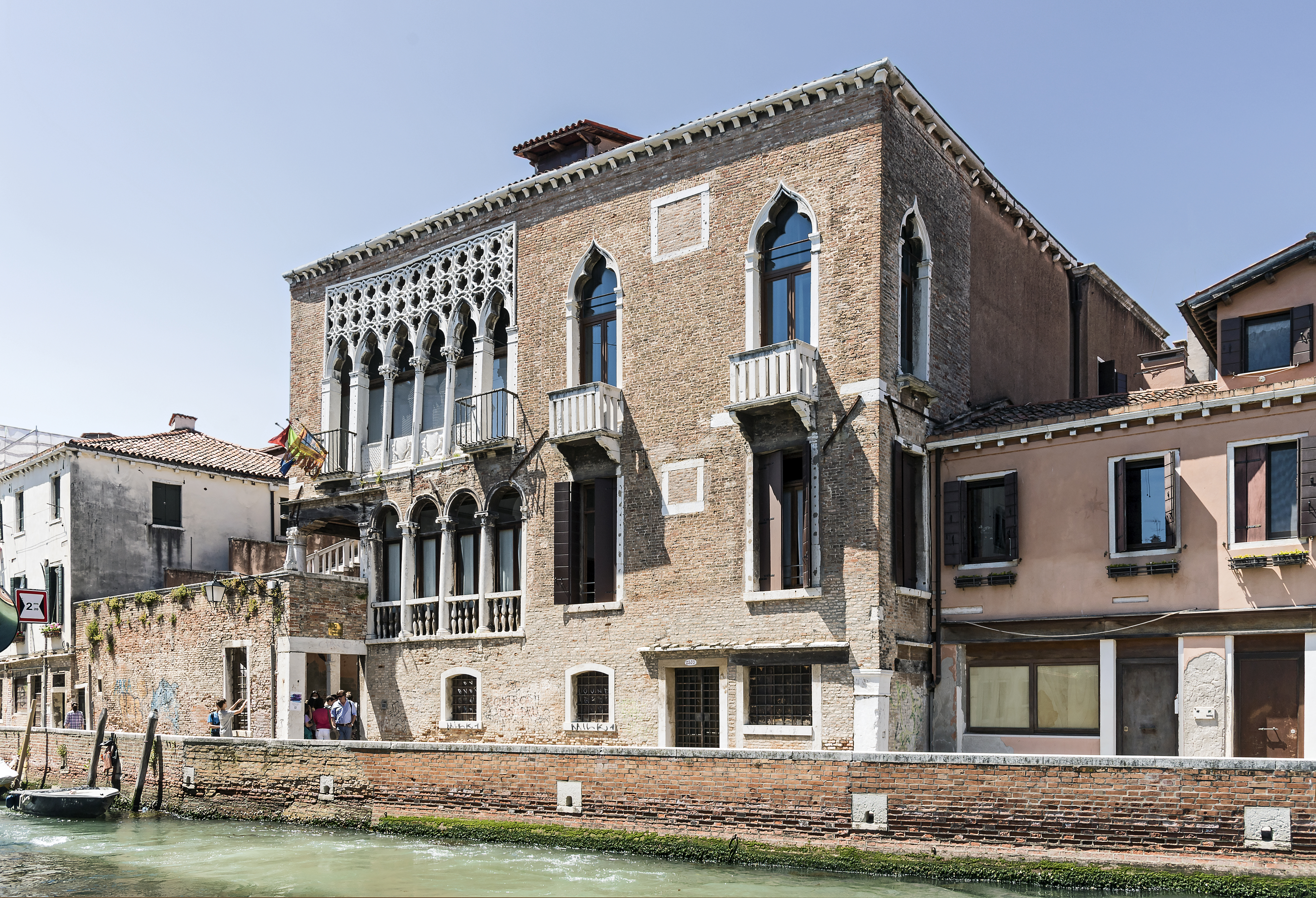
Palazzo Ariani, Venice

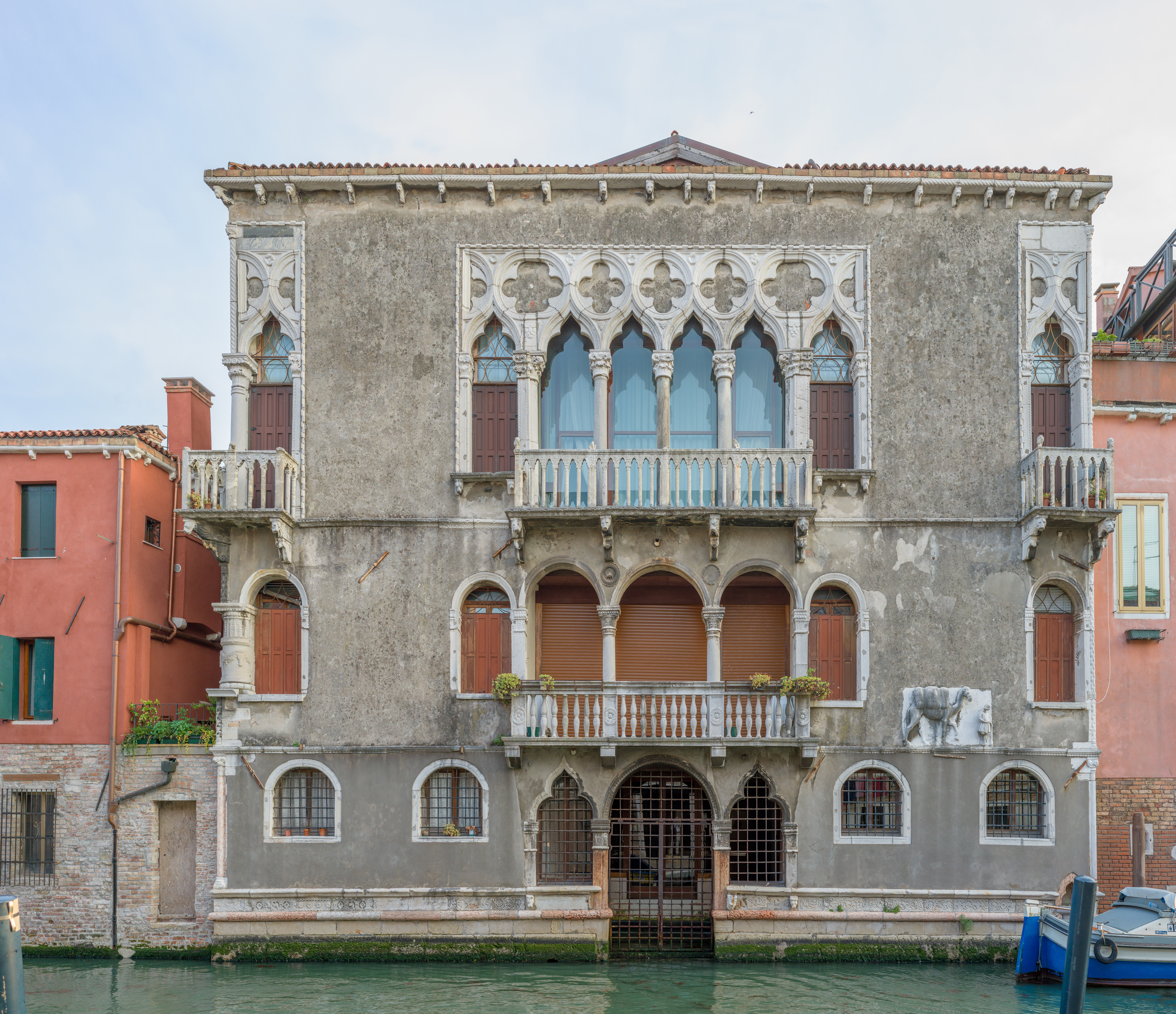
Palazzo Mastelli del Cammello, Venice

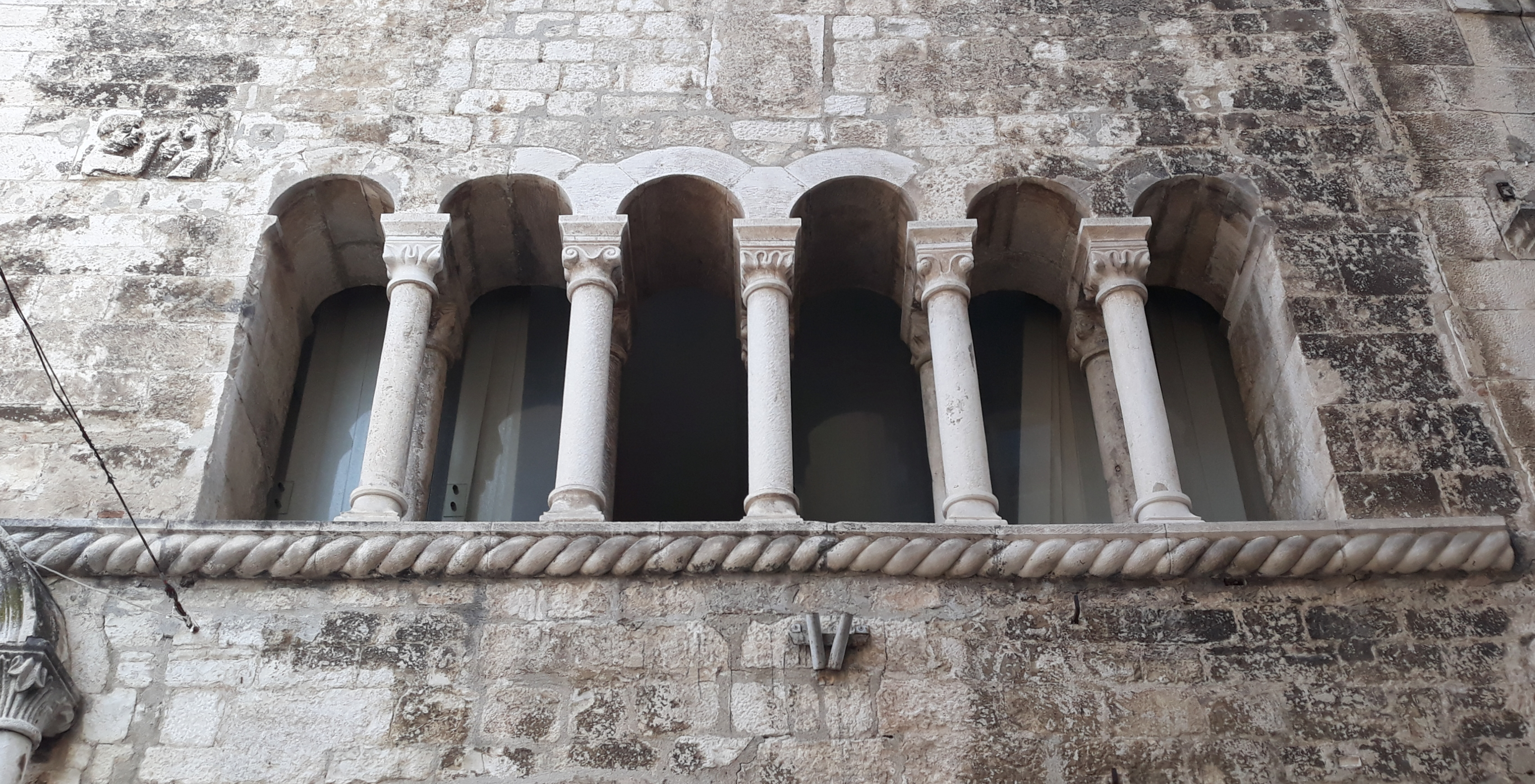
Polifora on Ciprianis-Benedetti Palace in Split, Croatia

== See also ==
- Monofora
- Bifora
- Trifora
- Quadrifora
- Glossary of architecture
