= Palazzo Ariani =

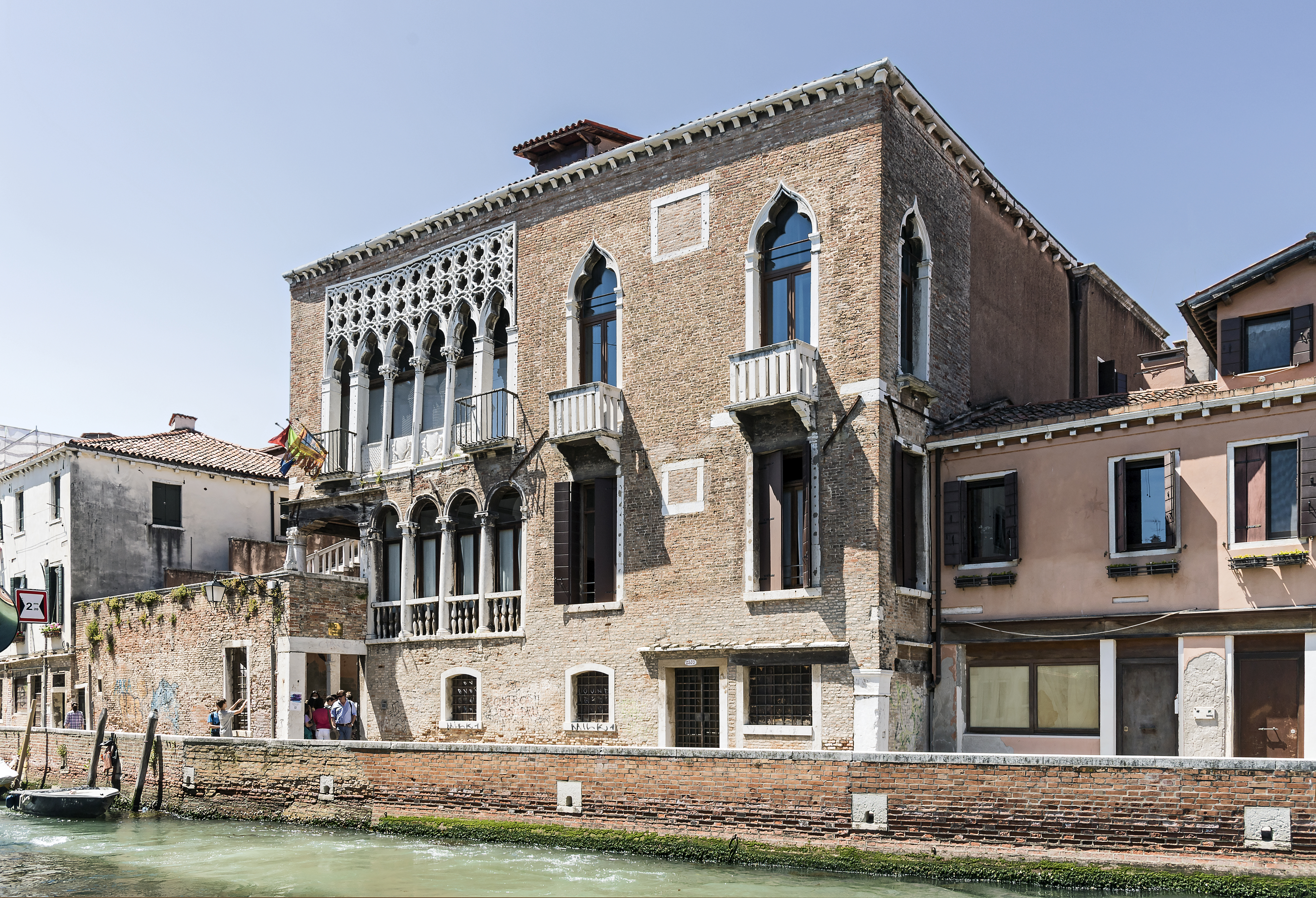
- Palazzo Ariani
- Interactive map of the Palazzo Ariani area

General information
- Type: Residential
- Architectural style: Gothic
- Location: Dorsoduro district, Venice, Italy
- Coordinates: 45°25′58.99″N 12°19′09.69″E
- Construction stopped: 14th century

Technical details
- Floor count: 3

Palazzo Ariani, also known as Palazzo Ariani Minotto Cicogna (in Venetian, Palazzo Arian), is a palace in Venice, located in the Dorsoduro district, almost opposite to the church of Angelo San Raffaele and not far from San Sebastiano. The nearby bridge Ponte del Soccorso connects it to the Palazzo Zenobio.

== History ==
The present palazzo was built in the 14th century on an ancient foundation of the first palace that was built in the 9th century. The building was home of the prominent Arian family, ascribed to the Venetian aristocracy, until its dying out in the 17th century. The last heir was Giacomo Arian who died about 1650. Then the palazzo passed to the Pasqualigo family. After numerous changes of ownership, the building ended up being owned by Lucia Cicogna, a nun who converted the building from a residence to a college for girls. At her death, the palazzo passed to the municipality and now is used as a public school.

== Architecture ==
Palazzo Ariani is a three-story building, one of the oldest examples of Venetian Gothic style in the city. The façade has a remarkable window layout: the left part is decorated with two ancient and elegant poliforas and the right part has two pairs of large Gothic lancet windows. The palazzo has its own courtyard, partly surrounded by the building and partly closed by the wall that closes the left end of the façade. A staircase supported by pointed arches starts from the courtyard, leading to the upper floors.
