= Palazzo Borghese-Aldobrandini =

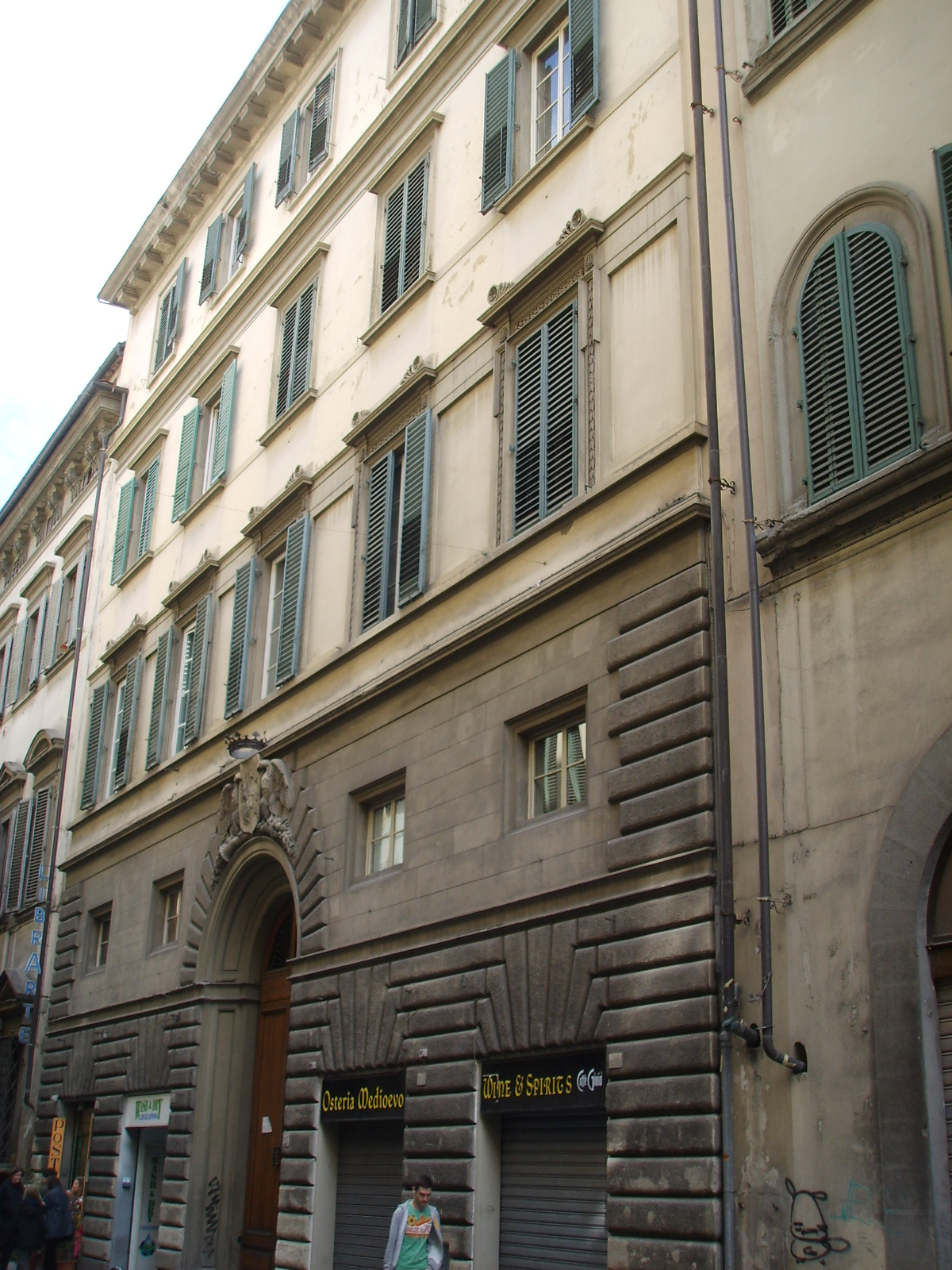
- Palazzo Borghese-Aldobrandini
- Interactive map of the Palazzo Borghese-Aldobrandini area

General information
- Status: In use
- Type: Palace
- Architectural style: Mannerist
- Location: Florence, Toscana, Italy, 123, via Ghibellina
- Coordinates: 43.770468°N 11.259084°E

Palazzo Borghese-Aldobrandini is a building in Florence, located at via Ghibellina 123.

== History and description ==
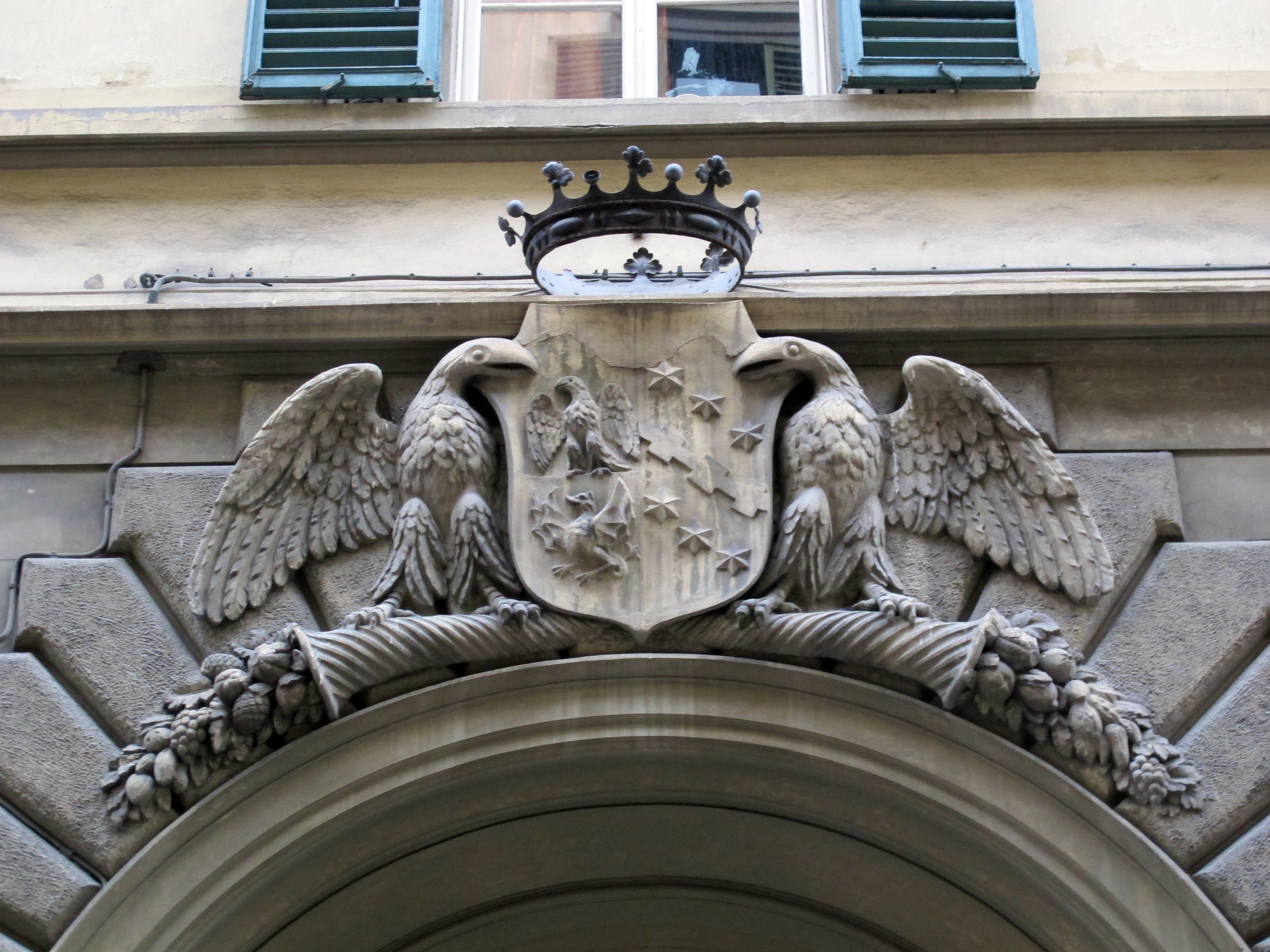
Coat of arms

The front of the palace can be traced back to the 1830s, with a large shield on the door with the coat of arms of the Famiglia Borghese (truncated in the 1st gold, to the eagle with unfolded flight of black, crowned of the field, in the 2nd azure, to the dragon of gold), supported by two eagles and surmounted by a wrought-iron princely crown.

As Stefania Bertano and Angelamaria Quartulli have documented on the basis of archival documentation, the building was commissioned by Francesco Borghese Aldobrandini (brother of Prince Camillo) to the architect Gaetano Baccani, who worked by reconfiguring four older houses that stood here. «There are two versions of the new façade, one dated 1830 and the one actually realised: the former is simple and less decorated than the latter, but still retains the most important architectural motifs: a basement area comprising the ground floor and mezzanine (architecture) crowned by a wide cornice separating it from the rest of the façade and on which the central portal archway is set. The substantial difference between the two versions can be seen in the use of architectural mouldings, which present greater decorative complexity in the last project, the one actually realised. The windows of the piano nobile, enriched with sculptural decorations with a floral motif, represent the only important feature of the façade, which in any case falls within the continuous curtain wall typology, interspersed with a monotonous sequence of openings, widely used in the first half of the 19th century».

Various decorators and painters worked on the interiors, including Gaetano Gori, Luigi Giarrè, Pasquale Micheli, Antonio Bettè, Carlo Scappini. It is worth noting the large entrance hall embellished with a statue.

== See also ==
- Palazzo al Canto di Sant'Anna

== Bibliography ==
=== Italian sources ===
- Piero Bargellini, Ennio Guarnieri, Le strade di Firenze, 4 voll., Firenze, Bonechi, 1977–1978, II, 1977, p. 28;
- Stefania Bertano, Angelamaria Quartulli, Gaetano Baccani architetto nella Firenze dell'ultima stagione lorenese, Firenze, Polistampa 2002, pp. 62–63 (Palazzo Aldobrandini Borghese in via Ghibellina).
- Cesati 2005, I, p. 277
- Claudio Paolini, Case e palazzi nel quartiere di Santa Croce a Firenze, Firenze, Paideia, 2008, pp. 101–102, n. 141;
- Claudio Paolini, Architetture fiorentine. Case e palazzi nel quartiere di Santa Croce, Firenze, Paideia, 2009, p. 163, n. 212.
