= Gaetano Baccani =

Italian architect

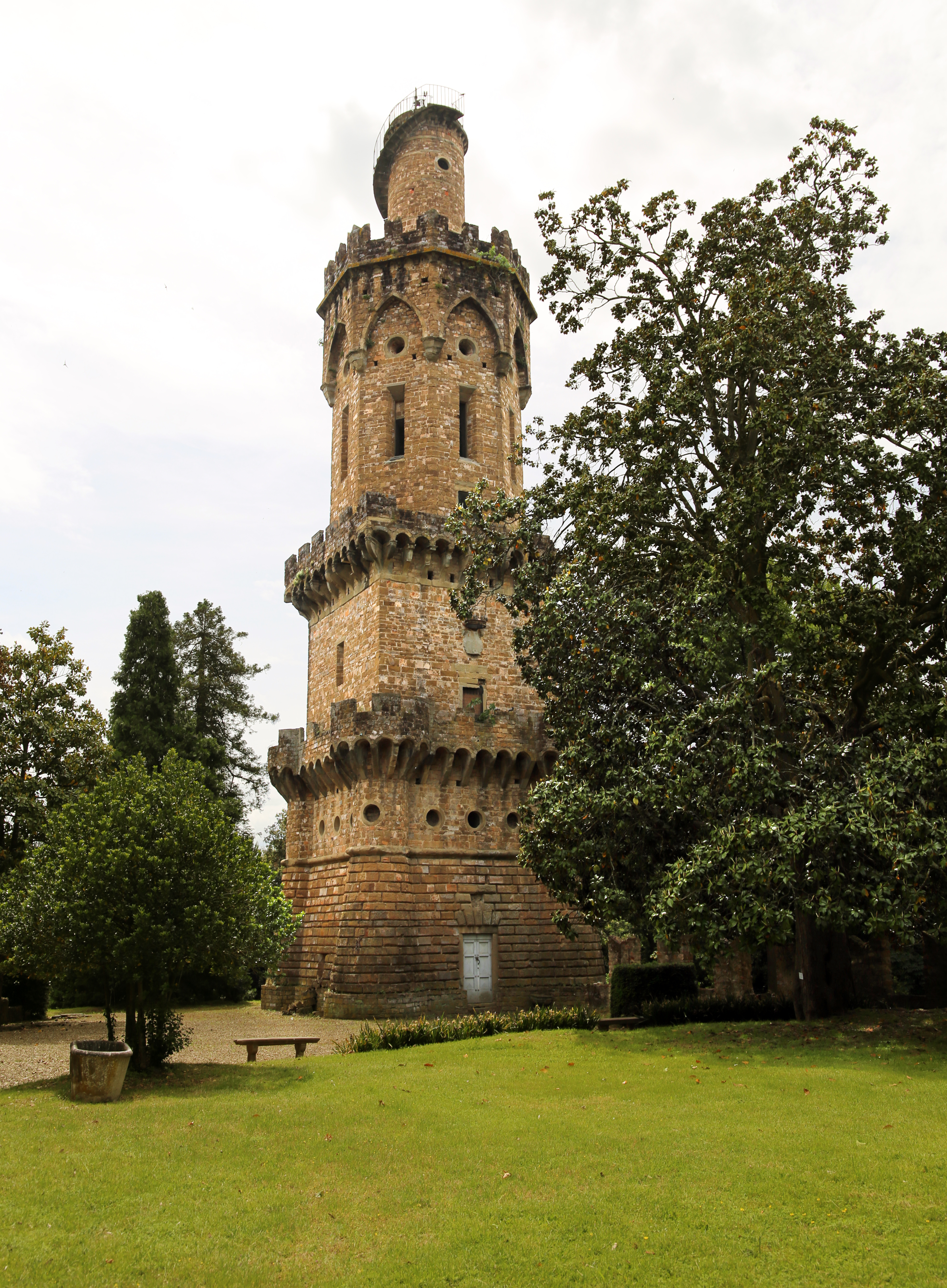
- Torrigiani Garden Tower
- Born: 6 June 1792; Florence, Grand Duchy of Tuscany
- Died: 12 July 1867 (aged 75); Florence, Kingdom of Italy
- Known for: Architecture
- Movement: Neoclassicism; Gothic Revival architecture

Gaetano Baccani (Florence, June 6, 1792 – Florence, July 12, 1867) was an Italian architect.

== Biography ==
Born in Florence, he studied under Giuseppe Cacialli at the school of architecture of the Accademia di Belle Arti di Firenze, which was directed by Gasparo Maria Paoletti, the leader of the Neoclassical architectural movement in Tuscany. In 1812 Baccani was awarded first prize for architecture in the Accademia's triennial competition with a design for a prison, a project that already demonstrated the principal characteristic of Baccani's work, his alternation between a Neoclassical vocabulary and a medieval, Romantic one. His earliest works in Florence were the Gothic Revival tower (1817–21) in the garden of the Marchesi Torrigiani in the Via dei Serragli, and the Neoclassical Palazzo Borghese-Aldobrandini (1821) in the Via Ghibellina.

In 1824 he succeeded Cacialli as architect to Florence Cathedral, and in 1826, when the Piazza del Duomo was extended to the south, he designed the adaptation and new façade of the Canonica di Santa Maria del Fiore. Baccani prepared the plan for the enlargement of the Piazza, with the creation of a vague portico of neoclassical style on the south side; statues of Arnolfo di Cambio and Filippo Brunelleschi were inserted in the central loggia of the new Palazzo dei Canonici on the cathedral's southern flank to celebrate the values and protagonists of Tuscan culture.

Baccani also directed the remodelling of numerous houses in Florence, including the Palazzo Brignole-Durazzo (1824) in the Via dei Servi; the Palazzo Capponi (1825) in the Via Giusti; the Palazzo Gandini Borghese (1826); the Palazzo Borghese-Aldobrandini, where the imposing rustic facade surmounted by a slender Ionic colonnade stands out; and the headquarters (1843) of the Arciconfraternita della Misericordia. In 1832–3 he built the funerary monument and mausoleum for the Grand Duchess Maria Anna of Saxony in the church of San Lorenzo and between 1842 and 1845 restored the choir of Florence Cathedral. He also later designed and supervised the restoration and decoration of the Teatro alla Pergola (1855–7). Between 1847 and 1865 the bell tower of Santa Croce was built to his designs; this reflects the Gothic style of the Franciscan basilica and is considered Baccani's masterpiece. Baccani died in Florence on July 12, 1867.

== Works ==
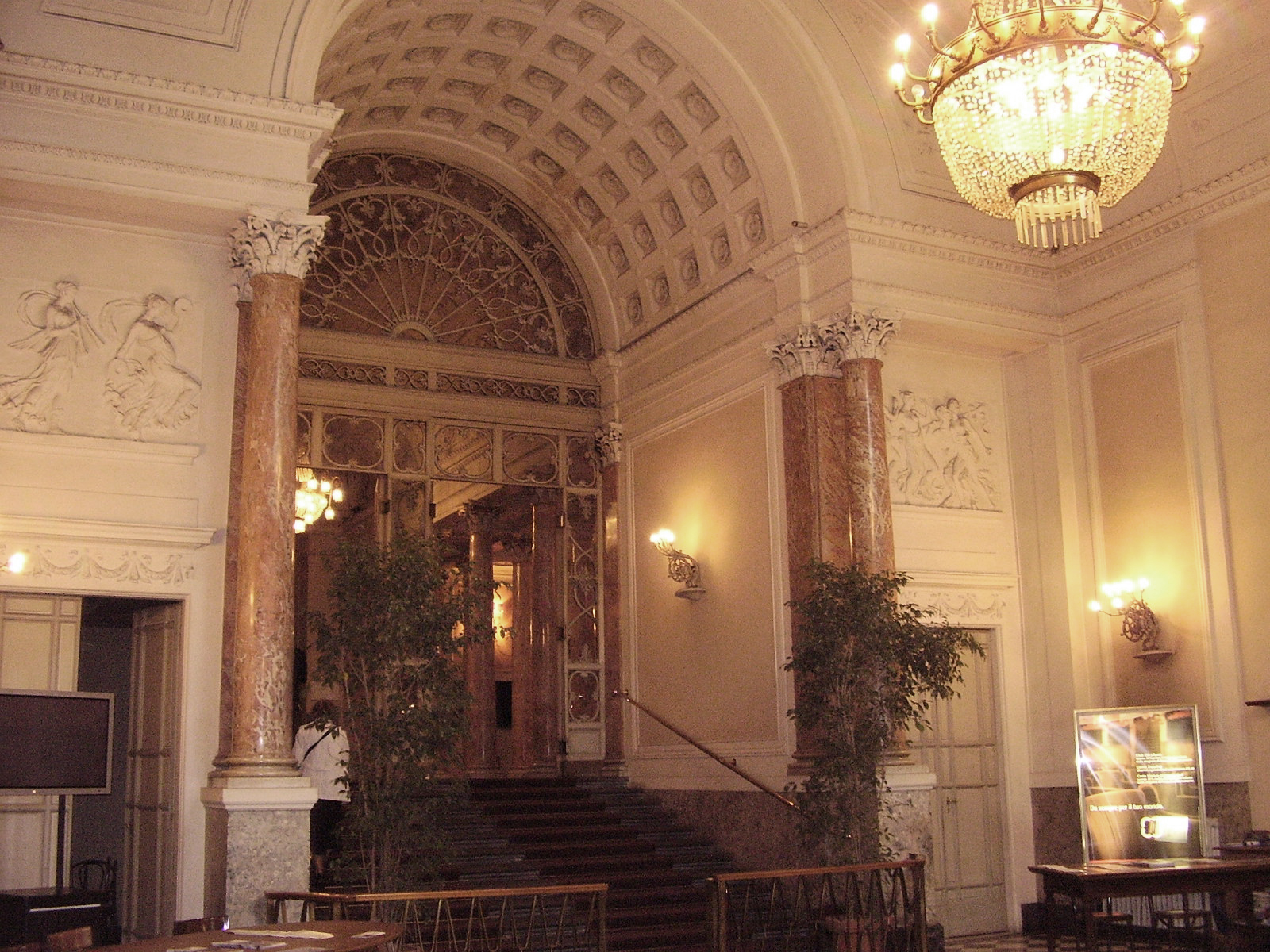
Main entrance of the Teatro della Pergola

- Torrigiani Garden Tower (1820);
- Façade of the Palazzo Borghese-Aldobrandini (1821);
- Palazzi dei Canonici, Piazza del Duomo, Florence (1825–1830);
- Funerary monument and mausoleum for the Grand Duchess Maria Anna of Saxony in San Lorenzo (1832–1833);
- Façade and vestibule of the Teatro della Pergola (1855);
- Renovation of San Lorenzo (1858–1860);
- Casino Salviati in Borgo Pinti (1834);
- Palazzo Capponi in Via Giusti (1825);
- Church of the Madonna del Buonconsiglio, Frosini, Chiusdino;
- Renovation of the interiors of Santa Maria del Fiore;
- Bell tower of Santa Croce (designed in 1842 and completed in 1847–1865).
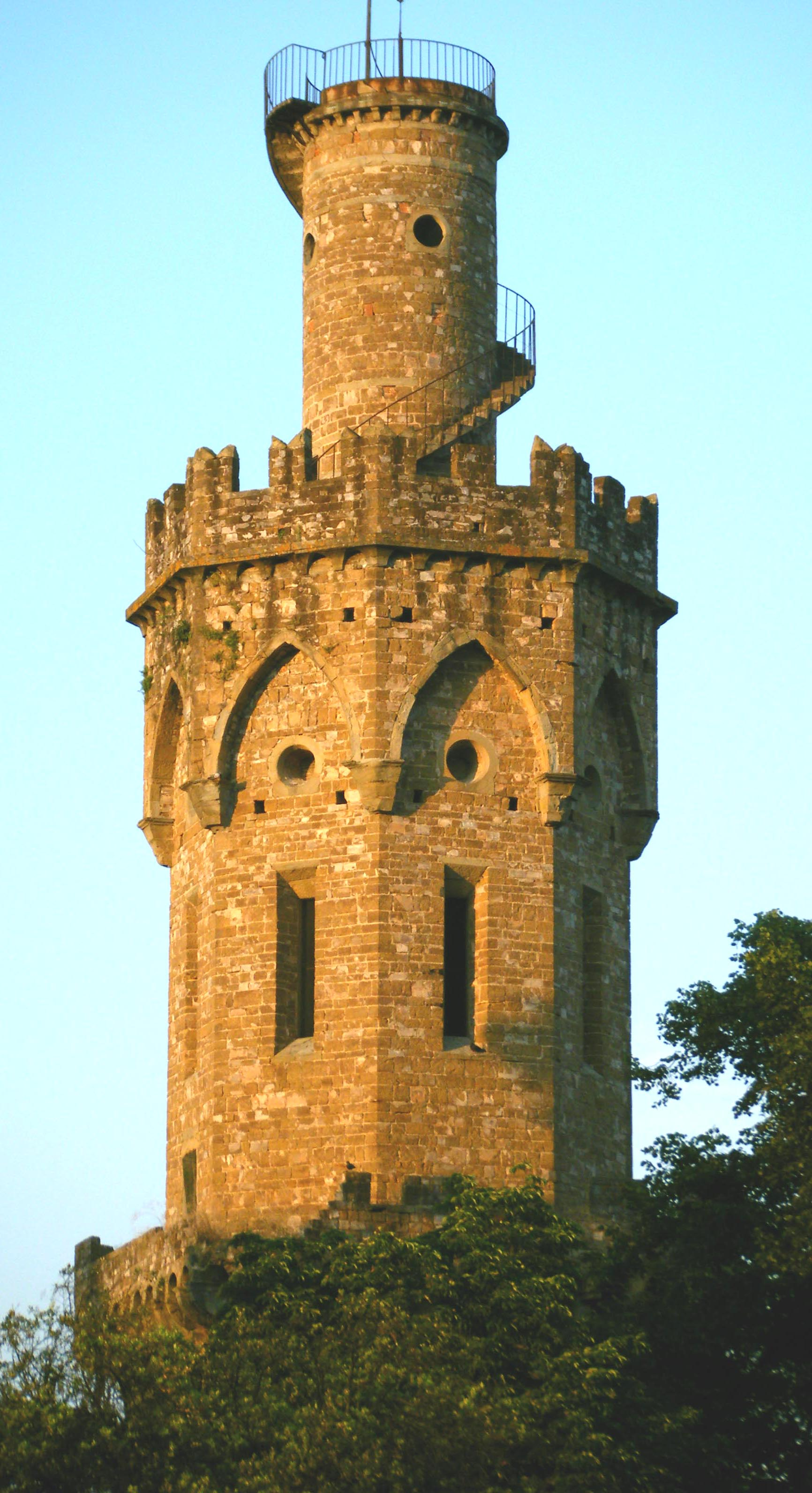
Torrino del Baccani, 1822

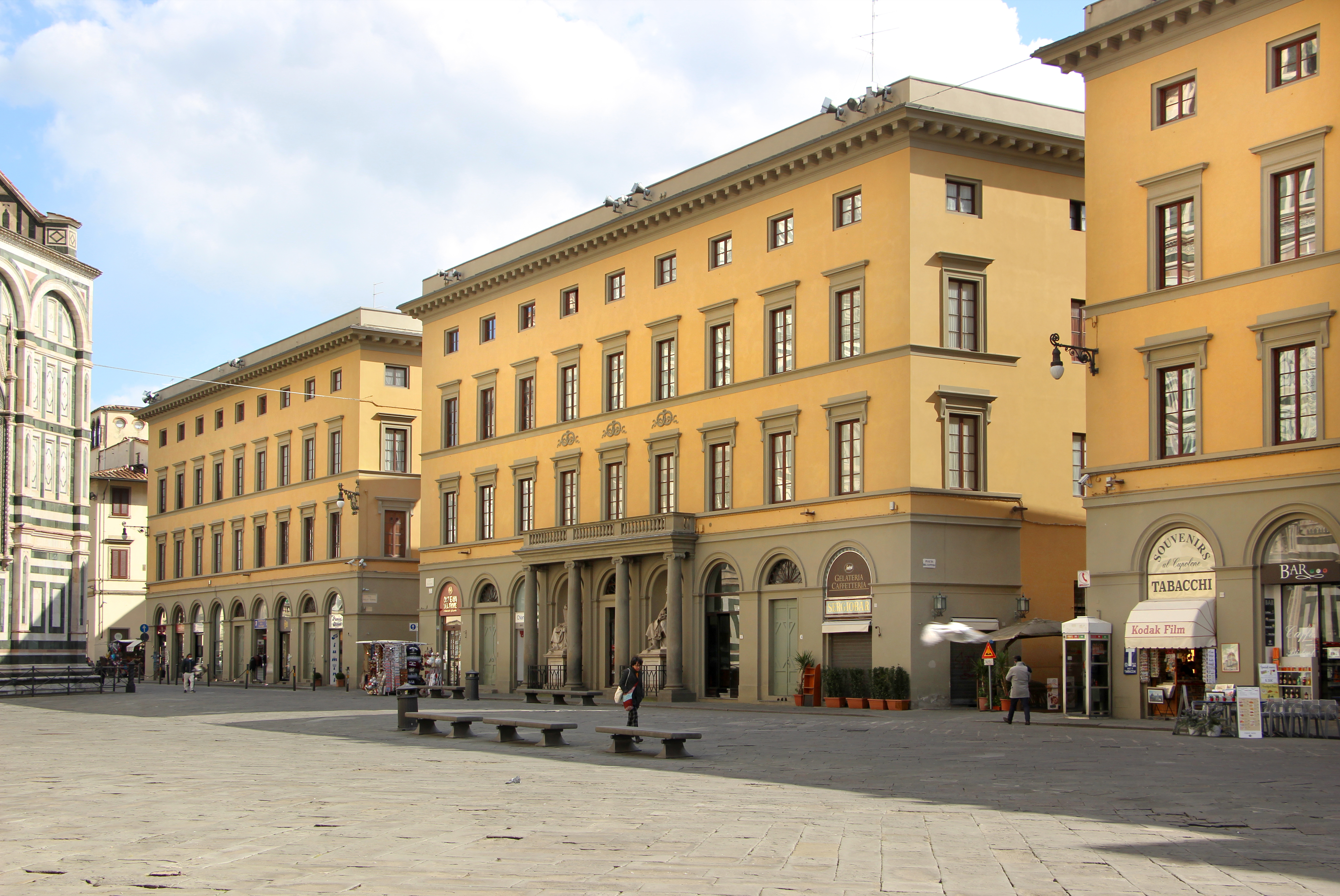
Palazzi dei Canonici, Florence, 1825–1830

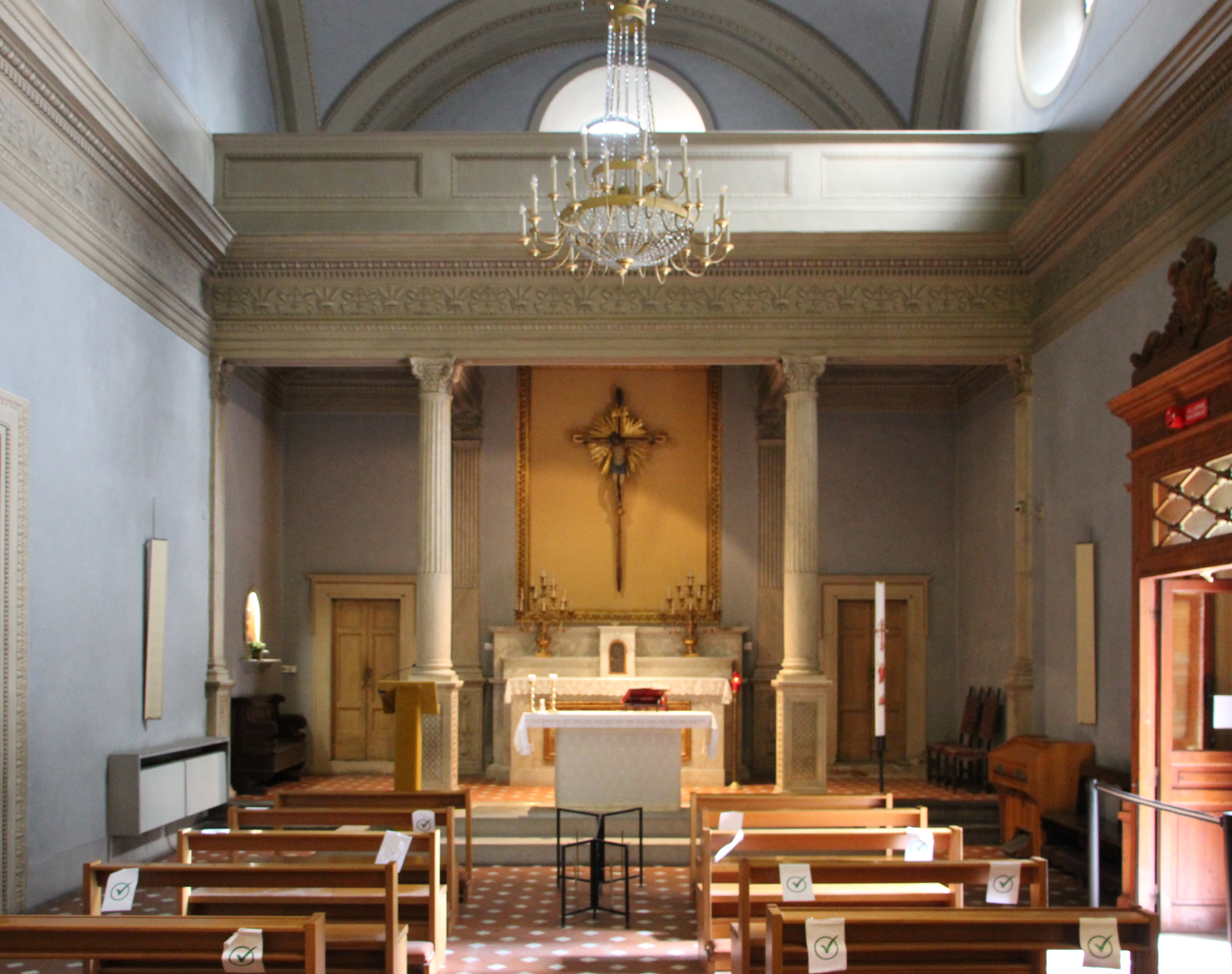
Cappella della Pura, interior, 1841

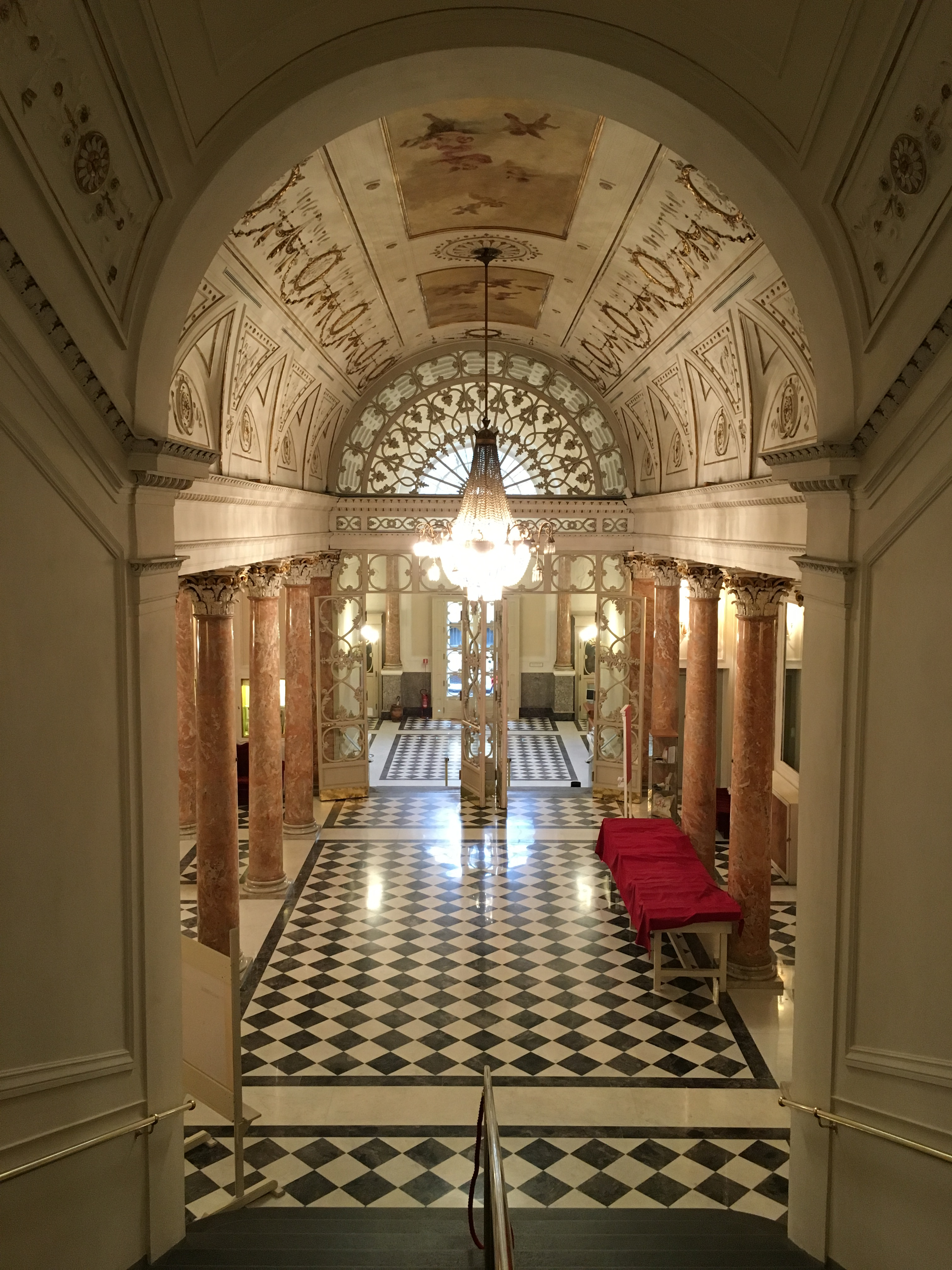
Teatro della Pergola, interior, 1855

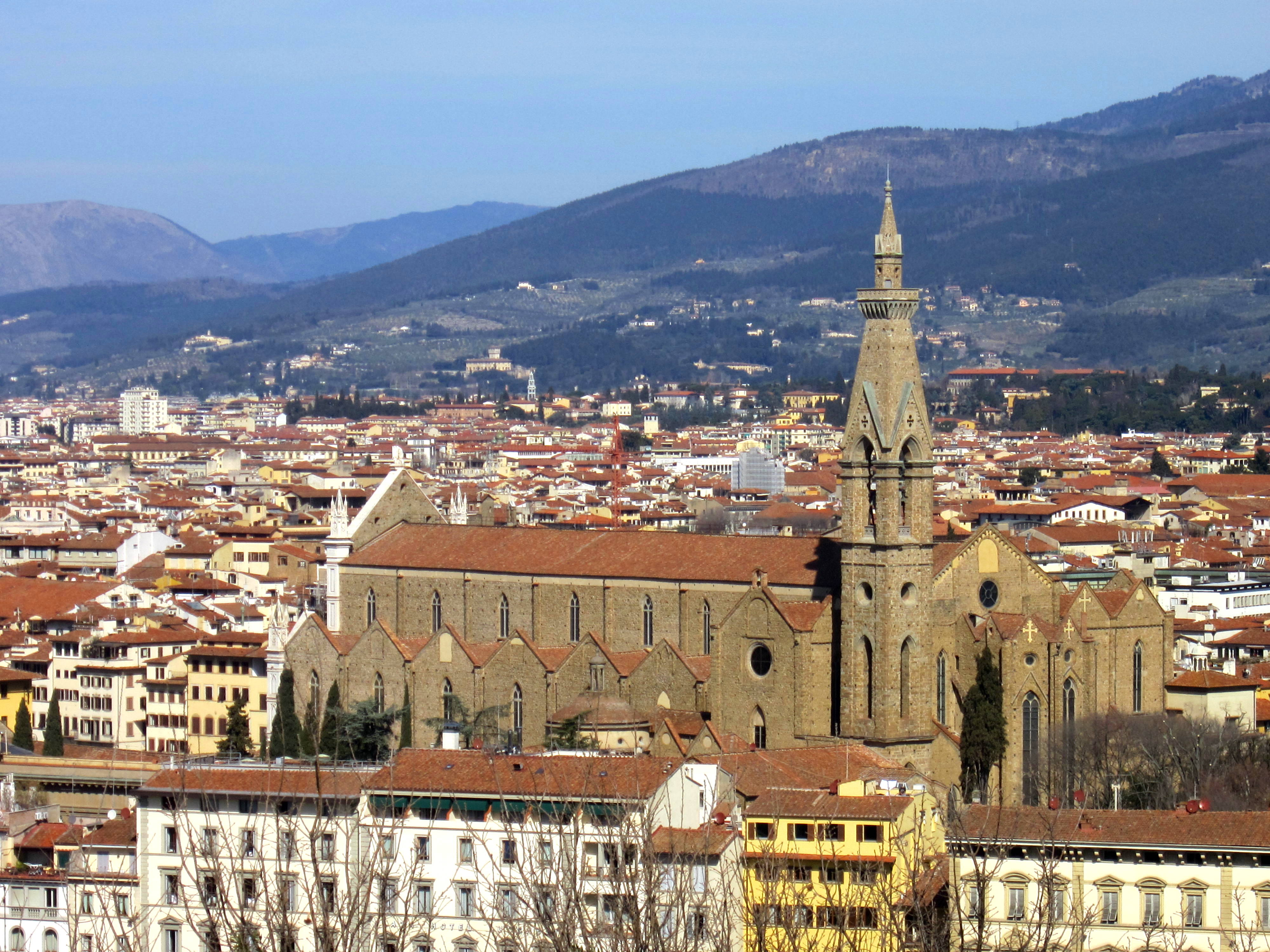
Bell tower of Santa Croce, 1847–1865

== Bibliography ==
- Collezione dei progetti di architettura premiati nei grandi concorsi triennali dell'I. e R. Accademia di Belle Arti in Firenze, 36–42. Florence. 1828. pp. 40–46.
- Raffo Pani, Silvana (1963). "BACCANI, Gaetano". Dizionario Biografico degli Italiani (in Italian). Vol. 5: Bacca–Baratta. Rome: Istituto dell'Enciclopedia Italiana. OCLC 883370.
- Meeks, C. L. V. (1966). Italian Architecture, 1750–1914. New Haven and London: Yale University Press. pp. 135, 216–20.
- Cresti, C.; Zangheri, L. (1978). Architetti e ingegneri nella Toscana dell'Ottocento. Florence: Uniedit. pp. XXXIII–XXXVIII, 8–9.
- Ruschi, P. (1986). "I campanili di Santa Croce". Santa Croce nell'800. Florence: Alinari. pp. 18–38.
- Cerretelli, C. (1987). "Cento progetti". Due granduchi, tre re e una facciata, Opera di Santa Maria del Fiore di Firenze. Florence: Alinea Ed. pp. 109–11, 169–71.
- S., Bertano; A., Quartulli (2002). Gaetano Baccani architetto nella Firenze dell'ultima stagione lorenese. Florence: Polistampa. ISBN 978-88-8304-406-9.
