= Palazzo al Canto di Sant'Anna =

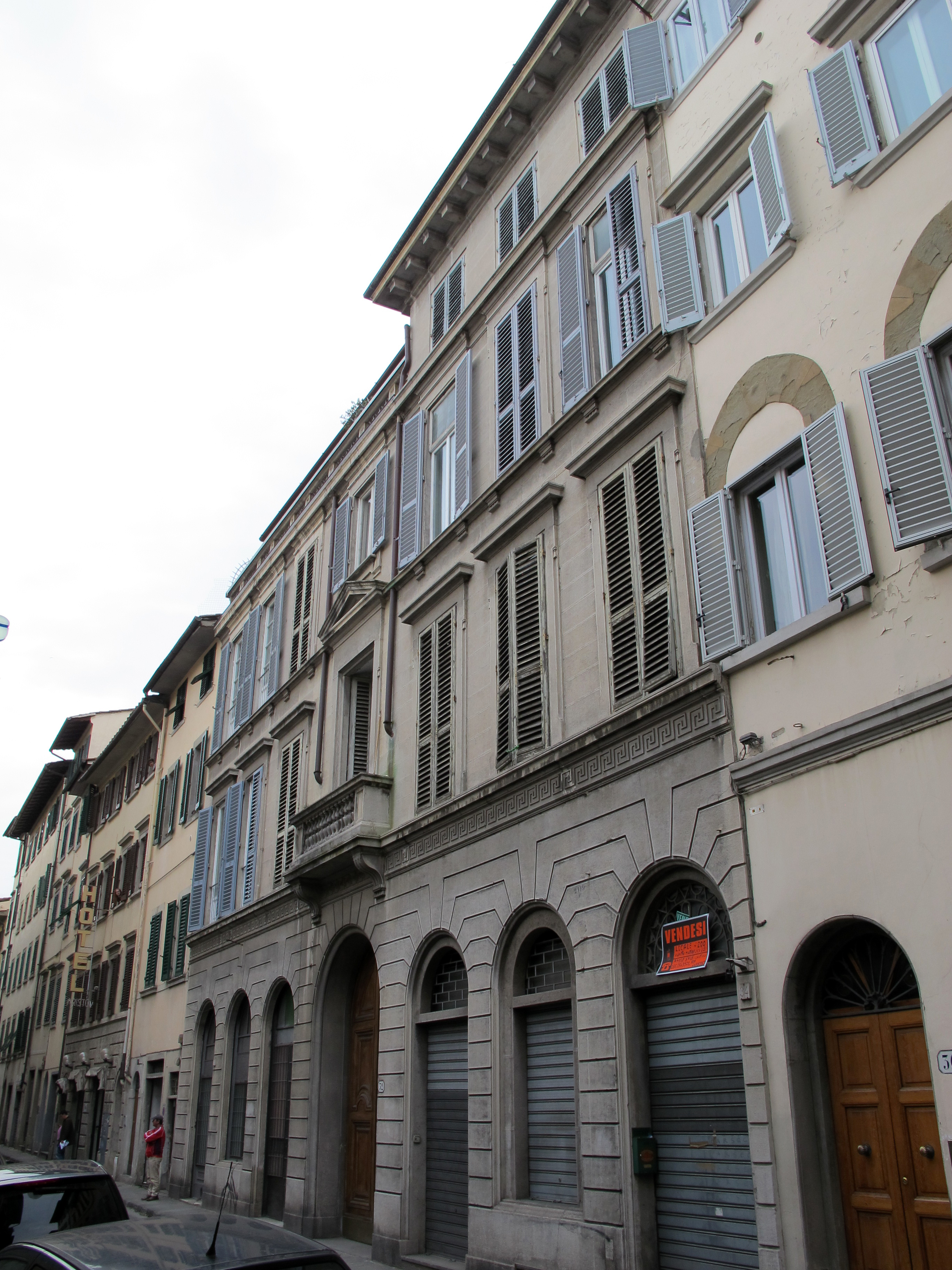
- The palace façade on Via Fiesolana
- Interactive map of the Palazzo al Canto di Sant'Anna area

General information
- Status: In use
- Type: Palace
- Architectural style: Mannerist
- Location: Florence, Toscana, Italy, 32, via Fiesolana
- Coordinates: 43.772792°N 11.263856°E

The Palazzo al Canto di Sant'Anna is a building in Florence, composed of two bodies, with one façade on Via de' Pepi 67 and one on Via Fiesolana 32.

== History and description ==
This is a large palazzo that on Via Fiesolana shows seven axes on three floors, with the central doorway surmounted by a balcony, the result of a late 19th century renovation carried out on a block of pre-existing houses. On Via de' Pepi, the façade is organised in nine axes on four floors, with the ground floor of great elevation, marked in the centre by a fine doorway framed by stone ashlars, raised from the street level by three steps and defended by two parachutes, denoting a value that is today scarcely perceptible due to the façade's poor condition.

The building is mentioned by Gabriella Orefice as an example, in the Santa Croce district, of "...a successful operation of transformation of the ancient, dilapidated blocks of flats into a dignified building for bourgeois use, with innovative features compared to the recurring Florentine typologies, particularly if one considers the narrow and deep courtyard, in axis with the entrance portal, along which long balconies supported by corbels develop". The same building is also mentioned in Bargellini and Guarnieri's stradario for the courtyard mentioned earlier, called 'chiostrino' with paintings of religious subjects. In reality, the paintings are found in the entrance hall on the Via Fiesolana side and are related to a late 16th century taste, with scenes of the Genesis between grotesques. In the central panel is a representation of Faith, and in the side panels the Creation of Eve and the Withdrawal of the waters of the universal flood. Such subjects would suggest the presence in antiquity of a religious institute, perhaps dedicated to St. Anne, whose tabernacle existed not far away, giving its name to the nearby Canto di Sant'Anna.

== More pictures of the Palace ==
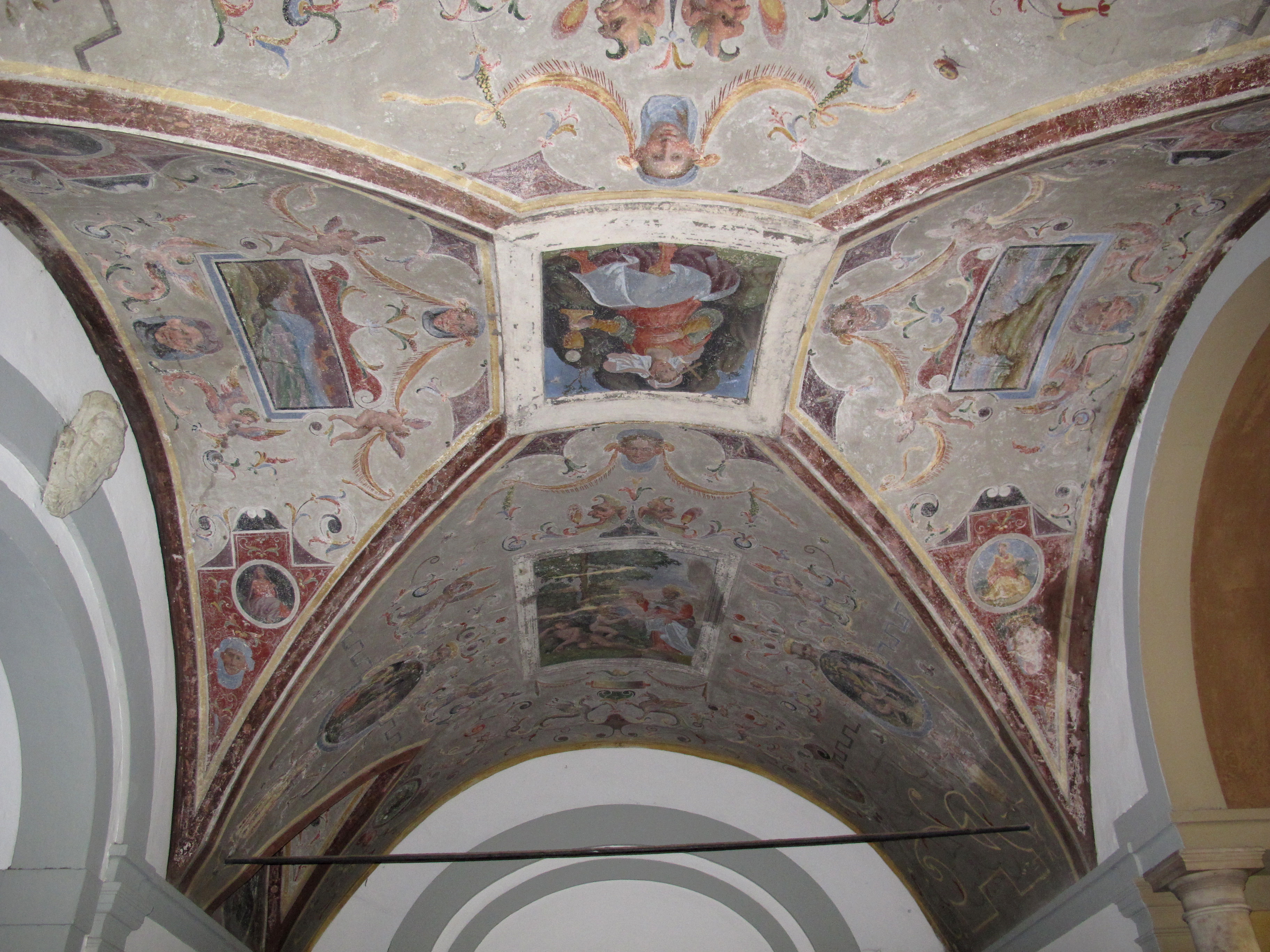
Frescoes

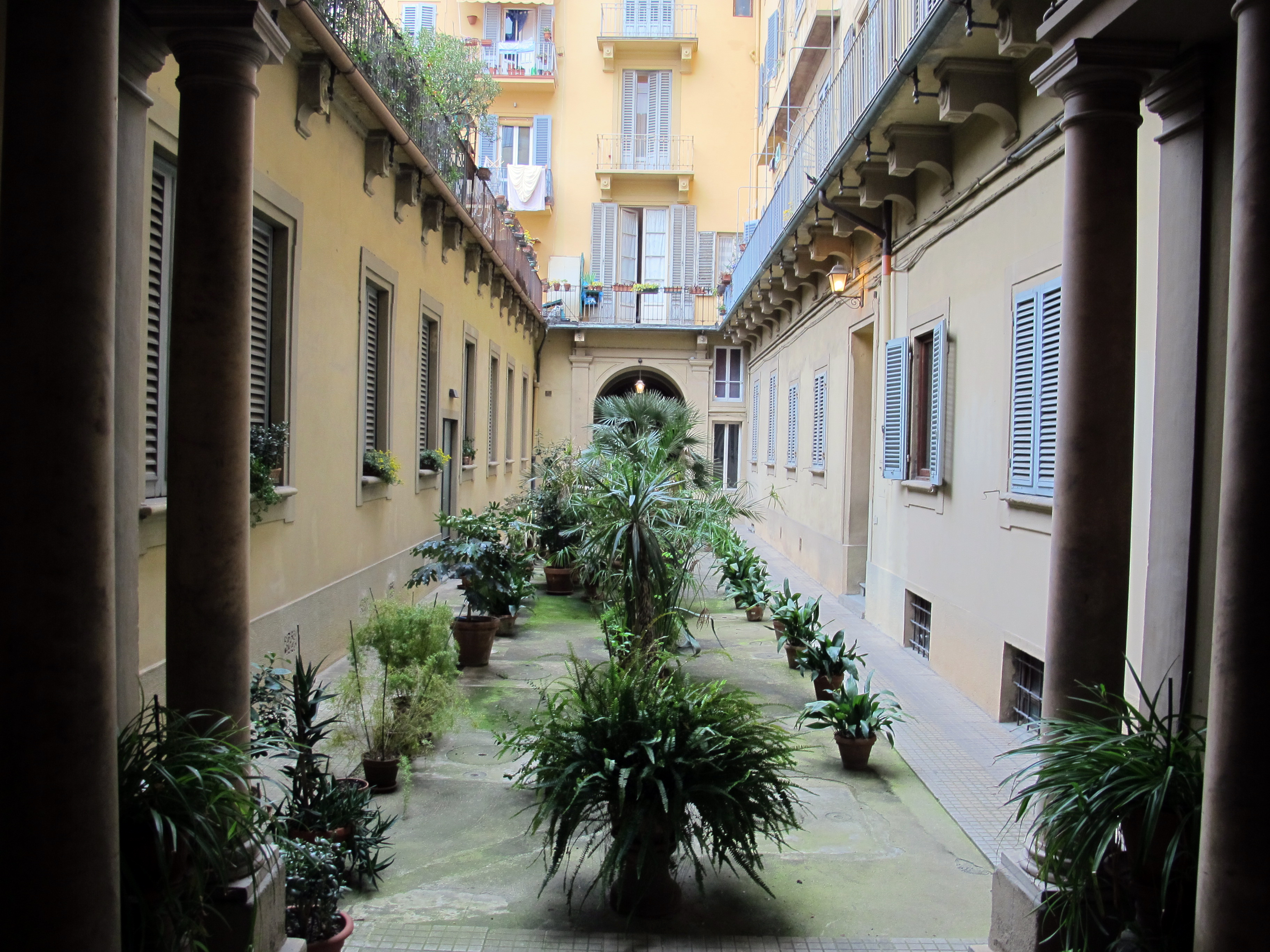
The palace courtyard

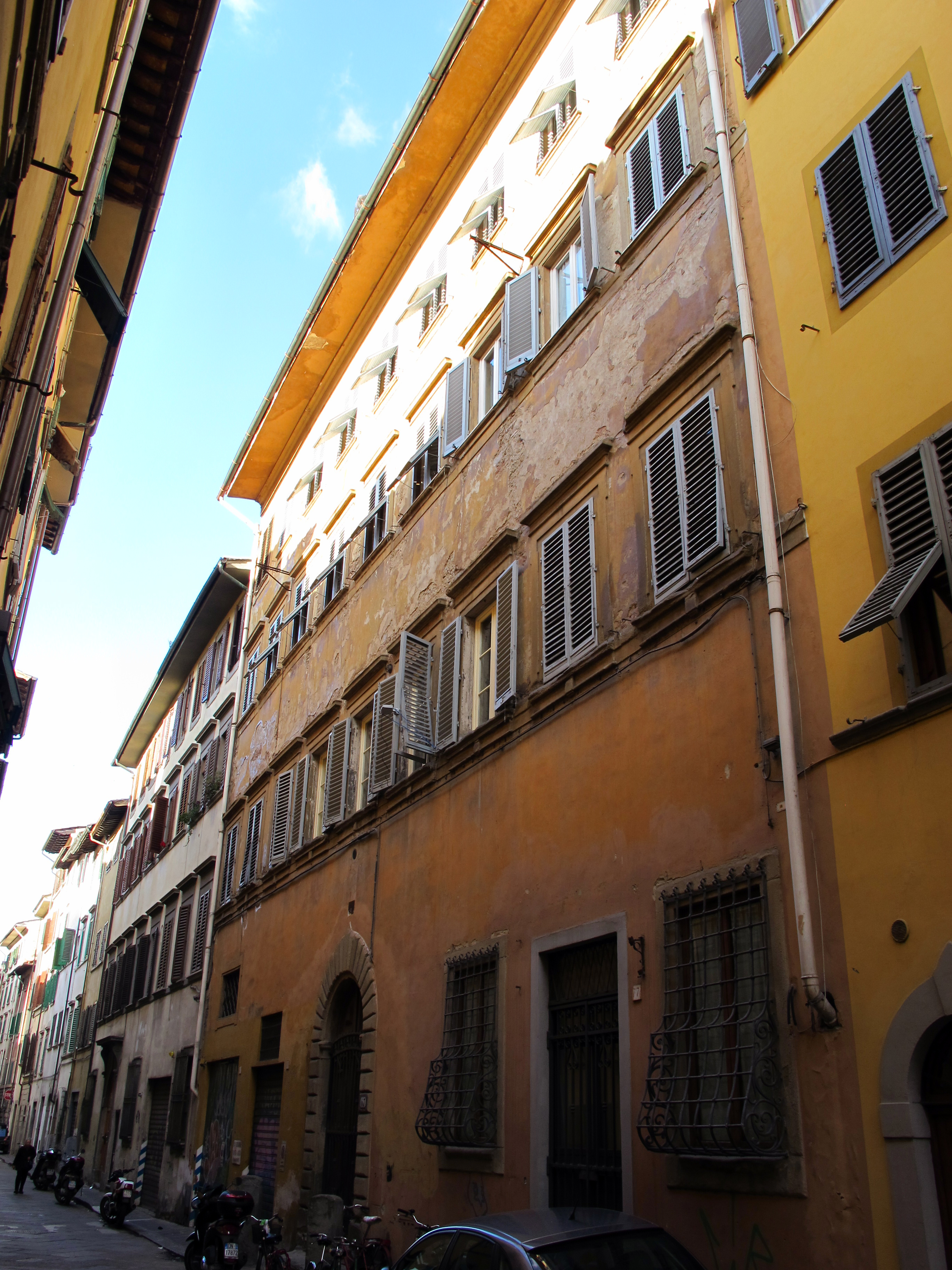
Facade on Via de' Pepi

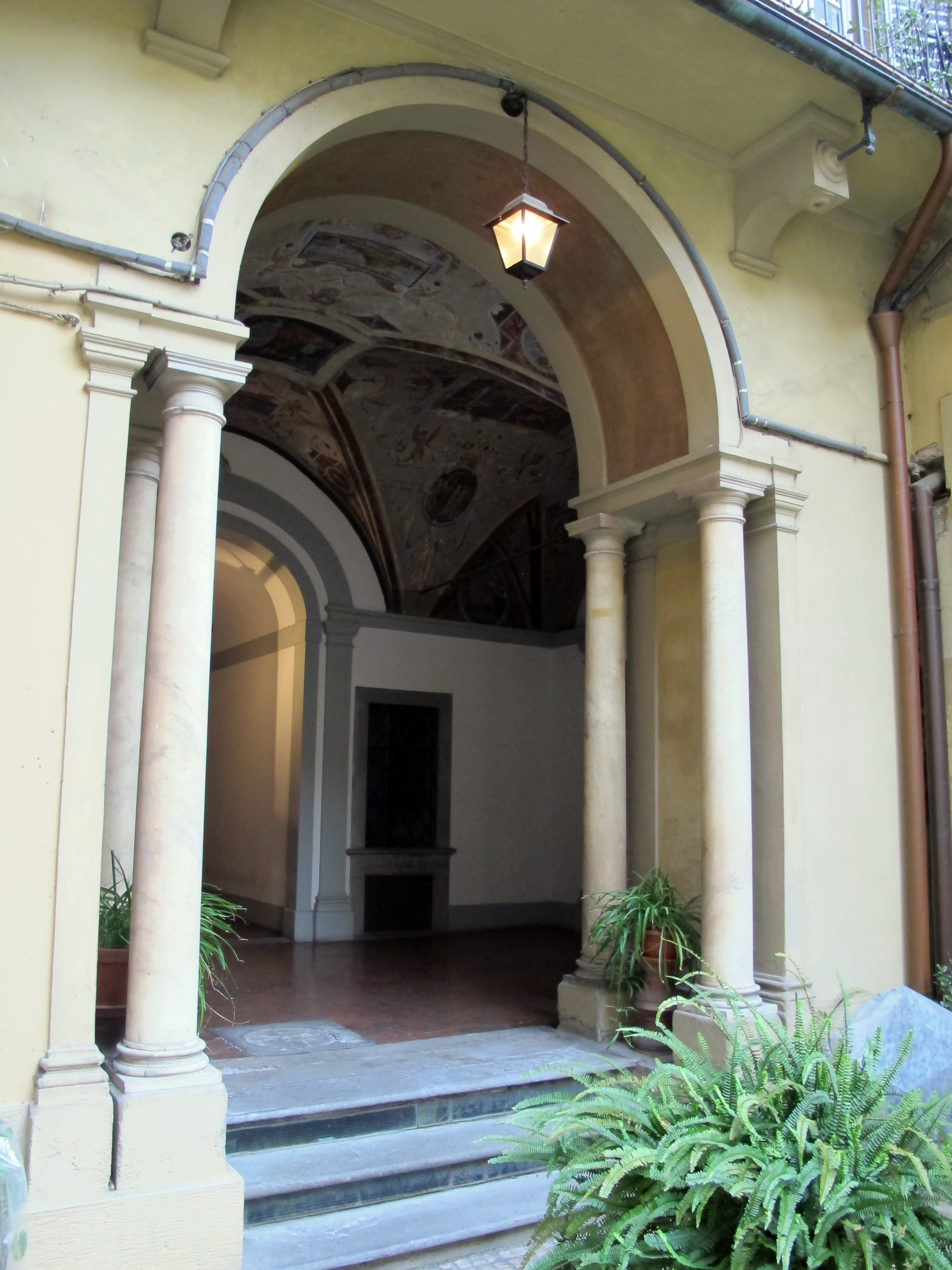
Androne

== Bibliography ==
=== Italian sources ===
- Piero Bargellini, Ennio Guarnieri, Le strade di Firenze, 4 voll., Firenze, Bonechi, 1977–1978, I, 1977, p. 355; III, 1978, p. 54;
- Gabriella Orefice, Da Ponte Vecchio a S. Croce. Piani di risanamento a Firenze, Firenze, Alinea, 1992, pp. 26–27;
- Claudio Paolini, Case e palazzi nel quartiere di Santa Croce a Firenze, Firenze, Paideia, 2008, p. 152, n. 231; p. 88, n. 119;
- Claudio Paolini, Architetture fiorentine. Case e palazzi nel quartiere di Santa Croce, Firenze, Paideia, 2009, p. 221, n. 314; p. 144, n. 188.
