= Palazzo Turchi di Bagno =

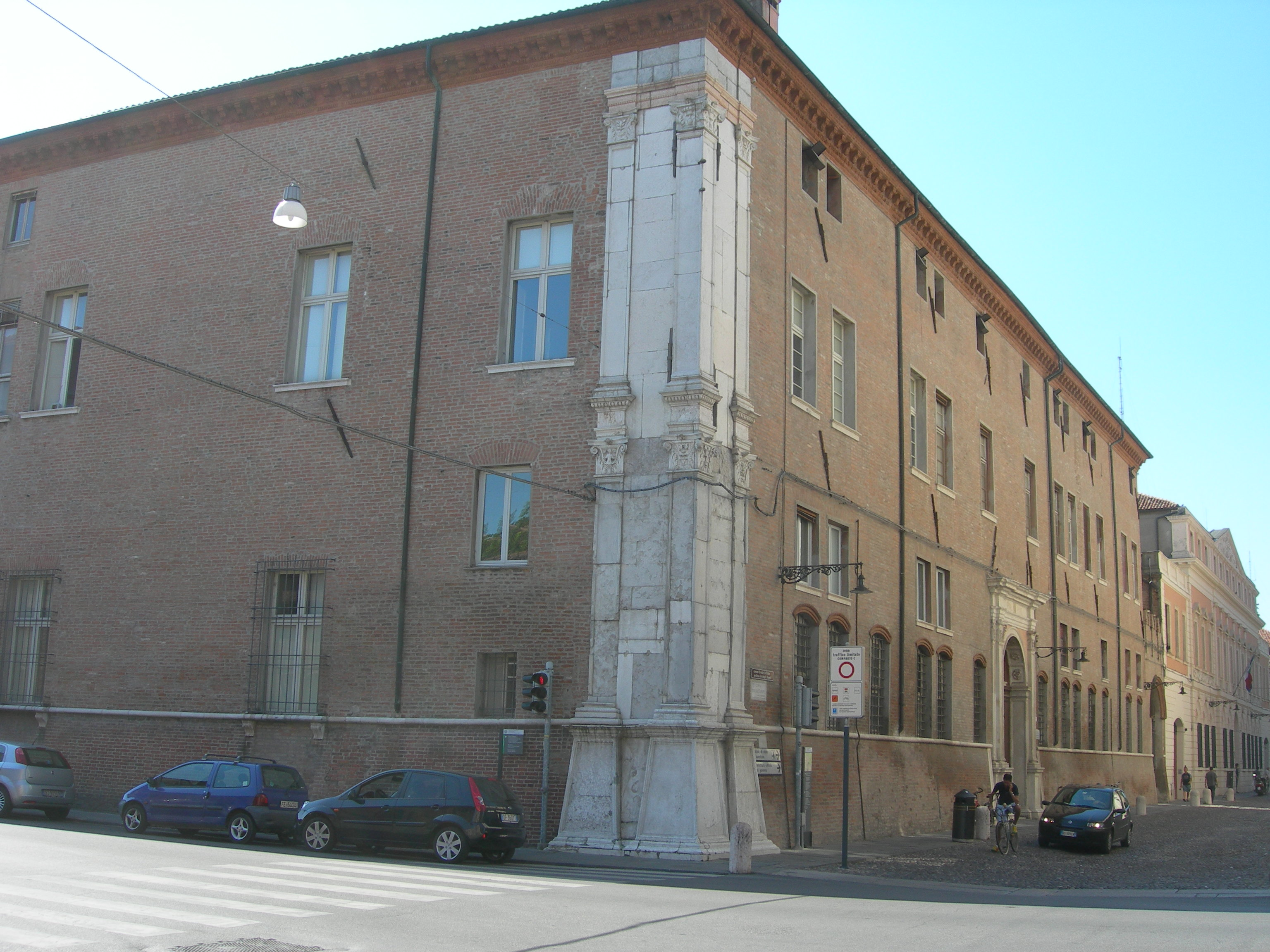
- Palazzo Turchi - Di Bagno
- Interactive map of the Palazzo Turchi di Bagno area

General information
- Status: In use
- Type: Palace
- Architectural style: Renaissance architecture
- Location: Ferrara, Italy, 32, Corso Ercole I d'Este
- Coordinates: 44.842167°N 11.621486°E
- Current tenants: University headquarters
- Construction started: 1498
- Completed: 1499

The Palazzo Turchi di Bagno is a historical palace in Ferrara at Corso Ercole I d'Este 32.

== History ==
It was designed around 1492 by the architect Biagio Rossetti as part of the grandiose urban planning work known as the Addizione Erculea to create the Quadrivio degli Angeli. The other monumental buildings that make up the apexes of the crossroads are the palazzo dei Diamanti and the palazzo Prosperi-Sacrati.

The palace was built starting in 1498 and the work was partly supervised directly by Duke Ercole I d'Este before selling it to Aldobrandino Turchi, exponent of the Giocoli Turchi lineage, a collateral branch descending from the Giocoli.

The palace was ceded to the military in 1933 and heavily damaged by bombing during World War II. It was later renovated and used as a university and museum building. It has housed the Botanical Garden of the University of Ferrara in the garden since 1962 and in 1964 the then Institute of Geology was transferred there, later becoming the seat of the Department of Biology and Evolution and the Museum of Palaeontology and Prehistory Piero Leonardi.

== Description ==
The architectural structure does not enjoy any particular decoration and follows a rather linear perspective, built with bricks and characterised by the only notable element, the parastas angular white stone with a double order of Corinthian capitals. Also part of the original construction are the entrance portal and the decorated terracotta cornice.

== See also ==
- Palazzo Contrari

== Bibliography ==
=== Italian sources ===
- Carlo Bassi (2015). Ferrara rara. Perché Ferrara è bella. Cernobbio: Archivio Cattaneo editore in Cernobbio.
- Gerolamo Melchiorri (2009). Carlo Bassi (ed.). Nomenclatura ed etimologia delle piazze e strade di Ferrara e Ampliamenti. Ferrara: 2G Editrice.
- Bruno Zevi (2006). Saper vedere la città. Ferrara di Biagio Rossetti, «la prima città moderna europea». Torino: Biblioteca Einaudi.
- Marcello Toffanello, Ferrara. La città rinascimentale e il delta del Po, Roma, 2005, p. 91.
