= Palazzo Giulio d'Este =

Coordinates: 44.8408°N 11.6210°E

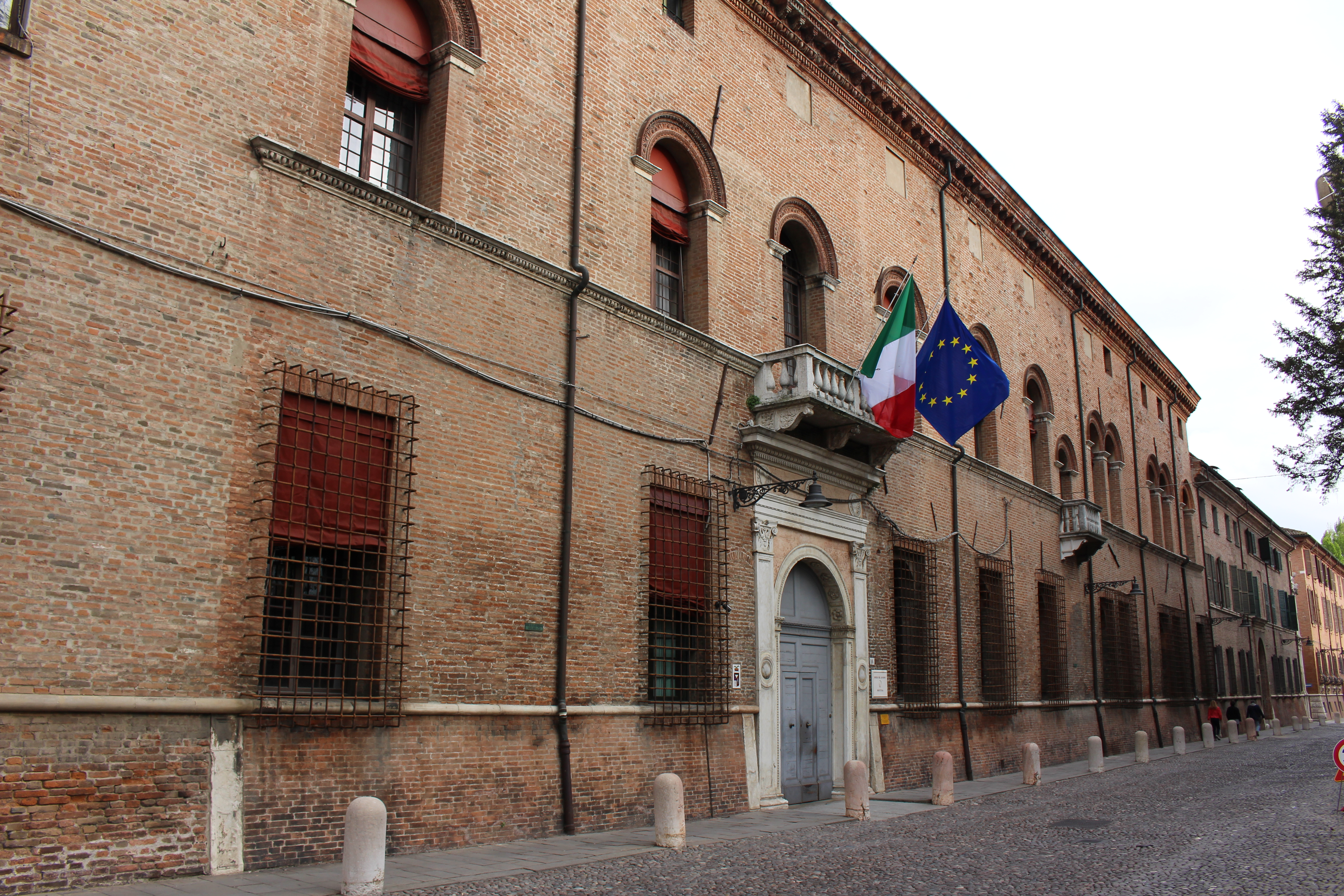
Palace of Giulio d'Este, Ferrara

The Palazzo di Giulio d'Este is a palace located on Corso Ercole I d'Este #16 in Ferrara, Italy.

== History ==
Design of the palace is attributed to Biagio Rossetti, and it was constructed during the years after the decree of the Addizione Erculea in 1494. The palace belonged to Giulio, illegitimate son of Ercole I, who was jailed after participating in 1506 in the conspiracy to overthrow Alfonso I. The palace became property of one of the enemies of Giulio, Cardinal Ippolito d'Este. It later passed to the lords of the Carpi, and then the Pio family of Savoy.

The latter family had the palace decorated with paintings by Ignazio Carbonari, Giovanni Battista dall'Ettore, and Leopoldo Cicognara. In 1918–32, the owners, the Mantovani family, restructured the courtyard and erected in the gardens a limonaia (or orangery) said to derive from the delizia estense of Montagnola.

In 2015, it functions a prefect of the town of Ferrara.
