= Palazzo Roverella, Ferrara =

Coordinates: 44.837271°N 11.621903°E

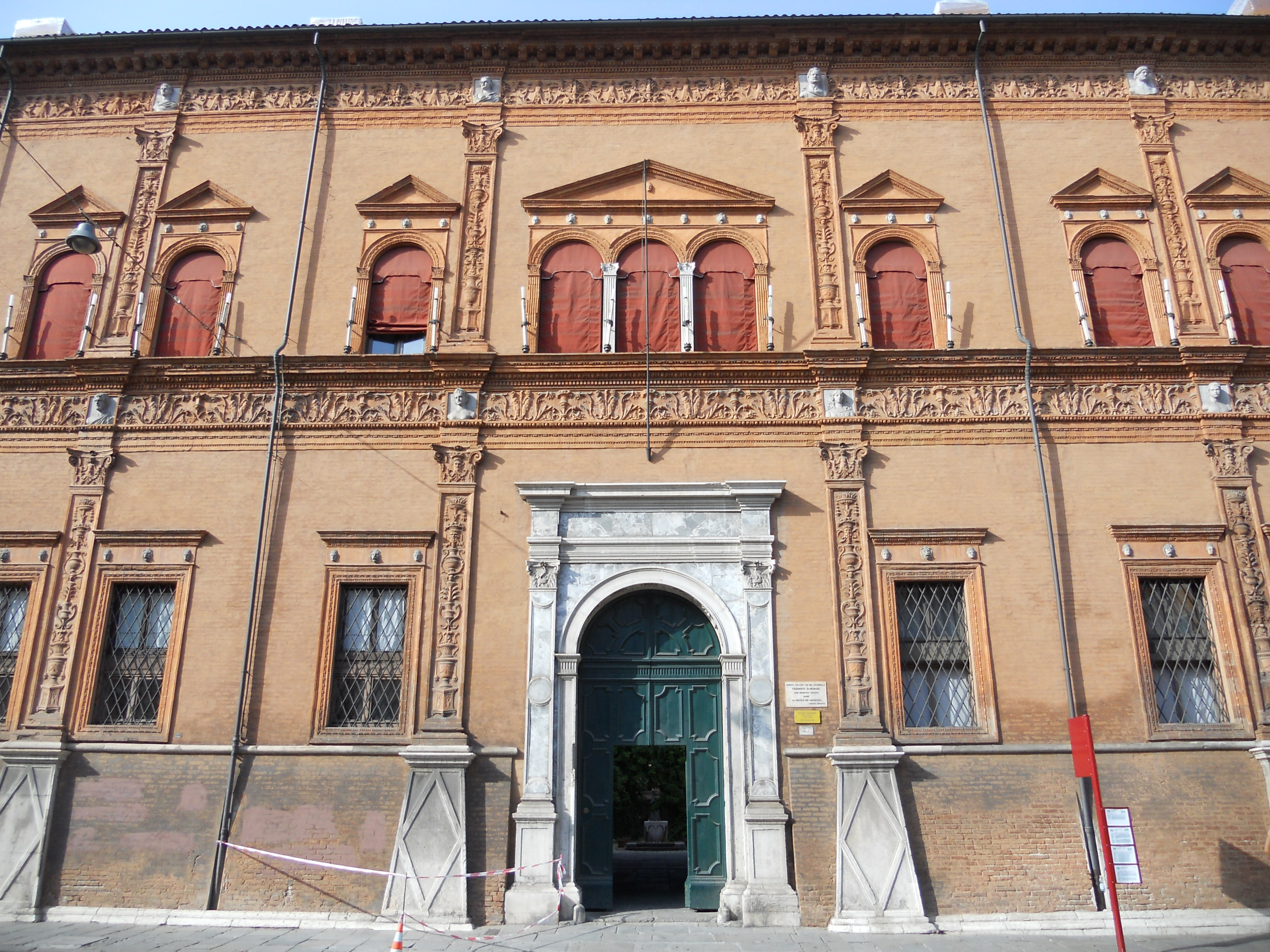

The Palazzo Roverella is a Renaissance-style palace located at the corner of Corso della Giovecca #47, at the intersection with Via Boldini, in Ferrara, Italy.

The design and construction of the palace (1508) is attributed to Biagio Rossetti, as commissioned by Gaetano Magnanini, secretary of Duke Alfonso I d'Este. It is built at the land utilized to build the urban expansion of the Addizione Erculea. The palace became property of the Roverella family in the 19th century. The varying rhythm of placement of the windows; and the grotteschi-decorated terra-cotta pilasters with geometric marble bases, give the facade an early-Mannerist-style. Above the pilasters are relief busts.

The palace should not be confused with a Palazzo Roverella, Rovigo, also attributed to Rossetti, and which now serves as the town painting gallery.

== See also ==
- Palazzo Contrari
