= Palazzo Prosperi-Sacrati =

Coordinates: 44.8426°N 11.6213°E

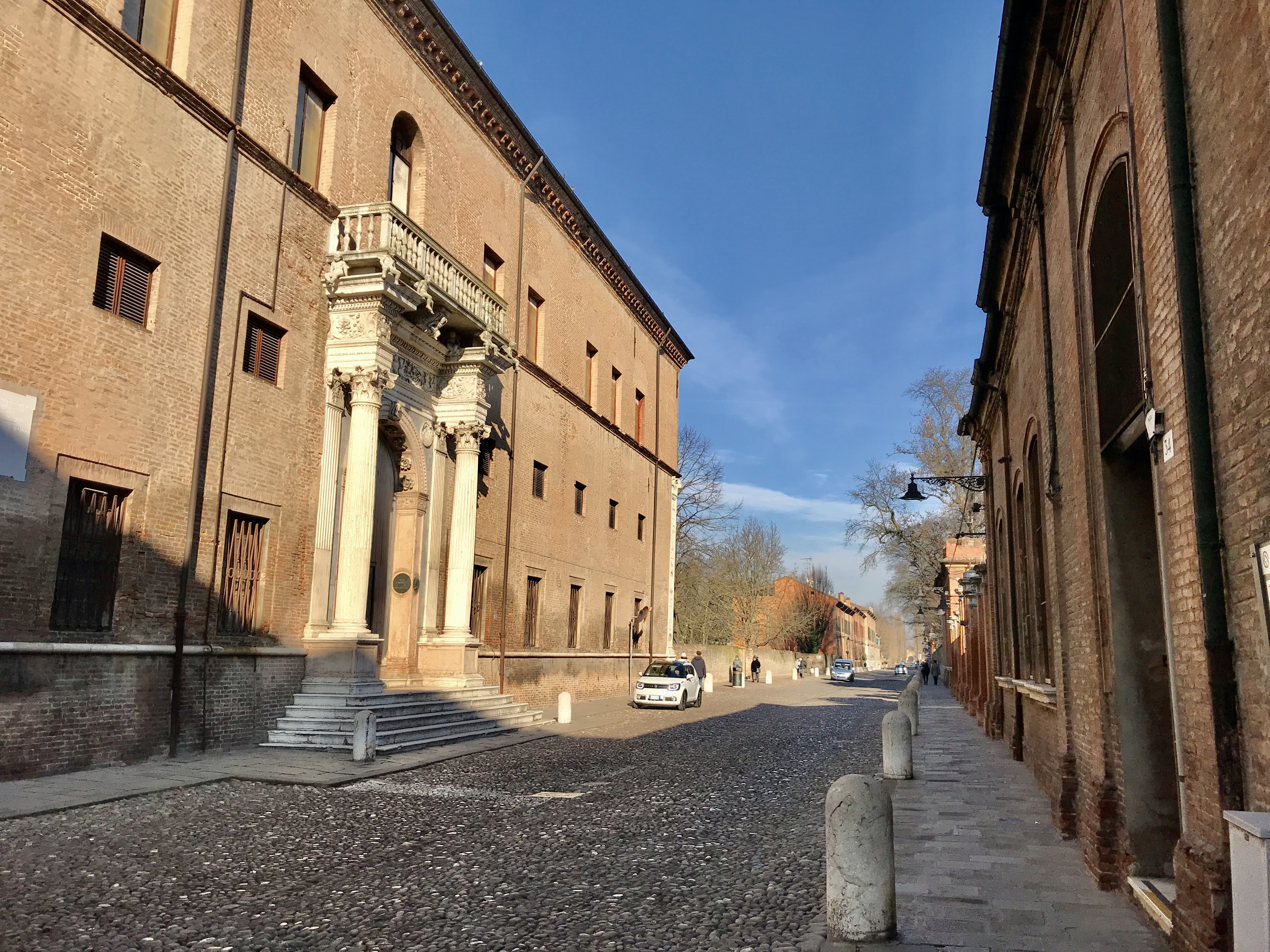
Facade of palace.

Palazzo Prosperi-Sacrati is a Renaissance-style palace located on Corso Ercole I d'Este in Ferrara, region of Emilia Romagna, Italy. The palace with its protruding marble portal and balcony, and with a corner balcony and pilaster on the corner with Corso Biagio Rossetti, was designed and built in 1493–1498 by Biagio Rossetti as part of the Addizione Erculea. It is flanked on the ground floor by marble pilasters. It is across the Corso Rossetti from the lateral facade of the Palazzo dei Diamanti.

== Gallery ==
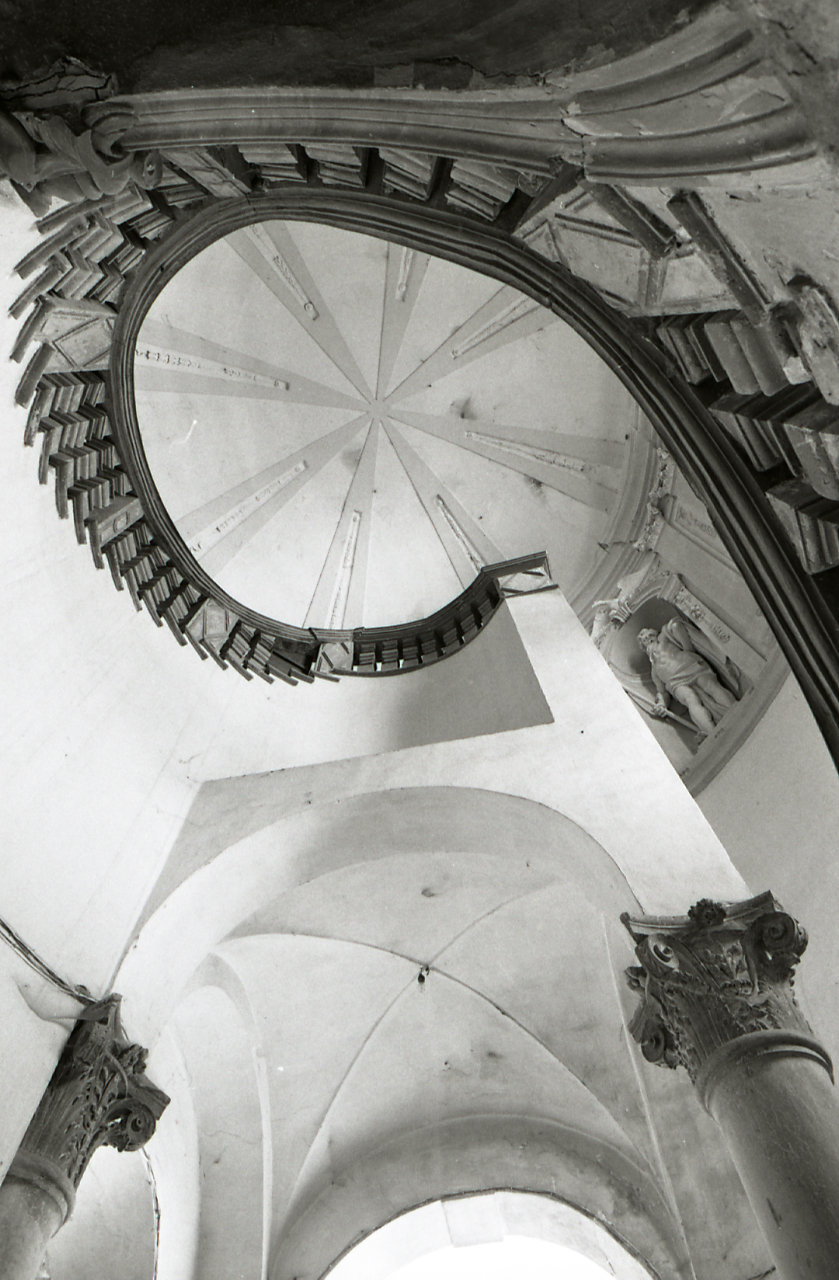
Interior. Photo by Paolo Monti, 1981

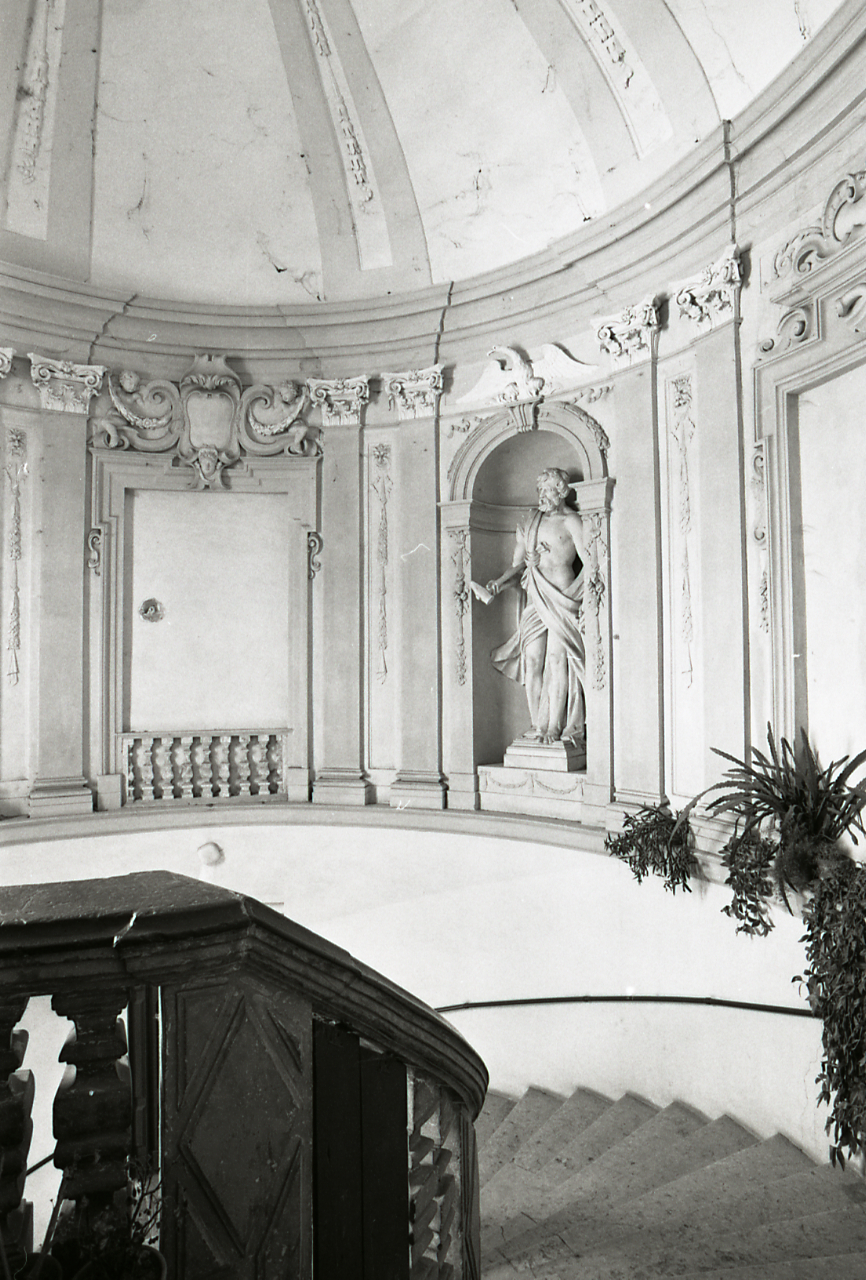
Details of the staircase. Photo by Paolo Monti, 1981
