= Palazzo Contrari =

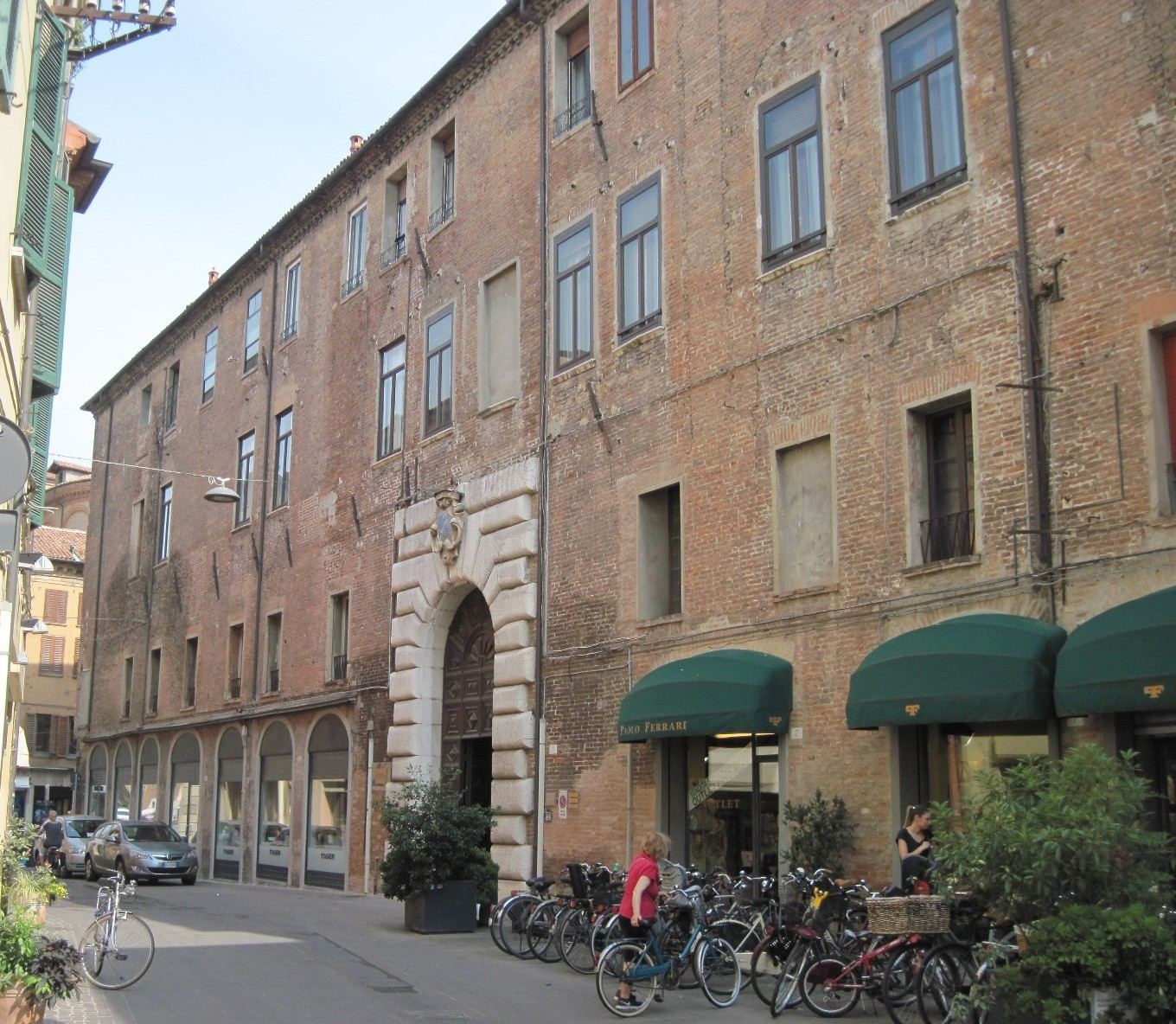
- Palazzo Contrari - Ferrara
- Interactive map of the Palazzo Contrari area

General information
- Status: In use
- Type: Palace
- Architectural style: Renaissance architecture, Gothic architecture
- Location: Ferrara, Italy, 5, via Contrari
- Coordinates: 44.834878°N 11.62169°E
- Construction started: XIVth century
- Renovated: 1434

The Palazzo Contrari is a building of mediaeval origin located in Ferrara in Via Contrari (named after the ancient and noble Contrari family), at no. 5, in the city centre, next to the Palazzo di San Crispino.

Via Contrari is a parallel to via Mazzini, once the main thoroughfare of the Jewish Ghetto, Ghetto di Ferrara.

== History ==
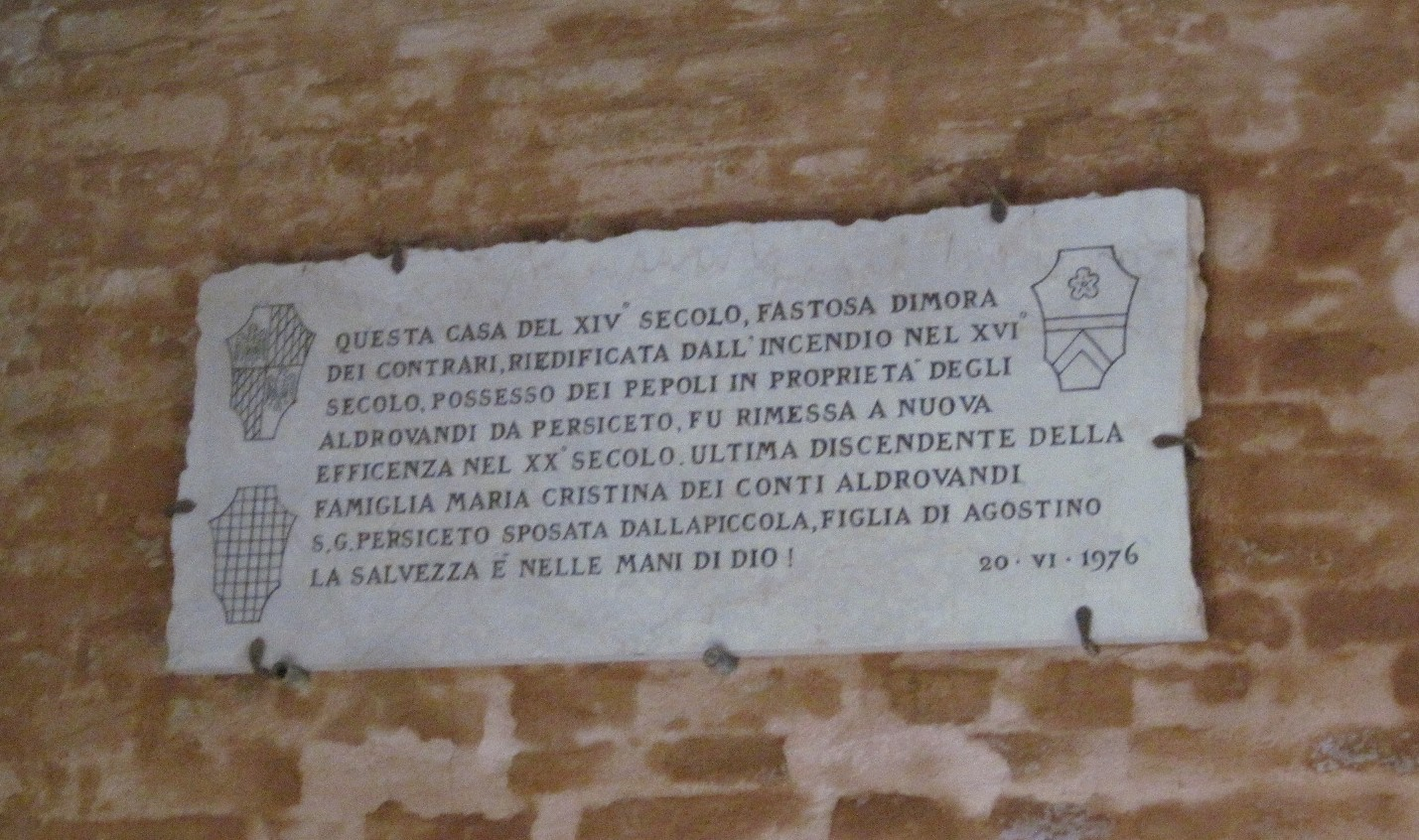
Epigraph in the atrium of Palazzo Contrari, Ferrara

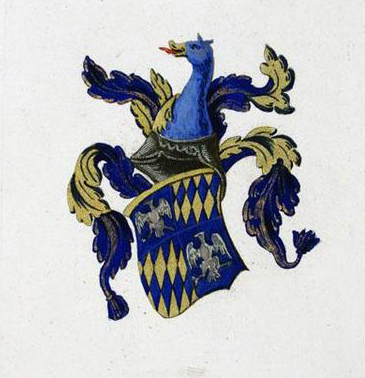
Contrari family coat of arms

The Contrari family was one of the richest and most important in Ferrara from the 12th century, very close and related to the Estensi.

One of the first members of the family to hold public office was Pietro Contrari, Consul of Ferrara from 1127 to 1135 and the most prominent personality was the 3rd Count of Vignola Uguccione II, deceased in 1516 (consort of Diana d'Este, daughter of Sigismondo I d'Este), who among his other duties and titles was lieutenant of the Duchy of Ferrara and captain general of the duke's armies.

The Contrari family was also related to the lords of Carpi, the Pio di Savoia, feudal lords of the Este, because Lionello I Pio di Savoia married Camilla Contrari, from Ferrara.

In addition to Uguccione, Count Ercole Contrari, captain of the ducal guard who had a long relationship with Lucrezia d'Este, also lived in the palace from 1413. On the count's death the property passed to the Pepoli family, until 1855, and finally the palace was divided among several families.

== Architectural aspects ==
The building, dating from before the 14th century, was initially equipped with battlements that collapsed during the Ferrara earthquake of 1570. It was later modified, but retains a monumental appearance, thanks in part to the beautiful rusticated marble portal that recalls other noble residences such as the Delizia del Verginese or the Ducal Baths.

In the large rooms the ceilings are coffered and finished with gold and fine figures. Throughout the building, there are many friezes dating back to the time of its construction.

== See also ==
- Palazzo Turchi di Bagno

== Bibliography ==
=== Italian sources ===
- Francesco Scafuri, Alla ricerca della Ferrara perduta, Ferrara, Faust Edizioni, 2015, ISBN 978-88-98147-34-2.
- Gerolamo Melchiorri, Nomenclatura ed etimologia delle piazze e strade di Ferrara e Ampliamenti, a cura di Carlo Bassi, Ferrara, 2G Editrice, 2009, ISBN 978-88-89248-21-8.
- Michele Russo, Il palazzo del Verginese: una delizia estense nascosta, Roma, Sapienza Università Editrice, 2018, SBN IT\ICCU\RMS\2897289.
- Loreno Confortini, Debora Dameri, Achille Lodovisi e Giuseppe Trenti, Stemmi e impresse della Rocca di Vignola, Vignola, Fondazione di Vignola, 2008, ISBN 88-7866-012-4.
