= Addizione Erculea =

Coordinates: 44.84241322°N 11.62153698°E

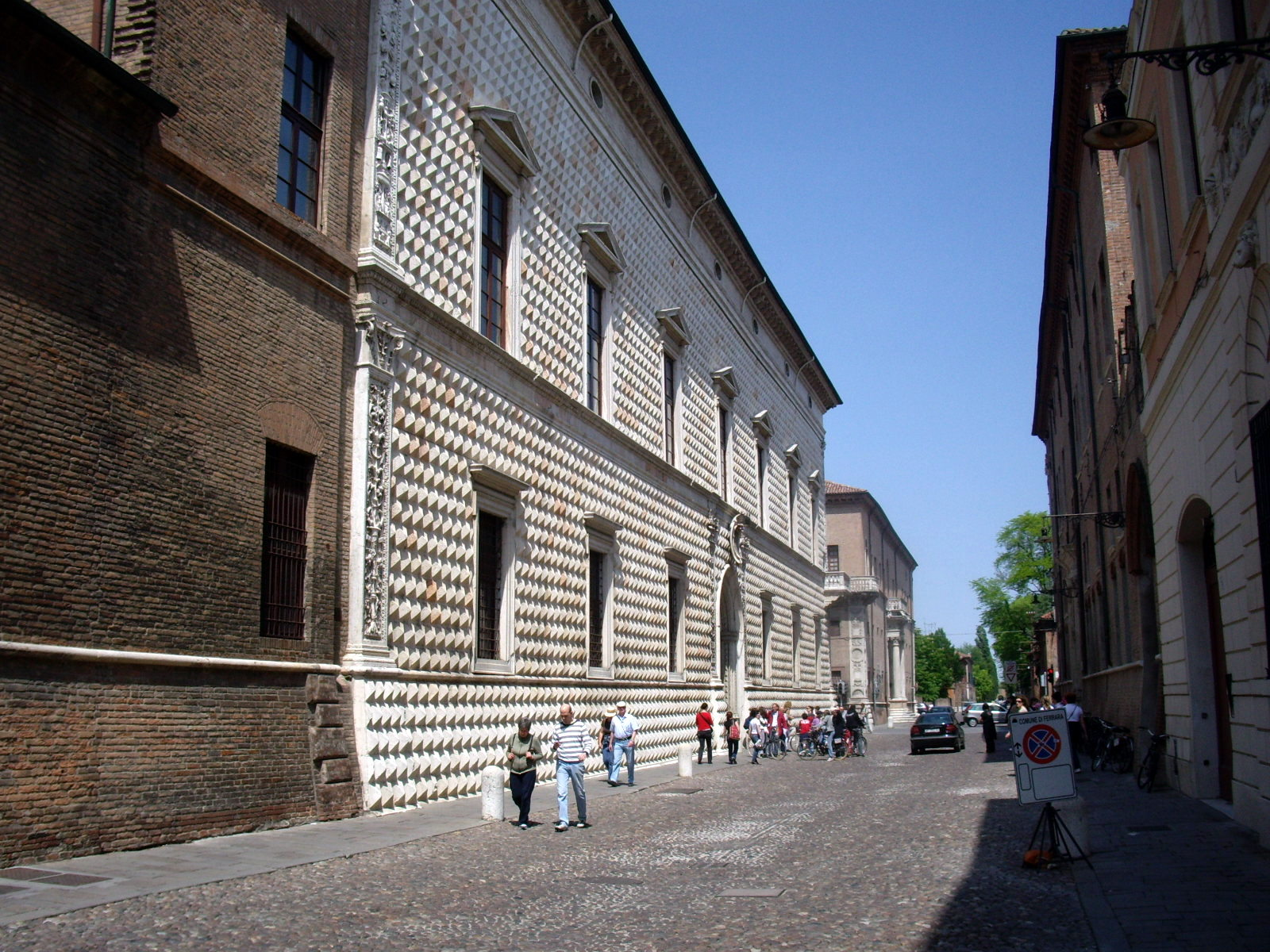
A street near the Palazzo dei Diamanti

The Addizione Erculea or Erculean Addition is the area of urban expansion created in 1492 by the enlargement of the walled city limits of Ferrara, Italy. It is celebrated as an example of Renaissance urban planning.

The walled medieval city of Ferrara was geographically limited from southward expansion by a branch of the delta of the Po river. In 1450, the prior Duke, Borso d'Este (1450) had enlarged slightly the city southward with reclaimed land from the river banks.

However, Ercole d'Este had suffered from attacks and sieges from Venice to the north and the Papal states to the South. In 1492, in order to accommodate the burgeoning city and create a more daunting city-fortress to withstand sieges, Ercole d'Este commissioned plans from the architect Biagio Rossetti for an urban expansion north of the city. The walls at this border coincided with the north flank of the Castello Estense. These walls were razed and the moat, present Corso Giovecca, was filled in. Unlike the dense haphazard tracks of the medieval center, the Addizione created a main east-west road (analogous to a Decumanus Maximus) represented now by Corso Porta Po, Biagio Rosetti, and Porta Mare; and north-south street (analogous to a Cardo Maximus) represented by the now Corso Ercole I d'Este parting from the Castello.

The Addizione more than doubled the size of the walled town and included areas for cultivation and private parks (now encompassed by the Cemetery of the Certosa and the Jewish cemetery). Among the buildings erected over the next decades and centuries in this sector were the Palazzina di Marfisa d'Este, the church of Santa Chiara, Palazzo Roverella; the Palazzo Prosperi-Sacrati; the church of Teatini; the church of San Carlo, and the 17th century Teatro Comunale.

The walls of Ferrara once spanned 13 kilometers, some 9 kilometers still stand, mainly to the north and east of the city. The Porta degli Angeli was an original Northern entrance to the Addizione Erculea.
