= Biagio Rossetti =

Italian architect

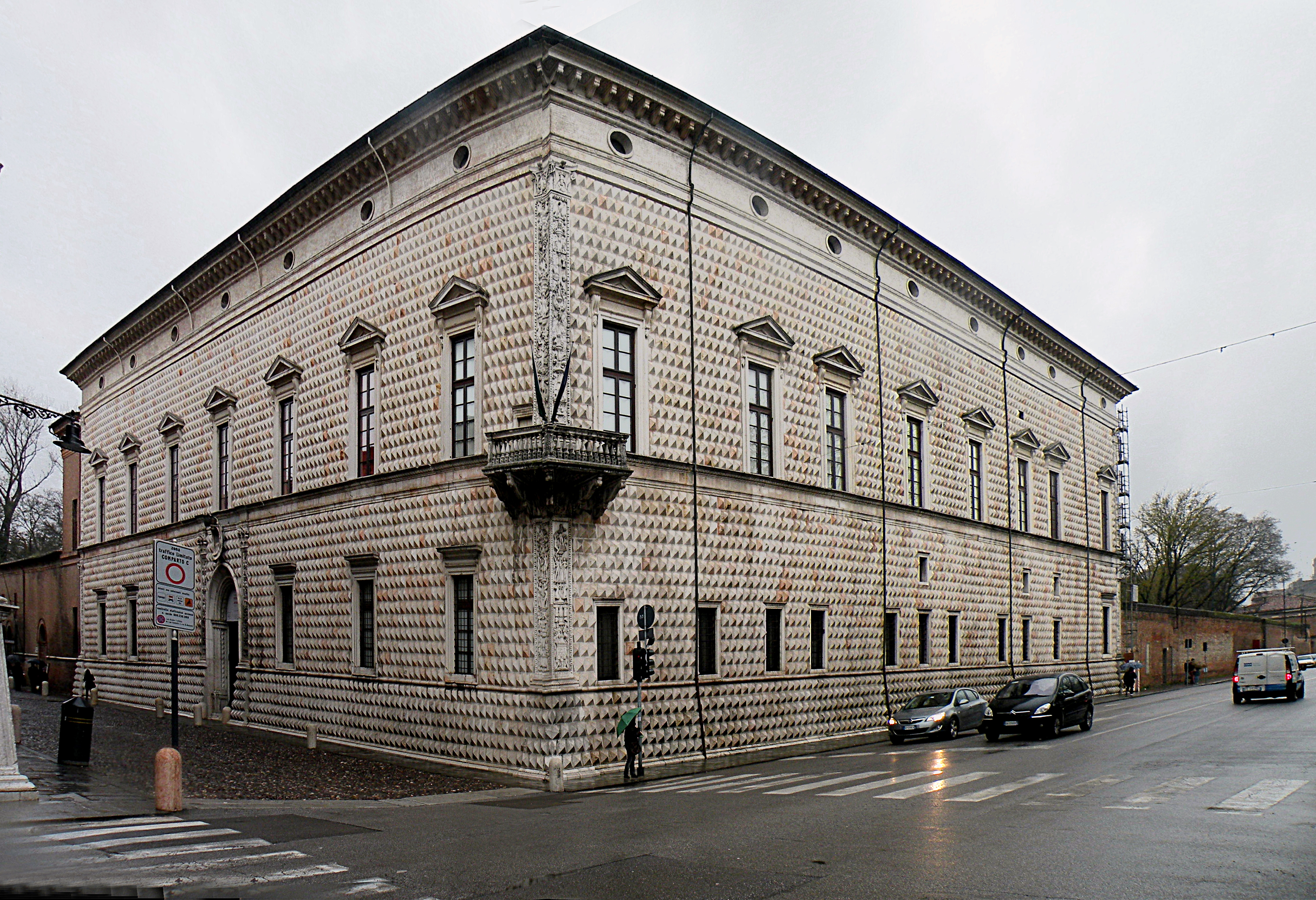
The Palazzo dei Diamanti in the Renaissance district of Ferrara

Biagio Rossetti (c. 1447 – 1516) was an Italian architect and urbanist from Ferrara. A military engineer since 1483 and the ducal architect of Ercole I d'Este, Rossetti was assigned, in 1492, the project of enlarging the city of Ferrara.

Rossetti is considered the first architect in the history of urbanistics to make use of the advantages of modern methods: balancing the humanistic principles in architecture, the real needs of the city, and local traditions. Beginning in 1492, he projected and directed the construction of the defence walls around the city. The Diamond Palace is perhaps the most famous of his buildings. The exterior facade is clad in white marble blocks carved into diamond shapes ("bugnato a punta di diamante").

After Ercole's death in 1505, Rossetti served the Cardinal Ippolito d'Este, in which role he was responsible for the creation of many notable palazzi and churches. Among the latter, he helped design Santa Maria in Vado.

== Sources ==
- Marcianò, Ada Francesca (1991). L'età di Biagio Rossetti. Rinascimenti di casa d'Este. Ferrara-Rome.
- Zevi, Bruno (1960). Biagio Rossetti architetto ferrarese. Il primo urbanista moderno europeo. Turin.
