= Casa Grondona =

Historic building in Milan, Italy

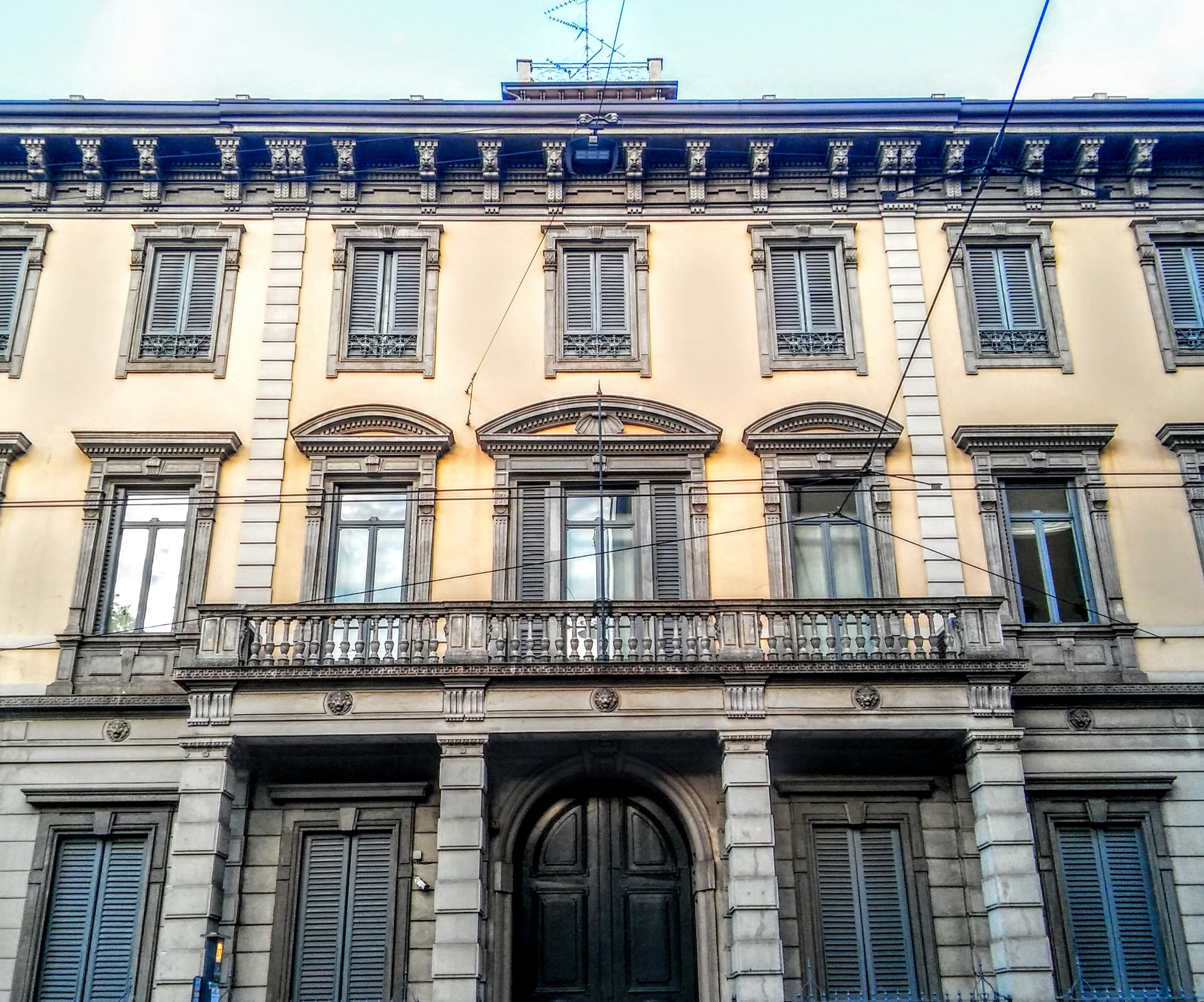
- Central bays of façade

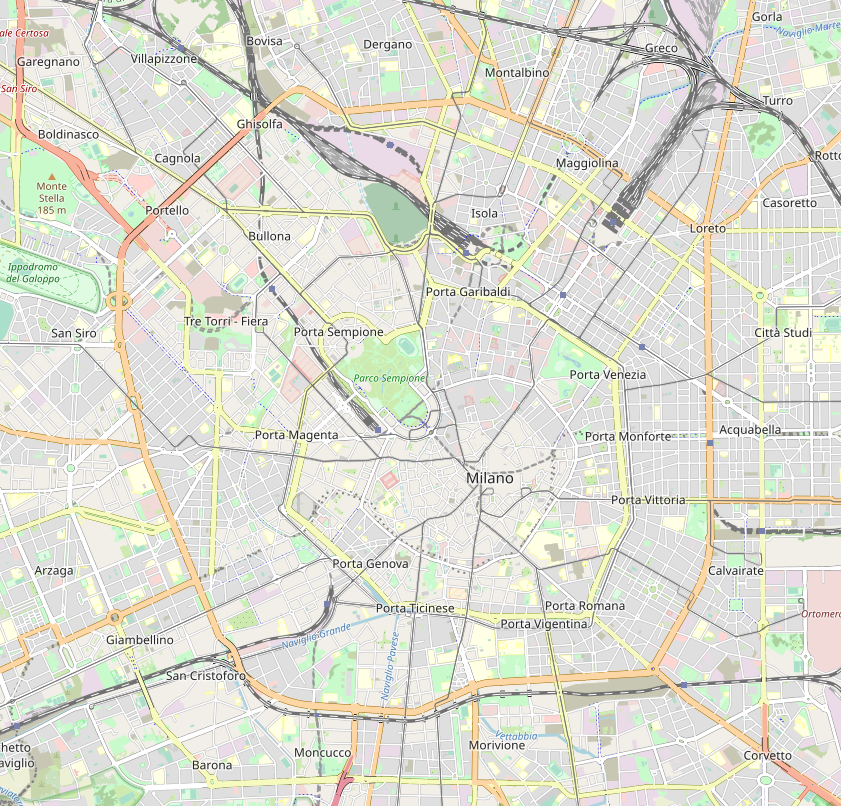
- Location within Milan Location within Italy

General information
- Architectural style: Renaissance Revival architecture
- Location: Corso Italia 47, Milan, Italy
- Coordinates: 45.45306°N 9.18700°E
- Completed: 1876

Design and construction
- Architect: Enrico Terzaghi

Casa Grondona is a historic building at Corso Italia 47 in central Milan, Italy.

== History ==
The palace was commissioned by Felice Grondona, a wealthy industrialist, who employed the architect Enrico Terzaghi. Designed in a Neo-Renaissance style, the building was completed in 1876.

== Description ==
The ground floor is made from rectangular blocks of stone; it has protruding porticos supporting three balconies. An interlaced frieze separates the ground and first floor. The facade has little decoration, consisting of repeated lion-face masks in roundels and on the brackets supporting the roof.
