= Palazzo Pendaglia =

Coordinates: 44.8357°N 11.6232°E

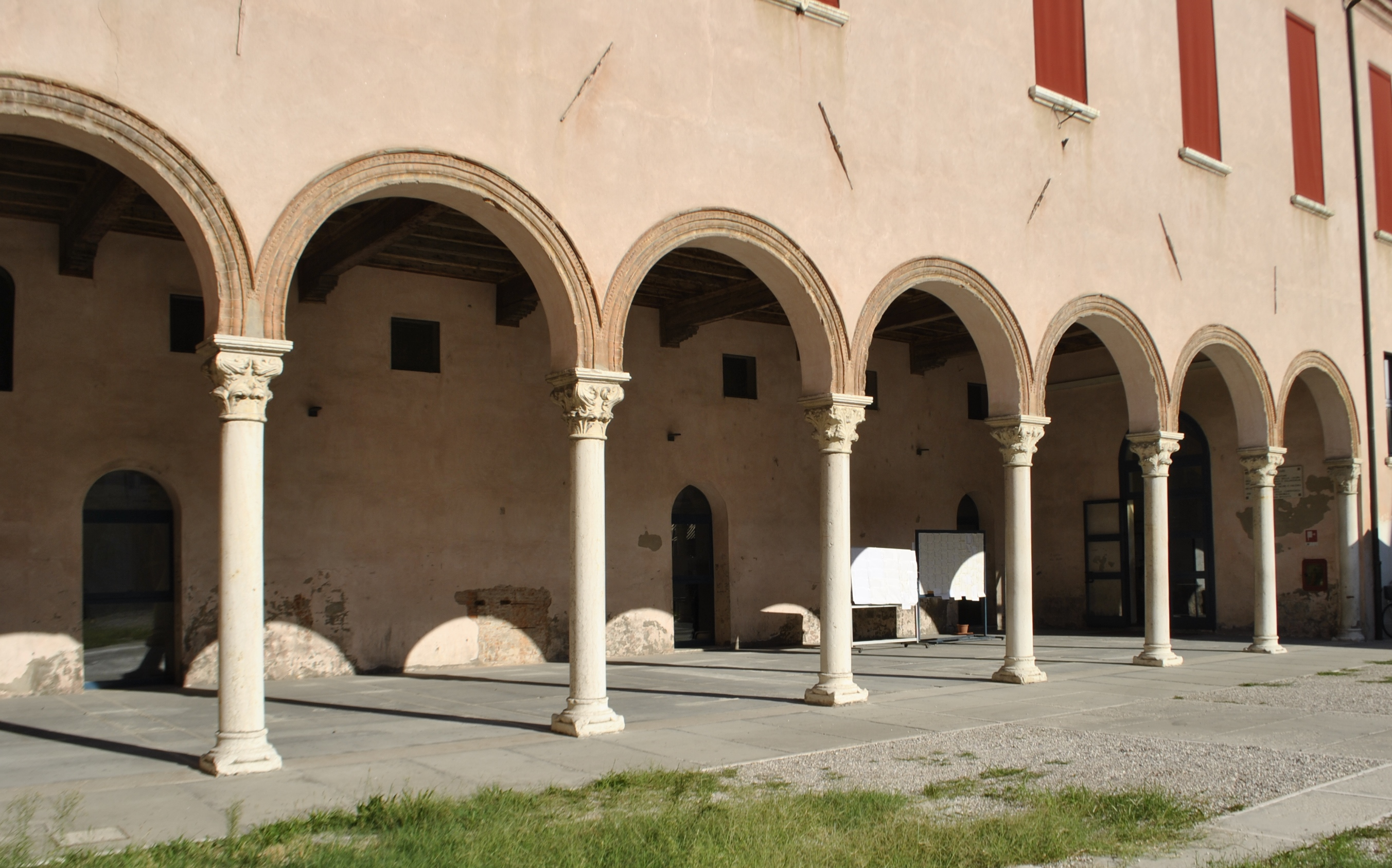
Loggia of the Palazzo Pendaglia

The Palazzo Pendaglia is a 15th-century, Gothic-style palace located at Via Sogari #3, in Ferrara, Italy. In 2015, it houses an institute for training restaurant and hotel staff (Istituto Alberghiero "Orio Vergani").

Commissioned by the aristocratic Pendaglia family, in the 18th century it became property of the commune. During the Napoleonic era, it served as barracks, but has served as dormitory, nursing home, and school. The building has suffered from fires and demolitions, but still maintains some 15th-century frescoes and decoration. The sober brick facade has an ogival portal.

== Bibliography ==
- Maria Teresa Sambin De Norcen (2012). Il cortigiano architetto. Edilizia, politica, umanesimo nel Quattrocento ferrarese. Venezia: Marsilio. ISBN 978-88-317-1341-2.
