= Palazzo Puccini, Pistoia =

Coordinates: 43.9333°N 10.9174°E

The Palazzo Puccini is a former aristocratic palace located at Via Can Bianco in central Pistoia, Tuscany, Italy. The palace is now used as a boutique guest house/residence.

== Description ==
The Renaissance-style facade is simple with stone portals and window frames. The corners also betray rusticated stone elements. While acquired by the ancient Puccini family in the 17th century, however, the palace was refurbished in the 18th century, including frescoes by Luigi Mecherini. The Puccini included a number of prominent art collectors and philanthropists. Puccino di Fortino di Puccino was gonfalonieri of Pistoia in 1339. Fra Puccio Puccino was an Augustinian friar who cared for the townsfolk ill with the plague in 1340. Giuseppe and Tommasso Puccini were professors of Medicine and Anatomy respectively at the University of Pisa. Another Tomasso was a scholar and director of the Uffizi Gallery, and is remembered that during the Napoleonic occupation, for having protected almost all the collection from confiscation. Tomasso's sister Maddalena Puccini was known for her support of the hospitals of the convalescing, while her son, Niccolò, who was the last of the family in the 19th century, endowed all his goods to the local orphanage or the city. Up to his day, the palace had a prominent collection of artworks, subsequently moved to Villa Puccini in Scornio.
