= Elsa (river) =

River in Tuscany, Italy; tributary of the Arno

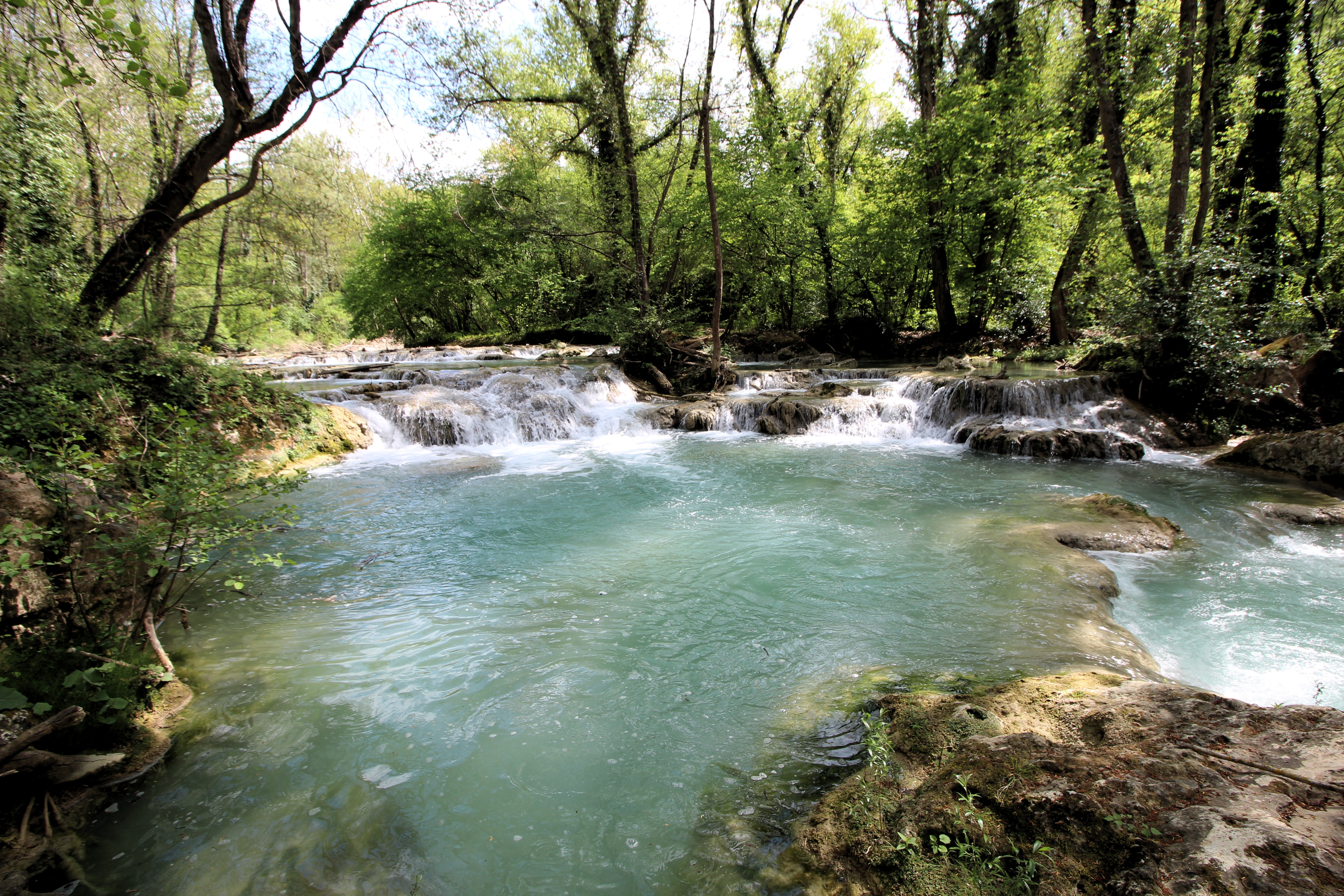
- Elsa River

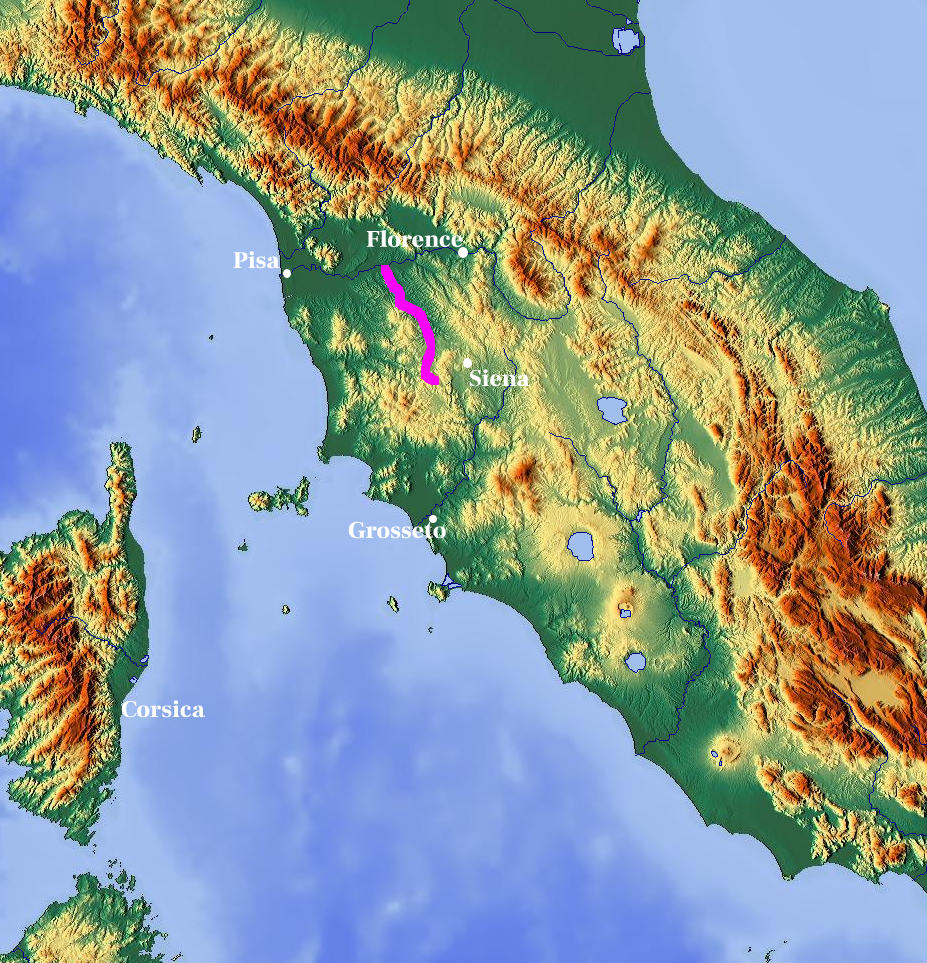
- Map of the Elsa River. Major cities of Tuscany are shown in context.
- Etymology: Etruscan Hèlza, comparable to Helzni-Helzunia 'noble'

Location
- Country: Italy
- Region: Tuscany
- Cities: Colle di Val d'Elsa, Poggibonsi, Certaldo, Castelfiorentino

Physical characteristics
- Source: Molli, Sovicille
  - coordinates: 43°16′49″N 11°11′06″E
  - elevation: 580 m (1,900 ft)
- Mouth: Arno
  - location: Border of frazione Marcignana, Empoli and Isola, San Miniato
  - coordinates: 43°43′09″N 10°52′38″E
  - elevation: 22 m (72 ft)
- Length: 75 km (47 mi)
- Basin size: 867 km^{2} (335 sq mi)

Basin features
- Progression: Arno→ Tyrrhenian Sea

The Elsa (Italian pronunciation: [ˈelsa]) is a river in the Italian region of Tuscany. It is 63 km (39 mi) long. It flows northward to empty into the left bank of the Arno. From its source at Molli, Sovicille, the flow of the river is low until its reaches its major tributaries at Le Vene di Onci and Le Caldane, in Colle di Val d'Elsa. The mouth of the river divides the frazione Marcignana, of Empoli and Isola, of San Miniato. The basin of the Elsa has been continuously inhabited since at least the time of the Etruscan civilization.

The Elsa basin is located between Montagnola Senese and the rolling hills of Chianti, roughly corresponding to the eponymous valley, Valdelsa. Catchments are predominantly fan shaped. It flows through several municipalities in the Metropolitan City of Florence and the province of Siena.

The Elsa is referenced in Dante Alighieri's Divine Comedy.

== Route ==
The first stretch of the river, fed almost exclusively by rainwater, flows across the Piano della Speranza and Pian dell'Olmino plains, within the municipalities of Casole d'Elsa and Colle di Val d'Elsa, and is known as the Elsa morta (Dead Elsa).

It is joined by waters from the Botro degli Strulli stream, which descends from Mensanello, as well as by the waters from Le Caldane springs.

Located just before Gracciano dell'Elsa, a populous district of the municipality of Colle di Val d'Elsa, Le Caldane are warm-water springs that have been renowned since ancient times for their therapeutic properties.

At Onci, near Gracciano dell'Elsa, the Elsa finally becomes the Elsa Viva (Living Elsa), thanks to the influx of water from Le Vene springs, which once powered mills and paper mills.

Shortly after Gracciano dell'Elsa, the river reaches the San Marziale Bridge, together with the Steccaia weir and the Callone Reale sluice gate. From here begin the gore, an ancient network of canals that supplied inexpensive hydraulic power to the mills, paper mills, and manufacturing industries of Colle di Val d'Elsa, and to which the town likely owes much of its early industrial development.

Beyond the San Marziale Bridge, where the Sentierelsa trail also begins, the river flows over the Steccaia and forms the Diborrato Waterfall.

The river then passes through Colle di Val d'Elsa, creating several spots along its course.

Near Poggibonsi, the Elsa is joined by the Staggia, Foci, and Drove streams. It then passes the Ulignano weir, where the medieval San Galgano mill once stood, before quickly entering the municipalities of Barberino Val d'Elsa, San Gimignano, and Certaldo, receiving the waters of the Avane, Zambra, Casciani, and Agliena streams.

The Certaldo weir and Certaldo mill also bear witness to the historical use of the river's waters for generating hydraulic power.

The Elsa continues its journey, joined by the Pesciola, Rio Petroso, and Rio del Vallone, until it reaches Castelfiorentino, where it receives the waters of the Lama stream. It then flows past the Dogana weir, once marking the border between Florence and San Miniato, and reaches the Renai, where sand and gravel were once extracted.

The river then continues alongside the railway. After passing Cambiano, it reaches Granaiolo, where its waters once powered a large sugar refinery that operated from the early twentieth century until the 1960s. Beyond Brusciana, the river arrives at Ponte a Elsa. Finally, near Isola, the waters of the Elsa merge into the much larger Arno River.

== Sentierelsa ==
The Sentierelsa is an equipped riverside trail approximately 4 km (2.5 mi) long, located in the municipality of Colle di Val d'Elsa.

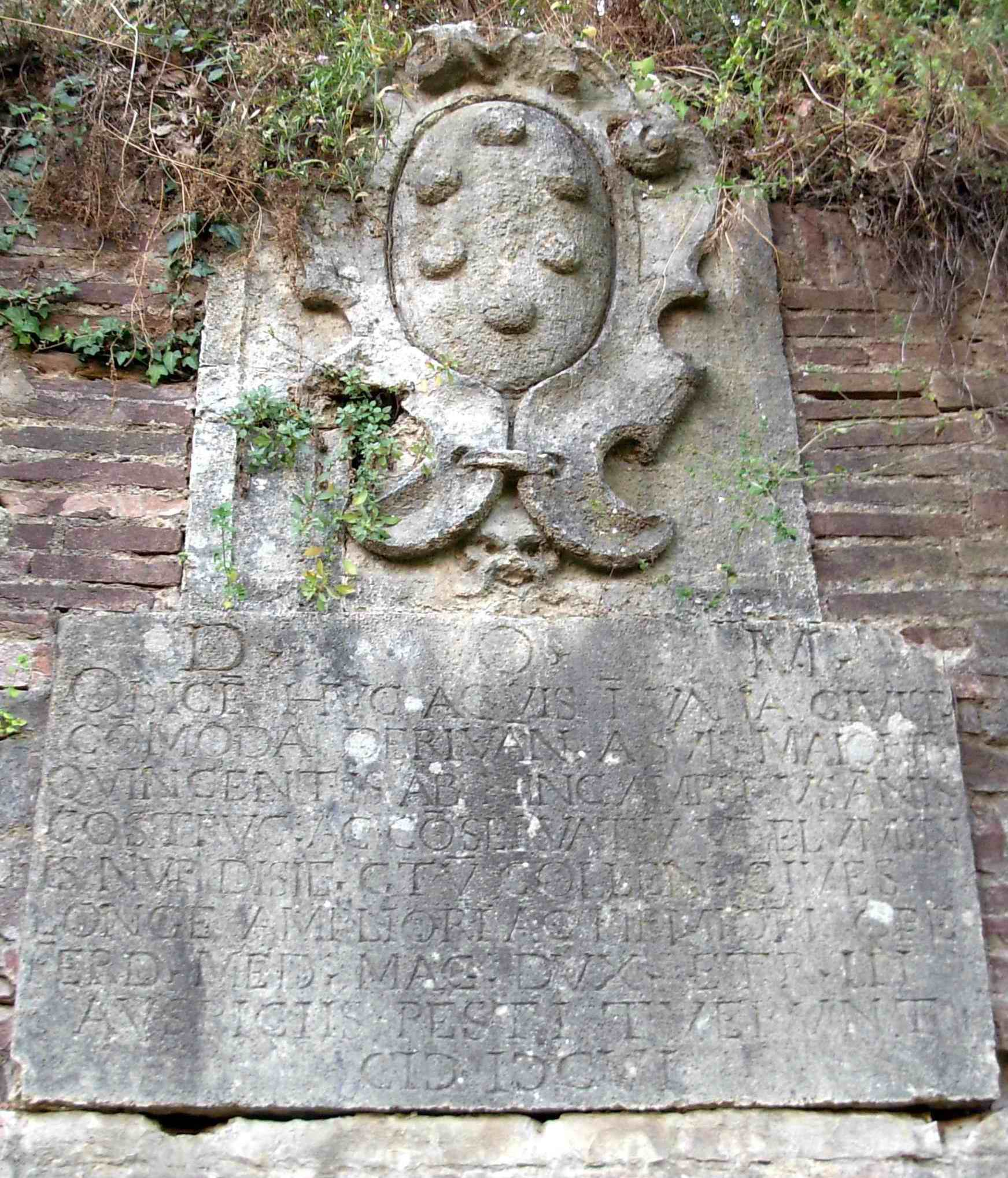
Medici plaque at the Steccaia

The trail begins near the village of Gracciano dell'Elsa, just south of the town of Colle di Val d'Elsa, close to the San Marziale Bridge, and follows the river as far as the Spugna Bridge.

The trail, developed largely through the efforts of volunteers from ARCI Pesca Colligiano, is part of the Alta Val d'Elsa River Park, a protected natural area of local interest.

At the beginning of the trail are the Steccaia weir and the Callone Reale sluice gate. These two structures played a fundamental role in the economic history of Colle di Val d'Elsa, as they diverted the waters of the Elsa into artificial canals dating back to the Middle Ages. The diverted water flowed into the gore, the medieval canals that supplied water not only for irrigation and everyday use but, above all, to generate the hydraulic power needed by mills and the many paper mills that once operated in Colle di Val d'Elsa. In later centuries, this inexpensive source of power also supported the development of ironworks and other manufacturing industries, remaining important until the nineteenth and twentieth centuries.

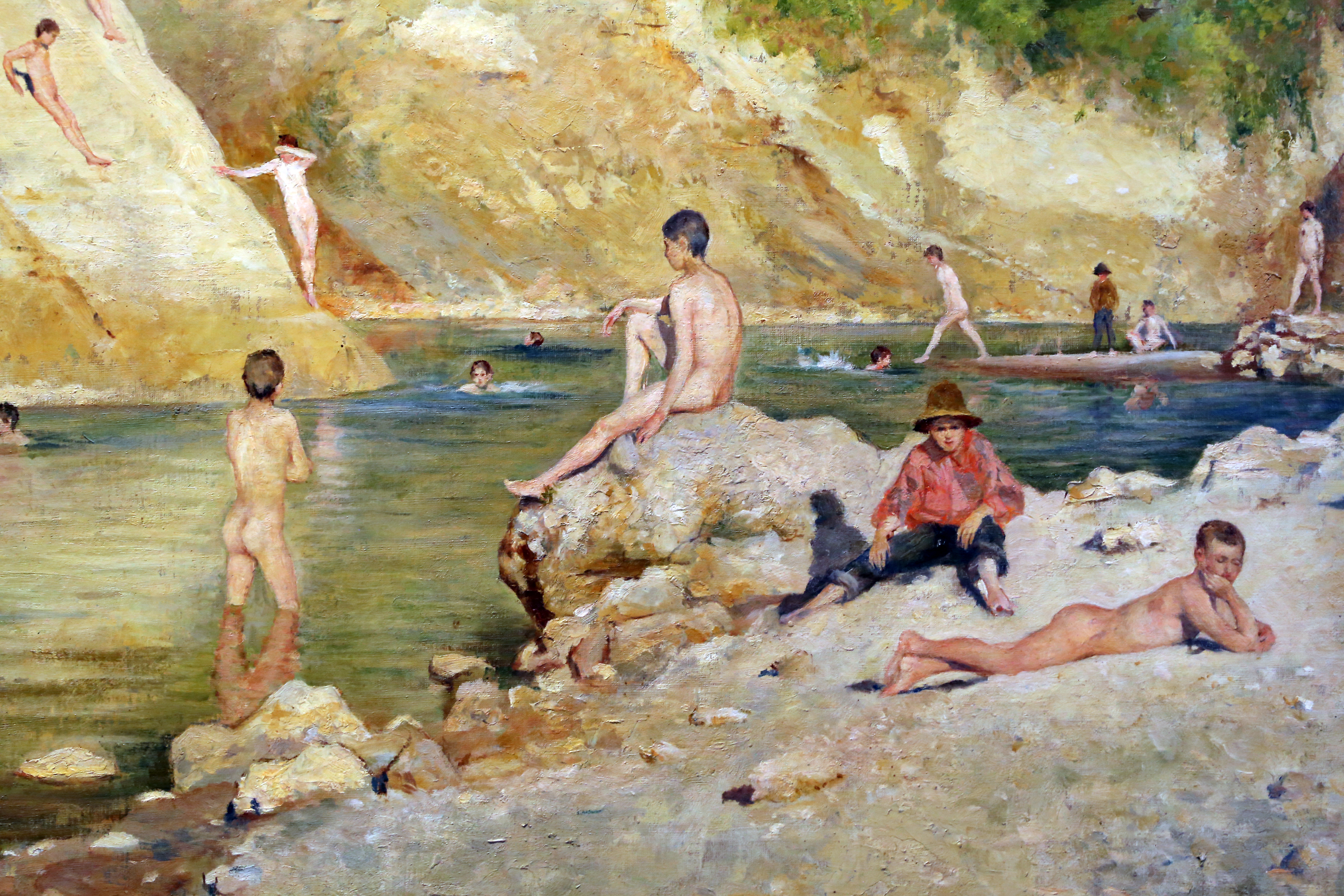
Antonio Salvetti's La Nicchia (estate sulle rive dell'Elsa), c. 1894

More specifically, the Steccaia was designed to retain the river's water, diverting it through a system of movable sluice boards inserted into stone supports, creating a barrier across the Elsa. The Callone Reale, built during the Grand Duchy of Tuscany, functioned as a sluice gate regulating the flow of water into the canals.

Immediately afterward, the river plunges over the Diborrato Waterfall.

The trail continues past several landmarks: Tonfo dei Preti, Nicchia (depicted by the painter Antonio Salvetti), Conchina, Grotta dell'Orso, Alberaia, Masso Bianco, Spianata dei Falchi.

The Sentierelsa trail ends beneath the Spugna Bridge.
