= Lano =

Lano may refer to:

- Lano, Haute-Corse, France
- Lano, Colle di Val d'Elsa, village in Tuscany, Italy
- Lano, Samoa, village on the island of Savai'i
- Laño, a small populated place in Condado de Treviño, Treviño enclave, province of Burgos, Spain, known for palaeontological discoveries
- Lano and Woodley, Australian comedy team
- Angelo Lano, American FBI agent
- Jenya Lano, Russian actress
- Kevin Lano, computer programmer
- Stefan Lano, American musician
- Lano (soap), Norwegian soap brand

== See also ==
- Llano (disambiguation)
