= Giovanni Giudici =

Italian poet, essayist, journalist and translator (1924–2011)

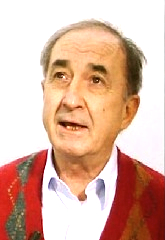
Giudici in 1992

Giovanni Giudici (26 June 1924, in Le Grazie – 24 May 2011, in La Spezia) was an Italian poet and journalist.

== Life ==
Giovanni Giudici spent his childhood in Le Grazie, where his mother gave him a strict Catholic education; her death (which occurred on 8 November 1927) hurled Giovanni down to an "abyss of deprivation". After just one year, his father married another woman, and the family moved to Cadimare. The years between 1927 and 1935 were particularly hard since Giovanni was forced to move from town to town several times because of his father's work. He finally settled in Monte Sacro, where he attended the local high school. In 1941, he enrolled at university to study medicine, but was fascinated by literature and often attended Italian literature classes at the Faculty of Humanities ("Facoltà di Lettere"). In 1942, he decided to quit studying medicine, and he enrolled at the Faculty of Humanities. In 1956 he went to work for Olivetti. He died on 24 May 2011 at the age of 86.

== Bibliography ==
- La stazione di Pisa e altre poesie, Urbino, Istituto Statale d'Arte, 1955.
- L'intelligenza col nemico, Milano, All'insegna del pesce d'oro, 1957.
- L'educazione cattolica (1962–1963), Milano, All'insegna del pesce d'oro, 1963.
- La vita in versi, Milano, Mondadori, 1965.
- Autobiologia, Milano, Mondadori, 1969.
- O beatrice, Milano, Mondadori, 1972.
- Poesie scelte (1957–1974), a cura di Fernando Bandini, Milano, Mondadori, 1975.
- Il male dei creditori, Milano, Mondadori, 1977.
- Il ristorante dei morti, Milano, Mondadori, 1981.
- Lume dei tuoi misteri, Milano, Mondadori, 1984.
- Salutz (1984–1986), Torino, Einaudi, 1986.
- Prove del teatro, Torino, Einaudi, 1989.
- Frau Doktor, Milano, Mondadori, 1989.
- Fortezza, Torino, Milano, Mondadori, 1990.
- Poesie (1953–1990), Milano, Garzanti, 1991 (2 vol.).
- Quanto spera di campare Giovanni, Milano, Garzanti, 1993.
- Un poeta del golfo, a cura di Carlo Di Alesio, Milano, Longanesi, 1995.
- Empie stelle, Milano, Garzanti, 1996.
- Eresia della Sera, Milano, Garzanti, 1999.
- I versi della vita, a cura di Rodolfo Zucco, Milano, Mondadori, 2000 (I Meridiani).
- Dedicato ai pompieri di New York da 'Poesia', 2001.
- Da una soglia infinita. Prove e poesie 1983–2002, Casette d'Ete, Grafiche Fioroni, 2004.
- Prove di vita in versi. Il primo Giudici da 'Istmi. Tracce di vita letteraria', 2012.
- Tutte le poesie, introduzione di Maurizio Cucchi, Milano, Mondadori, 2014.

=== Poetry ===
Collections

- Giudici, Giovanni (1953). Fiorì d'improvviso. Rome: Edizioni del Canzoniere.

List of poems

Title	Year	First published	Reprinted/collected
With her	2017	Giudici, Giovanni (6 November 2017). "With her". The New Yorker. Vol. 93, no. 35. Translated by Karl Kirchwey. p. 50.	
