= Cervoni =

Cervoni can refer to:

- Jean-Baptiste Cervoni (1765 – 1809), a general officer in the French army during the French Revolutionary Wars
- Isabella Cervoni 1575–1600), Italian poet of the Counter-Reformation period
- Vincent Cervoni Schopenhauer (1991-) better known by the in-game name Happy, French Counter-Strike: Global Offensive (CS:GO) player
