= Coneo =

Coneo may refer to:

== People ==
- Amanda Coneo (born 1996), Colombian volleyball player
- Gabriela Coneo (born 1993), Colombian volleyball player
- Muriel Coneo (born 1987), Colombian middle-distance runner

== Places ==
- Coneo, Colle di Val d'Elsa, Italy
