= Scarna =

- Frazione
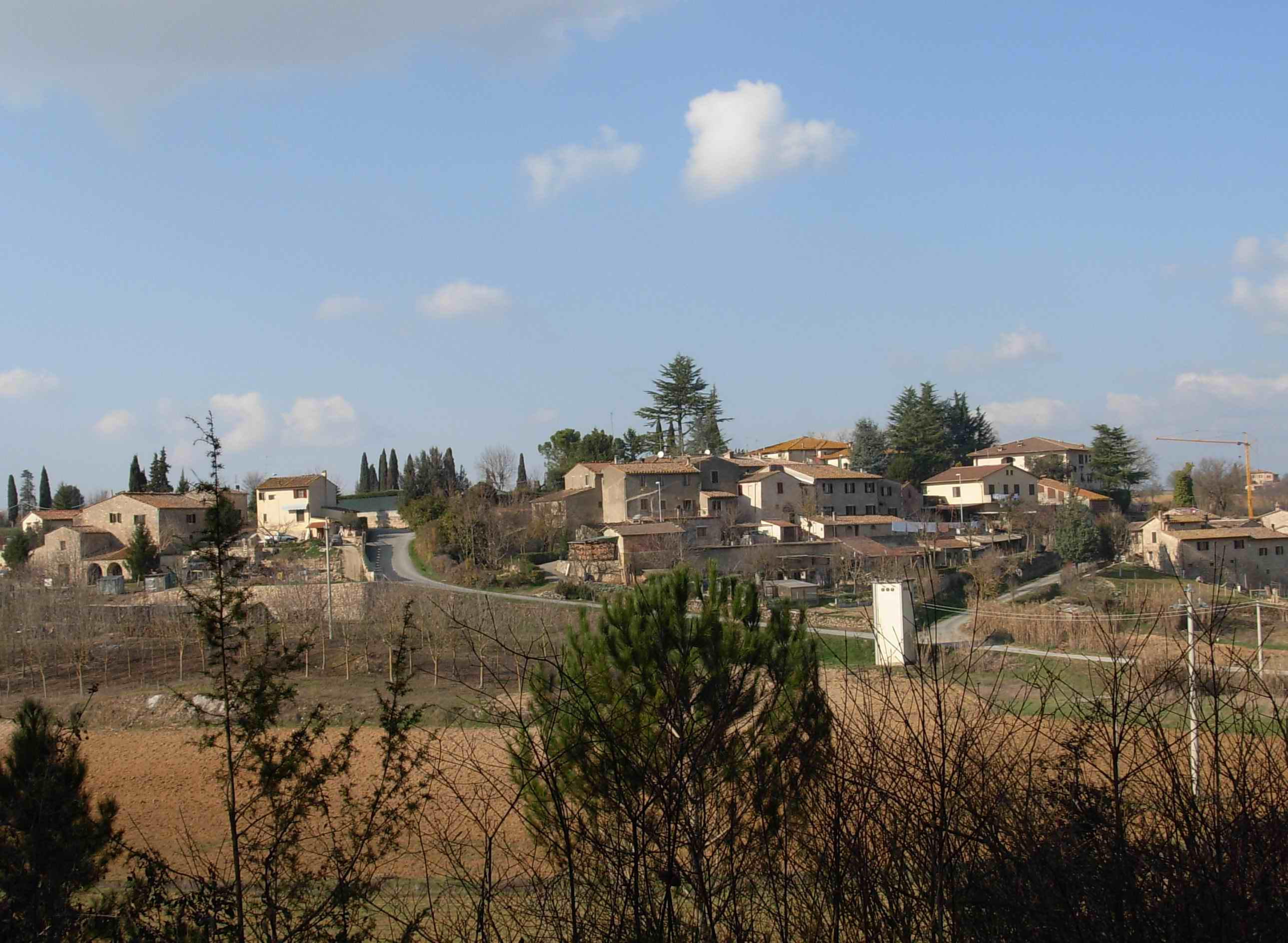
- View of Scarna

- Location of Scarna in Italy
- Coordinates: 43°23′44″N 11°9′37″E
- Country: Italy
- Region: Tuscany
- Province: Siena (SI)
- Comune: Colle di Val d'Elsa
- Elevation: 218 m (715 ft)

Population (2011)
  - Total: 57
- Time zone: UTC+1 (CET)
  - Summer (DST): UTC+2 (CEST)

Scarna is a village in Tuscany, central Italy, in the comune of Colle di Val d'Elsa, province of Siena. At the time of the 2001 census its population was 56.
