= Certaldo funicular =

Railway in Tuscany, Italy

Certaldo Funicular
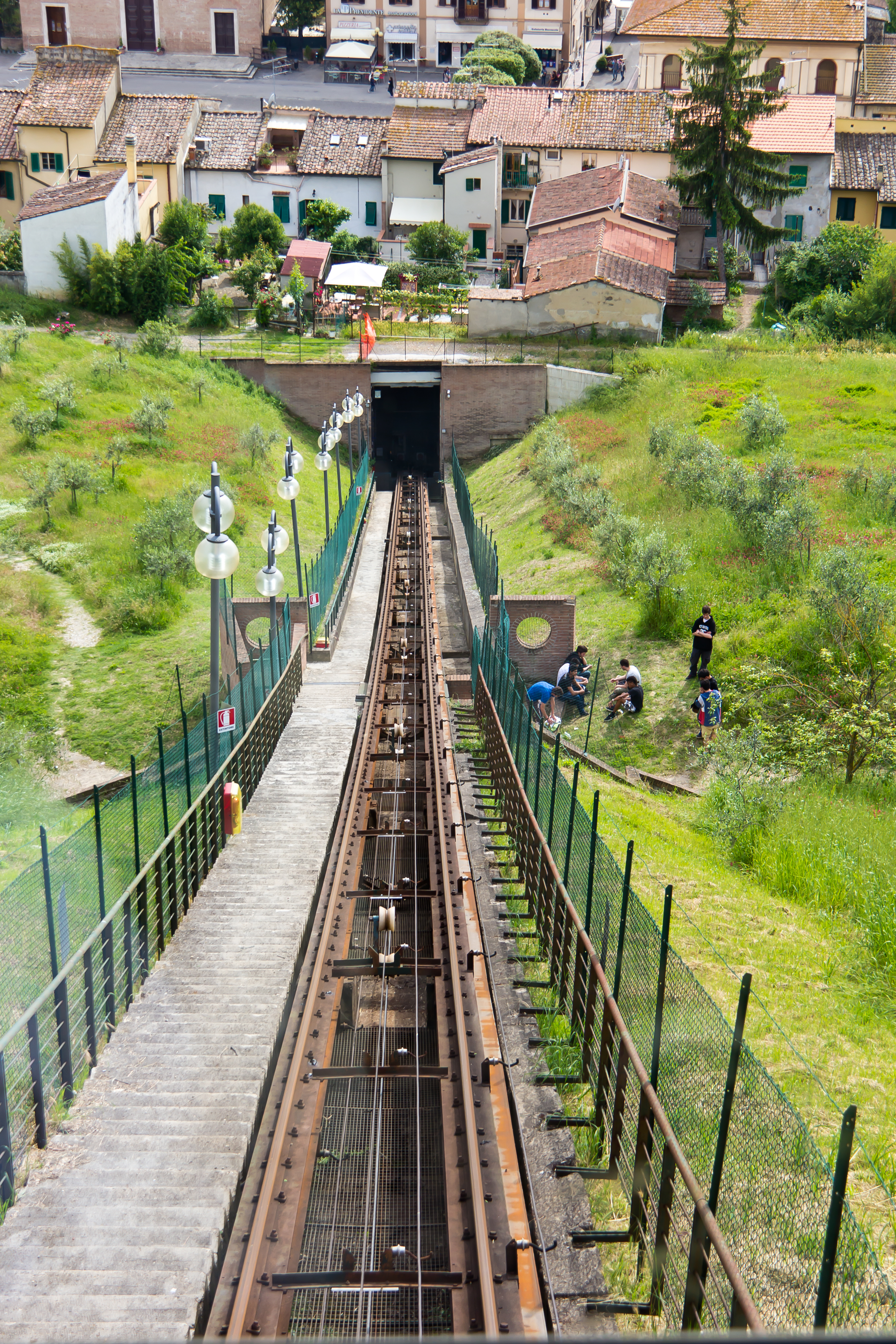

Overview
- Coordinates: 43.548570°N 11.042147°E

Service
- Type: Funicular
- Operator(s): Tiemme Toscana Mobilità

Technical
- Line length: 130 m (430 ft)
- Maximum incline: 49%

The Certaldo Funicular (Italian: Funicolare di Certaldo) is a funicular railway in the town of Certaldo, Tuscany, Italy. It links a terminus in Certaldo Basso, some 200 metres (660 ft) from Certaldo railway station, with a terminus in Certaldo Alto. The line opened on 1 July 1999, and is operated by Tiemme Toscana Mobilità.

The funicular operates every 15 minutes. Services start at 07:30 and finish at a time between 19:30 and 01:00, depending on the time of year and day of the week.

The funicular has the following technical parameters:

Configuration	single track
Length	130 m (427 ft)
Height	48 m (157 ft)
Maximum steepness	49%
Number of cars	1
Capacity	30 passengers per car
Trip time	1 minute
Traction	Electricity

== See also ==
- List of funicular railways
