= Montegabbro =

- Frazione
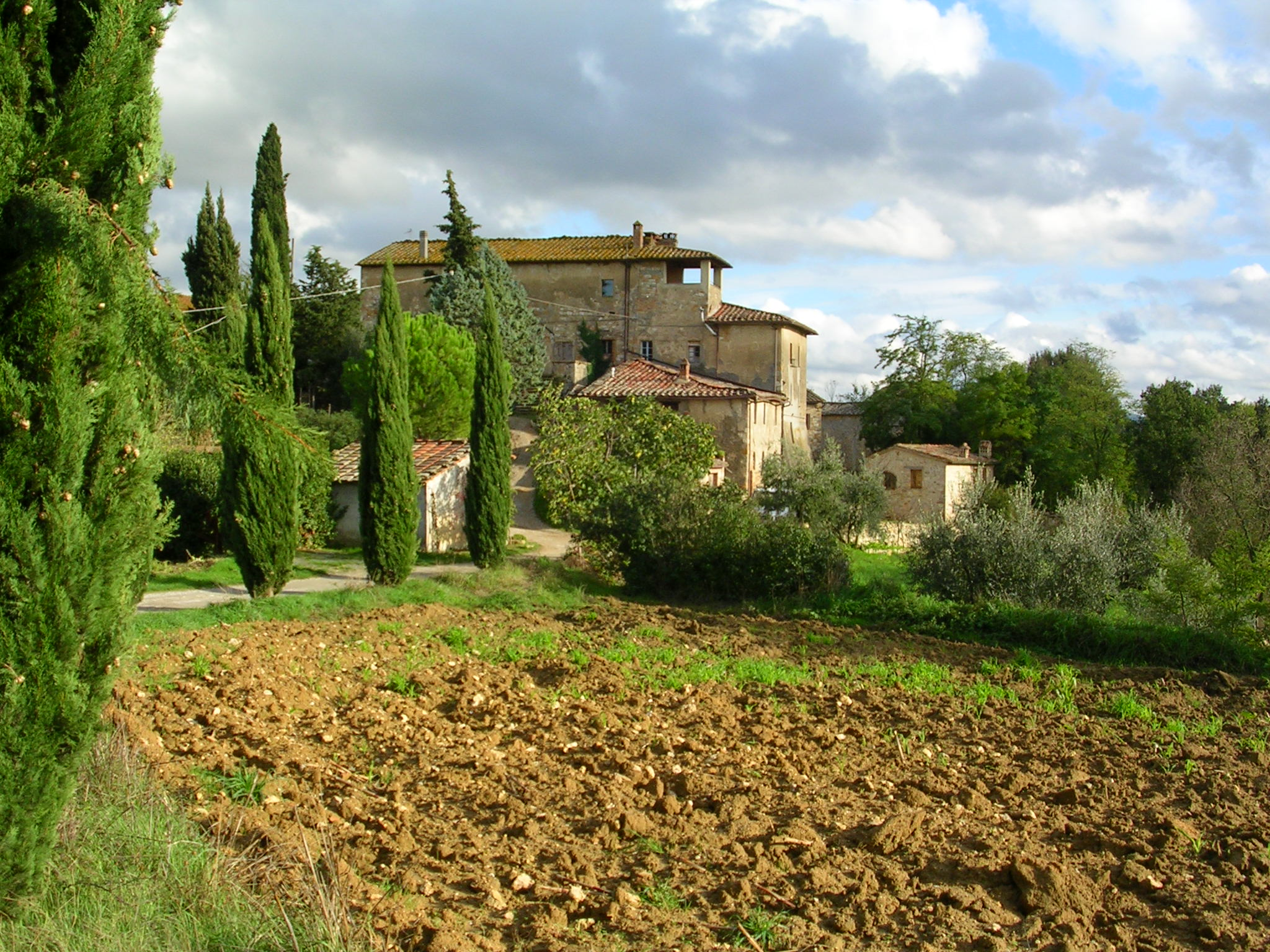
- View of Montegabbro

- Location of Montegabbro in Italy
- Coordinates: 43°24′00″N 11°2′33″E
- Country: Italy
- Region: Tuscany
- Province: Siena (SI)
- Comune: Colle di Val d'Elsa
- Elevation: 297 m (974 ft)

Population (2011)
  - Total: 10
- Time zone: UTC+1 (CET)
  - Summer (DST): UTC+2 (CEST)

Montegabbro is a village in Tuscany, central Italy, located in the comune of Colle di Val d'Elsa, province of Siena. At the time of the 2001 census its population was 14.
