= Castel San Gimignano =

- Frazione
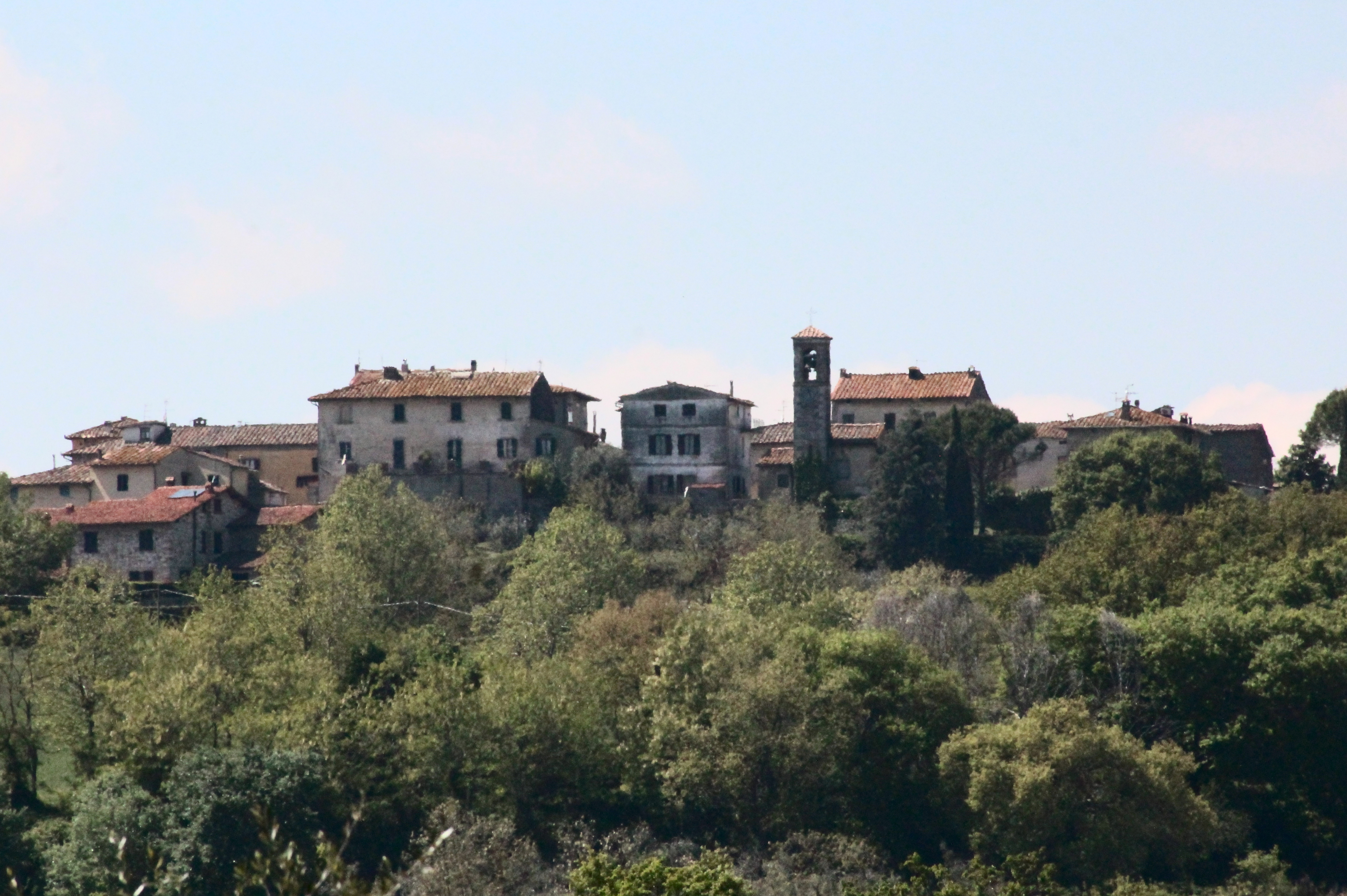
- View of Castel San Gimignano

- Location of Castel San Gimignano in Italy
- Coordinates: 43°24′13″N 11°1′18″E
- Country: Italy
- Region: Tuscany
- Province: Siena (SI)
- Comune: Colle di Val d'Elsa; San Gimignano
- Elevation: 377 m (1,237 ft)

Population (2011)
  - Total: 337
- Time zone: UTC+1 (CET)
  - Summer (DST): UTC+2 (CEST)

Castel San Gimignano is a village in Tuscany, central Italy, administratively a frazione of the comuni of Colle di Val d'Elsa and San Gimignano, province of Siena. At the time of the 2001 census its population was 334.

Castel San Gimignano is about 50 km from Siena, 24 km da Colle di Val d'Elsa and 22 km from San Gimignano.
