= Boscona =

- Frazione
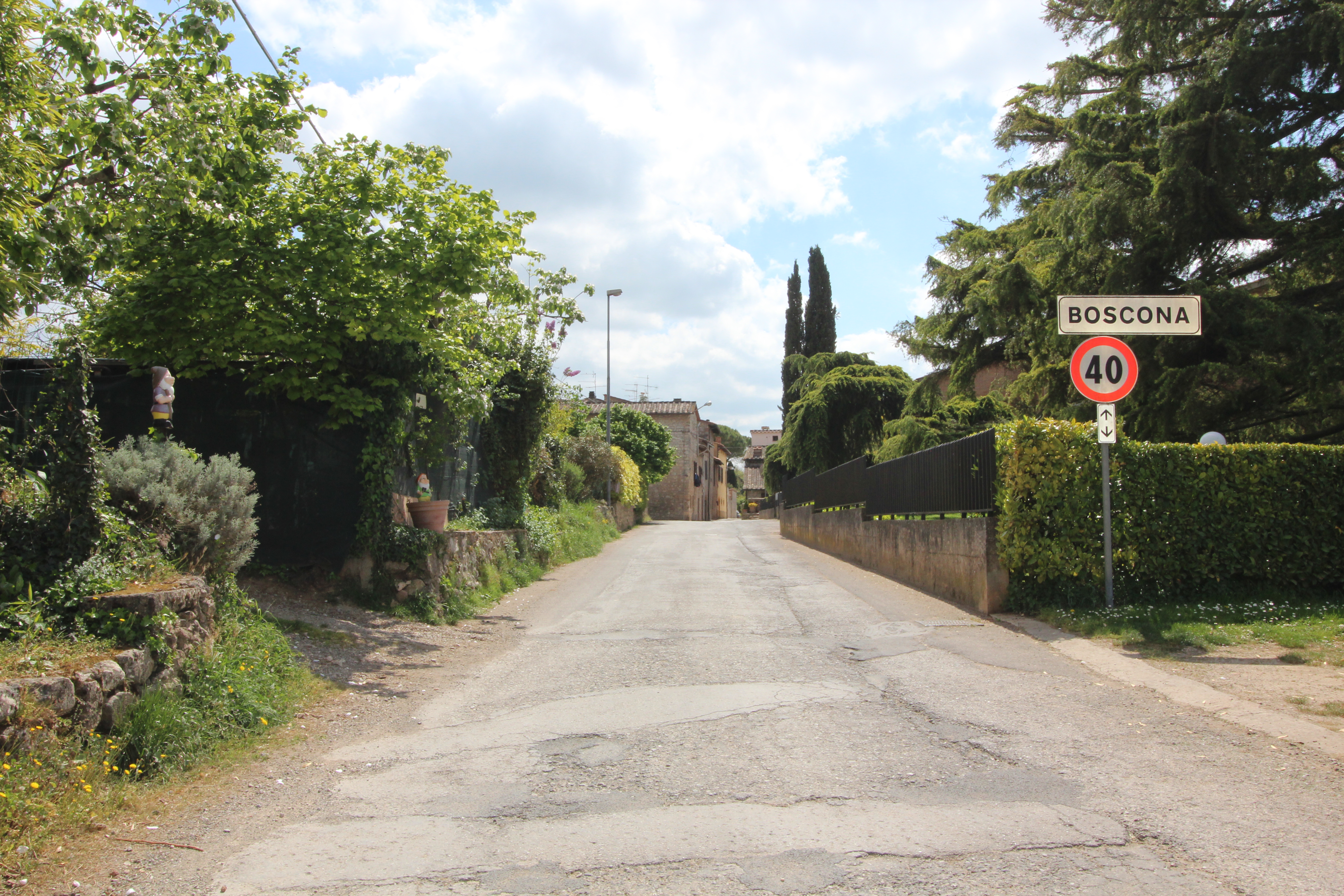

- Location of Boscona in Italy
- Coordinates: 43°24′34″N 11°6′1″E
- Country: Italy
- Region: Tuscany
- Province: Siena (SI)
- Comune: Colle di Val d'Elsa
- Elevation: 235 m (771 ft)

Population (2011)
  - Total: 64
- Time zone: UTC+1 (CET)
  - Summer (DST): UTC+2 (CEST)

Boscona is a village in Tuscany, central Italy, in the comune of Colle di Val d'Elsa, province of Siena. At the time of the 2001 census its population was 59.
