= Paurano =

- Frazione
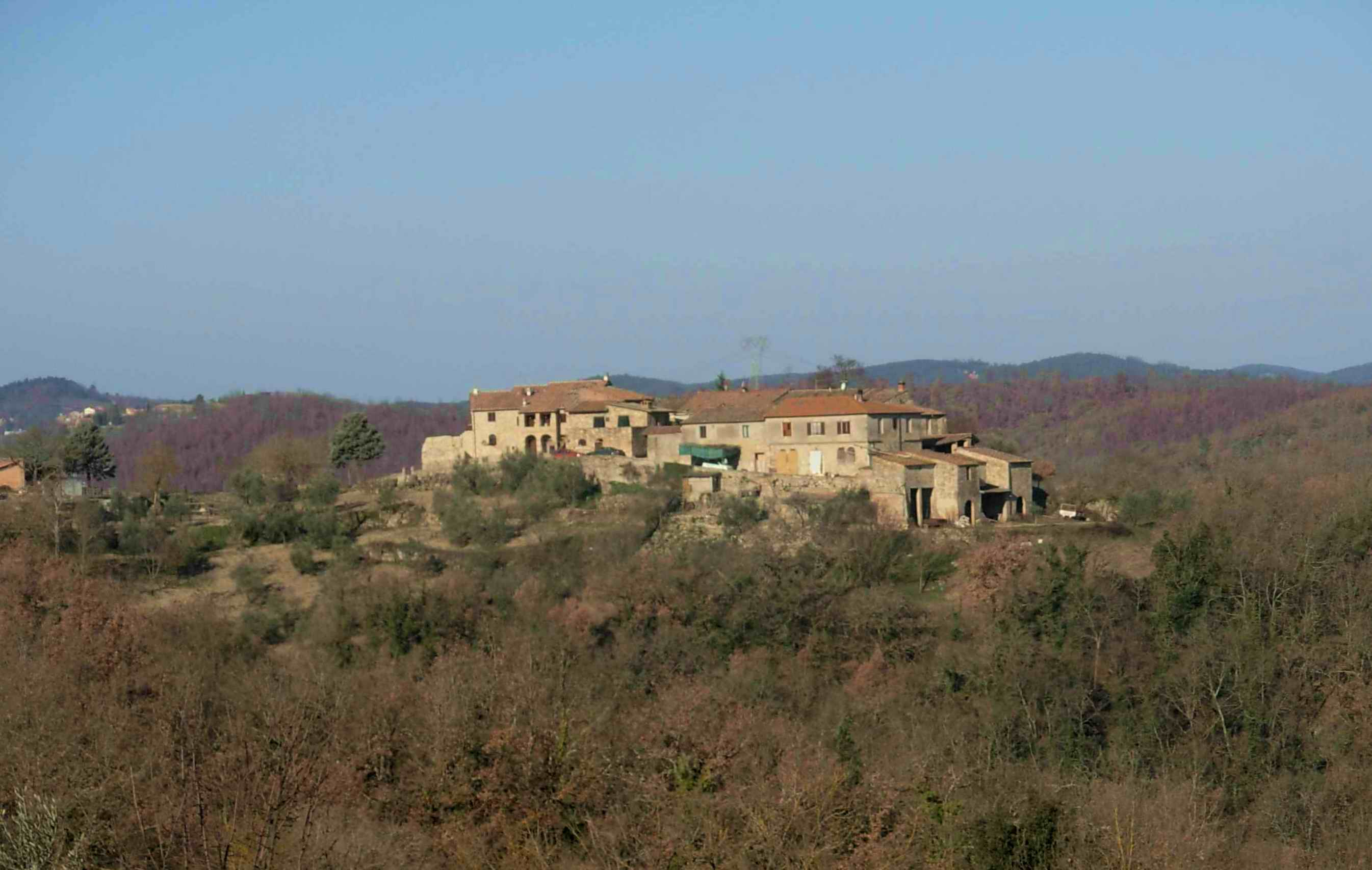
- View of Paurano

- Location of Paurano in Italy
- Coordinates: 43°21′5″N 11°6′1″E
- Country: Italy
- Region: Tuscany
- Province: Siena (SI)
- Comune: Colle di Val d'Elsa
- Elevation: 256 m (840 ft)
- Time zone: UTC+1 (CET)
  - Summer (DST): UTC+2 (CEST)

Paurano is a village in Tuscany, central Italy, in the comune of Colle di Val d'Elsa, province of Siena.

Paurano is about 32 km from Siena and 10 km from Colle di Val d'Elsa.

== Bibliography ==
- Emanuele Repetti (1841). "Paurano". Dizionario geografico fisico storico della Toscana. Vol. 4. Florence. pp. 73–74.
