= Partena =

- Frazione
- Location of Partena in Italy
- Coordinates: 43°21′26″N 11°6′44″E
- Country: Italy
- Region: Tuscany
- Province: Siena (SI)
- Comune: Colle di Val d'Elsa
- Elevation: 258 m (846 ft)
- Time zone: UTC+1 (CET)
  - Summer (DST): UTC+2 (CEST)

Partena is a village in Tuscany, central Italy, in the comune of Colle di Val d'Elsa, province of Siena.

Partena is about 30 km from Siena and 8 km from Colle di Val d'Elsa.

== Bibliography ==
- Emanuele Repetti. "Partena di Colle". Dizionario geografico fisico storico della Toscana. Vol. 6S. Florence. p. 176.
