= Buliciano =

- Frazione
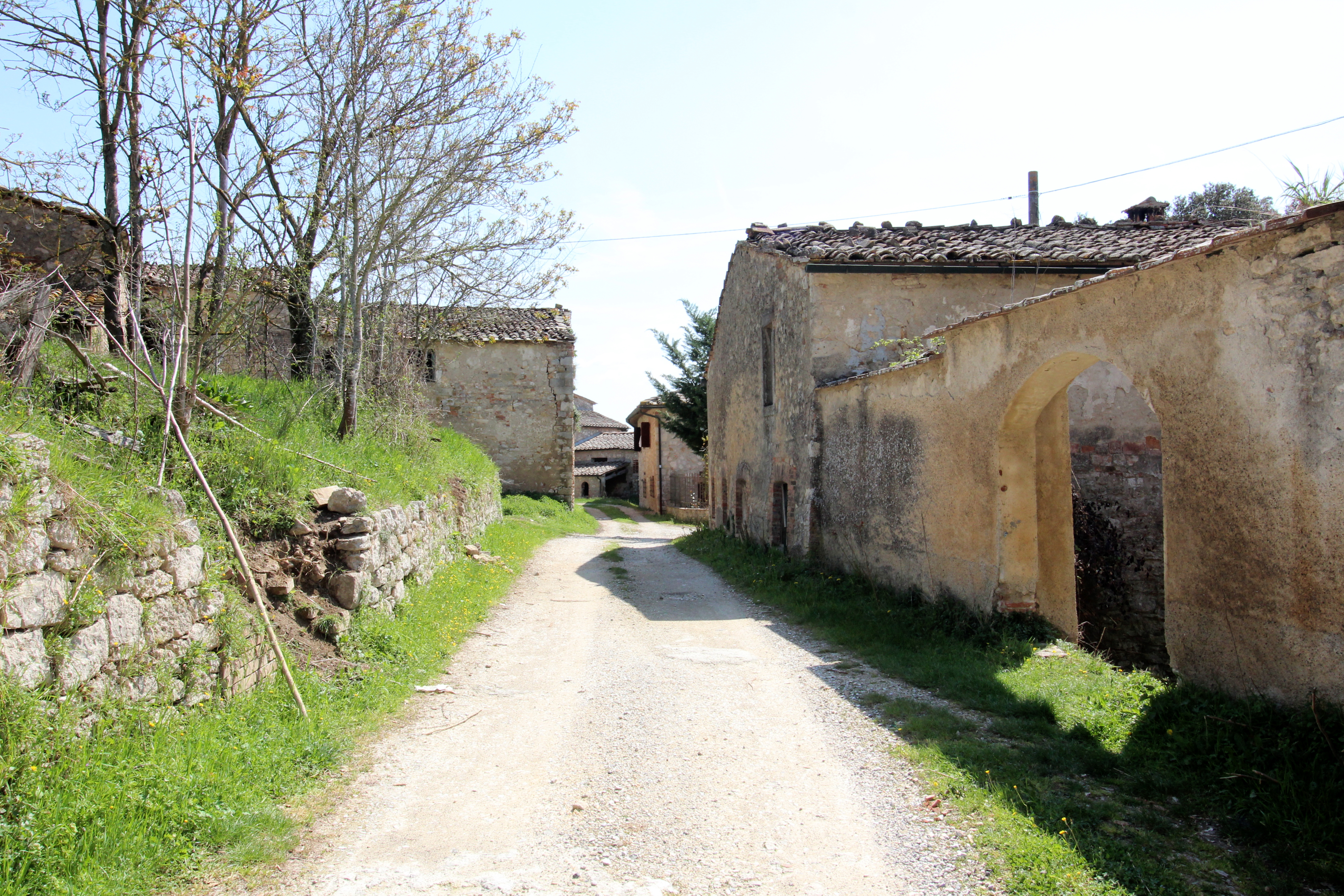

- Location of Buliciano in Italy
- Coordinates: 43°23′26″N 11°3′12″E
- Country: Italy
- Region: Tuscany
- Province: Siena (SI)
- Comune: Colle di Val d'Elsa
- Elevation: 284 m (932 ft)
- Time zone: UTC+1 (CET)
  - Summer (DST): UTC+2 (CEST)

Buliciano is a village in Tuscany, central Italy, in the comune of Colle di Val d'Elsa, province of Siena.

Buliciano is about 35 km from Siena and 8 km from Colle di Val d'Elsa.

== Bibliography ==
- Emanuele Repetti (1843). "Pulicciano (Buliciano)". Dizionario geografico fisico storico della Toscana. Vol. 4. Florence. p. 684.
