= Colle di Val d'Elsa =

- Comune
- Comune di Colle Val d'Elsa
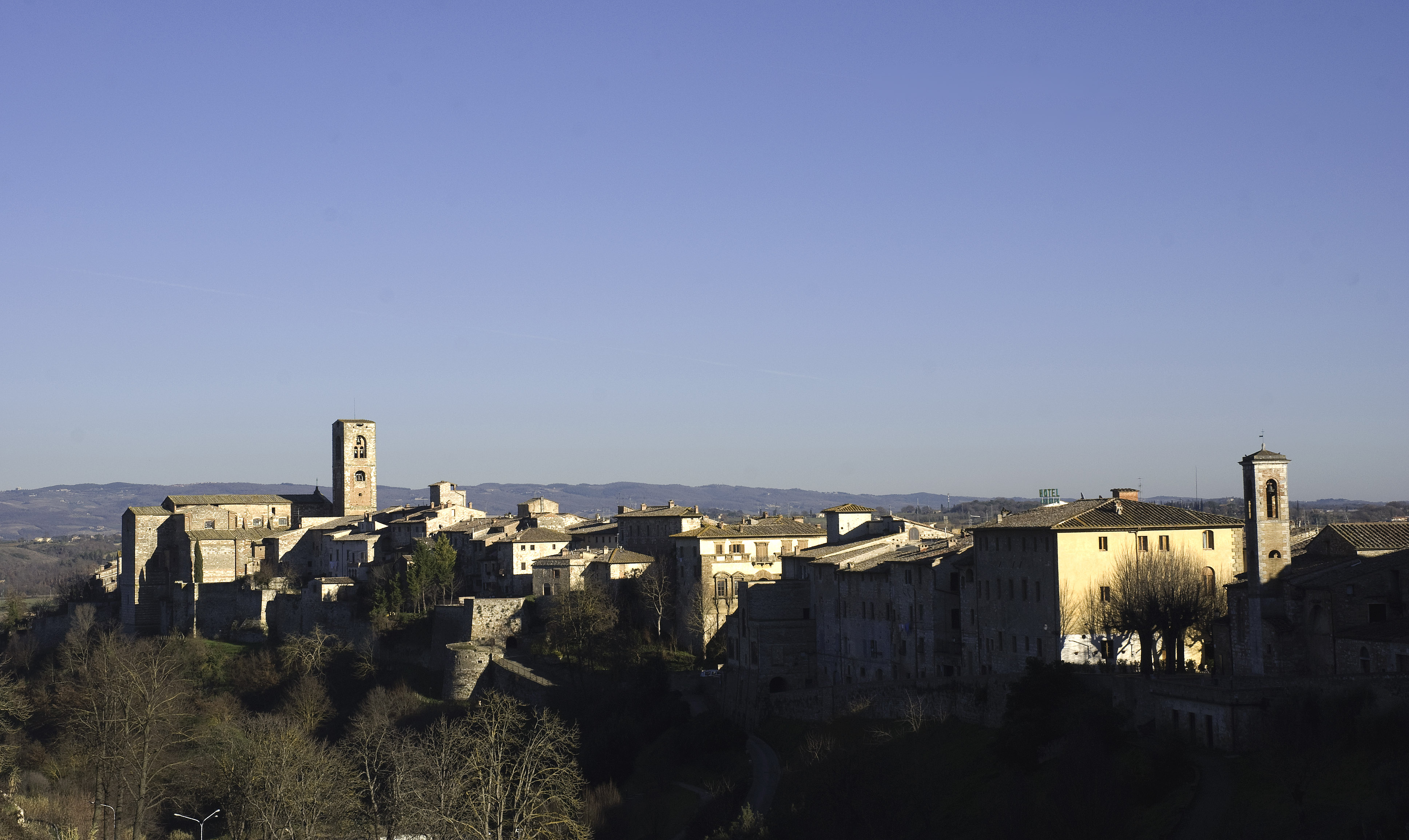

- Coat of arms

- Location within Italy Location within Tuscany
- Coordinates: 43°24′N 11°08′E
- Country: Italy
- Region: Tuscany
- Province: Siena (SI)
- Frazioni: Bibbiano, Borgatello, Campiglia dei Foci, Castel San Gimignano, Collalto, Gracciano dell'Elsa, Le Grazie, Mensanello, Quartaia

Government
  - Mayor: Piero Pii

Area
  - Total: 92 km^{2} (36 sq mi)
- Elevation: 141 m (463 ft)

Population (30 June 2017)
  - Total: 21,604
  - Density: 230/km^{2} (610/sq mi)
- Demonym: Colligiani
- Time zone: UTC+1 (CET)
  - Summer (DST): UTC+2 (CEST)
- Postal code: 53034
- Patron saint: St. Martialis and St. Albert of Chiatina
- Saint day: July 1
- Website: Official website

Colle di Val d'Elsa (often shortened to Colle Val d’Elsa and known locally simply as Colle) is a town and comune in the province of Siena, Tuscany. As of June 2017, it had a population of approximately 21,600.

Its name means "Hill of the Elsa Valley", where Elsa is the name of the river which flows through the town and Valdelsa the name of the valley. It is located in central Tuscany, about 20 km (12 mi) northwest of Siena and 50 km (31 mi) south of Florence. The town is divided into two main areas: the historic "Colle Alta" (upper town), located on a hill and the modern "Colle Bassa" (lower town), which developed in the valley below.

Colle di Val d'Elsa is internationally renowned for its crystal glass industry, which accounts for approximately 15% of global crystal production. Manufacturing is largely concentrated in the industrial area of the lower town.

== History ==
The settlement originally developed as three independent districts: the Borough of Santa Caterina, the Castle of Piticciano (upper town) and the Piano (lower town).

The first two settlements are the oldest and traditionally served as the strongholds of the city's ruling families. Located along the same east–west ridge, they overlook the valley floor, where the third district, the Piano, later developed. Historically, the Piano has been the centre of the town's productive and industrial activities.

Although the territory contains significant archaeological evidence dating back as far as the 4th millennium BC, the earliest written references to Colle di Val d'Elsa date from the 10th century. It was from the late 12th century, however, that the town gradually gained political autonomy and a distinct civic identity. The earliest surviving municipal statutes date back to 1307.

Located along the Via Francigena, Colle di Val d'Elsa began to experience economic development from the 12th and 13th centuries onwards.

As early as the Middle Ages, the urban area, extended beyond the upper town to include the Piano, which developed along the course of the ancient gore, artificial canals branching from the Elsa River. These waterways were constructed over the centuries, beginning in the early 13th century, to power numerous water-driven industries, including mills, paper mills, and fulling mills. The gore contributed significantly to the city's economy, supporting the development of its manufacturing activities.

Throughout its history, Colle di Val d'Elsa was the site of several military conflicts. Among the most notable was the battle of Colle di Val d'Elsa, referenced in Dante Alighieri's Divine Comedy, during the wars of Guelphs and Ghibellines, which had significant consequences for the political balance of Tuscany. Another major event was the siege by the Neapolitan troops in 1479, fought in defense of Florentine territory. The siege caused extensive destruction but also resulted in significant improvements in the town's defensive fortifications.

From the 14th century it was a possession of Florence and the Grand Duchy of Tuscany until the unification of Italy. Colle di Val d'Elsa remained within Florence's sphere of influence, increasing its political importance, particularly under the patronage of the Medici family and through the prominent local citizens who served in the administration of the Grand Duchy of Tuscany. Following the War of Siena and the establishment of the Grand Duchy of Tuscany, Pope Clement VIII created a new diocese in Colle di Val d'Elsa in 1592 through a papal bull.

During the early modern period, the traditional paper industry gradually gave way to the iron and glass industries. Glass production, and later crystal manufacturing, became the town's principal industry. By the 19th century, Colle di Val d'Elsa had become known as "the Bohemia of Italy." It is now commonly referred to as the "City of Crystal".

The period of industrialization coincided with the rise of socialism and the development of political journalism, exemplified by the publication of the newspaper La Martinella.

During World War II Colle di Val d'Elsa was bombed by Allied aircraft.

=== Crystal production ===
Glassmaking in Colle di Val d'Elsa is documented from at least the 14th century. A provision in the municipal statutes of 1331 refers to the use of wood from the municipal forest by furnaces producing glass vessels, providing the earliest known documentary evidence of glass production in the town. Medieval and early modern glassmaking was associated with the network of water-powered industries and craft activities that developed in the lower town.

Glassmaking in the modern period underwent significant development from 1820, when the Alsatian glassmaker Francesco Mathis established a factory in the lower town, near the former Augustinian convent and the Church of Sant'Agostino. The factory had facilities for grinding and engraving finished pieces. At this stage, the glass produced in the town did not yet contain lead oxide, a component that increases the refractive index and brilliance of glass and characterizes lead crystal.

After Mathis's death in 1832, the factory was taken over by the Bavarian glassmaker Giovan Battista Schmid, who had previously worked at other Italian glassworks. Under Schmid's management, production expanded and the factory received awards at national and international exhibitions, including a gold medal at the 1855 Paris Exposition. Schmid remained at the head of the factory until his death in 1885. Following a dispute among his heirs, the factory was sold in 1889 to the glass manufacturer Alfonso Nardi.

In 1921, the industrialist Modesto Boschi reopened a glassworks after the closure of Nardi's factory. In the immediate post-war period, the Boschi glassworks intensified research into the production of lead crystal at the Fabbrichina plant. In 1946, a glass mixture containing 15–16% lead oxide was produced.

In 1963, Cristalleria La Piana produced glass containing more than 24% lead oxide. During the 1960s, several crystal manufacturers were established, some of which are still active today.

In 2008, RCR Cristalleria Italiana patented a lead-free crystal glass as part of the development of materials intended as alternatives to lead crystal.

The former Boschi glassworks now houses the Crystal Museum, which opened in 2001 and documents the history of glass and crystal production in Colle di Val d'Elsa from the medieval period to the 20th century.

== Main sights ==
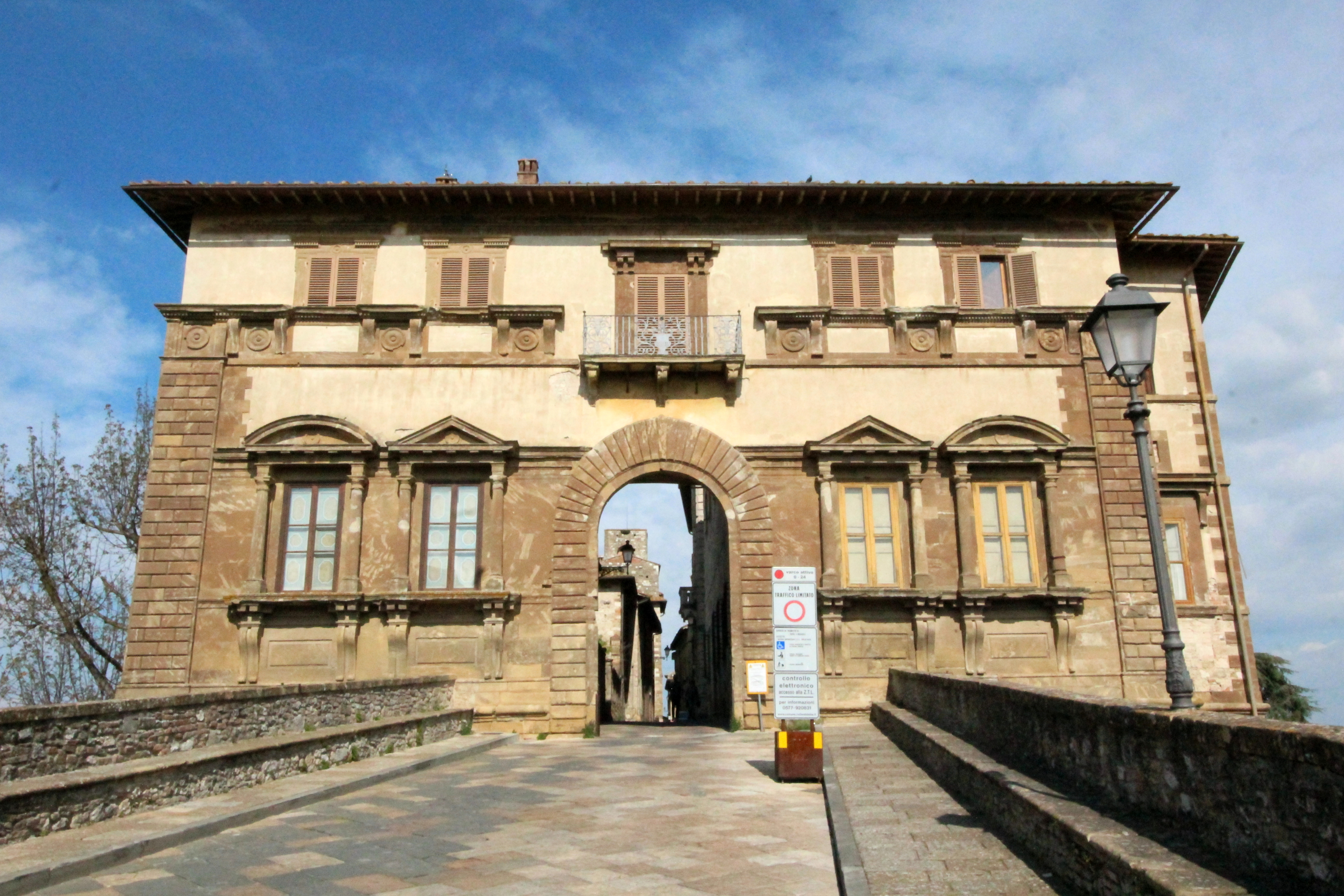
Palazzo Campana

The oldest part of the town is "Colle Alta", with a well-preserved medieval centre. The village is entered through the ancient and monumental Porta Nova and winds its long and narrow way in a sequence of fine 16th- and 17th-century noble houses (notably Palazzo Usimbardi, Palazzo Buoninsegni and the Town Hall) to the Palazzo Campana, which marks the entrance to the Castle, the oldest part of the historic centre. Here, the village is characterized by narrow paved lanes, 15th- and 16th-century noble houses (such as Palazzo Luci, Palazzo Morozzi, Palazzo Giusti, Palazzo Dini) and tower-houses, including the one where Arnolfo di Cambio was born. At the centre of the old town stands the Colle di Val d'Elsa Cathedral. Overlooking the valley stands the Convent of San Francesco.

In addition to the Crystal Museum in the lower town, the upper town houses the Ranuccio Bianchi Bandinelli Archaeological Museum, which features archaeological finds from the surrounding area, and the San Pietro Museum, which holds a collection of civic and sacred art. Beyond the city centre, the Dometaia Archaeological Park preserves an Etruscan necropolis dating from the 6th century BC to the 2nd century AD.

Colle di Val d'Elsa has also been shaped by urban regeneration projects involving contemporary art and architecture.

== Frazioni ==
The municipality is formed by the city of Colle di Val d'Elsa and the towns and villages (frazioni) of Bibbiano, Borgatello, Campiglia dei Foci, Castel San Gimignano, Collalto, Gracciano dell'Elsa, Le Grazie, Mensanello and Quartaia. Other notable villages within the comune include Boscona, Buliciano, Coneo, Lano, Montegabbro, Onci, Partena, Paurano, Sant'Andrea and Scarna.

== Notable people ==
- Arnolfo di Cambio, architect and sculptor
- Cennino Cennini, painter
- Bartolomeo Scala, politician, author and historian
- Alessandra Scala, humanist and scholar
- Francesco Campana, statesman
- Isabella Cervoni, poet
- Pietro Usimbardi, bishop of Arezzo and secretary to the Grand Dukes of Tuscany
- Ferdinando Morozzi, cartographer and architect
- Carlo Collodi, author, humourist and journalist, who studied in Colle di Val d'Elsa
- Antonio Salvetti, architect and painter
- Tarquinia Tarquini, dramatic soprano
- Mino Maccari, painter, engraver and writer
- Romano Bilenchi, novelist, short story writer and essayist

== Twin towns ==
- (Morocco) Bir Gandus, Western Sahara
