= Bibbiano, Colle di Val d'Elsa =

Bibbiano
- Frazione
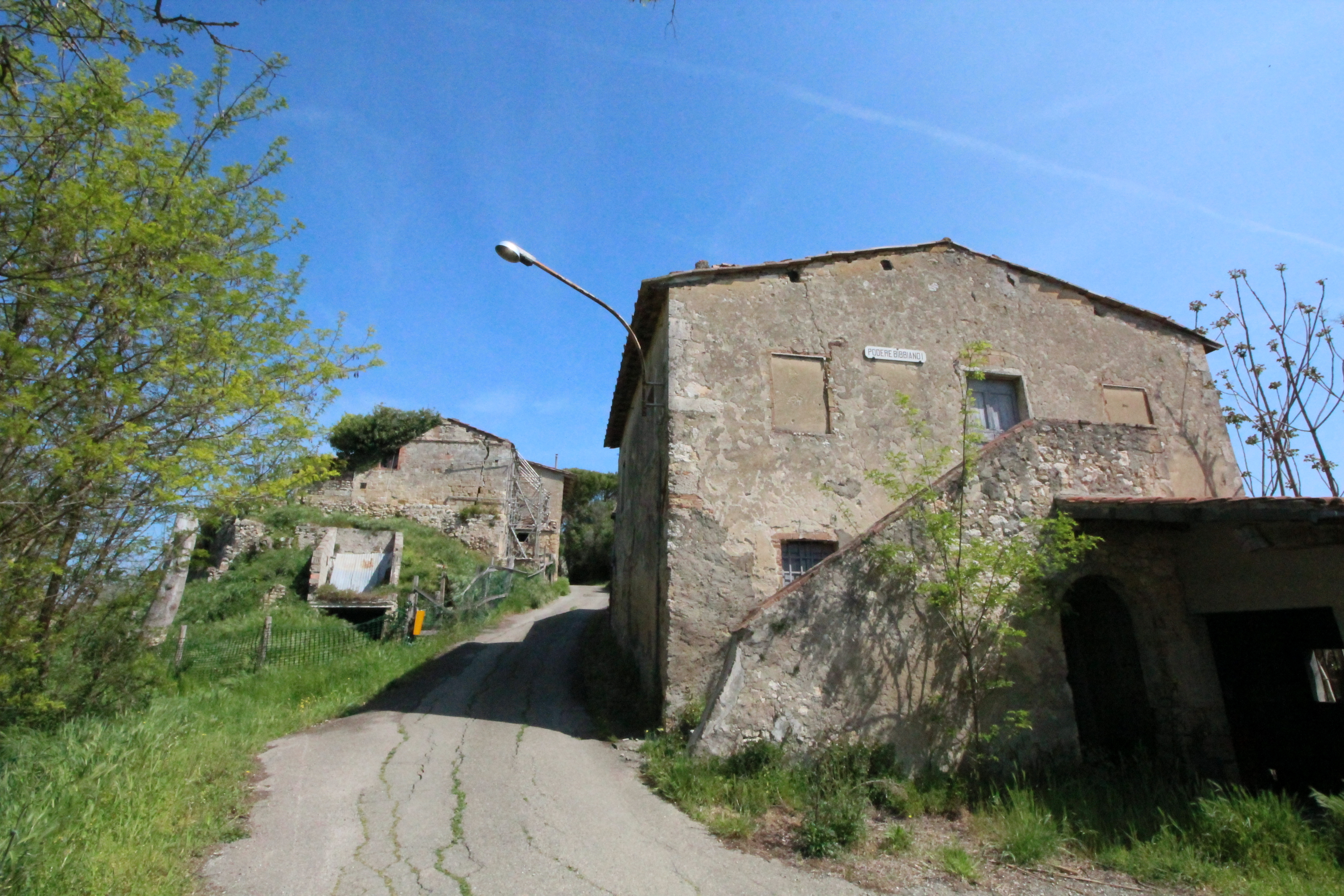

- Location of Bibbiano in Italy
- Coordinates: 43°26′46″N 11°5′58″E
- Country: Italy
- Region: Tuscany
- Province: Siena (SI)
- Comune: Colle di Val d'Elsa
- Elevation: 218 m (715 ft)

Population (2011)
  - Total: 56
- Time zone: UTC+1 (CET)
  - Summer (DST): UTC+2 (CEST)

Bibbiano is a village in Tuscany, central Italy, administratively a frazione of the comune of Colle di Val d'Elsa, province of Siena. At the time of the 2001 census its population was 43.

Bibbiano is about 33 km from Siena and 7 km from Colle di Val d'Elsa.
