= Quartaia =

- Frazione
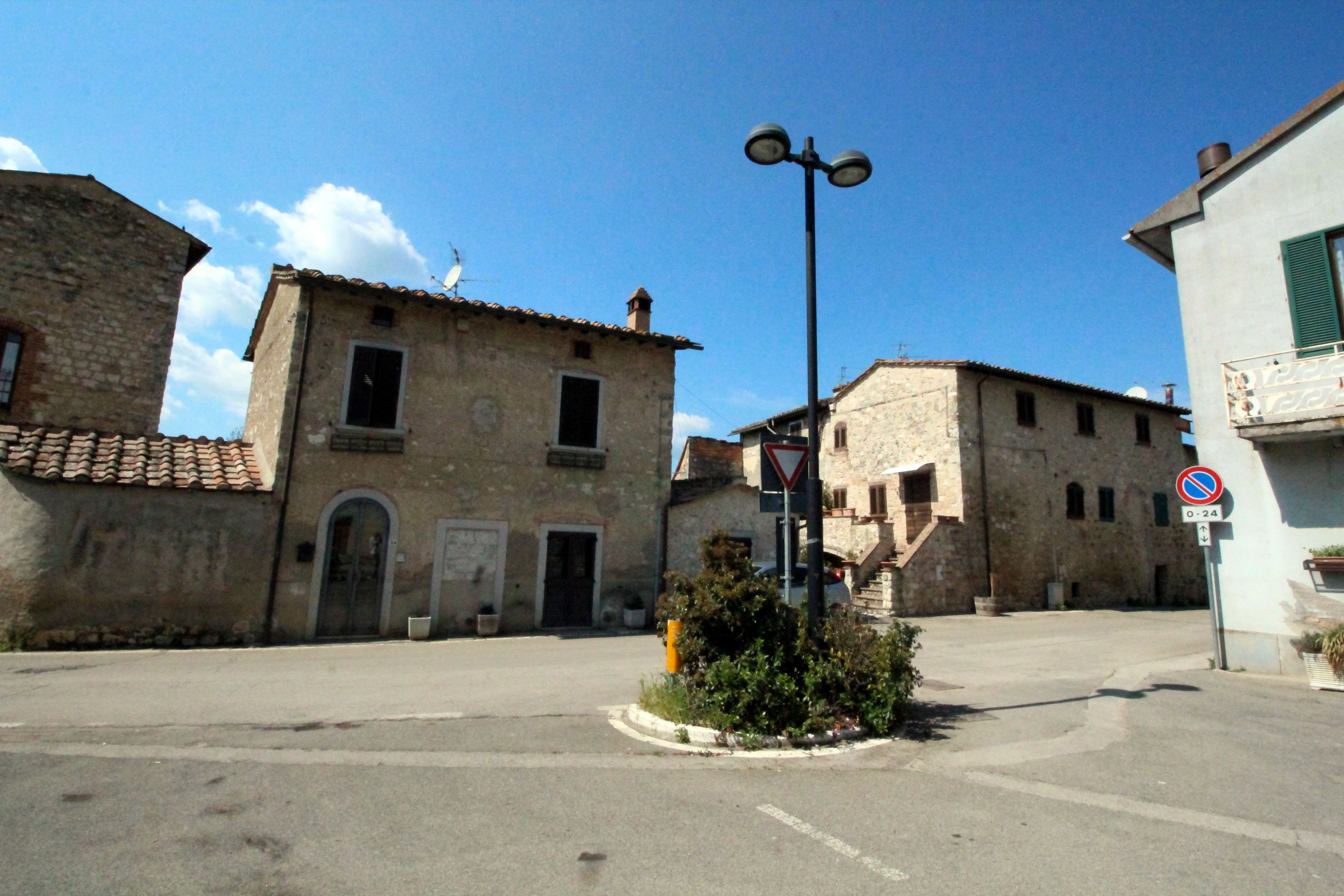

- Location of Quartaia in Italy
- Coordinates: 43°23′13″N 11°5′21″E
- Country: Italy
- Region: Tuscany
- Province: Siena (SI)
- Comune: Colle di Val d'Elsa
- Elevation: 266 m (873 ft)

Population (2011)
  - Total: 487
- Time zone: UTC+1 (CET)
  - Summer (DST): UTC+2 (CEST)

Quartaia is a village in Tuscany, central Italy, administratively a frazione of the comune of Colle di Val d'Elsa, province of Siena. At the time of the 2001 census its population was 436.

== Monuments ==
- Church of Santi Jacopo e Filippo
