= Valdelsa =

Valley in Tuscany, Italy

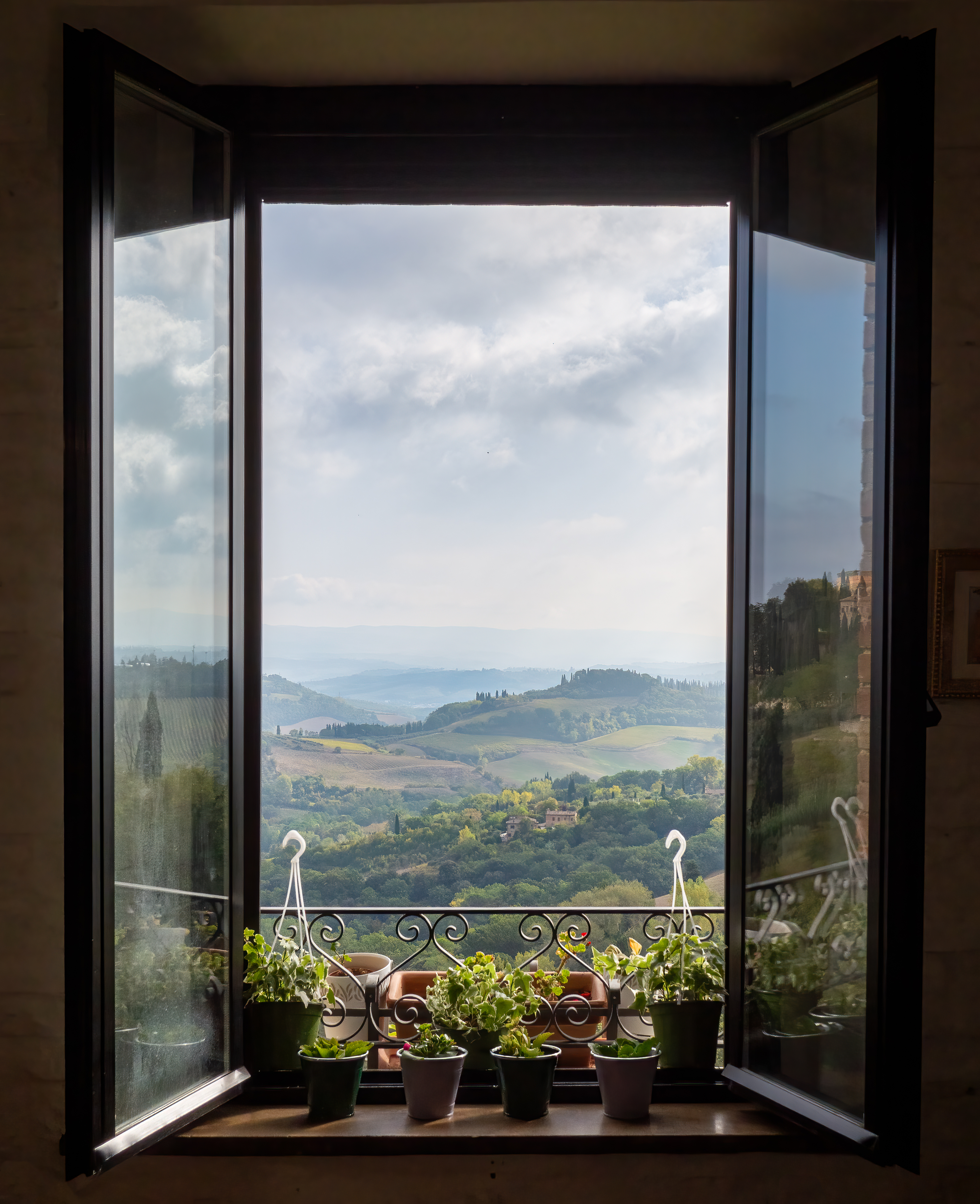
Window in a cafe in San Gimignano

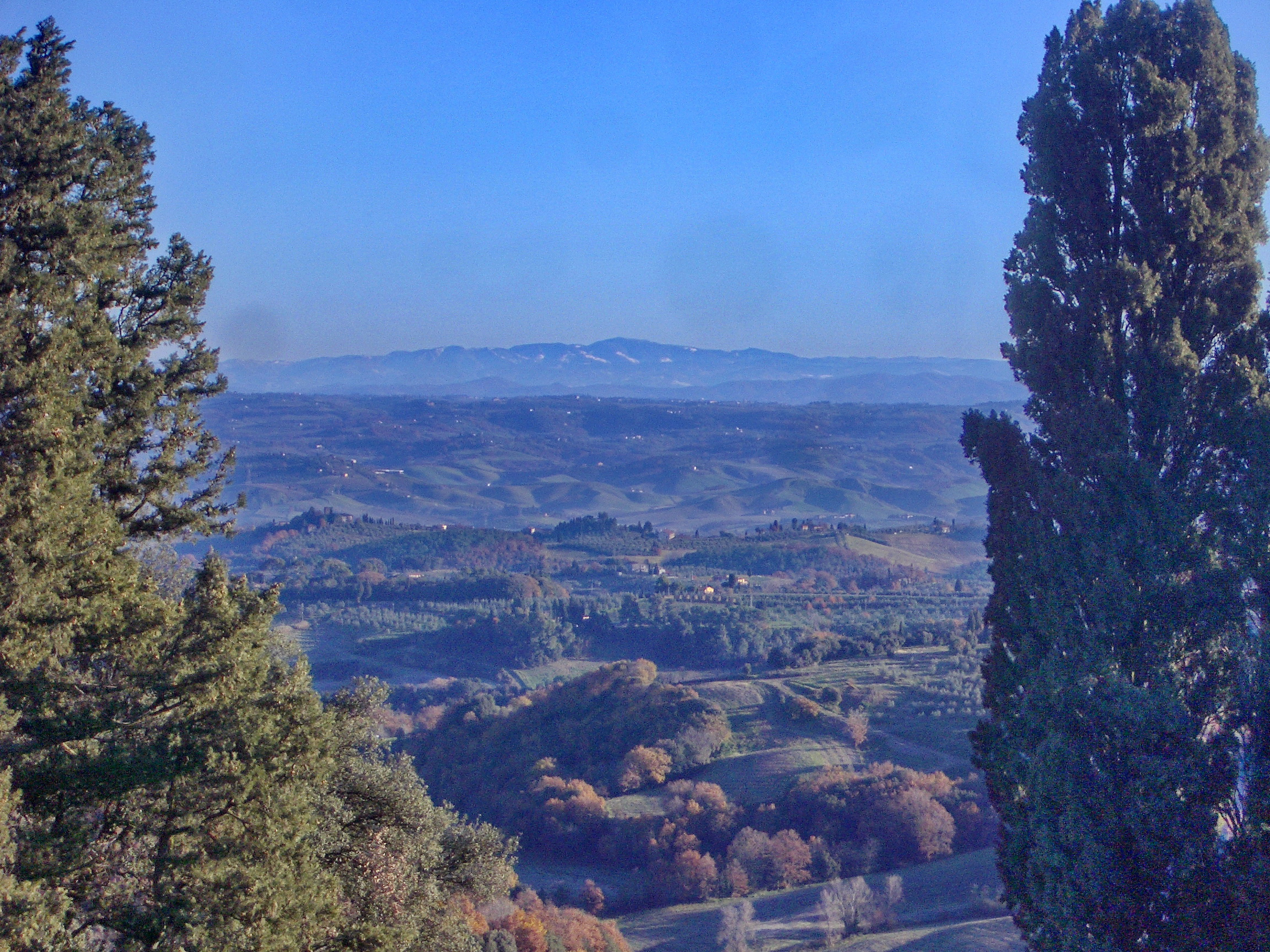
Valdelsa between Certaldo and Castelfiorentino

Valdelsa or Val d'Elsa is the valley of the river Elsa, in Tuscany, central Italy. The valley is divided into two traditional regions: Alta Valdelsa ("Upper Valdelsa"), in the province of Siena, with Poggibonsi being the largest town in the area and Bassa Valdelsa ("Lower Valdelsa"), in the Metropolitan City of Florence, with Empoli being the largest town. Other centers in the valley include Castelfiorentino, Certaldo, Colle di Val d'Elsa and San Miniato.

== Geography ==
It borders to the west with the Val di Cecina in the Volterra area, to the east with the first hills of the Chianti region, to the south with the Val di Merse, and to the north with the Valdarno.

Alta Valdelsa comprises the municipalities of Casole d’Elsa, Colle di Val d’Elsa, Monteriggioni, Poggibonsi, Radicondoli, San Gimignano.

Bassa Valdelsa comprises the municipalities of Barberino Val d’Elsa, Certaldo, Castelfiorentino, Empoli (also in the Valdarno), Gambassi Terme, Montaione, Montespertoli, San Miniato (also in the Valdarno and administratively part of the province of Pisa).

== History ==
The Valdelsa was a center of the Etruscan civilization, as shown by a wide range of findings in the area, including several necropolises.

In the Middle Ages, it was crossed by the Via Francigena, a pilgrimage road connecting France and Northern Europe to Rome, and therefore saw an economic and religious development. There were numerous churches, convents and pleban churches, while its strategical role is testified by the presence of a series of towers and fortified boroughs, mostly from the 10th and 11th century, built by noble families such as the Alberti and the Cadolingi. The valley entered under the influence of the growing power of the Republic of Florence in the 13th-14th centuries. Under the Medici, the economic role of Valdelsa lost importance, since the rulers of Florence exploited it as a merely agricultural area.

Things would change with the rise to power of the Lorraines and the construction of the Central Tuscany railway line in 1848, which, by crossing the entire Elsa valley floor, managed to give new economic and commercial momentum to the whole area, fostering the development of several industrial and manufacturing districts along the railway route.

== Economy ==
The economy of the Valdelsa is essentially divided into two parts. One is still centered on the manufacturing sector, mainly in the larger towns. The other, mostly found in the small hilltop towns on either side of the main valley, more gradually is moving away from industrialization and returning to agriculture, especially in terms of high-quality production, green tourism and related services.
