= Isabella Cervoni =

Italian poet

Isabella Cervoni (Colle Val d'Elsa, 1575–1600) was an Italian poet of the Counter-Reformation period, active between 1590 and 1600. She wrote encomiastic and polemical poems addressed to numerous secular and religious dignitaries of the Italian Renaissance, including Pope Clement VIII, Maria de' Medici, Christina of Lorraine and Henry IV of France. She was praised for her talent and ambition by Cristoforo Bronzini in his 1625 dialogue Della dignità delle donne, dialogo…settimana prima e giornata quarta as having "given the world many beautiful and spiritual compositions" despite her "most tender age."

== Biography ==
Cervoni was the daughter of the poet Giovanni Cervoni (1508-after 1582), who wrote frequently for the Medici court and published with Giorgio Marescotti in Florence. Like her father, in her early work Cervoni concentrated on praise of the Medici family. Her first poem on record is the 1590 "Canzone . . . sopra 'l felicissimo Natale del Ser[enissi]mo Prencipe di Toscana" which can be found in manuscript form in the National Central Library (Florence). The poem, written when she could not have been older than fifteen, is addressed to Christina of Lorraine on the birth of her son, Cosimo II de' Medici. She first published in 1592, with a second canzone to Lorraine on the occasion of Cosimo II's baptism. Her subject matter shifted in the middle of the 1590s, when she began to focus less on the familial milestones of the Medici family, and more on the political and religious upheavals of the period. This is evident in her canzoni dedicated to Henry IV of France and Pope Clement VIII in 1597, both of which celebrated the French king's conversion from Protestantism to Catholicism.

Her most unusual publication, which was printed in 1598 by Giovanni Battista Bellagamba in Bologna, is Orazione della Signora Isabella Cervoni da Colle al santissimo, e beatissimo padre, e Signor Nostro, Papa Clemente Ottavo, Sopra l’impresa di Ferrarra, con una canzone della medesima, a[‘] Prencipi Cristiani. The 28-page piece, addressed to Pope Clement VIII, includes a lengthy oration praising the pope for his peaceful takeover of the city of Ferrara earlier that year, and a canzone that forcefully criticizes both Henry IV of France and Philip II of Spain for their continuous fighting. Cervoni finishes her poem with a call for the princes of Europe to put down their arms and form a league in support of Clement's ambitions to fight again the Ottoman Empire.

Cervoni was also inducted into the prestigious Accademia degli Affidati in Pavia, most likely between 1598 and 1600—a rarity for women writers of any age in the period. It is not known when Cervoni died; there is no information available on her after 1600.

== List of works ==
=== Manuscripts ===
- "Canzone . . . sopra ’l felicissimo Natale del Ser[enissi]mo Prencipe di Toscana Magl. VII.138. Biblioteca Nazionale Centrale, Florence, 1590.

=== Printed works ===
- Canzone . . . sopra il battesimo del serenissimo gran prencipe di Toscana. Florence: Sermartelli, 1592.
- Canzone . . . al christianissimo Enrico Quarto, re di Francia . . . sopra la sua conversione. Florence: Giorgio Marescotti, 1597a.
- Canzone . . . al santissimo padre e signor nostro, Papa Clemente VIII, sopra la beneditione del christianissimo Enrico Quarto, Re di Francia. Florence: Giorgio Marescotti, 1597b.
- Orazione . . . al santissimo, e beatissimo padre, e signor nostro Papa Clemente ottavo, sopra l’impresa di Ferrara. Con una canzone . . . a’ prencipi christiani. Bologna: Giovanni Battista Bellagamba, 1598.
- Tre canzoni . . . in laude de’ Christianiss[imi] Re, e Regina di Francia, e di Navarra, Enrico Quarto, e Madama Maria de’ Medici. Florence: Giorgio Marescotti. 1600.

=== Poetry in other volumes ===
- “Di sostenere homai, qual nuovo Atlante” in Oratione, e poemi de gli Affidati nella morte del catolico Filippo II, re di Spagna. Pavia: Eredi di Girolamo Bartoli, 1599.
- “Mentr’à la Gloria i pensier vostri alzate” in Cervoni, Giovanni. Discorso in laude de la christianissima madama Maria de’Medici. Florence: Giorgio Marescotti, 1600.

Several pieces of correspondence verse between Cervoni and Massini, including poems pertaining to her acceptance into the Affidati, in Massini, Filippo. Rime. Pavia: Andrea Viani, 1609.
