= Coneo, Colle di Val d'Elsa =

Coneo
- Frazione
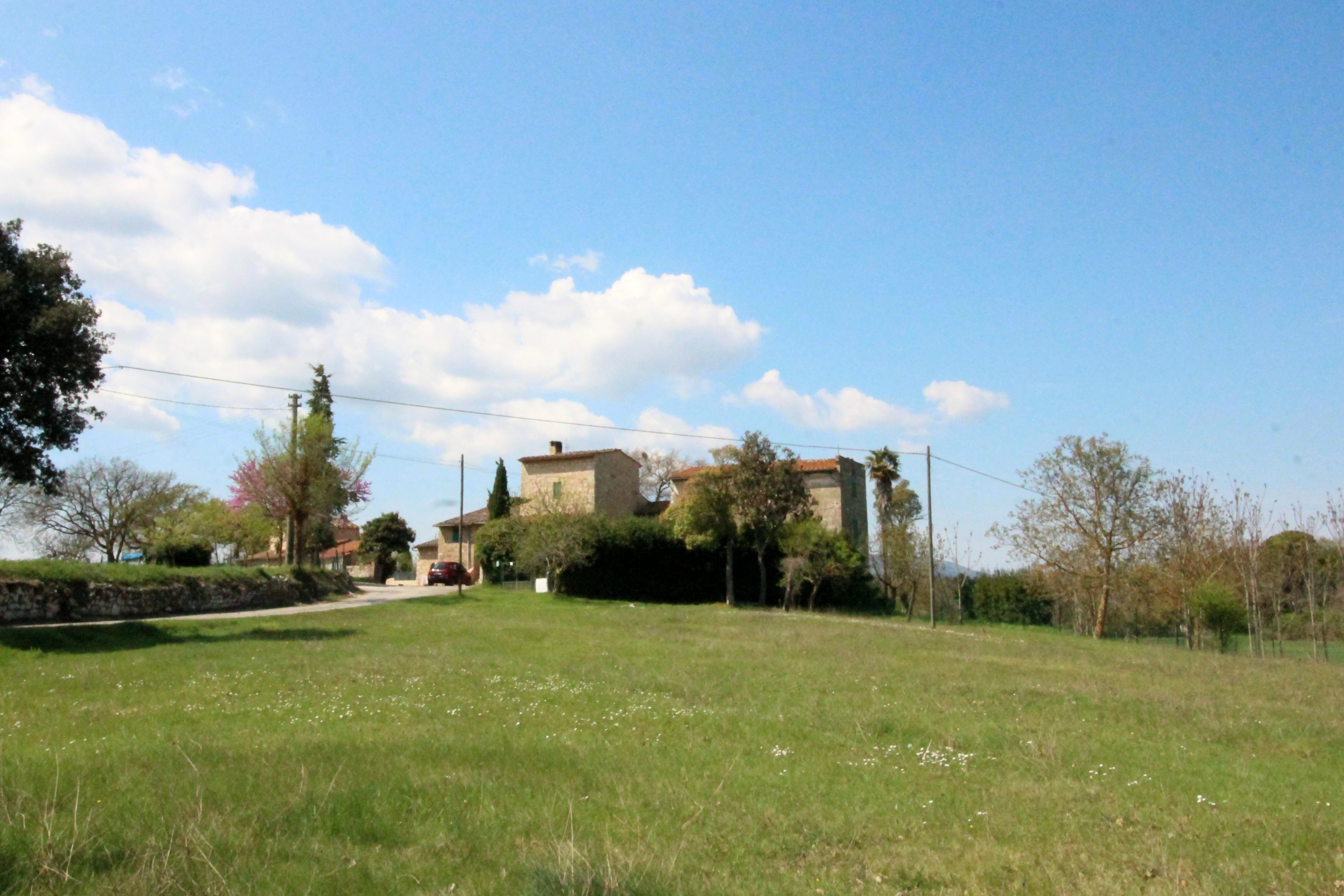

- Location of Coneo in Italy
- Coordinates: 43°24′1″N 11°4′49″E
- Country: Italy
- Region: Tuscany
- Province: Siena (SI)
- Comune: Colle di Val d'Elsa
- Elevation: 237 m (778 ft)

Population (2011)
  - Total: 42
- Time zone: UTC+1 (CET)
  - Summer (DST): UTC+2 (CEST)

Coneo is a village in Tuscany, central Italy, located in the comune of Colle di Val d'Elsa, province of Siena. At the time of the 2001 census its population was 51.
