= Certaldo =

- Comune
- Comune di Certaldo
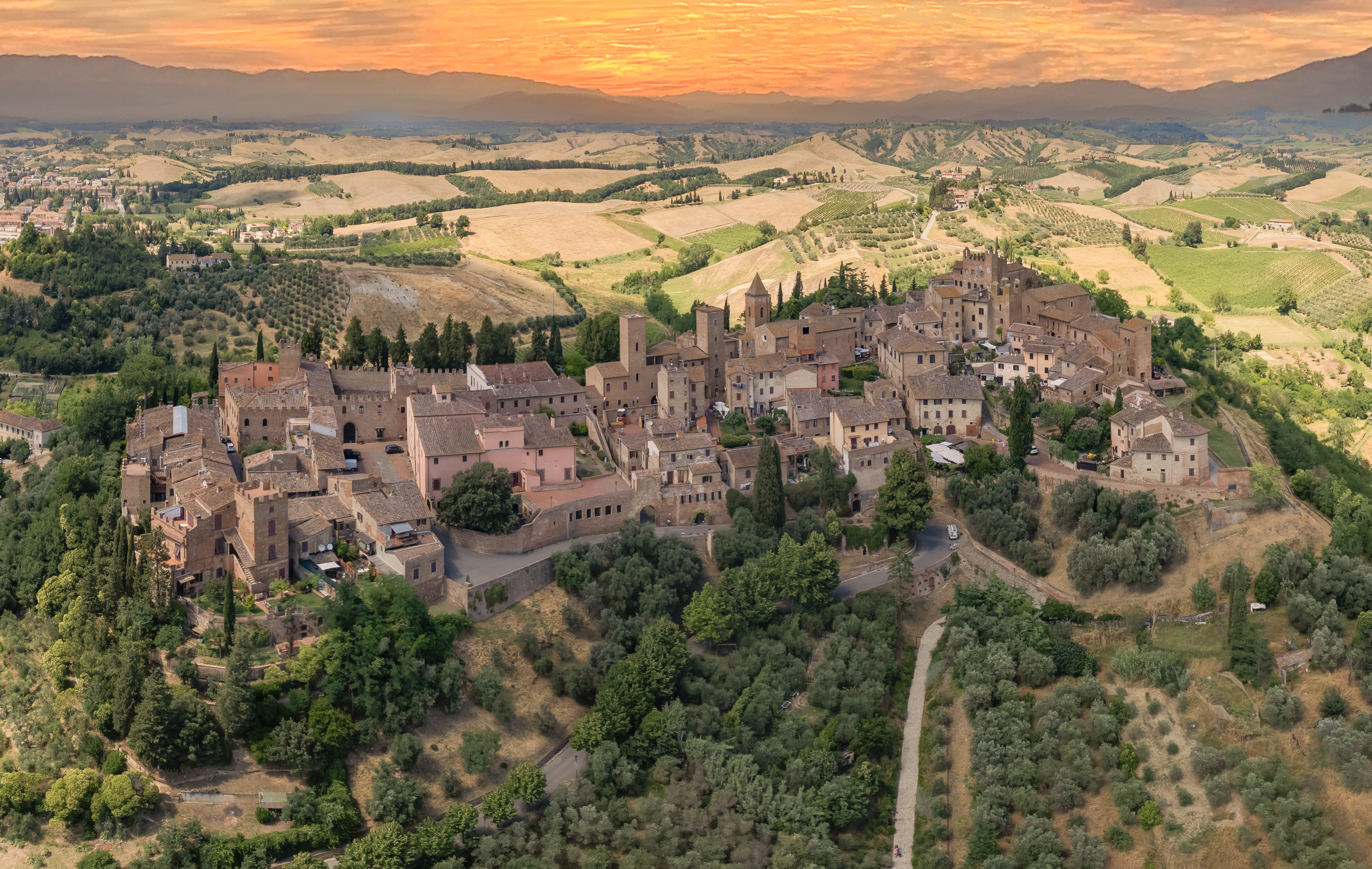

- Coat of arms

- Location within Italy Location within Tuscany
- Coordinates: 43°32′52″N 11°2′28″E
- Country: Italy
- Region: Tuscany
- Metropolitan city: Florence (FI)
- Frazioni: Bagnano, Fiano, Marcialla (part), Sciano

Government
  - Mayor: Giovanni Campatelli (PD)

Area
  - Total: 75.28 km^{2} (29.07 sq mi)
- Elevation: 67 m (220 ft)

Population (30 June 2017)
  - Total: 16,004
  - Density: 212.6/km^{2} (550.6/sq mi)
- Demonym: Certaldesi
- Time zone: UTC+1 (CET)
  - Summer (DST): UTC+2 (CEST)
- Postal code: 50052
- Dialing code: 0571
- Patron saint: St. Thomas the Apostle
- Saint day: July 3
- Website: Official website

Certaldo (Italian pronunciation: [tʃerˈtaldo]) is a town and comune (municipality) of Tuscany, Italy, in the Metropolitan City of Florence, located in the middle of Valdelsa. It is about 35 kilometres (22 mi) southwest of the Florence Cathedral (50 minutes by rail and 35 minutes by car from the city), and 40 minutes by rail north of Siena.

It was home to the family of Giovanni Boccaccio, author of the Decameron, who was possibly born and died at his home in Certaldo, being buried there in 1375. It is also the birthplace of actor Ernesto Calindri and of football manager Luciano Spalletti.

== Geography ==
The town of Certaldo is divided into upper and lower parts. The lower part is called Certaldo Basso, whilst the medieval upper part is called Certaldo Alto. Certaldo Alto has limited vehicular access, for use by residents only. Visitors can park outside the walls or in the lower part and go to Certaldo Alto by the Certaldo funicular.

== History ==
=== Etruscan-Roman period ===
Certaldo had Etruscan-Roman origins, as shown by the numerous archaeological finds that are scattered around the city's territory, including ceramics, utensils and Etruscan tombs, some of which were found just recently. The Etruscan origins were discovered mostly thanks to the toponymy of some localities and streams, for example the Agliena and the Elsa river (which flow near Certaldo), and the foodstuffs deposits in the hills. There are two hills in Certaldo where Etruscan tombs have been found, Poggio del Boccaccio and Poggio alle Fate. There was also a necropolis. All of the finds of Etruscan-Roman origin are today kept in the ground floor of the Palazzo Pretorio, in the medieval part of the town.

- Boccaccio's house, of red brick, like the other old houses here, was restored in 1823 and furnished with old furniture. A statue of him was erected in the main square in 1875.
- The Palazzo Pretorio, or Vicariale, the residence of the Florentine governors, recently restored to its original condition, has a picturesque facade adorned with ceramic coats of arms, and in the interior are various frescoes dating from the 13th to the 16th century.

== Culture ==
The town hosts several festivals a year. The largest and most famous is Mercantia, a week-long party in Certaldo Alto. It involves numerous street performers from across Italy, Europe and the Americas.

== Municipal government ==
Certaldo is headed by a mayor (sindaco) assisted by a legislative body, the consiglio comunale, and an executive body, the giunta comunale. Since 1995 the mayor and members of the consiglio comunale are directly elected together by resident citizens, while from 1945 to 1995 the mayor was chosen by the legislative body. The giunta comunale is chaired by the mayor, who appoints others members, called assessori. The offices of the comune are housed in a building usually called the municipio or palazzo comunale.

Since 1995 the mayor of Certaldo is directly elected by citizens, originally every four, then every five years. The current mayor is Giovanni Campatelli (PD), elected on 10 June 2024 with the 51.2% of the votes.

Mayor	Term start	Term end	Party
Rosalba Spini Ciampoli	24 April 1995	14 June 2004	PDS; DS
Andrea Campinoti	14 June 2004	9 June 2014	DS; PD
Giacomo Cucini	9 June 2014	10 June 2024	PD
Giovanni Campatelli	10 June 2024	incumbent	PD

== Twin towns ==
- Neuruppin, Germany
- Kanramachi, Japan
- Canterbury, United Kingdom
