= Lano, Colle di Val d'Elsa =

Lano
- Frazione
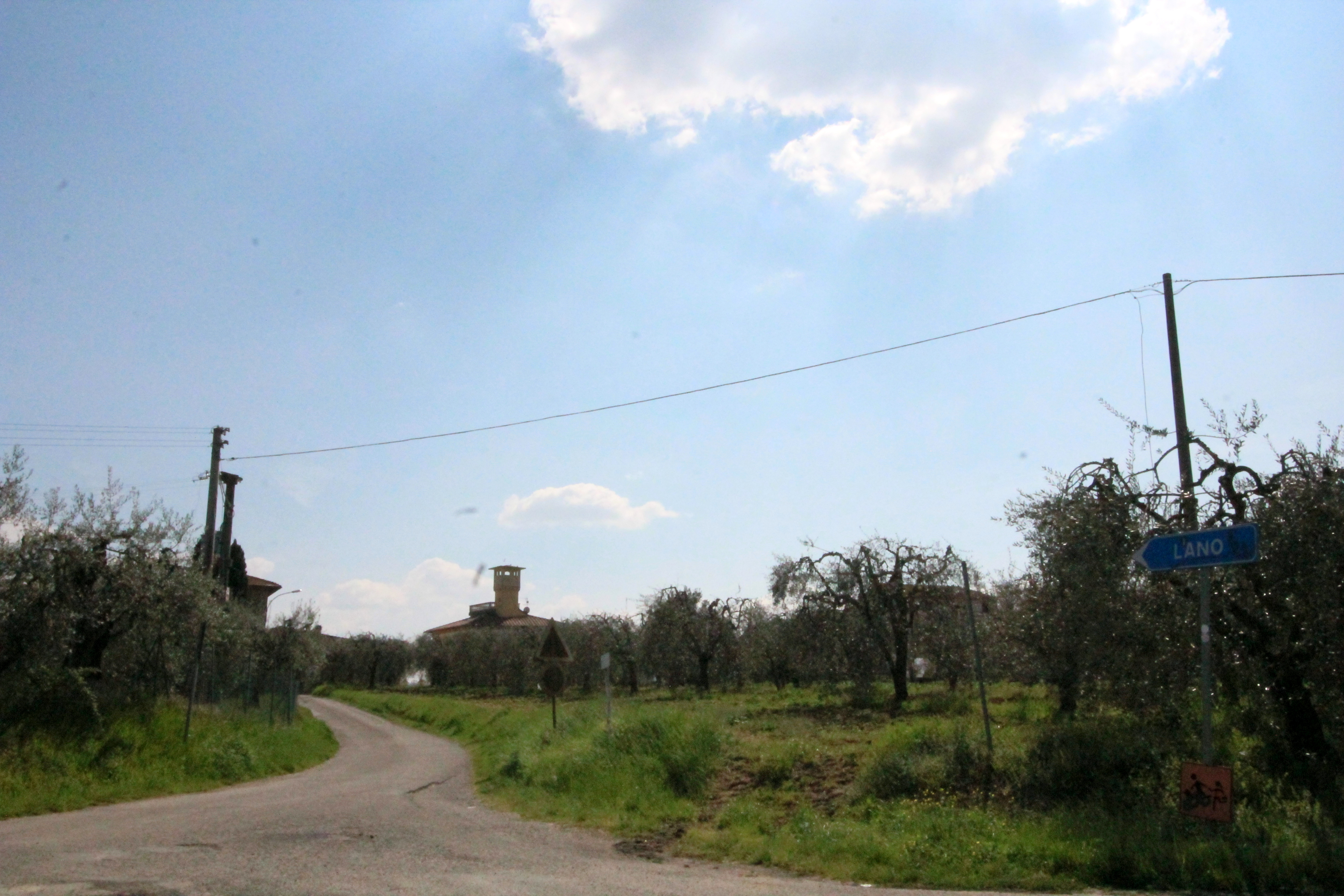

- Location of Lano in Italy
- Coordinates: 43°22′23″N 11°5′49″E
- Country: Italy
- Region: Tuscany
- Province: Siena (SI)
- Comune: Colle di Val d'Elsa
- Elevation: 277 m (909 ft)

Population (2011)
  - Total: 61
- Time zone: UTC+1 (CET)
  - Summer (DST): UTC+2 (CEST)

Lano is a village in Tuscany, central Italy, located in the comune of Colle di Val d'Elsa, province of Siena. At the time of the 2001 census its population was 53.
