= Le Grazie, Colle di Val d'Elsa =

Le Grazie
- Frazione
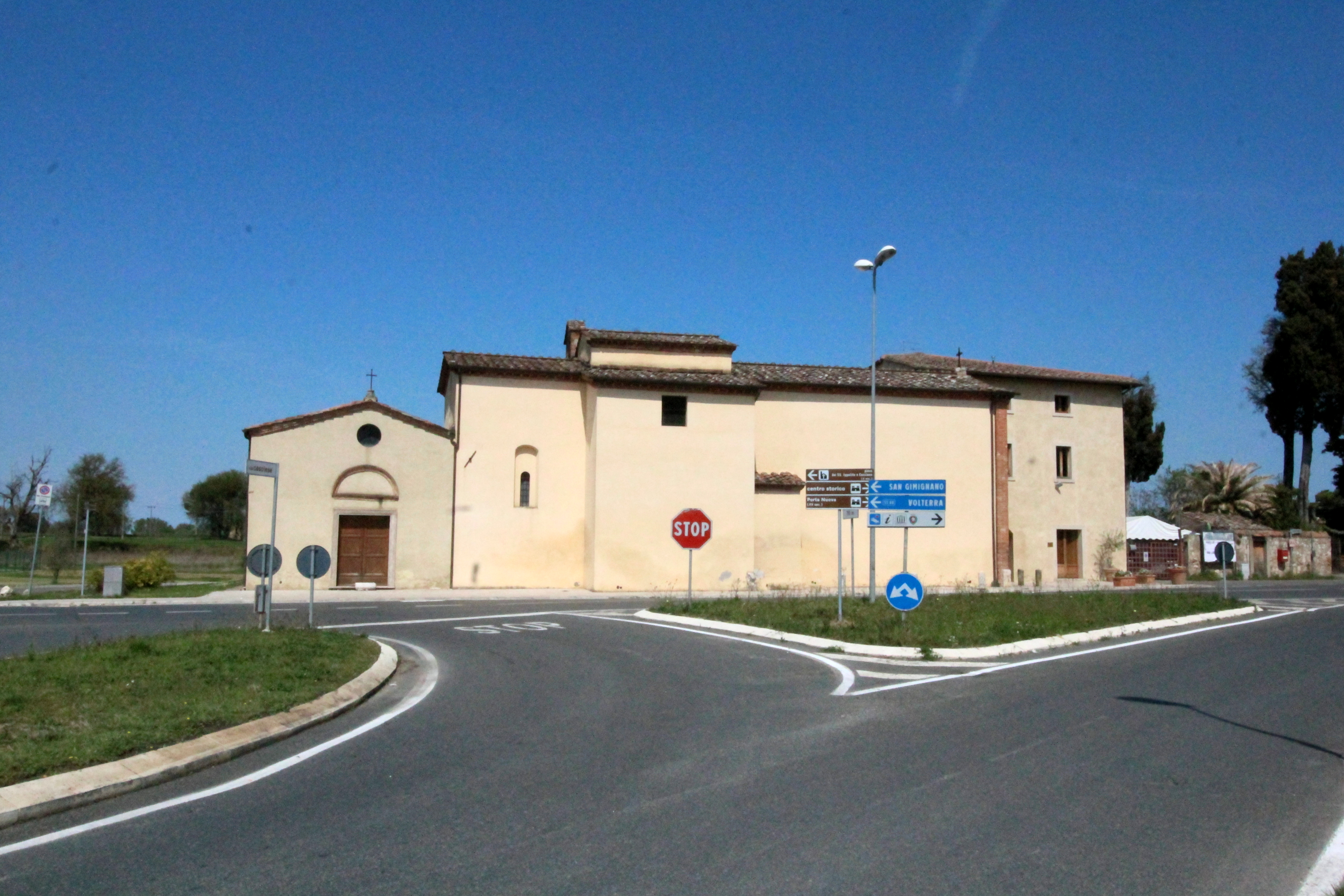
- The sanctuary of Santa Maria delle Grazie

- Location of Le Grazie in Italy
- Coordinates: 43°25′2″N 11°6′3″E
- Country: Italy
- Region: Tuscany
- Province: Siena (SI)
- Comune: Colle di Val d'Elsa
- Elevation: 241 m (791 ft)

Population (2018)
  - Total: 2,171
- Time zone: UTC+1 (CET)
  - Summer (DST): UTC+2 (CEST)

Le Grazie is a village in Tuscany, central Italy, administratively a frazione of the comune of Colle di Val d'Elsa, province of Siena. At the time of the 2018 parish census its population was 2,171.
