= Onci =

- Frazione
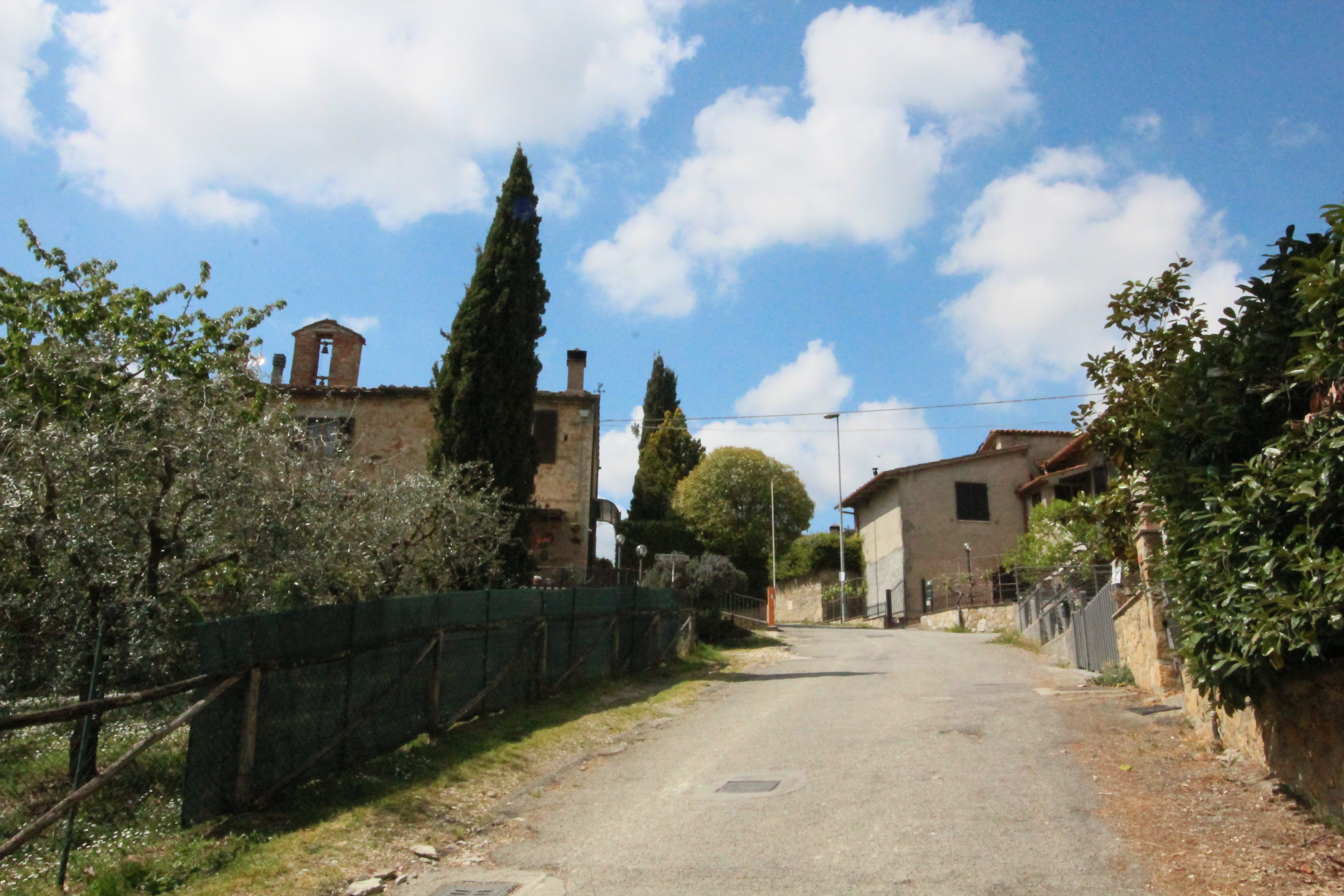

- Location of Onci in Italy
- Coordinates: 43°23′39″N 11°7′17″E
- Country: Italy
- Region: Tuscany
- Province: Siena (SI)
- Comune: Colle di Val d'Elsa
- Elevation: 204 m (669 ft)

Population (2011)
  - Total: 36
- Time zone: UTC+1 (CET)
  - Summer (DST): UTC+2 (CEST)

Onci is a village in Tuscany, central Italy, located in the comune of Colle di Val d'Elsa, province of Siena. At the time of the 2001 census its population was 25.
