= Isola, San Miniato =

Isola
- Frazione
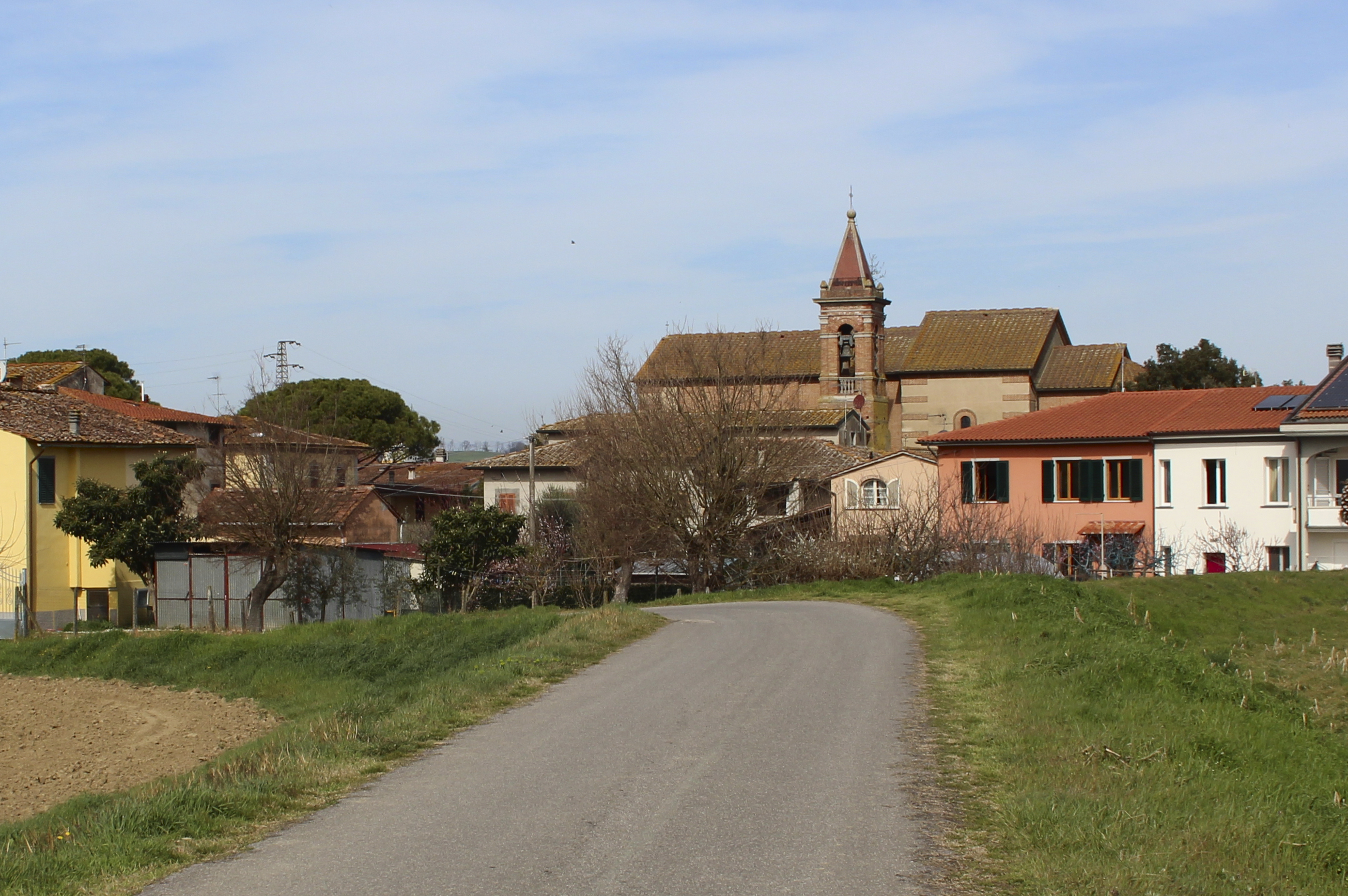

- Location of Isola in Italy
- Coordinates: 43°42′49″N 10°52′34″E
- Country: Italy
- Region: Tuscany
- Province: Pisa (PI)
- Comune: San Miniato
- Elevation: 22 m (72 ft)

Population (2011)
  - Total: 639
- Demonym: Isolani
- Time zone: UTC+1 (CET)
  - Summer (DST): UTC+2 (CEST)
- Postal code: 56028
- Dialing code: (+39) 0571

Isola is a village in Tuscany, central Italy, administratively a frazione of the comune of San Miniato, province of Pisa. At the time of the 2001 census its population was 536.

Isola is about 52 km from Pisa and 4 km from San Miniato.
