= Mensanello =

- Frazione
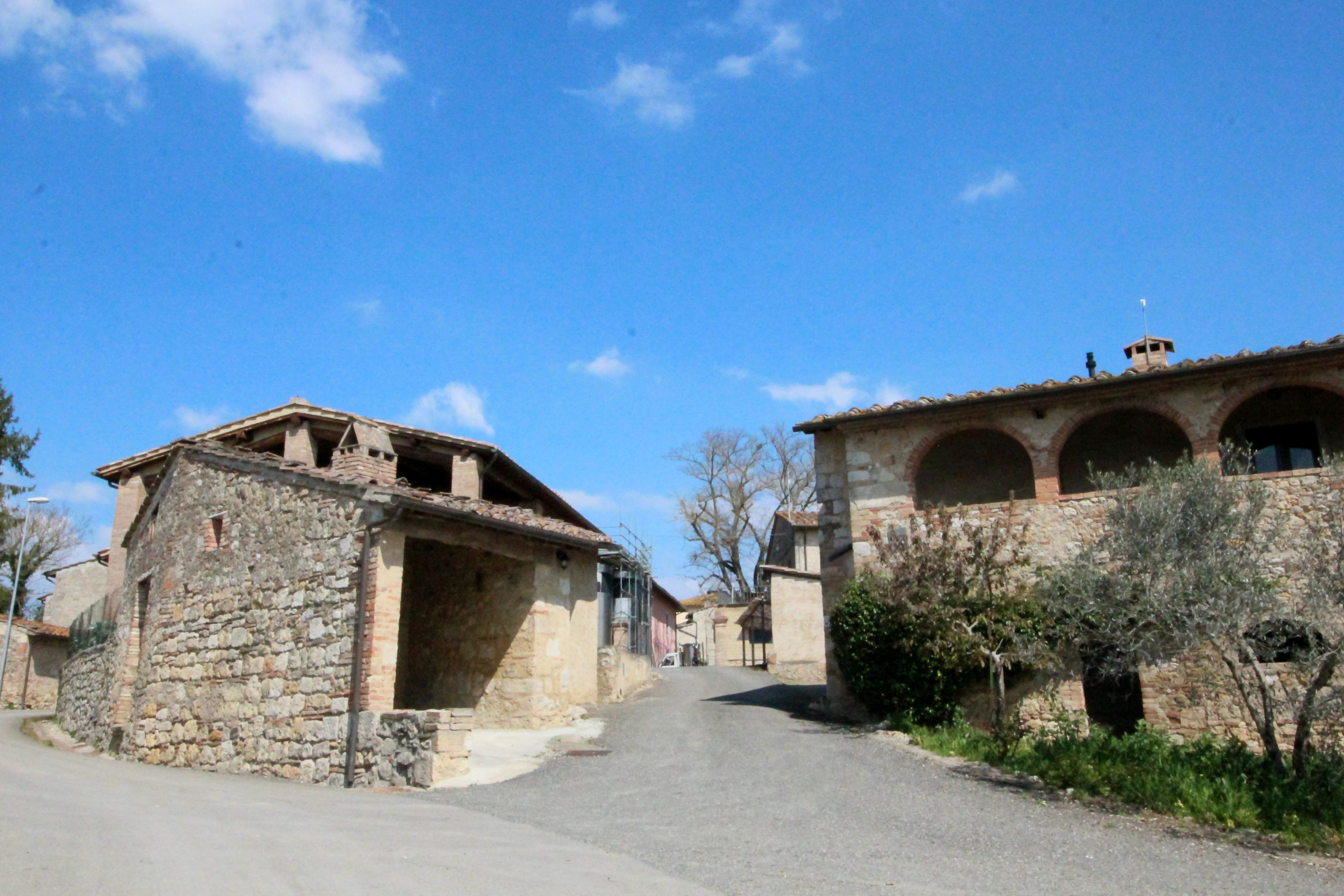

- Location of Mensanello in Italy
- Coordinates: 43°22′48″N 11°7′8″E
- Country: Italy
- Region: Tuscany
- Province: Siena (SI)
- Comune: Colle di Val d'Elsa
- Elevation: 247 m (810 ft)

Population (2011)
  - Total: 27
- Time zone: UTC+1 (CET)
  - Summer (DST): UTC+2 (CEST)

Mensanello is a village in Tuscany, central Italy, administratively a frazione of the comune of Colle di Val d'Elsa, province of Siena. At the time of the 2001 census its population was 42.
