= Gracciano dell'Elsa =

- Frazione
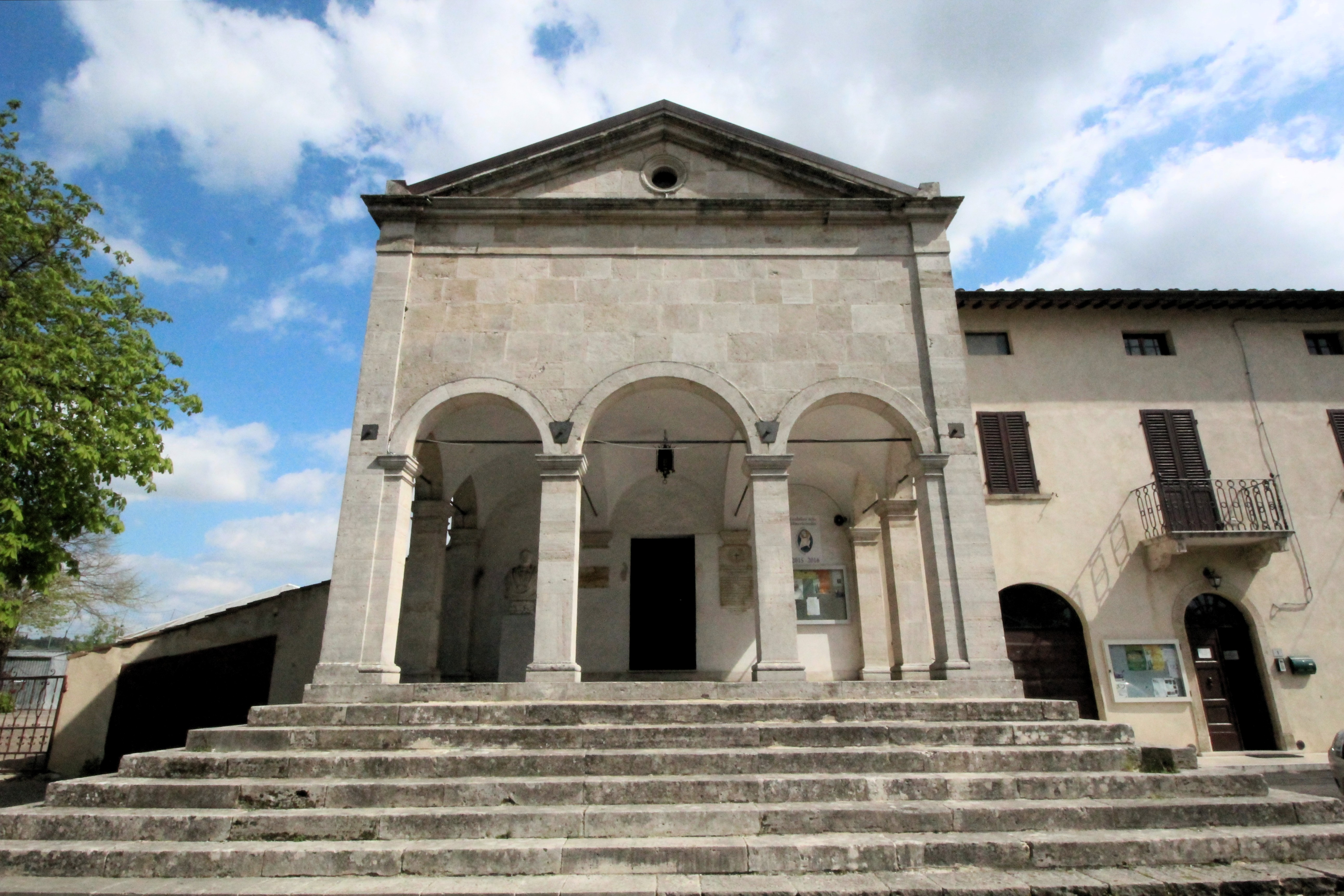
- The church of San Marziale in Gracciano dell'Elsa

- Location of Gracciano dell'Elsa in Italy
- Coordinates: 43°23′43″N 11°7′59″E
- Country: Italy
- Region: Tuscany
- Province: Siena (SI)
- Comune: Colle di Val d'Elsa
- Elevation: 173 m (568 ft)

Population (2011)
  - Total: 2,650
- Demonym: Graccianesi
- Time zone: UTC+1 (CET)
  - Summer (DST): UTC+2 (CEST)

Gracciano dell'Elsa is a village in Tuscany, central Italy, administratively a frazione of the comune of Colle di Val d'Elsa, province of Siena.

Gracciano dell'Elsa is about 26 km from Siena and 2 km from Colle di Val d'Elsa.
