= Pucci =

Pucci may refer to:

- Pucci, formerly Emilio Pucci, the name of an Italian fashion brand.
- Pucci of Pitigliano, the only cadet branch of the House of Pucci.
- Members of the Pucci family, a major Florentine political family
  - Antonio di Puccio Pucci (c. 1350 – after 1416), Florentine politician and architect
  - Puccio Pucci (politician) (1389–1449), Florentine politician, son of Antonio
  - Lorenzo Pucci (1458–1531), Italian cardinal
  - Roberto Pucci (1462–1547), Italian cardinal
  - Antonio Pucci (cardinal) (1485–1544), Italian cardinal
  - Francesco Pucci (politician) (1437–1518), Florentine politician
  - Pandolfo Pucci (died 2 January 1560), responsible for the Pucci plot
  - Orazio Roberto Pucci (1625–1698), first Marchese di Barsento
  - Emilio Pucci (1914–1992), fashion designer and politician
  - Idanna Pucci (born 1945), Italian writer and documentary filmmaker
- Albert John Pucci (1920–2005), American multi-genre visual artist
- Alessandra Pucci (born 1942), Australian biochemist and entrepreneur
- Antonio Pucci (poet) (c. 1310–1388), Florentine poet
- Antonio Maria Pucci (1819–1892), Italian saint
- Antonio Pucci (driver) (1923–2009), Italian race driver
- Ben Pucci (1925–2013), professional American football tackle
- Elda Pucci (1928–2005), Italian politician and professor
- Enrico Pucci (JoJo's Bizarre Adventure), fictional character from JoJo's Bizarre Adventure
- Enrico Pucci (1900–date of death unknown), Italian weightlifter
- Francesco Pucci (archbishop), archbishop of Pisa in 1362
- Frank Pucci (1966–2018), American musician
- Josephine Pucci (born 1990), women's ice hockey player
- Lou Taylor Pucci (born 1985), American actor
- Luciano Pucci Burti (born 1975), Brazilian racing driver
- Michael Pucci (born 1963), Australian politician
- Puccio Pucci (1904–1985), Italian athlete (middle-distance runner), lawyer and sports official
- Ralph Pucci (born 1954), American mannequin designer, gallery owner and entrepreneur
