= The Story of Nastagio Degli Onesti, part one =

Painting by Sandro Botticelli

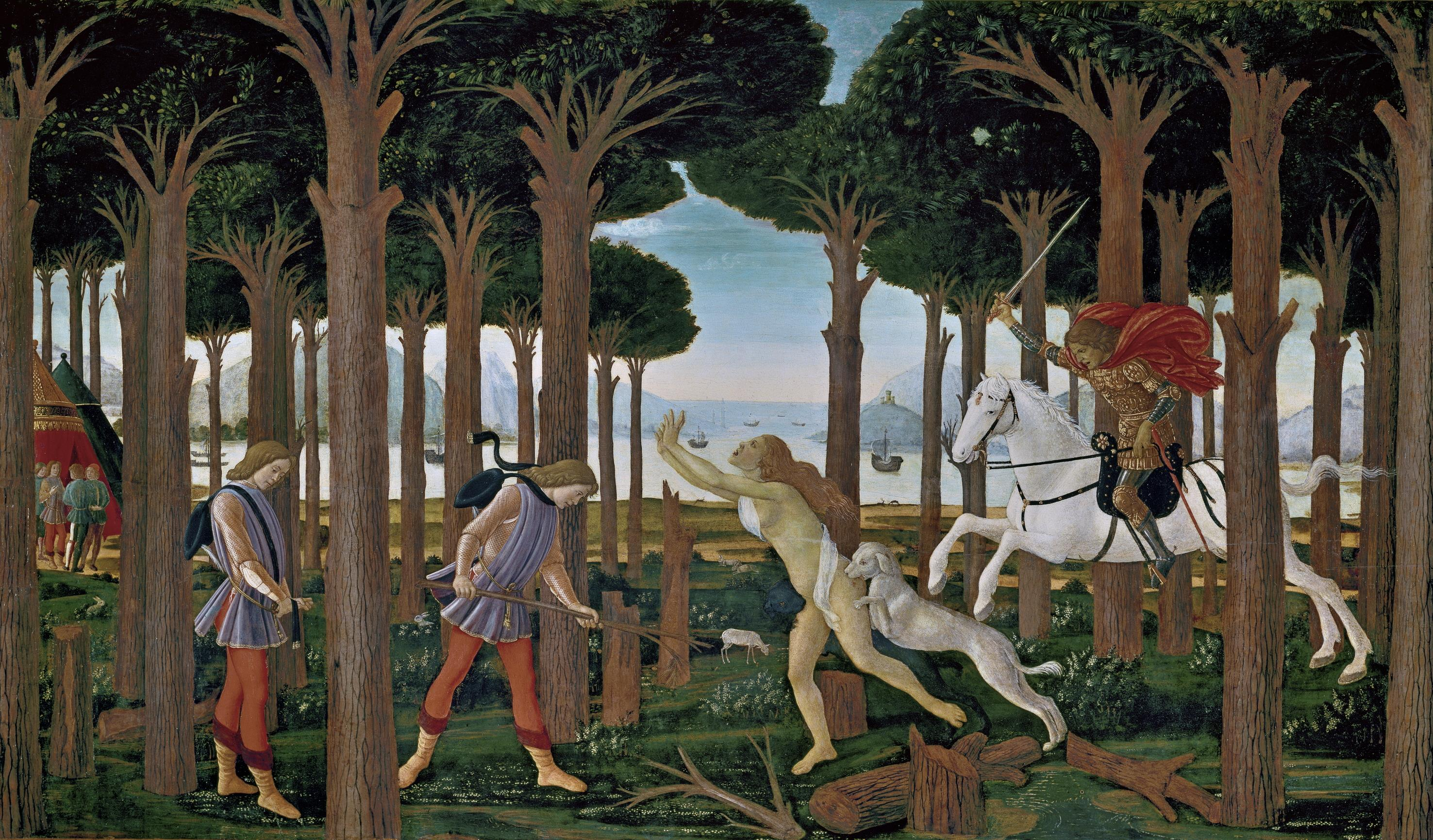
The Story of Nastagio Degli Onesti, part one

The Story of Nastagio Degli Onesti, part one is a painting in tempera on wood by the Italian Renaissance master Sandro Botticelli, dated 1483. It measures 83 × 138 cm and is in the Museo del Prado in Madrid.

== History ==
The picture is one of a series of four, "commissioned on the occasion of the marriage [in 1483] of Giannozzo Pucci (1460–1497) and Lucrezia di Piero Bini". The four were held in the Palazzo Pucci in Florence until 1868, when they were sold. The first three are now in the Prado, and the last one is now in original location after having spent some time in the Watney Collection in Charlbury, Oxfordshire, England.

== Description and style ==
The story of Nastagio degli Onesti, a nobleman of Ravenna, is the eighth tale of the fifth day in The Decameron by Giovanni Boccaccio. This theme was chosen for its happy ending to a love affair, in which the daughter of Paolo Traversari, who rejects Nastagio's courting, changes her mind after witnessing the infernal punishment of another woman guilty of the same sin of ingratitude towards her lover.

The first episode of the story is set in a pine wood around Ravenna, the city where the story takes place. Nastagio has left the city, disappointed by his unreturned affection, and wanders alone and sorrowful. He is surprised by the sudden appearance of a woman being chased by a knight and his dogs, which seize her in their teeth in spite of Nastagio's attempts to defend her.

On the left in the painting are some tents, in which Nastagio (in the red hose) is seen being advised by his friends to leave town for a while. Then Nastagio is shown in close-up, roaming the forest. He appears again nearby with a stick, seeking to drive away the dogs that are trying to bite a half-naked woman, chased by a dashing knight with a sword and golden armour.

The scene has a strong narrative character, showing successive scenes within one picture and requiring three representations of Nastagio, a typically late medieval procedure. The tall, upright trunks of the trees combine with the horizontal seascape in the background to form a kind of grid, giving a remarkable effect of depth. The drama combines with the formal elegance of the slender figures and the graceful gestures of people and animals to achieve a magical suspension between fable and reality. Although the conception of the four pictures is due to Botticelli, the execution was entrusted in part to his assistants, in particular Bartolomeo di Giovanni for the first three pictures and Jacopo da Sellaio for the fourth.
