= Antonio Pucci =

Antonio Pucci may refer to:

- Antonio Pucci (poet) (c. 1310–1388), Florentine poet
- Antonio di Puccio Pucci (c. 1350–after 1416), Florentine politician and architect
- Antonio Pucci (cardinal) (1485–1544), Italian cardinal
- Antonio Maria Pucci (1819–1892), Italian saint
- Antonio Pucci (racing driver) (1923–2009), Italian race driver
