= Palazzo Pucci =

Palazzo Pucci may refer to:

- Palazzo Pucci, Florence
- Palace of the Holy Office, Rome, originally built as Palazzo Pucci
