= Pucci family =

Political family of Florence, Italy

Pucci
- Noble House
- Arms of the House of Pucci
- Country: Republic of Florence; Grand Duchy of Tuscany; Kingdom of Italy; Italy
- Etymology: By Jacopo, later known as Jacopuccio or Puccio, considered the first ancestor of the house
- Founded: XIII century
- Founder: Antonio di Puccio Pucci
- Motto: Tempore Tempora Tempera ('mitigates the times over time')
- Estates: Palazzo Pucci, Florence; Palazzo Pucci, Rome; Palazzo Pucci, Ottavio; Villa Caruso di Bellosguardo; Villa Pucci; Castle of Oliveto
- Cadet branches: Pucci of Pitigliano; Pucci of Benisichi

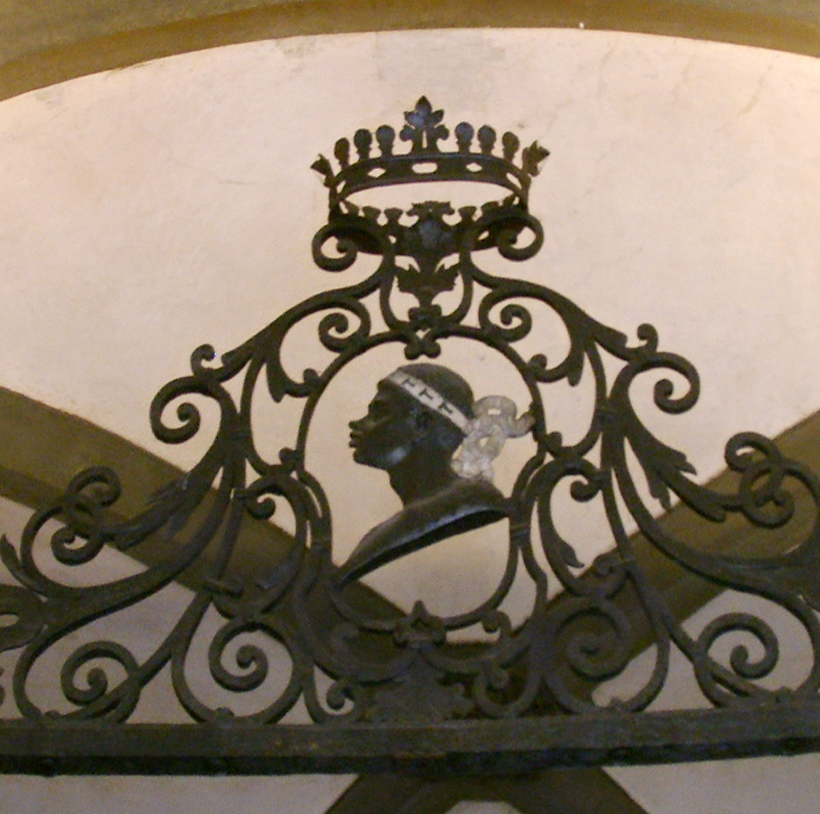
The Pucci family's emblem, with the moor's head

The Pucci family is an ancient aristocratic family from Florence. Among its members are religious figures, politicians and notable Florentines, as well as patrons of the arts, poets, and men of letters.

== History ==
The Pucci family name comes from an ancestor named Jacopo, later shortened to Puccio, a wise figure known for settling disputes in the late 13th century. The family likely originated in Siena before settling in Florence, where they first appeared in historical records during the 1200s. Early notable members included Antonio Pucci, an architect involved in building the Loggia della Signoria, and his son, Puccio Pucci, a successful merchant who grew wealthy through trade in medieval Florence.

The Puccis supported the Guelphs, leading to their exile after the Battle of Montaperti in 1260, though they returned when the Ghibellines were driven out. Their wealth brought political power, and they held numerous high offices, including 23 priors and eight Gonfaloniere di Giustizia positions. During the Renaissance, they became close allies of the Medici family, with figures like Puccio Pucci aiding Cosimo de' Medici during his imprisonment. In the early 16th century, the family’s status peaked, producing three cardinals: Roberto, Lorenzo, and Antonio.

A brief rift with the Medici occurred in 1559 when Pandolfo Pucci plotted against Cosimo I to restore the Republic of Florence. The failed conspiracy led to his execution and the family’s temporary downfall, but they later reconciled with the Medici and regained their standing. In 1662, Orazio Roberto Pucci bought the title of Marchese di Barsento, which remains in the family.

A branch of the family, known as the Pucci of Pitigliano, originated in 1607 with the marriage between Lorenzo Pucci and Ersilia Orsini, sister of Count Giannantonio Orsini, the last Count of the County of Pitigliano. The marriage was arranged to preserve the name and legacy of the Orsini family, which had ruled Pitigliano for about two centuries. Although the title of count was no longer legally recognized after the annexation to the Grand Duchy of Tuscany, the Pucci di Pitigliano lineage retained a symbolic and cultural noble role tied to that territory. Descendants of this family branch still exist today.

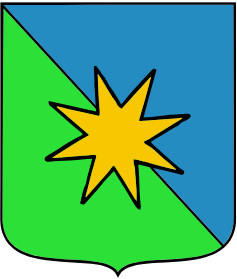
Coat of Arms of the Pucci of Pitigliano cadet branch.

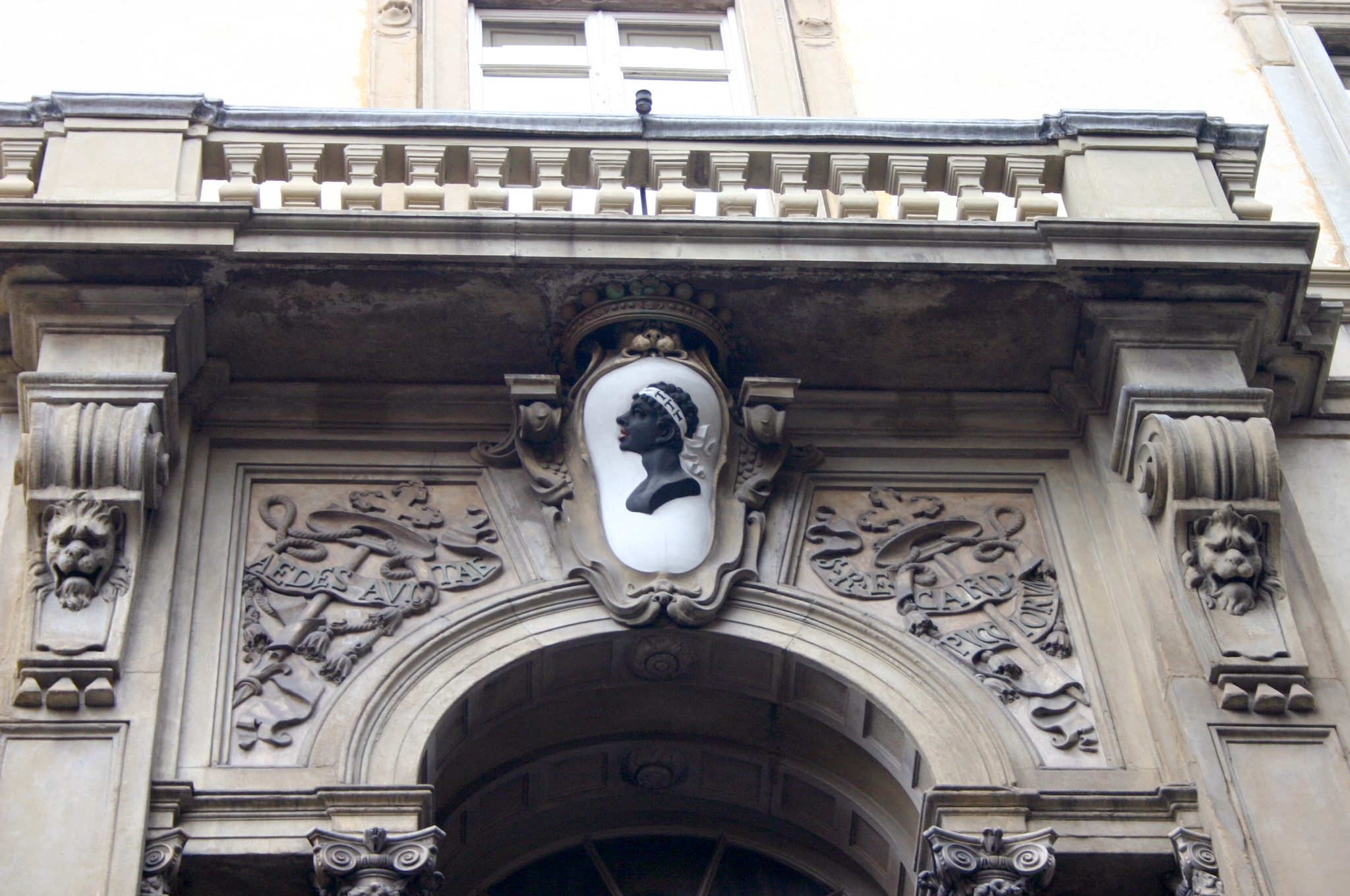
The Pucci family's coat of arms at the Palazzo Pucci in Florence

The most recent notable family member is Emilio Pucci, founder of the namesake post-war fashion house, who became famous in the 1960s for his prints, fabrics, and designs. His brother, Puccio Pucci di Barsento, a lawyer and architect, served during WWII as a pilot in the acrobatic squadron of the Italian Air Force. In the 1960s, the two brothers split the Palazzo Pucci, with Emilio taking the left half as the main base for his fashion house. Puccio took the most ancient part, with the central entrance, restoring it and adapting it to the needs of the time with a gallery of artisan workshops that is still thriving today.

== Patronage ==
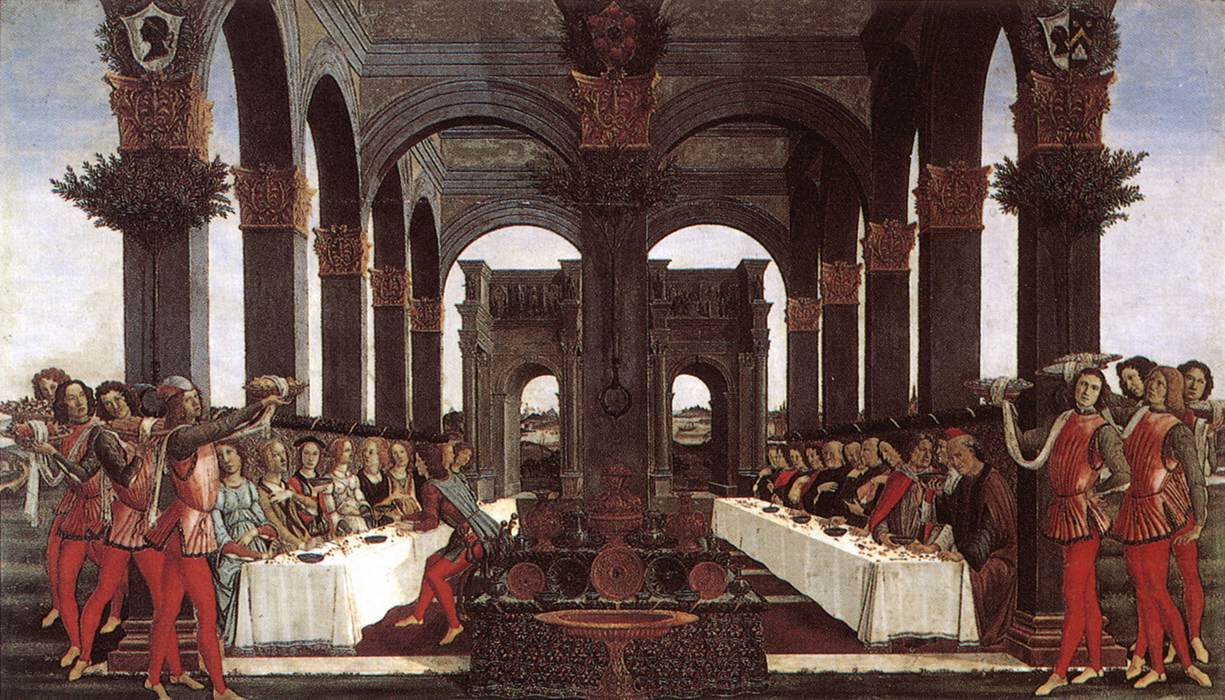
Nastagio degli Onesti, fourth panel, Sandro Botticelli

Puccio Pucci in 1445 showed interest acquiring the main chapel of the still-to-be constructed tribune of the SS. Annunziata (the later site of the Cappella della Madonna del Soccorso). From 1452, his son, Antonio Pucci began to contribute funds to the construction of the Oratory of San Sebastiano of the church of Santissima Annunziata, for which he commissioned Piero del Pollaiuolo's painting of the Martyrdom of Saint Sebastian (now in the National Gallery, London).The family also collected art, including four paintings commissioned by Lorenzo the Magnificent from Sandro Botticelli as a gift to Giannozzo Pucci on Giannozzo's marriage to Lucrezia Bini in 1483. These paintings tell the story of Nastalgio degli Onesti and the first three in the narrative are now in the Prado in Madrid. The paintings show the use of forks, which were traditionally adopted for the first time in Florence by the Pucci, who can be considered the family that invented the fork, and whose use Catherine de'Medici then spread across Europe. It also depicts the actual tableware and silver vessels used by the family, which were allegedly from the workshops of Verrocchio and Pollaiolo.

The Pucci commissioned several works for the churches neighbouring their palazzo. For the church of San Michele Visdomini, in 1518 Francesco Pucci commissioned Pontormo to paint the Holy family with saints, which was described by Vasari as one of the best paintings by an Empolese painter. Whilst he was archbishop of Bologna, cardinal Antonio Pucci commissioned Raphael to paint a scene of The Ecstasy of Saint Cecilia - now moved to the city's Pinacoteca. At the end of the 16th century, Lorenzo Pucci commissioned Alessandro Allori to paint a Marriage at Cana as an altarpiece for the church of Sant'Agata (completed 1600).

The family's palazzo was rebuilt by the grand-ducal architect Bernardo Buontalenti in the second half of the 16th century. Between 1585 and 1595 abbot Alessandro Pucci built the Villa di Bellosguardo, to designs by Giovanni Antonio Dosio - it remained a family property until 1858. The Pucci completed the portico of the church of Santissima Annunziata, in a stylistic unity with the piazza outside (the Pucci device is to be seen on the pavement in front of the entrance and on both sides of the portico) - an inscription on the frieze and a plaque on Via Gino Capponi gives its completion date as 1601.

=== Works linked to the Pucci family ===
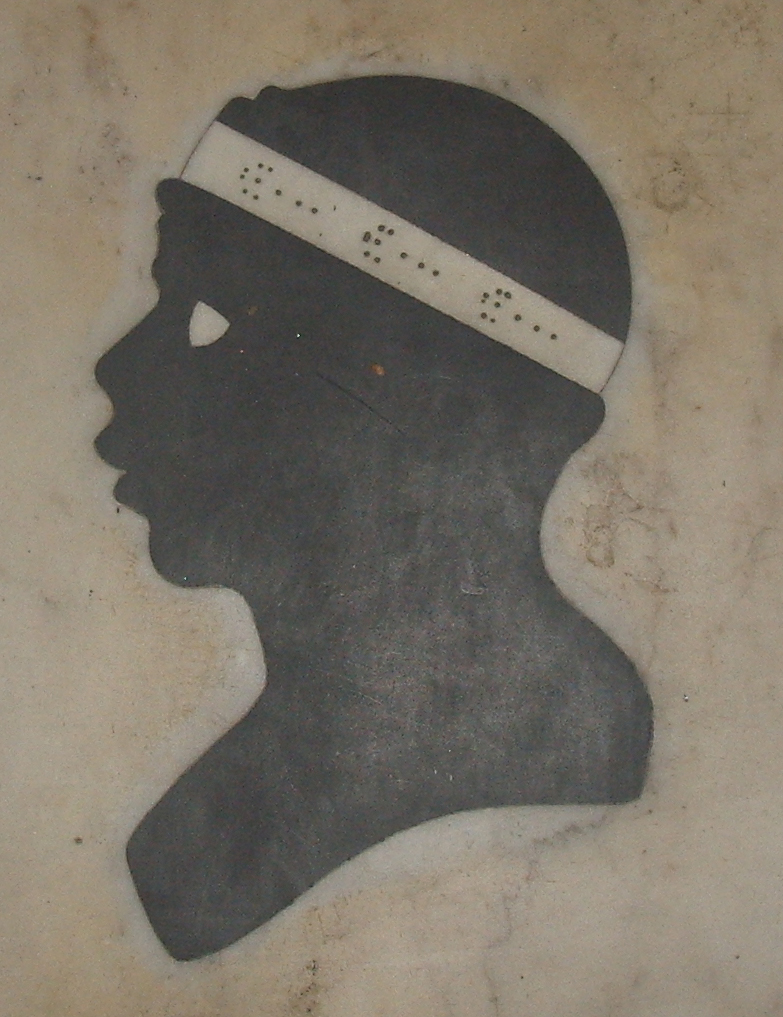
The Pucci emblem on the floor of Santissima Annunziata - the headband originally bore three hammers (symbol of the family's ancestral profession), later replaced by three Ts to represent the acronym of the family motto Tempore tempora tempera ("time is a great healer")

- Palazzo Pucci, Florence
- Palazzo Pucci, Rome
- Palazzo Pucci di Ottavio
- Basilica Church of the Santissima Annunziata, Florence
- Church of San Michele Visdomini
- Church of Sant'Agata
- Castello di Oliveto (built by the Pucci in the 15th century)
- Villa di Bellosguardo

== Notable members ==
Its members included:

- Antonio di Puccio Pucci (c. 1350–1416), Florentine politician and architect
- Puccio Pucci (1389–1449), Florentine politician, son of Antonio
- Giannozzo Pucci (15th century), whose marriage to Lucrezia Bini was the occasion for the painting of the Nastagio degli Onesti
- Francesco Pucci (Florence 1437–1518), Florentine politician, commissioned a work from Jacopo Pontormo
- Lorenzo Pucci (1458–1531), Italian cardinal
- Roberto Pucci (1462–1547), Italian cardinal
- Antonio Pucci (cardinal) (1485–1544), Italian cardinal
- Pandolfo Pucci (d. 2 January 1560), responsible for the Pucci plot
- Lorenzo Pucci (16th–17th century), notable figure,he was also the founder of the Pucci branch of Pitigliano.
- Orazio Roberto Pucci (Florence, 1625–1698), first Marchese di Barsento
- Emilio Pucci (Naples 1914 – Florence 1992), fashion designer and politician

== Bibliography ==
- (in Italian) Marcello Vannucci, Le grandi famiglie di Firenze, Newton Compton Editori, 2006 ISBN 88-8289-531-9
