= Puccio Pucci =

Puccio Pucci may refer to:

- Puccio Pucci (politician) (1389–1449), Florentine politician and the founder of the main branch of the Pucci family
- Puccio Pucci (lawyer) (1904–1985), Italian Olympic athlete, lawyer and sports official
