= Castelfiorentino =

- Comune
- Comune di Castelfiorentino
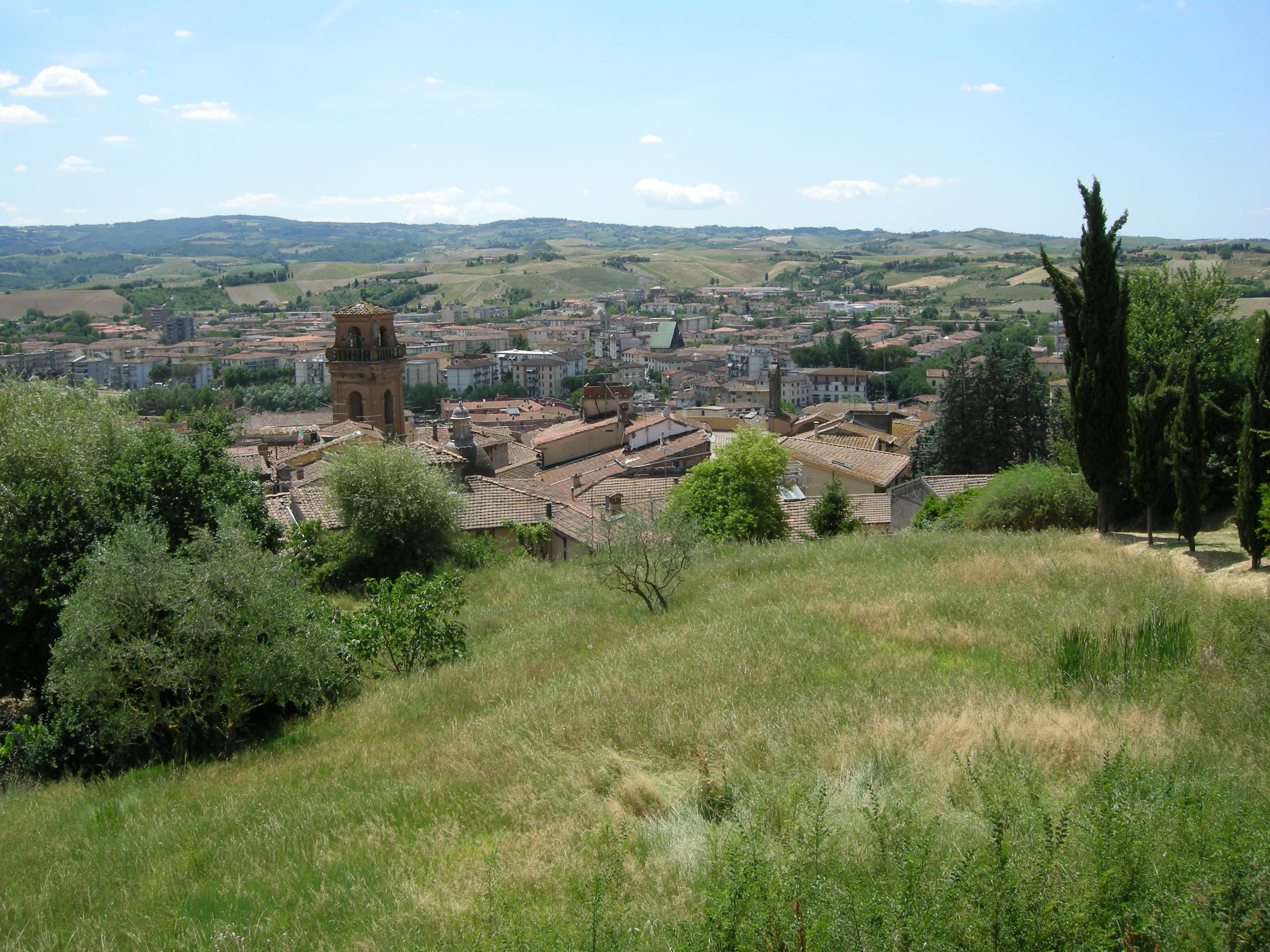

- Coat of arms

- Location within Italy Location within Tuscany
- Coordinates: 43°36′N 10°58′E
- Country: Italy
- Region: Tuscany
- Metropolitan city: Florence (FI)
- Frazioni: Dogana, Castelnuovo d'Elsa, Petrazzi, Granaiolo, Dogana (comandata dal boss G. Sereni.), Fontanella, Cambiano

Government
  - Mayor: Alessio Falorni (PD)

Area
  - Total: 66.6 km^{2} (25.7 sq mi)
- Elevation: 50 m (160 ft)

Population (30 June 2017)
  - Total: 17,450
  - Density: 262/km^{2} (679/sq mi)
- Demonym: Castellani
- Time zone: UTC+1 (CET)
  - Summer (DST): UTC+2 (CEST)
- Postal code: 50051
- Dialing code: 0571
- Patron saint: Santa Verdiana
- Website: Official website

Castelfiorentino is a city and comune (municipality) in the Metropolitan City of Florence, Tuscany, central-northern Italy, located between Florence (distance 30 km), Pisa (45 km) and Siena (55 km). The population numbers approximately 20,000 inhabitants. It is part of Valdelsa. Castelfiorentino borders the following municipalities: Certaldo, Empoli, Gambassi Terme, Montaione, Montespertoli and San Miniato.

== History ==
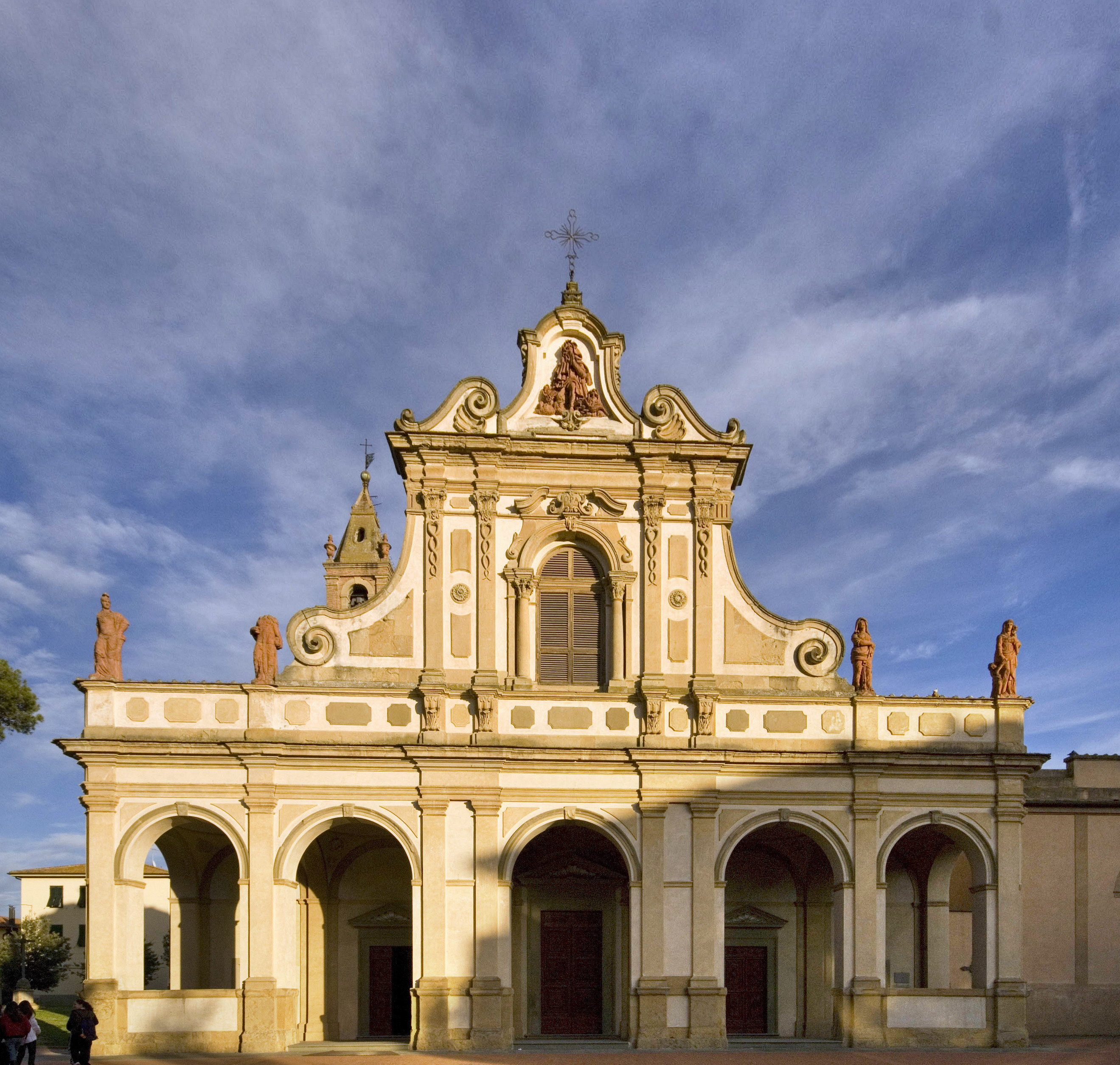
Sanctuary of Santa Verdiana is a Catholic place of worship.

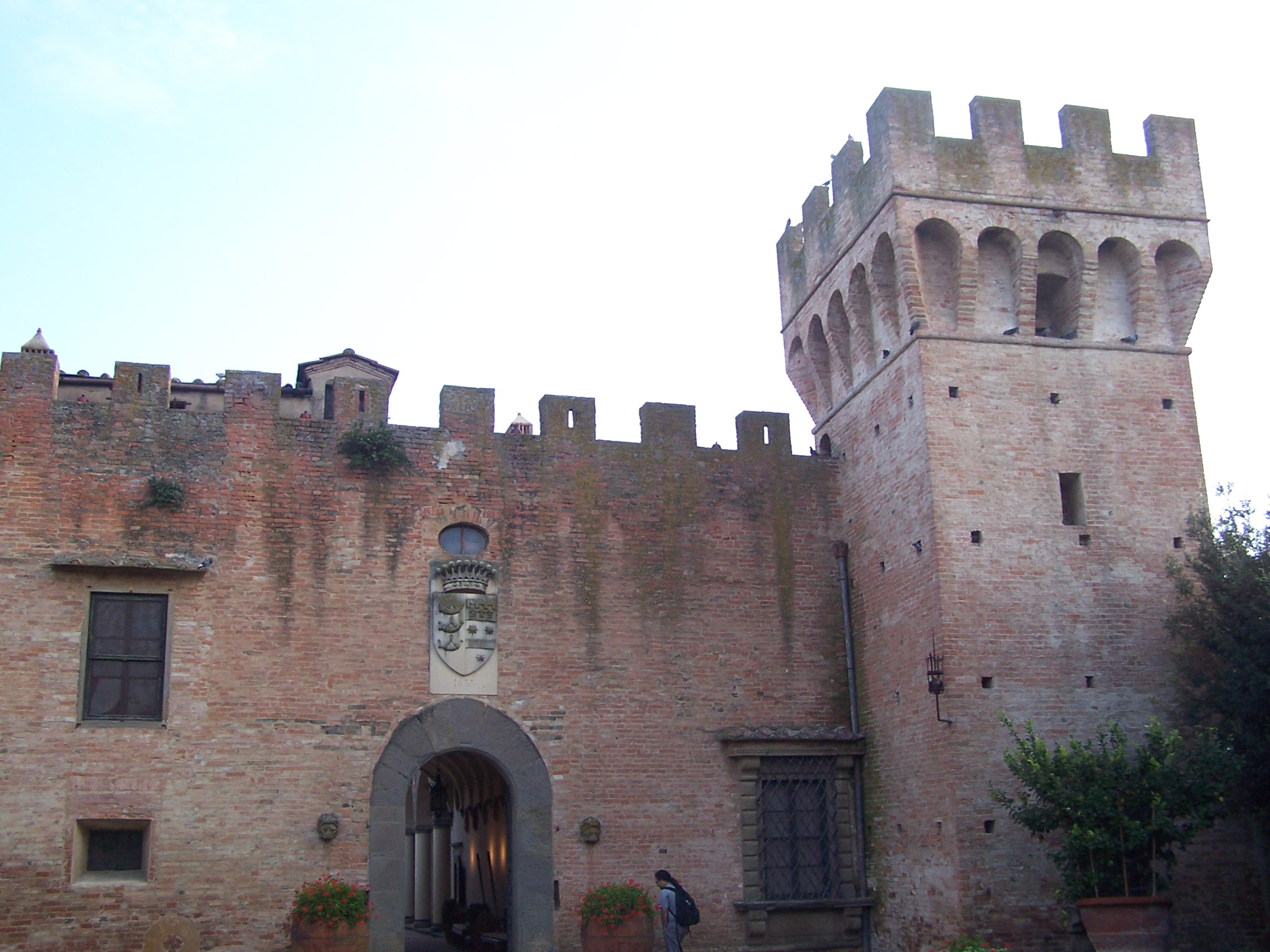
The facade of the Castello di Oliveto.

In 1149, the name of Castelfiorentino was given to the Castelvecchio built on the via Francigena, an ancient settlement of Roman origin: Timignano. The fortified castle enclosed, on the hill, the parish church of S. Ippolito (the ancient S. Biagio) and with a second circle of walls, Borgo d'Elsa and Borgo Nuovo. There were five gates (Porta Fiorentina, Porta Pisana, Porta al Vento, Porta Senese, and Porta di Borgo). Only two roads crossed on the only square (today Piazza del Popolo). Fief of the Cadolingi and then Conti Alberti gradually acquired by the Bishop of Florence in the 12th century. It underwent conflicts between the Church and Empire, Guelphs and Ghibellines and between Siena and Florence itself (of which it was an important outpost, and therefore obtained the seat of the podestà, the privilege of the red lily on the white banner and the official integration of the name Castelfiorentino).

In 1260, after the battle of Montaperti, peace was signed between the two rival cities. But it was still the scene of battles and military raids, until, in 1521, it suffered a harsh siege and was devastated by the imperial troops. It was then reconquered by Francesco Ferrucci. With the plague and the death of Ferrucci, Florence had to surrender to the troops of Carlo V and accept the return of the Medici and with it also Castelfiorentino. The Valdelsa remained in a state of desolation due to the war events, so much so that the government of Florence relieved those populations of all expenses. To save money, the two areas of Castelfiorentino and Barbialla (today part of Montaione) were also merged.

The city lost its strategic importance due to the dependence on the vicariate of Certaldo. But in the 18th century, with the Grand Duchy of Lorraine, it progressed again and was Chancellery and Podesteria, with civil guard and extensive jurisdiction also over Certaldo and Montaione.

In 1868, it accepted the annexation to the Kingdom of Italy and became a district capital. In 1902, it was one of the first Italian municipalities to give itself an administration led by the Italian Socialist Party. From the post-war period to today it has been governed by mayors belonging to the Italian Communist Party and to the Democratic Party of the Left, Democrats of the Left, and Democratic Party (Italy).

== Main sights ==
- Collegia church of Sts. Lawrence and Leonard (13th–14th centuries). It houses a crucifix by Giovanni Pisano (14th century)
- Romanesque-Gothic church of St. Francis (13th century), with a Madonna with Child by Taddeo Gaddi, and other works by Cenni di Francesco, Giovanni del Biondo and other 15th century Florentine schools paintings.
- Pieve (pleban church) of Santi Ippolito e Biagio, with a 14th-century crucifix and two 15th-century frescoes
- Oratory of Santi Lorenzo e Barbara.
- Sanctuary of Santa Verdiana (18th century), Catholic place of worship
- Romanesque pieve of Santi Pietro e Paolo, at Coiano (11th century)
- Castello di Oliveto, an ancient castle built in the 15th century by the Pucci family

== Twin towns ==
- Guebwiller, France
