= Nastagio degli Onesti =

Character from Boccaccio's Decameron (V, 8)

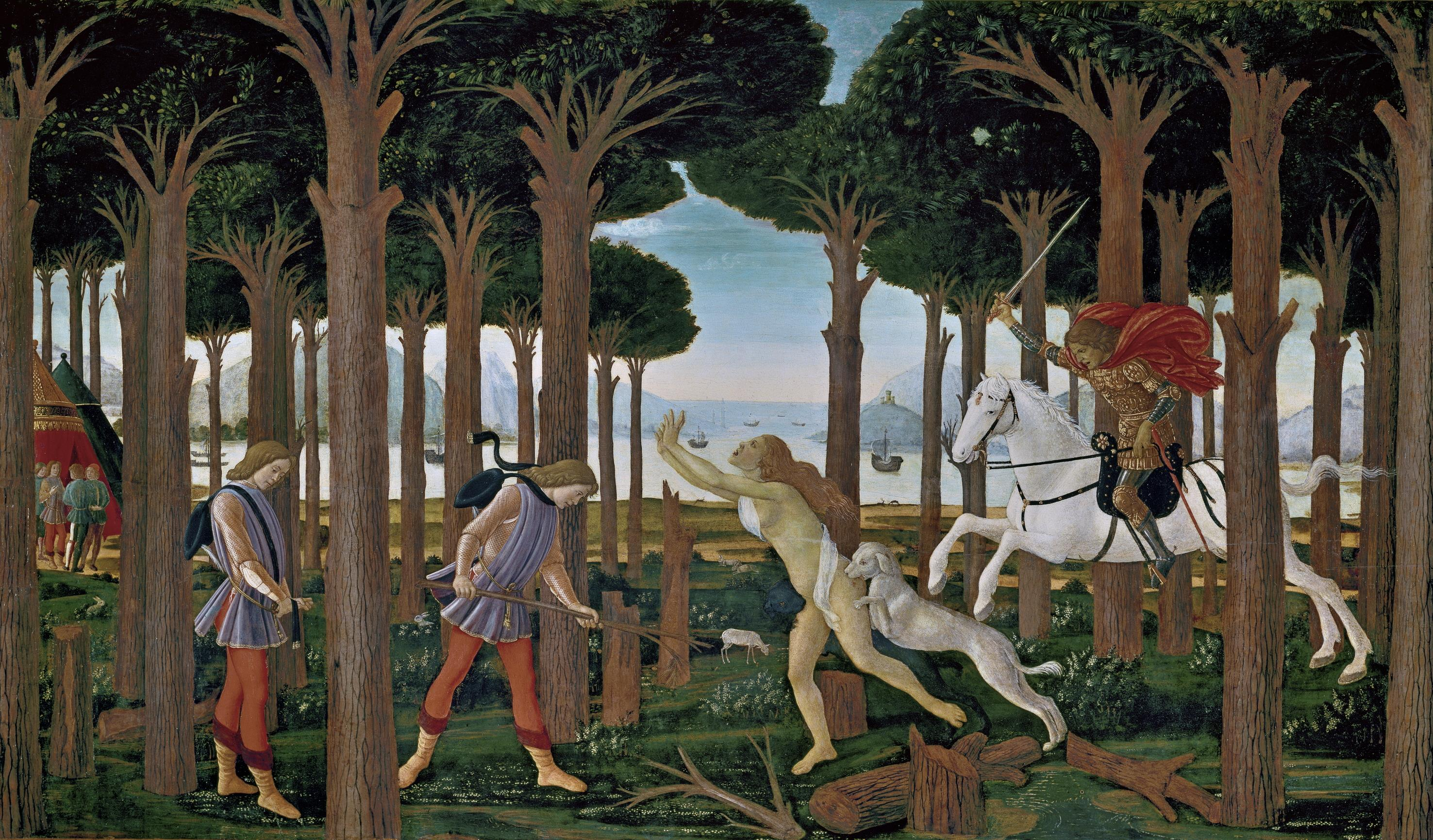
Botticelli, Nastagio meets the woman and the knight in the pine forest of Ravenna, Prado, Madrid

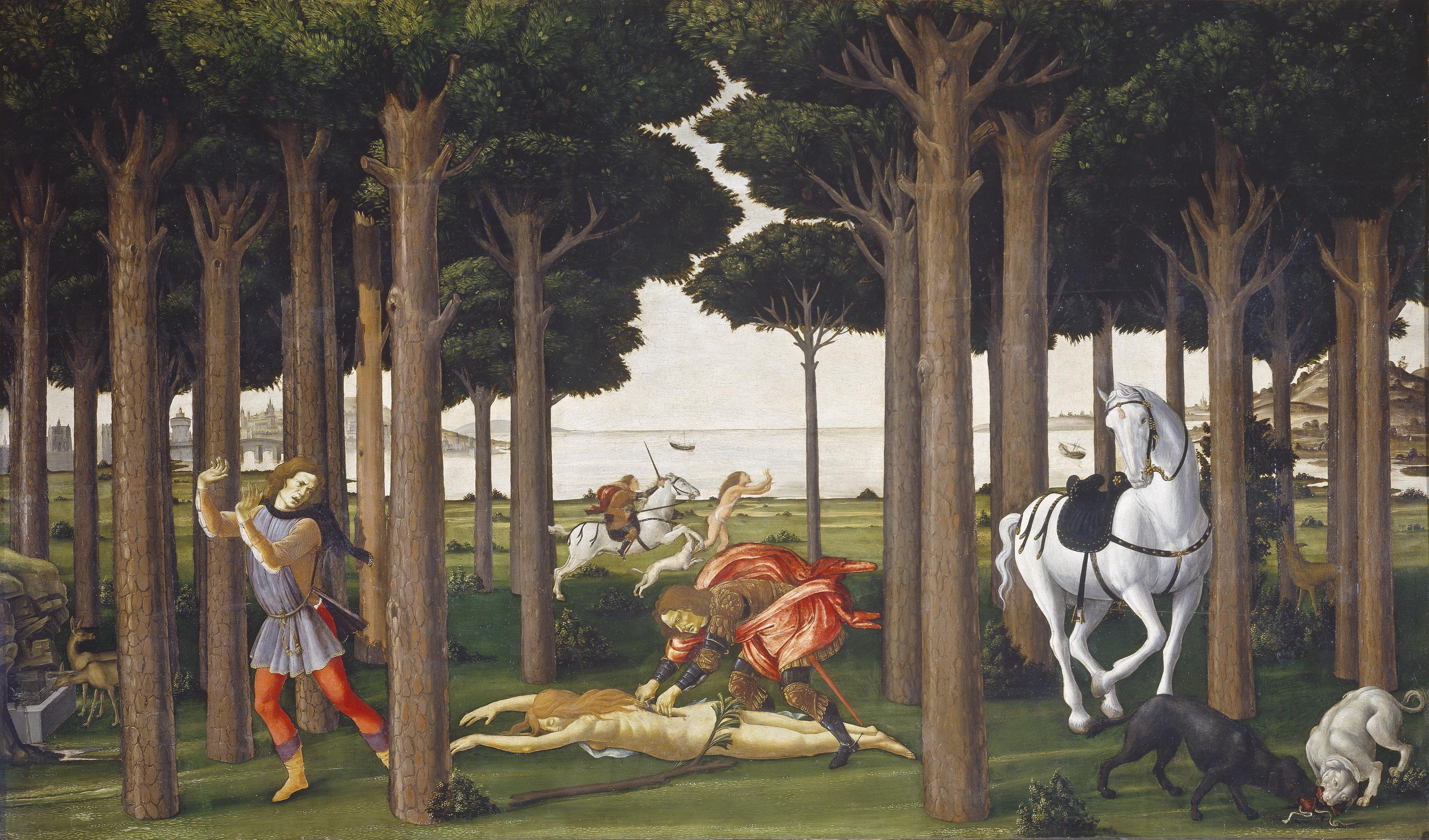
Botticelli, Killing the woman, Prado, Madrid

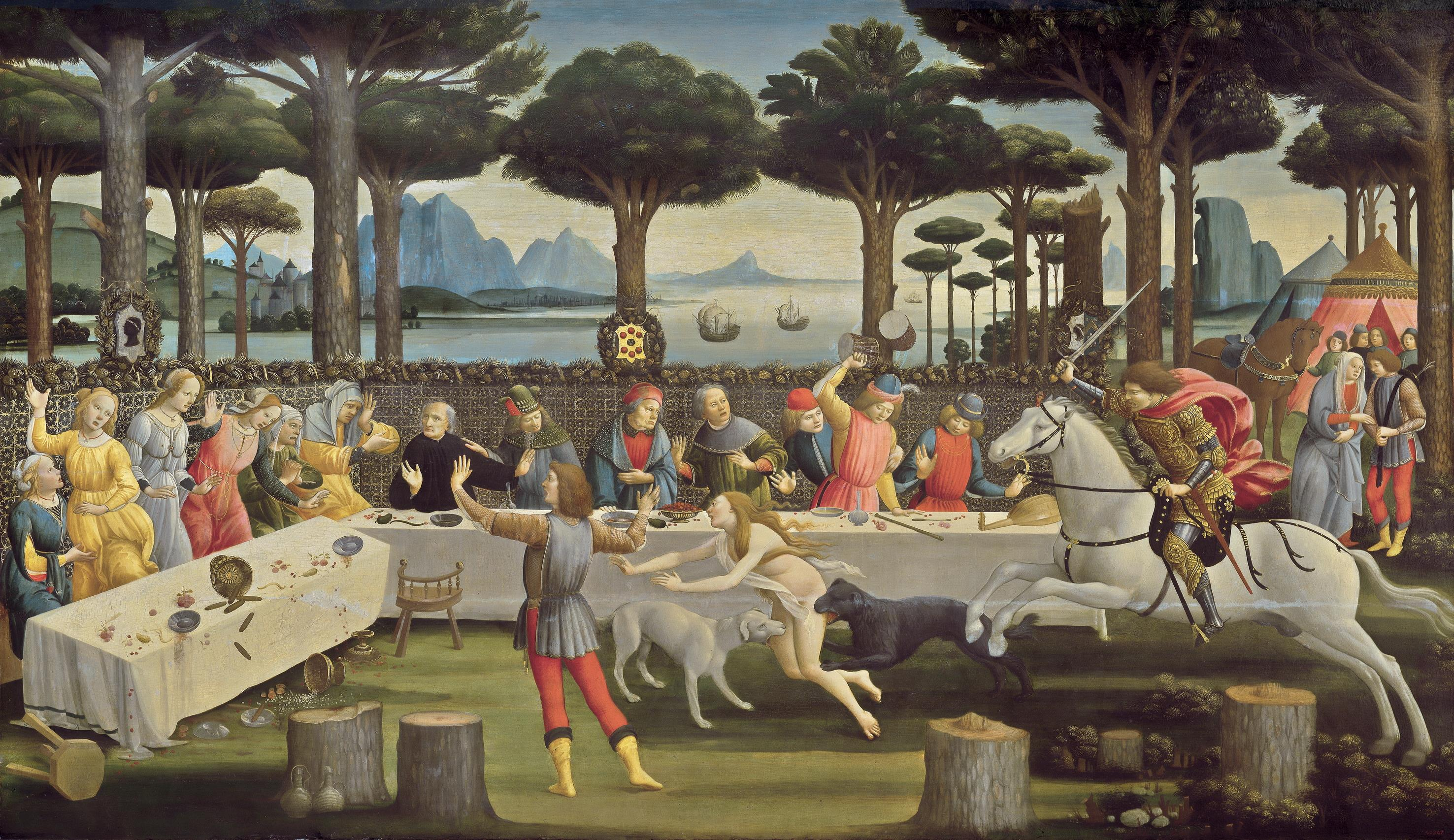
Botticelli, The banquet in the forest, Prado, Madrid

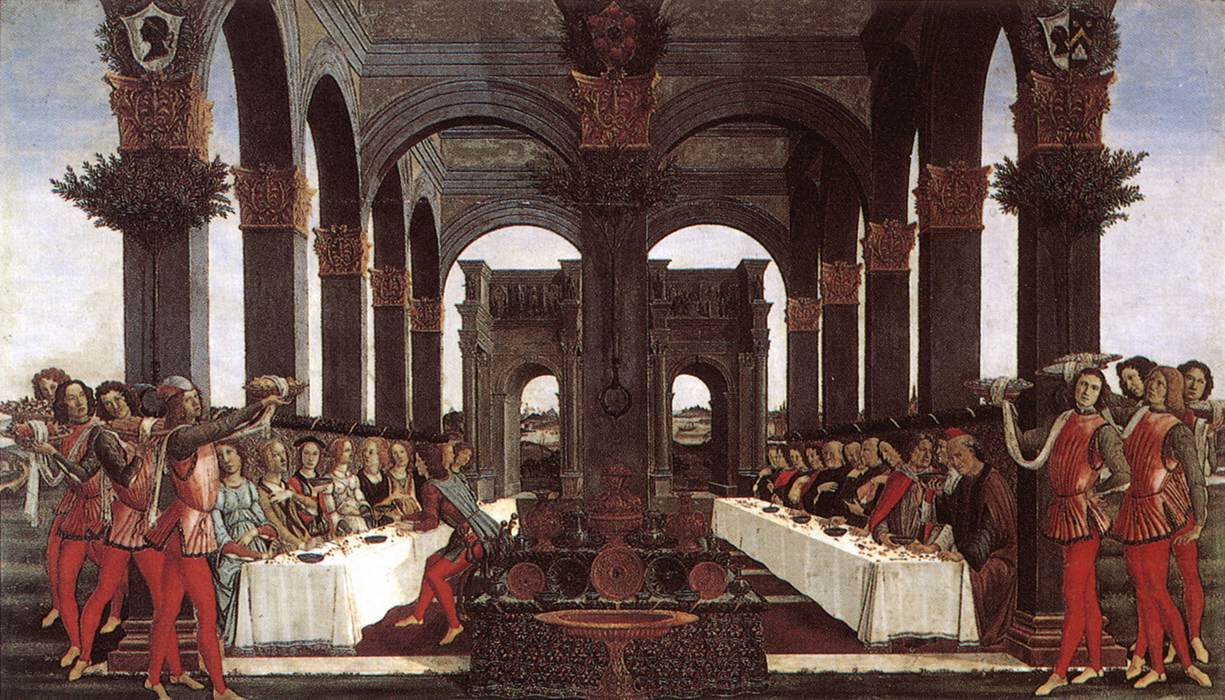
Botticelli, Marriage of Nastagio degli Onesti, Florence, Palazzo Pucci

Nastagio degli Onesti is the protagonist in one of the one hundred short stories contained in The Decameron by Giovanni Boccaccio, La historia de Nastagio degli Onesti. The eighth story of the fifth day, it tells of the unrequited love of the nobleman Nastagio for a girl who will eventually be induced to accept Nastagio's affection by the appearance of a rejected lover and her beloved. The story was rendered as four paintings by Sandro Botticelli around 1483.

== Plot summary ==
Nastagio degli Onesti is a noble in Ravenna, made rich after the death of his father and uncle. He falls in love with a girl of a noble family, the daughter of Paul Traversari. To get her attention, Nastagio begins to squander his money on banquets and parties organized only for her (a reference to the economy that links this story to that of Frederick of Alberighi). The girl, however, does not return the love of Nastagio; indeed she takes pleasure in refusing it. Nastagio tries to forget the noble girl. Failing this he starts to hate her. This drives him to attempt suicide several times with no success.

Seeing Nastagio's despair, his friends and relatives advise him to leave Ravenna, in order to forget his unfulfilled love. The young man, unable to continue ignoring this advice, moves to Classe, not far from his hometown.

One Friday in early May, Nastagio walks through a pine forest, where he sees a girl running naked, shrieking and weeping, being chased by two dogs trying to bite her and a knight riding a black steed and holding a sword, threatening to kill her. Nastagio tries to defend her, but the knight presents himself as Guido of Anastagi and tells of how he had once loved this woman, but because she did not love him and was cruel to him, he had killed himself. When the girl died without any regrets for the misery she had inflicted on her admirer, she was sentenced to the cruel punishment of being hunted. Every Friday, the girl would have to undergo the killing and subsequent restoration of her body for as many years as it had been months that she had rejected her suiter.

Nastagio witnesses the agony inflicted on the young girl by the rider, after which the two are forced to start the chase again and disappear from Nastagio's sight. The young man decides to take advantage of the situation and prepares a lavish banquet in the same place of the forest on the following Friday, inviting his beloved and her parents. As Nastagio anticipated, at the end of the dinner the horrifying scene is repeated with the same harrowing and pitiful consequences. With this he gets the desired effect: after the knight once again explains the reasons for the girl's fate to all of those present at the dinner, the girl Nastagio loves recalls the cruelty she had inflicted upon him and, for fear of suffering the same fate as the victim she witnessed, she changes her mind and agrees to marry Nastagio. On the following Sunday they marry, and all the women of Ravenna "became a good deal more amenable to men's pleasure than they had ever been in the past".

== Depiction by Botticelli ==
Sandro Botticelli made a series of four panels that illustrate episodes of the story by Boccaccio. They were commissioned in 1483 by the Pucci family in celebration of a wedding. Originally stored in Palazzo Pucci, Florence, in the second half of the nineteenth century they were dispersed: three are now in the Prado, and only one, the last, has returned to its original location after being, among other things, in the Collection Watney of Charlbury at London.

== Style and interpretations ==
Two characters of the novel, the knight and fleeing woman, are damned in hell. They have not repented for their sins, which was suicide for him and cruelty for her. For Boccaccio, everyone has the right to love and be loved in return, so the woman was guilty for not having loved.

The scene of the "infernal hunt" was included in Canto XIII of the Inferno of Dante's Divine Comedy — the Canto of Pietro della Vigna — but Boccaccio presents it in a different setting.
