= Castello di Oliveto =

Castles of Tuscany

Castle of Oliveto
- Castello di Oliveto
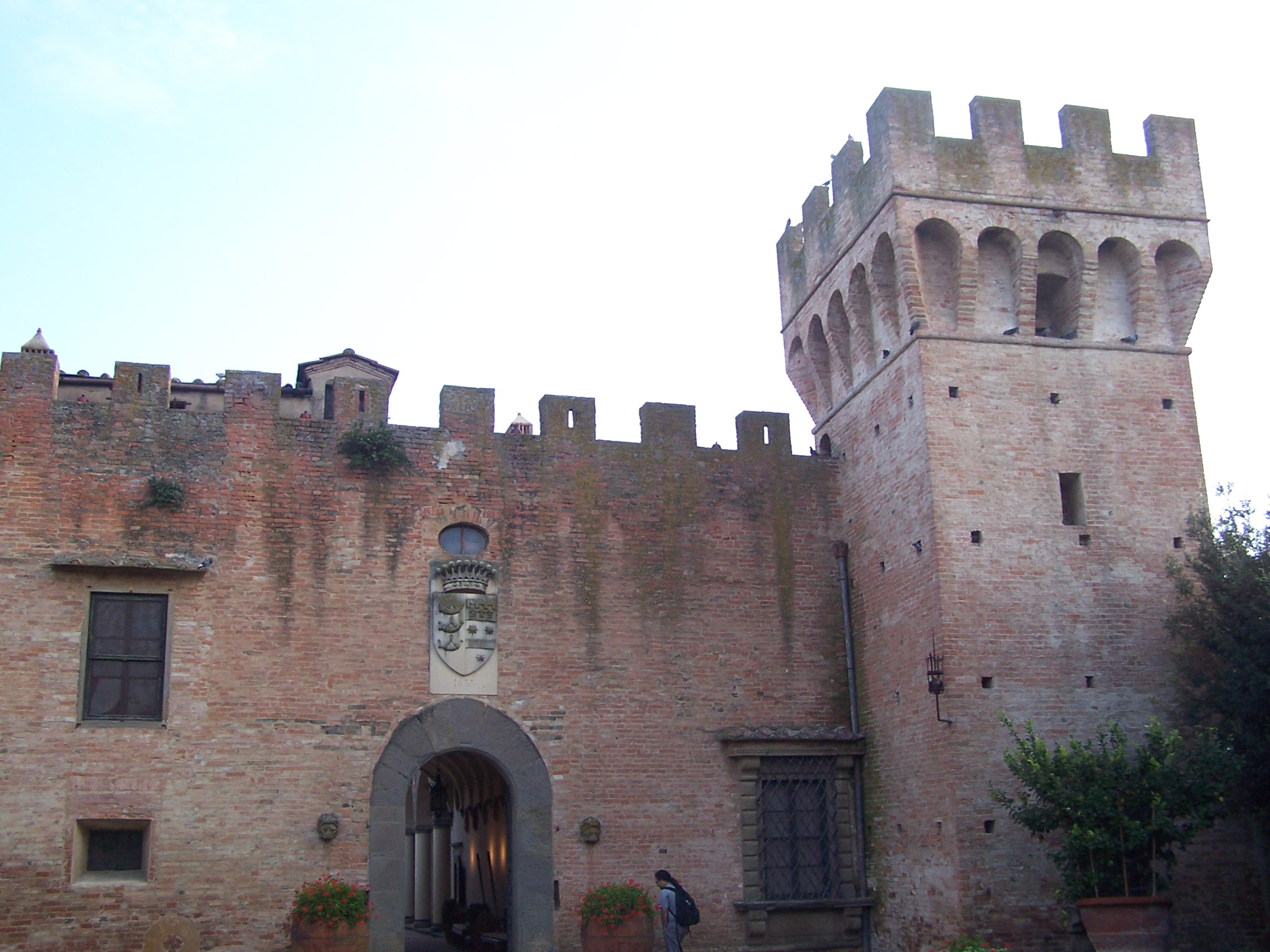
- The facade of the castle of Oliveto.

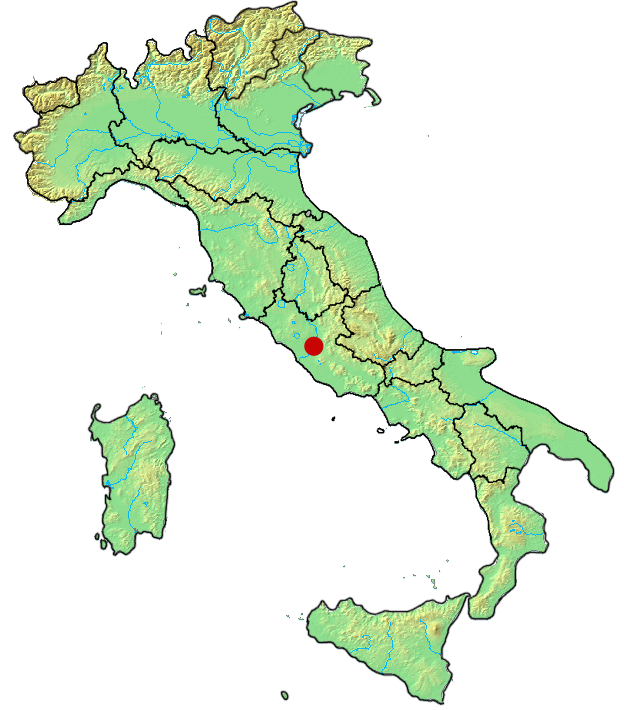
- Map of Italy

General information
- Location: Castelfiorentino, Italy
- Coordinates: 43°35′43″N 11°1′12″E
- Completed: 15th century

Castello di Oliveto ("Castle of Oliveto" in English) is an ancient castle built in the 15th century by the Pucci family. The castle is in Castelfiorentino in the province of Florence.

== Description ==
The castle of Oliveto was built in 1424 on the hills overlooking the valley and Elsa river, adjacent to the road that connects Castelfiorentino to Certaldo. It is a rectangular red brick construction with high walls and four corner towers crowned with battlements. It was built by Puccio Pucci, of the Florentine Pucci family as a country house. It is protected by moats, walls, and towers. The name derives from the olive groves that surround the hills.

The castle has a marble coat of arms at the entrance and a main door that leads into an internal courtyard with a loggia with four arches and a chapel for religious functions. The castle is well preserved with fifteenth-century furniture, trophy weapons, and a collection of portraits executed from the sixteenth to the eighteenth century. There is a rainwater collection, which was originally a refuge and an underground exit from the castle.

The history of the castle includes battles between Siena and Florence, and famous guests like Pope Leo X, Pope Clement VII, and Pope Paul III; the Grand Duke of Tuscany, Ferdinand III, and the King of Italy Victor Emmanuel III of Italy. Around 1850, the property passed from the Pucci family to the Guicciardini family, an Italian noble family, which originated from Florence.

Today, the castle is a modern farm with the production of wines and oil. It is rented out as a venue for wedding receptions, Tuscan dinners, and wine tasting.

== In popular culture ==
In the third season of Medici (TV Series), Girolamo Riario's men seize Ferrara, 100 miles from Florence and takes their salt. The attack by Riario's men on Ferrara was filmed at Castle of Oliveto in Castelfiorentino.
