= Francesco Pucci =

Italian philosopher

Francesco Pucci (1543 – 5 July 1597) was an Italian philosopher and humanist.

== Life ==
Pucci was born in Figline Valdarno. He was of the same family as the Cardinals Lorenzo Pucci, Roberto Pucci, and Antonio Pucci. He worked began in a mercantile house at Lyon and came into contact with the Protestant Reformation. He made his way to London, where he became acquainted with Antonio de Corro.

In 1572 he went to Oxford, apparently expecting to find sympathy with his antagonism to the Calvinistic tendency in Protestantism. On 18 May 1574 he was admitted M.A. He applied for a post of lecturer in theology, but his disputations soon annoyed the authorities, who expelled him (before June 1575) from the university. John Rainolds noted his departure with approval. In 1575–7 he was in London, communicating with the Italian congregation of the strangers' church, but unsettled in his views.

He corresponded with Francesco Betti, a Roman of noble family, who advised him to come to Basel and lay his difficulties before Fausto Paulo Sozzini (Socinus). Pucci reached Basel about May 1577, and held a written disputation with Sozzini on the question of immortality. Pucci regarded all creatures as imperishable; Sozzini denied the natural immortality of man, treating a future life as a conditional privilege. On 4 June Pucci formulated his positions, under ten heads; Sozzini replied on 11 June; Pucci finished a rejoinder on 1 July. The discussion was interrupted by the expulsion of Pucci from Basel. He had publicly maintained an extreme form of Pelagianism, printing theses, ‘De Fide natura hominibus universis insita,’ in which he claimed that all men are by nature in a state of salvation. Soon afterwards an epidemic drove Sozzini from Basel; he completed an answer to Pucci at Zürich on 27 January 1578. This, in the following October, he forwarded to Pucci, who made notes on the margin of the manuscript, but wrote no formal reply.

From Basel Pucci had returned by way of Nuremberg and Flanders to London, where Sozzini believed him to be still staying in December 1580. His views exposed him to persecution and imprisonment; on his release he went to Holland, where he met Justus Lipsius at Leyden. In Holland he attached himself to a 'concilium peregrinantium Christianorum,' and invited the adhesion of Sozzini. He soon moved on to Antwerp.

By 1585 he had joined Sozzini in Poland. At Kraków he fell in with John Dee and Edward Kelley, who initiated Pucci into their angelic experiences; and about the middle of 1585, despite objections from Sozzini, he accompanied them to Prague. On his arrival there, an angelic voice bade him re-enter the Roman communion, which he at once did. He wrote to Sozzini and other friends, entreating them to follow his example. Dee and Kelley suspected him of bad faith in treating against them with Roman Catholic ecclesiastics; he exculpated himself in a letter of 17 September 1585, which was printed.

Reverting to the theme which had caused his expulsion from Basel, he printed a treatise 'De Christi Servatoris Efficacitate in omnibus et singulis hominibus .... Assertio Catholica,' &c., Gouda, 1592, with a dedication to Pope Clement VIII. A 'Refutatio' of this 'Satanic' treatise was published by Lucas Osiander at Tübingen in 1593; Nicholas Serarius also published 'Contra Novos … Puccii … Errores libri duo,' &c., Würzburg, 1593, and there were other replies. He projected a journey to Rome, to present his book in person; but in November 1592, while on the way, he was thrown from a moving vehicle. He was for some months with a broken thigh at Salzburg, where he probably died, under arrest, in 1593.

== Notes ==
Attribution

This article incorporates text from a publication now in the public domain: "Pucci, Francesco". Dictionary of National Biography. London: Smith, Elder & Co. 1885–1900.
