= San Michele Visdomini =

Church building in Florence, Italy

Coordinates: 43°46′26.14″N 11°15′29.05″E

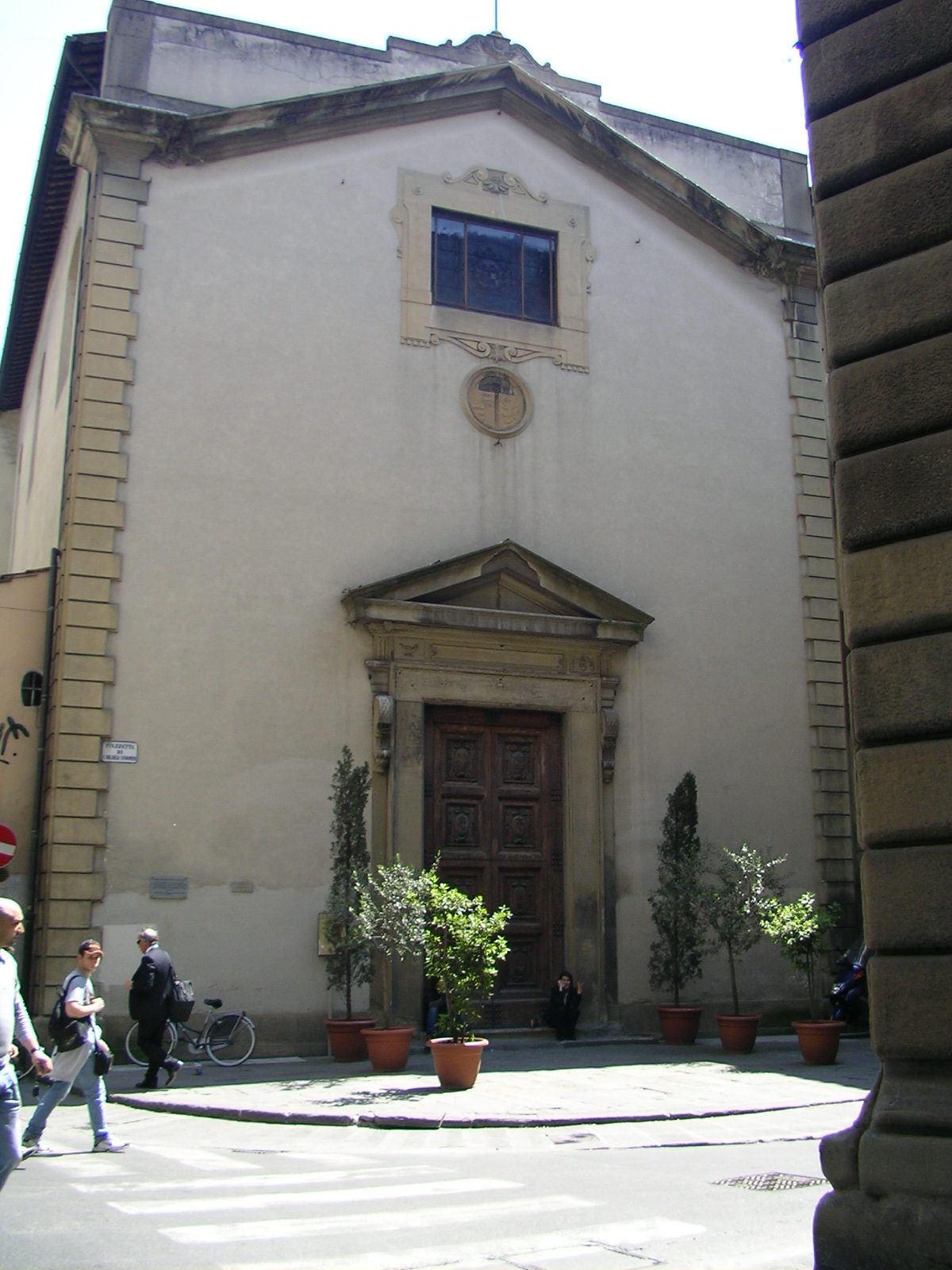
San Michele Visdomini.

San Michele Visdomini is a Roman Catholic church in the centre of Florence, central Italy. The original church of San Michele was demolished in 1368 to make space for the tribunes of the new Cathedral of Florence. Soon it was rebuilt in its present location to a design by Giovanni di Lapo Ghini, with later facade (1577-1590) by Bartolomeo Ammannati. A chapel for Francesco Pucci houses a Holy Family and Saints by Jacopo Pontormo.

The name Visdomini derives from the simplification of a title of an administrator in an episcopal office (a "vice domino").
