= Ambrose Traversari =

Italian monk and theologian (1386–1439)

Saint Ambrose Traversari O.S.B. Cam.
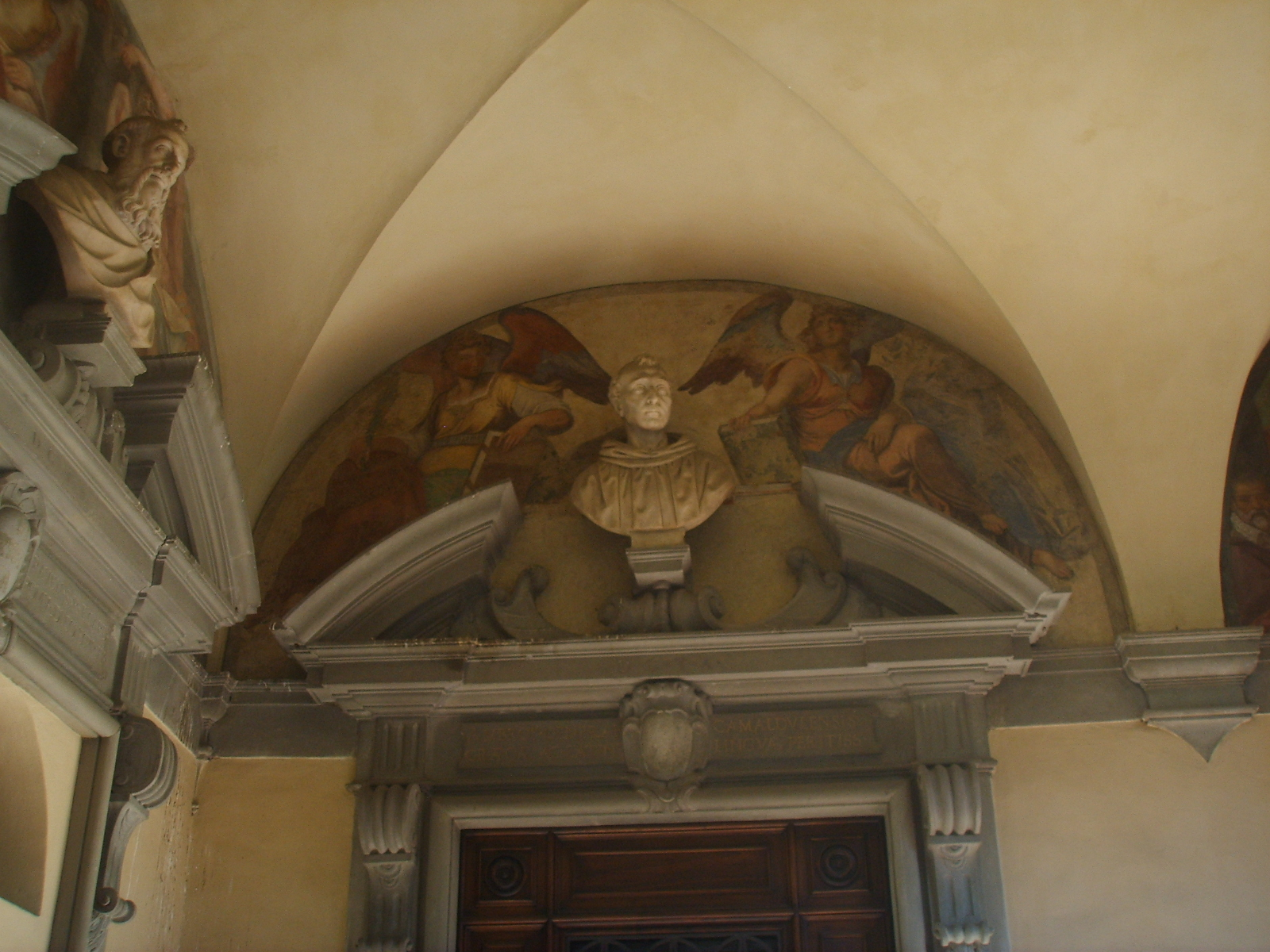
- Bust of Traversari in the sacristy cloister of the Church of St. Mary of the Angels, Florence, Italy

Scholar, theologian and saint Prior General of the Camaldolese Order
- Born: 1386; Portico di Romagna, Forlì, Papal States
- Died: 20 October 1439; Florence, Republic of Florence
- Venerated in: Catholic Church (Camaldolese Order)
- Feast: 20 November

Ambrogio Traversari, also referred to as Ambrose of Camaldoli (1386 – 20 October 1439), was an Italian monk and theologian who was a prime supporter of the papal cause in the 15th century. He is honored as a saint by the Camaldolese Order.

== Biography ==
Traversari was born near Forlì, in the village of Portico di Romagna in 1386. At the age of 14, he entered the Camaldolese Order in the Monastery of St. Mary of the Angels in Florence, and soon acquired a reputation as a leading theologian and Hellenist. In his study of Greek literature, his master was Emmanuel Chrysoloras. Traversari worked primarily as a scholar until he became prior general of the Order in 1431.

Traversari emerged as a leading advocate of papal primacy. This attitude he showed clearly when he attended the Council of Basel as legate of Pope Eugene IV and defended the primacy of the pope, calling upon the council not to "rend asunder Christ's seamless robe". He was next sent by Eugene to the Emperor Sigismund to ask his aid in the pope's efforts to end this council, which for five years had been encroaching on papal prerogatives. Eugene transferred the council from Basel to Ferrara on 18 September 1437.

So strong was Traversari's hostility to some of the delegates that he described Basel as a western Babylon. He likewise supported the pope at Ferrara and Florence and worked hard to reconcile the Eastern and Western Churches. But in this council, and later, in that of Florence, Traversari, by his efforts and charity toward some indigent Greek bishops, greatly helped to bring about a union of the two Churches, the decree for which, 6 July 1439, he was called on to prepare a draft.

Ambrose Traversari died soon after. His feastday is celebrated by the Camaldolese Order on 20 November.

== Character ==
According to the author of his biography in the eleventh edition of the Encyclopædia Britannica: "Ambrose is interesting as typical of the new humanism which was growing up within the church. Thus, while among his own colleagues he seemed merely a hypocritical and arrogant priest, in his relations with his brother humanists, such as Cosimo de' Medici, he appeared as the student of classical antiquities and especially of Greek theological authors".

== Works ==
His works include a treatise on the Holy Eucharist, one on the Procession of the Holy Spirit, many lives of saints, and a history of his term as prior general of the Camaldolese. He also translated from Greek into Latin a life of John Chrysostom (Venice, 1533); the Spiritual Wisdom of John Moschus; The Ladder of Divine Ascent of John Climacus (Venice, 1531), P.G., LXXXVIII. Between 1424 and 1433, he worked on the translation of the Lives and Opinions of Eminent Philosophers by Diogenes Laërtius, which came to be widely circulated in manuscript form. He also translated four books against the errors of the Greeks, by Manuel Kalekas, Patriarch of Constantinople, a Dominican friar (Ingolstadt, 1608), P.G., CLII, col. 13-661, a work known only through Ambrose's translation.

He also translated many homilies of John Chrysostom; the writings of Dionysius Areopagita (1436); Basil of Caesarea's treatise on virginity; thirty-nine discourses of Ephrem the Syrian, and many other works of the Fathers and writers of the Greek Church. Jean Mabillon's Letters and Orations of St. Ambrose of Camaldoli was published in Florence in 1759.

Selected works:

- Hodoeporicon, diary of a journey visiting the monasteries of Italy
- Epistolarium, correspondence
- translations of
  - Palladius, Life of Chrysostom
  - Ephraem Syrus, Nineteen Sermons of Ephraem Syrus
  - Basil of Caesarea, On Virginity
  - Diogenes Laërtius, Vitae philosophorum (Lives and Opinions of Eminent Philosophers)
  - Pseudo-Dionysius the Areopagite (1436)

A number of his manuscripts remain in the library of Saint Mark in Venice.

== See also ==
- Traversari
- The Baptism of Christ (Piero della Francesca)
