= Albert John Pucci =

American artist (1920–2005)

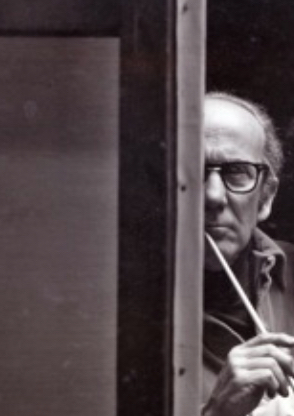
- Born: March 11, 1920; Cleveland, Ohio, U.S.
- Died: May 30, 2005 (aged 85)
- Education: Pratt Institute
- Known for: Painting, Illustration, Book Cover Art, Textile Design

Albert John Pucci (March 11, 1920 – May 30, 2005) was an American multi-genre visual artist. His works have been honored with awards from the National Academy of Design and National Audubon Society and have been featured in exhibitions and galleries, including the National Academy and the Brooklyn Museum as well as private and corporate collections throughout the world. Primarily known as a painter and illustrator, his prolific output contains works of realism, illustration, book cover art, textile design and romantic cubism.

== Style ==
Pucci's prolific work includes Neo Realism, Renaissance and Cubism styles, using various mediums including oil, charcoal, watercolor, textiles and tempera. His landscapes, streetscapes, still life's and portraiture's encompass themes from light-hearted and joyous to moody and melancholy, frequently depicting locales such as Italy, New York City and coastal Maine.

== Education ==
Pucci studied at the Brooklyn Academy of Fine Arts and then attended the Pratt Institute, where he worked as an instructor in figure drawing, and layout and design for 24 years. While there, he formed a lasting friendship with renowned artist Frank Frazetta, who said of Pucci, "I think I learned more from my friends there, especially Albert Pucci."

== Commercial art ==
Pucci excelled in the field of commercial art, creating numerous book covers for major publishers such as Signet, Dell, Houghton Mifflin, Washington Square Press and Mentor Books which were featured on works of classic authors such as Shakespeare, Bronte, Melville, Tennyson and Twain. He also was regularly commissioned for children's book illustrations, magazine illustrations and received accolades for his 48-year career with American Artists Group, who published his paintings as popular greeting cards each year.

== Exhibitions and collections ==
In 1954, Pucci's first one-artist Exhibition was held at the Associated American Artists Galleries in Manhattan, New York. He would go on to exhibit at numerous galleries, shows and exhibitions throughout New York, Washington, Connecticut and Maine. Notable exhibitions of Pucci's work included the National Academy and The Brooklyn Museum. His work has been featured in various permanent collections, including the Thayer Museum of Art in Lawrence, Kansas and the Wausau Museum in Wausau, Wisconsin as well as corporate collections of companies such as MetLife, Nabisco, Pfizer, Lehman Brothers, Abbot Laboratories, Sears Roebuck and Montgomery Ward.

His works are regarded as highly collectible and have been offered in various online art auctions.

== Personal life ==
Pucci was born in Cleveland, Ohio on March 11, 1920. His family relocated to Brooklyn, New York where we would reside in Brooklyn Heights for the next 80 years. He was married to his wife Gora for over 50 years, with whom he had three children and six grandchildren. He is the father of Lisa De Wolf, show designer of the world-renowned performance art group Artrageous. He died on May 30, 2005.
