= Pucci Altarpiece =

Painting by Pontormo

Madonna and Child with Saints
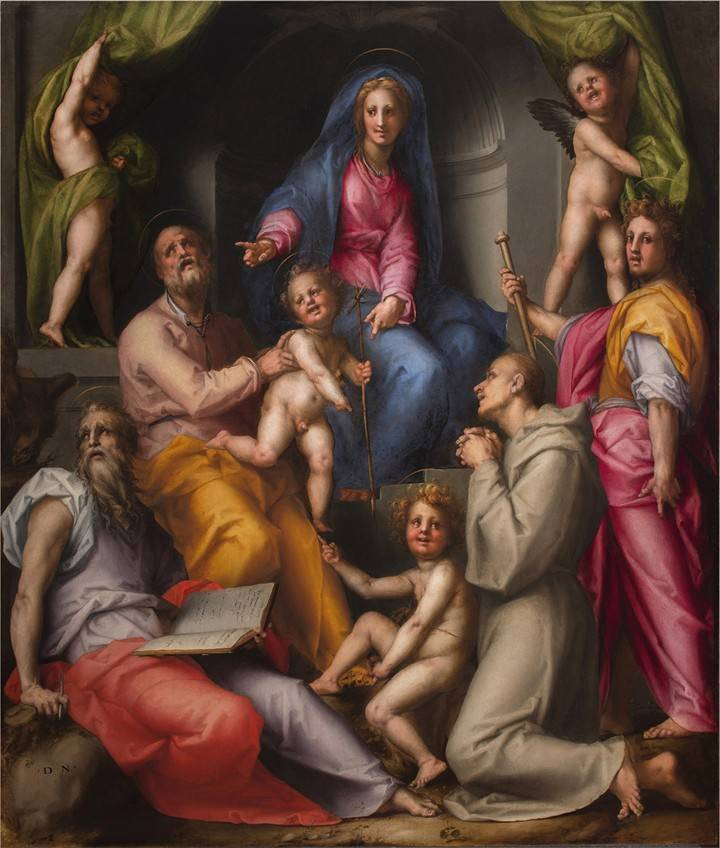
- Artist: Pontormo
- Year: 1518
- Type: Oil on paper
- Dimensions: 214 cm × 195 cm (84 in × 77 in)
- Location: San Michele Visdomini, Florence

The Madonna and Child with Saints, also known as the Pucci Altarpiece (Italian: Pala Pucci), is a painting by the Italian late Renaissance painter Jacopo Pontormo, executed in 1516. It is housed in the church of San Michele Visdomini in Florence.

It portrays numerous figures. Saint Joseph, on the left, is holding the Christ Child (a role usually fulfilled by the Madonna). The presence of Saint Joseph is explained by the fact that the Gospel of James deals with Christ's childhood and praises Joseph's paternal cares. Saint Francis is connected to name of the commissioner and the devotion of his order towards Jesus.

== History ==
The work was commissioned by Francesco Pucci, a collaborator of the House of Medici and a justice gonfaloniere. The date can be seen in the painting on the book held by Saint John the Evangelist, on the left. Painted on panel, it is one of the few works by him which is still in its original location.

== Sources ==
- Pontormo e Rosso, la "Maniera moderna" in Toscana. 1994.
