= Pucci of Pitigliano family =

Cadet branch of the House of Pucci

Pucci of Pitigliano
- Noble House
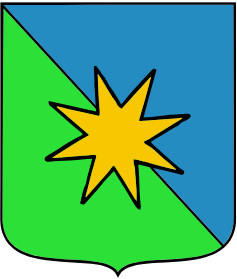
- Arms of the family
- Parent family: House of Pucci; House of Orsini
- Country: Grand Duchy of Tuscany; Kingdom of Italy; Italy
- Founded: 1607
- Founder: Lorenzo Pucci; Ersilia Orsini
- Current head: Unknown
- Titles: Count of Pitigliano
- Motto: Traditio est radix (Latin for 'Tradition is the root')

The Pucci of Pitigliano family (Italian: Pucci di Pitigliano), is a cadet branch of the Florentine House of Pucci, originating in 1607. The head of the house traditionally bears the title of Count of Pitigliano.

== History ==
After Pitigliano and its surrounding territories had long been ruled by the Orsini family, the County of Pitigliano was definitively sold on 9 June 1604 to Ferdinando I de' Medici, Grand Duke of Tuscany. The sale was made by Giannantonio Orsini, son of Count Alessandro, in order to settle significant debts. In exchange, the Orsini received the marquisate of Monte San Savino.

In 1607, Ersilia Orsini, sister of Count Giannantonio, married Lorenzo Pucci, a member of the Florentine noble family Pucci. The marriage had the implicit aim of preserving the cultural legacy and traditions associated with the Orsini lineage, which had governed Pitigliano for nearly two centuries. By marrying into the Pucci family, Ersilia sought to maintain the prestige and continuity of the Orsini heritage while linking it to another influential Tuscan noble house.

From this union emerged the cadet branch known as the Pucci of Pitigliano. Although the title of Count of Pitigliano had ceased to exist as a formal territorial dignity after the Medici acquisition, family tradition maintained that the title would be symbolically borne by the eldest male heir of the line.

== Present day ==
According to the 26th edition (2020) of the Yearbook of the Italian Nobility (Libro d'oro della nobiltà italiana), the Pucci family continues to claim the historical title of Count of Pitigliano. The title, although no longer connected to a territorial jurisdiction, has been transmitted within the family as a traditional and symbolic designation across generations.

The last descendant of the branch for whom references exist was the Count Gerino Pucci born in 1907, though information regarding his later life and lineage remains uncertain.
