= Artrageous =

American touring and virtual performance art community

Artrageous Arts Community
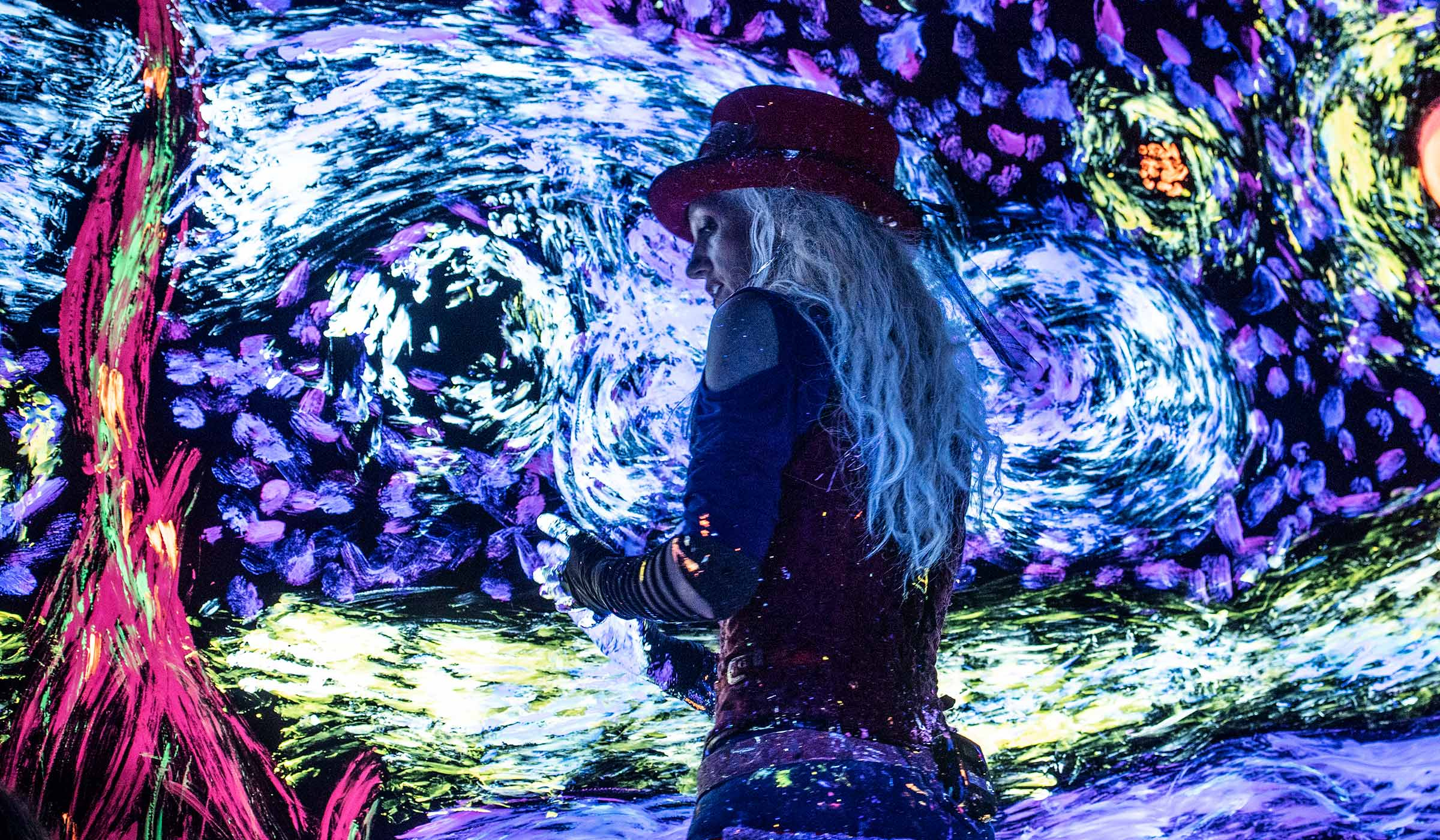
- Formation: 1980; 46 years ago
- Founders: Daniel K. Moyer, Deborah B. Noble
- Type: Theatre group
- Purpose: Touring show, In-house residencies, Artreach Non-profit
- Location: Tijeras, New Mexico, U.S.
- Members: Lisa de Wolf; Donna Yathon; Chris Francis; Gaelan de Wolf; Olivia Kirkley; Sophia Mitchell; Jolene Davis; Jaden Francis; Sarah Lauder; William Basso; Christine Iversen; Jarvis Moorehead
- Artistic director(s): Daniel K. Moyer, Deborah B. Noble
- Notable members: John C. de Wolf, Lauri McKelvey-Francis
- Website: artrageousartscommunity.com

Artrageous Arts Community is an artistic community and an American touring and virtual performance art company. Formed in 2014 from a theater arts community, the group was first established in 1980 in Vancouver, British Columbia, Canada. The community began doing street theater in the 80's before growing into an internationally renowned touring band, The Pink Flamingos, as well as performance painters in 1998 with the act The 3 Painters. In 2014 the troupe combined their diverse artistic backgrounds into one show called Artrageous.

With a history of over 3000 shows performed as an artistic community and averaging over 100 theater performances per year as Artrageous, the troupe has appeared on TV programs, had multiple national and international tours, and has been featured as primary performers and educators for educational institutions and corporations throughout North America and abroad.

== The Live Experience ==
Artrageous is known for its blend of multiple art forms into a single, interactive live concert experience for all ages. They are based out of their community studio center and production offices located between Santa Fe and Albuquerque, New Mexico, USA.

“Artrageous is really all about the arts, We try to throw as many different arts as possible on one stage. So if you come to an Artrageous show, you're going to see live painting, music, singing, dancing, comedy and audience interaction, and the artists are always collaborating with the musicians, to try to complete their portraits in the amount of time it takes to do the songs. It's always just like a rush to the finish - every note is being taken up with creating a masterpiece.” Lauri Francis

Artrageous performances are high-energy and crafted to feature immersive theater encouraging audience participation and typically highlighting several genres of music, dance, puppetry, storytelling, and speed-painted visual art. Artrageous performances feature 10-12 multi-talented performers in a 90-minute, high-energy, participatory concert, and fine art event.

The various concert elements are highlighted by speed-painted re-creations of iconic works of art (DaVinci’s ‘Mona Lisa’, Van Gogh’s ‘Starry Night’), colorful portraits of iconic pop culture figures (Freddie Mercury, Prince, Aretha Franklin, Frank Sinatra, Jimi Hendrix, John Lennon, Vincent Van Gogh, Frida Kahlo, Marilyn Monroe, John F. Kennedy, Martin Luther King, Jr., Ray Charles and more) and American patriotic-themed folk art (American Eagle, Statue of Liberty).

Artrageous paintings, created live-in-concert, are often auctioned for charity and are on display throughout the United States and internationally in public and private galleries and collections. Each Artrageous show typically concludes with an impromptu on-stage gallery event, where audience members are invited to view the art created during the show as well as meet and interact with the performers.

== Artistic Community ==
The community Artrageous calls home is a self-sustaining gathering of artisans, entrepreneurs, and people of all ages and backgrounds with a decades-long history of living and working together. The cohesive element of the group, is their goal to unite persons around the world in service to a re-awakening to the importance of art and community — and how these unite people together to enhance quality of life and health.

“Artrageous wants to provide an atmosphere where people can participate and not just observe — so, for us, it's all about interacting with the arts. Our message is that it's important to work with others, as creating art is a whole other level of team work...no two shows are the same, because of the creative aspect of the experience.” John DeWolf, Director

Artrageous emphasizes a communal effort in their approach to performance and show design. Themes such as inclusivity, teamwork, and the belief that the spotlight is meant to be shared are evident in their performances and business ethic. No single performer is featured as a “star”, and audience members are often included on stage as co-performers during several portions of their shows.

== Artist Residencies ==
Artrageous Arts Community also offers residency opportunities on their campus in New Mexico to people from around the world. Over 200 people from 18 countries have participated in their community where they feature “activities and tools for transformation: Meditation, movement, music, art & exploration. They have provided workshops in visual, performing, musical, and literary arts to guests as well as business for artist skills.

Through their touring show Artrageous, they have also done residencies in different communities. These have included Arrow Rock, Missouri at the Lyceum Theatre in 2021, and Huntsville Alabama with Broadway Theatre League 2021, which focused on giving back to healthcare workers after the covid-19 pandemic.

== History & Milestones ==
=== 1980's ===
- Canadian Busking Troupe
- Bunraku Puppet Theater
- All and Everything Theater (1980-1984)
- Comedy, "Dracula" with New Mexico Symphony Orchestra (1982)
- Frankie and the Corvettes (1981-1987)
- The Pink Flamingos (1988–present)

=== 1990's ===
- Flamingo Express (1996-2014)
- Art Explosion (1997–present)

=== 2000's ===
- The 3 Painters (2002–present)

=== 2010's ===
- Artrageous (2014–present)
- Artreach (2014–present)
- Residency Program (2018–present)
- Artreach Summer Camp (2022)

=== 2020's ===
- Artrageous Live Online (2020)
- Artreach Summer Camp (2022)

== Artreach, Education and Charity ==
As an arts community, service to others has always been a strong motivator for the company. They believe the arts are a critical piece to childhood education and can help develop empathy. In 2014, Artreach, a behind-the-scenes version of the Artrageous show was developed specifically for students. Artragous has donated over 100 Artreach shows to communities around the United States. Artrageous performers put on a 45-minute educational presentation followed by a question-and-answer segment between students and performers. The troupe has also created a study guide for students (K-College age) and teachers to engage with the arts outside of the performance.

In March 2020, a live Artrageous Performance helped the Geary Community Hospital raise 1 million dollars.

In 2022, Artreach led its debut children’s art summer camp in Albuquerque, partnering with the African American Performing Arts Center (APAC) in Albuquerque, NM. This was made possible by PNM Electric, The McCune Foundation, APAC, One Albuquerque, and others. This allowed the camp to be free for its participants, who were middle-school aged children with a focus on low-income students. The camp aimed to instill different positive values, such as creativity, teamwork, determination, inclusivity, and strength, and culminated in an interdisciplinary student performance for their families at the end of the 5 days.

"A focus of the community’s endeavors is to create opportunities for people to participate and be included. “It's not often that kids...get to participate or even be on a stage in their whole lives. So we try to create those memorable moments.” Lauri Francis

Artrageous donates the paintings completed during their shows to their theater or company patron as a tool to raise funds and awareness for the arts. Through visual art donations, Artrageous have helped to raise tens of thousands of dollars for charities all over the country and has been auctioned for up to $19,000 each at public and private auctions.

As the COVID-19 pandemic spread throughout North America, Artrageous sought to offset the wider cultural impact, and their own canceled slate of tour dates. In the spring of 2020 they created Artrageous Live, an audience-first outreach, via their online presence on Facebook. Offered at no cost, with the slogan, "Turning Isolation into Inspiration", Artrageous Live is an entertaining and educational set of live and recorded video offerings including performances, games, classes for painting, singing, dancing, juggling and drawing, guest interviews and peeks behind-the-scenes of their production facility outside of Albuquerque, New Mexico. Each class and event is then saved for later views and are available through their Facebook page.

“As responsible parents, teachers and members of planet earth, we all see the effects of technology on our future generations. We understand the need for something more. We understand the critical importance of creatively using your body, mind and emotions.” Lauri Francis

== Community Culture ==
A unique element of Artrageous is that in addition to being performers they also do their own production, show design, videography, logistics, marketing, web development, and promotions all in-house, with the varied skills of their community members. Their troupe members all wear multiple hats within their organization, which they attribute to a high quality of life and personal growth. "We're everything: we're the drivers, we're the crew, we set up, we're the performers, we're the marketing team, we're the sales team. Yup, we're it, " said Lauri Francis.

They have worked with Fortune 500 companies and other corporations since the 90's to design custom events featuring high-energy art performances resulting in a complete experience for the audience; from walking in the theater to after the show with the live, on-stage gallery.

== Commissioned Projects and Installations ==
Artrageous has been involved in several commissioned projects such as the building of a 35’ foot tall Abraham Lincoln in the style of the Lincoln Memorial; the original Musical Comedy ‘Dracula’ performed with the New Mexico Symphony; the full Bunraku Puppetry shows ‘Isis and Osiris’ and ‘Perseus and Medusa’.

They have also worked for corporate clients to bring to life custom art creations. Clients have included the NBA All Stars (2019), Duke University (2016), The Milwaukee Bucks (2015, 2017, 2022), SuperCell (2017), Ford Motors (1998), Marriott Hotels (2019), Bank M (2016) and ABSA Bank with Playback Media (2020), Doterra, VM Ware, Boeing, Gilette and ADP, Behr Paint, General Mills, Kellogg’s, Wells Fargo, IBM, Ink Magazine, Aebal Airlines and Pitney Bowes among others.

== Notable Tours and Appearances ==
International shows have been performed in Paris, Salzburg, Monte Carlo, Brussels, Madrid, Macau, Tokyo, New Delhi, Thailand, Oman, Tanzania, Panama, Dominican Republic, Los Cabos, Cancun, Guanajuato, Bermuda, Bahamas, Virgin Gorda, Toronto and Vancouver among others.

Artrageous shows have been performed in all 50 US States with the exception of Delaware. Notable performances include a private event for Sir Richard Branson on Necker Island, British Virgin Island (2008); a performance at the World Cup Soccer Finals in Paris (1998); headlining at the 44th annual Festival Internacional Cervantino (2016), the NBA All Stars (2019), and the Atlanta ArtsBridge Foundation at the Cobb Energy Performing Arts Center where their show was called “the best field trip experience that we have experienced yet” by staff member Sarah Lynball.
