= Antonio di Puccio Pucci =

Italian architect and politician

Antonio di Puccio Pucci (c. 1350 – after 1416) was an Italian architect and politician from the Pucci family.

== Life ==
A member of the Arte dei Legnaioli (woodworkers' guild), he was one of the planned architects on the Loggia della Signoria (1379) in Florence. In 1381 he was examined and declared fit to take up Republican offices in Florence. He rose through the ranks, from Castellan of Frassino (1385) then of Pistoia (1390), then multiple terms as Priore di Libertà (1396 and 1407) then Gonfaloniere di Compagnia (1400, 1405, 1412, 1416). Finally he became a member of the Magistracy of the "XII Buonuomini" (1404 and 1406) then of the Magistracy of the "VIII di Custodia e Balia" (1412). Though in 1412 he was suspected of involvement with the Alberti counts, declared a rebel and exiled, he was pardoned around 1416, when he took up office as castellan of Torre di Sant’Alberto and Casseretto ad Arezzo.

== Marriage and issue ==
He married twice:

1. in 1384, to Bartolomea del Giocondo, with the following issue
  - Puccio Pucci, founder of the main Pucci noble line.
  - Giovanni, politician
  - Niccolò, Servite friar
2. in 1401, to Lucia Orlandini, with the following issue
  - Benintendi, politician
  - Saracino, founder of the marchionate Pucci line, with the three branches admitted to the Florentine Patriciate in 1752
  - Piero, ally of Cosimo the Elder
  - Ghita
  - Lucrezia
  - Giovanna
