= Palace of the Holy Office =

- Palazzo del Sant'Uffizio
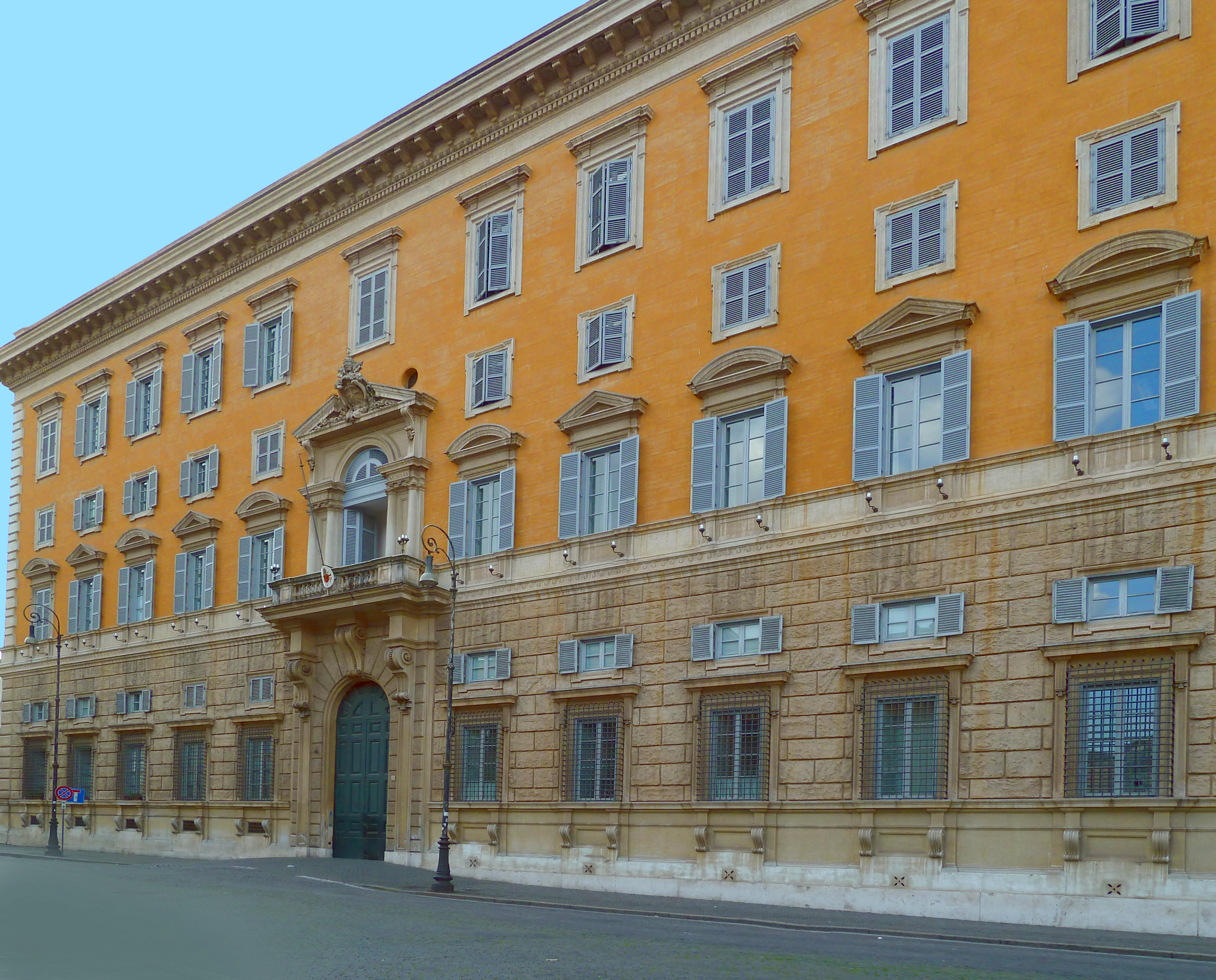
- Façade of the Palace of the Holy Office
- Interactive map of the Palace of the Holy Office area
- Former names: Palazzo Pucci

General information
- Status: Intact
- Type: Palace
- Location: Rome, Italy
- Coordinates: 41°54′4″N 12°27′22″E
- Current tenants: Dicastery for the Doctrine of the Faith
- Construction started: c. 1514
- Completed: 1524–25
- Renovated: 1566–67 and 1921–25
- Client: Lorenzo Cardinal Pucci
- Owner: Holy See

Design and construction
- Architects: Giuliano Leni; Pietro Roselli; Michelangelo

Renovating team
- Architects: Pirro Ligorio; Giovanni Sallustio Peruzzi; Pietro Guidi

The Palace of the Holy Office (Italian: Palazzo del Sant'Uffizio) is a building in Rome which is an extraterritorial property of the Holy See. It houses the Holy Office of the Roman Catholic Church.

The palace is situated south of Saint Peter's Basilica near the Petrine Gate to Vatican City. The building lies outside the confines of Vatican City at the south-eastern corner of the city-state. It is one of the properties of the Holy See in Italy regulated by the 1929 Lateran Treaty signed with the Kingdom of Italy. As such, it has extraterritorial status.

The palace was first built after 1514 for Lorenzo Cardinal Pucci, and it was called Palazzo Pucci. Its façade was rebuilt in 1524–1525 by the architects Giuliano Leni, Pietro Roselli and even Michelangelo. When Pucci died in 1531, the building was still not fully completed.

In 1566–1567, the palace was purchased by Pope Pius V for 9000 scudi, and it was converted into the seat of the Holy Office. Renovation works were undertaken by Pirro Ligorio and Giovanni Sallustio Peruzzi. A complete renovation of the building was made by Pietro Guidi between 1921 and 1925.

It is where Joseph Cardinal Ratzinger formerly worked as Prefect of the Congregation of the Doctrine of the Faith. Being immediately east of the Paul VI Audience Hall, it houses the adjunct New Synod Hall.

Pope Leo XIV also resided in this Palace when he served as Prefect of the Dicastery for Bishops from 2023-2025 until the first ten months of his Papacy (May 2025-March 2026), while the Papal Apartments went through extensive renovation after being unused by his predecessor, Pope Francis.

== See also ==
- Index of Vatican City-related articles
