= Antonio Pucci (poet) =

Italian writer (1310–1388)

- Born: 1310; Republic of Florence, Italy
- Died: 1388 (aged 77–78); Republic of Florence, Italy
- Occupations: Bellfounder, town crier and versifier
- Writing career
- Language: Italian
- Period: Italian Renaissance
- Genres: Canto and literary trope
- Subjects: Tercet and terza rima
- Notable work: Centiloquio

Antonio Pucci (c. 1310–1388) was a Florentine bellfounder, town crier, self-taught as a versifier, who wrote his collection, Libro di varie storie ("Book of Various Tales"), using a popular dialect for a popular audience. In his Centiloquio he set out in terzinas ninety-one cantos' worth of chronicle from Giovanni Villani's Cronaca. In Le proprietà di Mercato Vecchio he praised, again in terzinas, the incomparable street life of Florence's crowded market piazza. In poems he could blame or praise women with equal force, a favorite medieval trope. He composed cantari in the eight-line stanzas called ottava rima, telling the subjects of courtly romance in a fast-paced narrative, with an undertone of subversive populist skepticism that undercut the very conventions that the stories embraced, full of vivid contemporary color and pious sentiment, and perhaps he declaimed them in the public squares: La Reina d'Oriente, Gismirante, Apollonio di Tiro, Brito di Brettagna, Madonna Lionessa.

During the second half of the 14th century, Florence remained a centre of culture, but its literature developed a more popular character. The best-known representative of this development was town crier Antonio Pucci, whose vast verse production includes poems on local Florentine lore as well as historical and legendary verse narratives.

About 1373, New Chronicles from Giovanni Villani was versified and produced by fellow Florentine Antonio Pucci as a rhymed version in terza rima. The poetic transcription was called Centiloquio.

== Bibliography ==
- Libro di varie storie di Antonio Pucci, edited by Alberto Varvaro, Palermo, 1957 (First modern edition).
- P. Divizia, I quindici segni del Giudizio: appunti sulla tradizione indiretta della Legenda aurea nella Firenze del Trecento, in Studi su volgarizzamenti italiani due-trecenteschi, a cura di P. Rinoldi e G. Ronchi, Roma, Viella, 2005, pp. 47–64.
- E. H. Gombrich, “Giotto's Portrait of Dante?” Burlington Magazine, Vol. 121, No. 917 (Aug., 1979), pp. 471–483. (Pucci's poem on a portrait of Dante by Giotto)
- Kleinhenz, Christopher (August 2, 2004). Medieval Italy: An Encyclopedia. Routledge. pp. 42–43. ISBN 9781135948801.
- Levin, Joan: Antonio Pucci. In: Kleinhenz, Christopher (ed.): Medieval Italy. An encyclopedia. Routledge, 2004, ISBN 0-415-93930-5, pp. 42–43 (online at Google Books)
