= Traversari =

Italian noble family

The Traversari (or domus Traversariorum, according to medieval chroniclers) are a noble Italian family. The dynasty's history was mostly connected to Ravenna, which it ruled between the 12th and 13th centuries. St. Romuald was the son of Duke Sergio degli Onesti of Ravenna and of Traversara Traversari, daughter of Teodoro Traversari, son of Paolo I Traversari.

== Legendary origins ==
According to the legend, the family's origins date back to the 5th century. The progenitor was one Teodoro, a general of the Heruli, the people led by King Odoacer, who in 476 took control of Italy. This Teodoro allegedly founded a castle in the middle of the plain created by the river Lamone, called Traversara Castle, from which his descendants would later take their surname.

After the death of Odoacer (around 490), Teodoro Traversari went into the service of the new conqueror, Theodoric, King of the Goths, being named Duke, which title would be passed to his descendants. Teodoro was appointed the Prefect of Ravenna; later he became a Patrician, then he was elected Consul. After the death of Theodoric, Italy began a rapid decline. In 553 the Byzantine completed the conquest of the Italian peninsula, establishing their capital in Ravenna. During the period of Byzantine domination, the Traversari occupied several important positions.

== History ==
=== Middle Ages ===
Girolamo Rossi sketched a family tree of the house in the book Historiarum ravennatum books (1572). He wrote that the first to use the designation of "Traversaria" was one Duke Paul, who died in 947. A branch of the family, about the year 1000, moved to Venice, where they obtained the patrician status. From here they took a new surname, as the noble Venetian family called "Lezze". The main branch of the family remained in Romagna.

The Traversari family held possessions in Ravenna and in the countryside, exercising a dominant role in the city. The Traversari extended their influence over much of the northern Adriatic. In 1024 Rustico Traversari had properties in Adria, Comacchio, Ravenna, Cervia, Imola, Faenza, Rimini, Jesi and Ancona.

Alberto Traversari (1060–1137) served under the flags of emperor Lothair II. His brother John Traversari died in 1158 during the siege of Milan, fighting under emperor Frederick I Barbarossa. Their sister Sophia was married to Peter, Duke of the Onesti, while the other brother, William, increased the power of their rule, marrying Marseilles, niece of Countess Matilda of Canossa. In 1180 Peter Traversari II (son of William) accompanied the Frederick in his meeting at Venice with Pope Alexander III, and later hosted the emperor in his palace at Ravenna. the following year Peter was the first of the family to be appointed podestà of Ravenna.

Under the Traversari family, Ravenna became a major city of the Ghibelline faction in Romagna. Despite Peter had married Emilia Guidi, the Traversari and Guidi families took arms during the 1190s for the possession of Dovadola and some castles in the area of Faenza.

Pietro III Traversari (son of Peter II) was, like his father, a protector of poets and artists. Born in 1145, he was podestà of Ravenna from 1218 to 1225. Before Peter III, a Traversari is documented as podestà of the city in 1181, 1182, 1188, 1189, 1196, 1200, 1202, 1213 and 1216. In 1226 Peter received the visit of the emperor Frederick II and helped him in the fight against the Lombard League. Paul was again podestà in 1229 and 1233. He also obtained the title of Count of Rimini by Frederick II.

At the age of 14, Paolo II Traversari (son of Pietro II) married Beatrice of Nontivoglia. Paolo II and Beatrice had twelve children, including Catherine who was the grandmother of Francesca da Rimini. Catherine married Lamberto da Polenta and she had a son named Guido Magno, who was the father of Francesca, whose murder is recorded by Dante Alighieri in his Divine Comedy (Canto V of Inferno).

=== Exile from Ravenna ===
In Romagna the power of Traversari was opposed by the counts of Bagnacavallo and Cunio and, in Ravenna, by the Dusdei family, headed by Guido, who was succeeded by his son Ubertino. This led to open warfare in the 1218. On 2 October 1218, the Traversari attacked the Dusdei and their allies, forcing them to leave the city. In November the exiles retaliated by destroying the Traversari properties at Bertinoro.

In 1239, after having been a Ghibelline supporter of the emperor, the family sided for the pro-papal Guelphs. The emperor's reaction was immediate. Frederick II, after three days of siege, conquered Ravenna and drove the Traversari out (August 15, 1240). Among the exiles, Traversara Traversari married Tommaso Fogliani of Reggio, Count of Romagna and nephew of Pope Innocent IV, who was able to return to Ravenna. At his death, Traversara married to Stephen, son of Andrew, Duke of Calabria. The last will of Frederick II (who died in 1250) allowed Ayca Traversari (daughter of Paolo II Traversari) to return to Ravenna and, after several disputes, to regain possession of the family properties. Between 1253 and 1270 there was a period of relative calm in Ravenna, thanks to the control of Archbishop Philip, but after his death the feuds resumed, involving the Traversari, the da Polenta, the Malatesta and the Montefeltro.

=== Fall of Ravenna ===
In 1275, Teodoro Traversari (son of Anastasio) lost the position of podestà of Ravenna, which was thenceforth ruled by the da Polenta. The family mostly settled in Venice, though some members moved to the Apennines, to Portico di Romagna and to the Montone Valley. The da Polenta and their successors did not allow the Traversari to return to Ravenna.

Teodoro Traversari went into exile in Constantinople along with his son Giovanni. Taddeo Traversari with his sons Pietro e Tommaso were mercenary captains under the banner of the German emperor Louis IV of Bavaria. The lineage was continued by Giacomo Traversari, son of Pietro VI, and by his son Loth, grandfather of St. Ambrose Traversari. In 1431 Ambrose became Prior General of the Camaldolese Order.

At Portico di Romagna, threatened by the Manfredi Faenza, the Traversari swore obedience to the Republic of Florence. Some Traversari took the last name of Fabbri, continuing to use this surname for a long time, as appears in Florentine municipal documents. There are also records of Traversari in Istria, probably having arrived from Venice. Among the descendants were humanist Luigi Traversari, professor at the University of Padua in 1443.

== The Traversari and the arts ==
The names of Pietro Traversari and of other family members are mentioned in the poems of troubadours such as William de la Tor, of Alberto from Sisteron, of Amerigo from Peguilhan. In the Italian literature, the Traversari family was mentioned by Dante Alighieri (in Divine Comedy). He mentions Pietro III (c. 1145 - 1225) as an example of Romagna's people of his time, who had lost the good qualities of their ancestors (Canto XIV of Purgatory). Paolo II Traversari (Pietro II's son) is quoted in a story of Novellino by Giovanni Boccaccio (Decameron, day V). This story has been illustrated by Sandro Botticelli in 1483.

== See also ==
- St. Ambrose Traversari
- Gabriel Traversari
