= Puccio Pucci (lawyer) =

Italian lawyer

Giuseppe Pucci
Personal information
- Nationality: Italian
- Born: 12 April 1904 Florence
- Died: 15 January 1985 (aged 80) Pomezia

Sport
- Country: Italy
- Sport: Athletics
- Event: Middle-distance running
- Club: Giglio Rosso Firenze

Puccio Pucci (12 April 1904 – 15 January 1985) was an Italian athlete (middle-distance runner), lawyer and sports official.

== Biography ==
Puccio Pucci competed at the 1924 Summer Olympics. He was the son of the notary Pietro Pucci, a former director of the Federazione Italiana di Atletica Leggera and of the FIDAL he was general secretary from 1931 to 1938. His father was killed in Libya during World War II. As right-hand-man to Alessandro Pavolini, the secretary of the Partito Fascista Repubblicano, Puccio helped form the infamous Black Brigades.

Upon the Armistice, on 18 March 1944 he was made president of the Italian National Olympic Committee on the basis of his experience with FIDAL. After many months in post, he was definitively removed from the national sporting movement of the "Kingdom of the South", officially from 28 June 1944, when presidente del consiglio of free Italy Ivanoe Bonomi appointed commissario Giulio Onesti.
