= Roberto Pucci =

Roberto Pucci (Florence, 1463 – Rome, 17 January 1547) was an Italian cardinal from the Florentine noble family of the Pucci.

== Life ==
One of the Medici's keenest supporters, he nevertheless advised Pope Clement VII against starting the siege of Florence in 1529. He began his career by holding several significant civil posts in Florence, such as in the court of duke Alessandro de' Medici, who set up the new constitution which put an end to the republic of Florence.

He married and had four children, but on his wife's death in 1526, he decided to be ordained to the priesthood and moved to Rome. There he was made bishop of Pistoia in 1541, encouraged by his nephew Antonio who had just given up that post himself. (Roberto's brother Lorenzo Pucci was also a bishop and cardinal.)

Roberto was later made a cardinal by Pope Paul III in the 2 June 1542 consistory. In October 1542, Roberto baptised Roberto Bellarmino (Bellarmino had been named after Pucci). Roberto Pucci was later made bishop of the united dioceses of Melfi and Rapolla and Major Penitentiary.

== See also ==
- Pucci, for other members of this family and holders of this surname

Records
Preceded by Sigismondo Pappacoda	Oldest living Member of the Sacred College; 3 November 1536 - 17 1547	Succeeded by Ennio Filonardi
