= Palazzo Pucci, Florence =

Building in Florence, Italy

Coordinates: 43°46′27.96″N 11°15′27.31″E

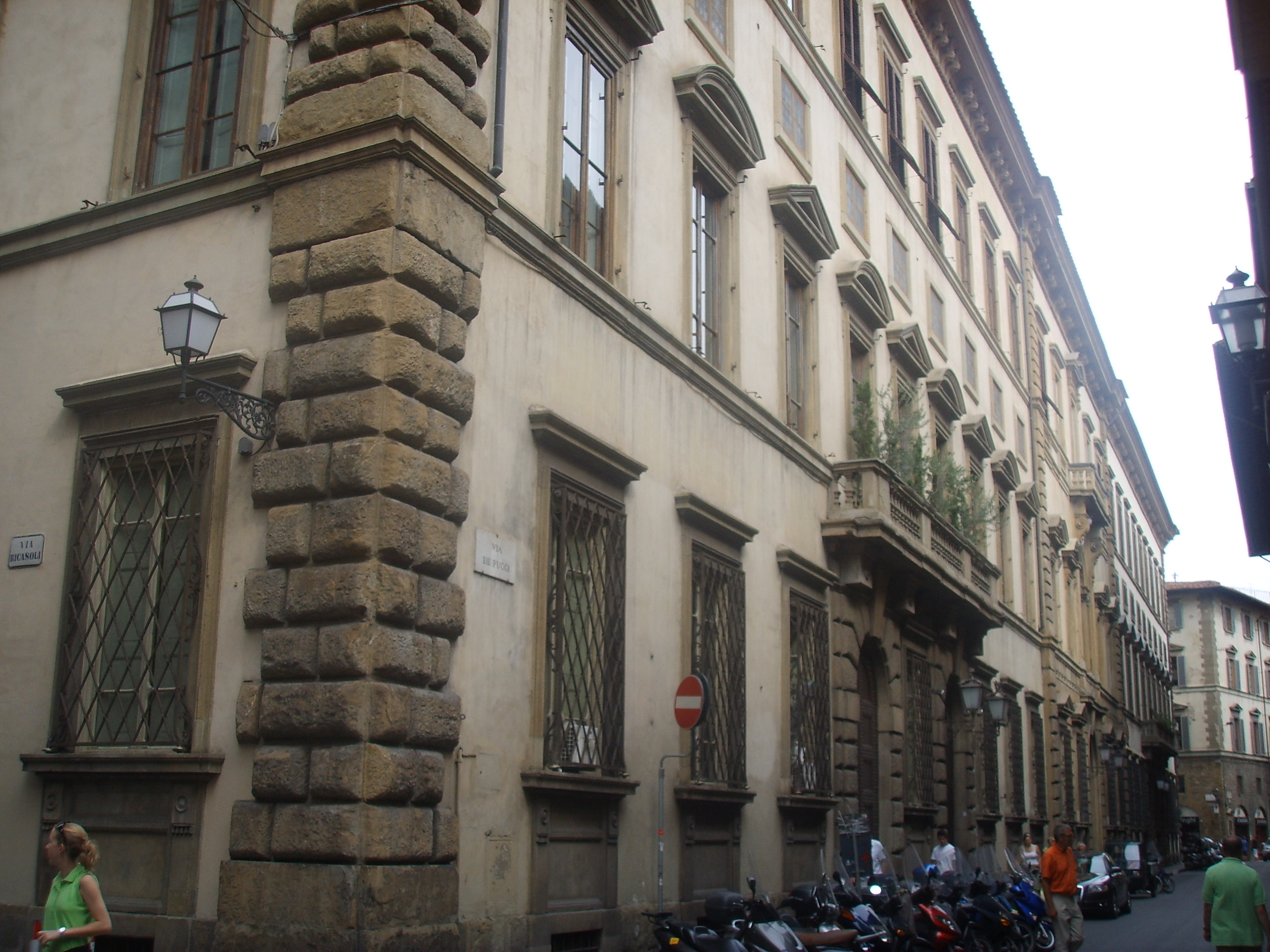
Façade of the palace

The Palazzo Pucci is a palace located at Via dei Pucci 4 in central Florence in the region of Tuscany, Italy. The façade of the palace spans from Via dei Servi to Via Ricasoli.

== History ==
The site was owned by a member of the aristocratic Pucci family since around 1480. The present palace was designed around 1748 by the architect Paolo Falconieri, and the adjacent site was built by Gherardo Silvani.

The central and oldest part of the palace was commissioned in the 16th century by cardinal Lorenzo Pucci. The façade still displays his coat of arms under the balcony. Much of the palace has remained in the possession of the Pucci family since this time.

One part of the palace was owned by the Baciocchi family, who rented part to the American sculptor Horatio Greenough. This palace is now occupied by the Archdiocese of Florence. The corner has a coat of arms of Pope Leo X sculpted by Baccio da Montelupo.

On the arch of the piano nobile (first floor) above the entrance portal is the coat of arms of the Pucci family. The coat of arms depicts a Moor with a head-band. It is unclear why they used this profile of a black man for an emblem; some theories claim that an ancestor was a Saracini (or Saracen). Some claim the three hammers or crosses on the headband symbolize membership in the Carpenters’ Guild, or three letter “T”s, an acronym of the family motto: Tempore tempora tempera (“Alleviate troubles with time”). In1483 The Story of Nastagio Degli Onesti by Botticelli series of four, possibly commissioned by Lorenzo the Magnificent in 1483 to donate to Giannozzo Pucci on the occasion of his wedding to Lucrezia Bini that year.The four were held in the Palazzo Pucci in Florence until 1868, when they were sold.

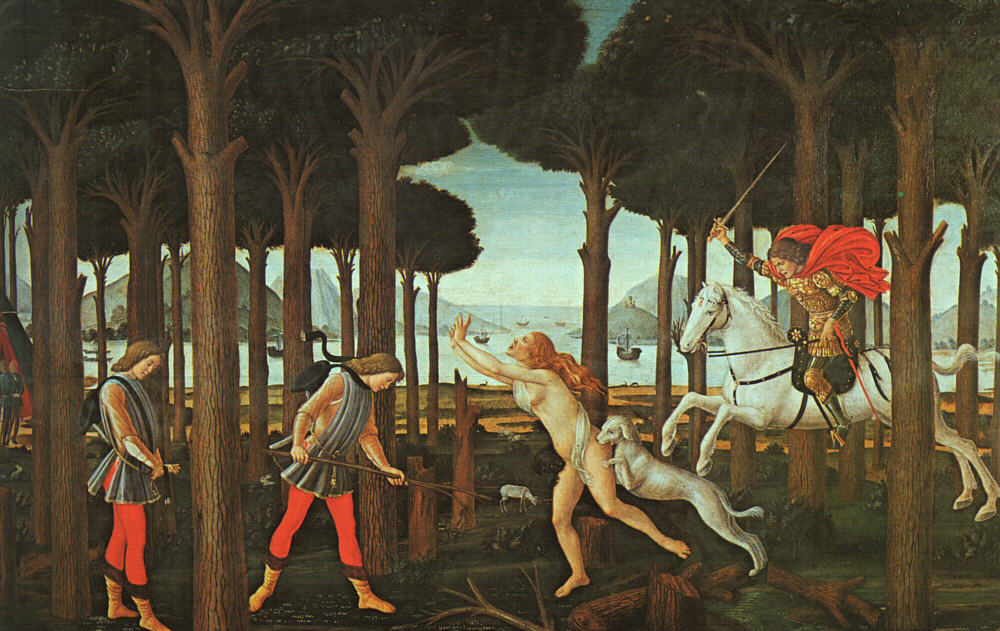
"The Story of Nastagio Degli Onesti by Botticelli, 1"

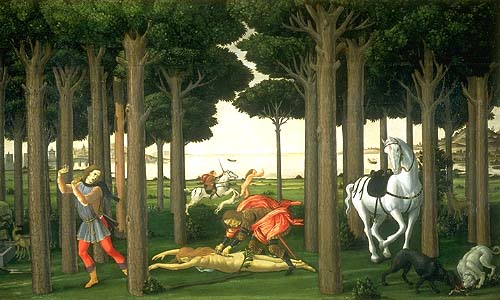
"The Story of Nastagio Degli Onesti by Botticelli, 2"

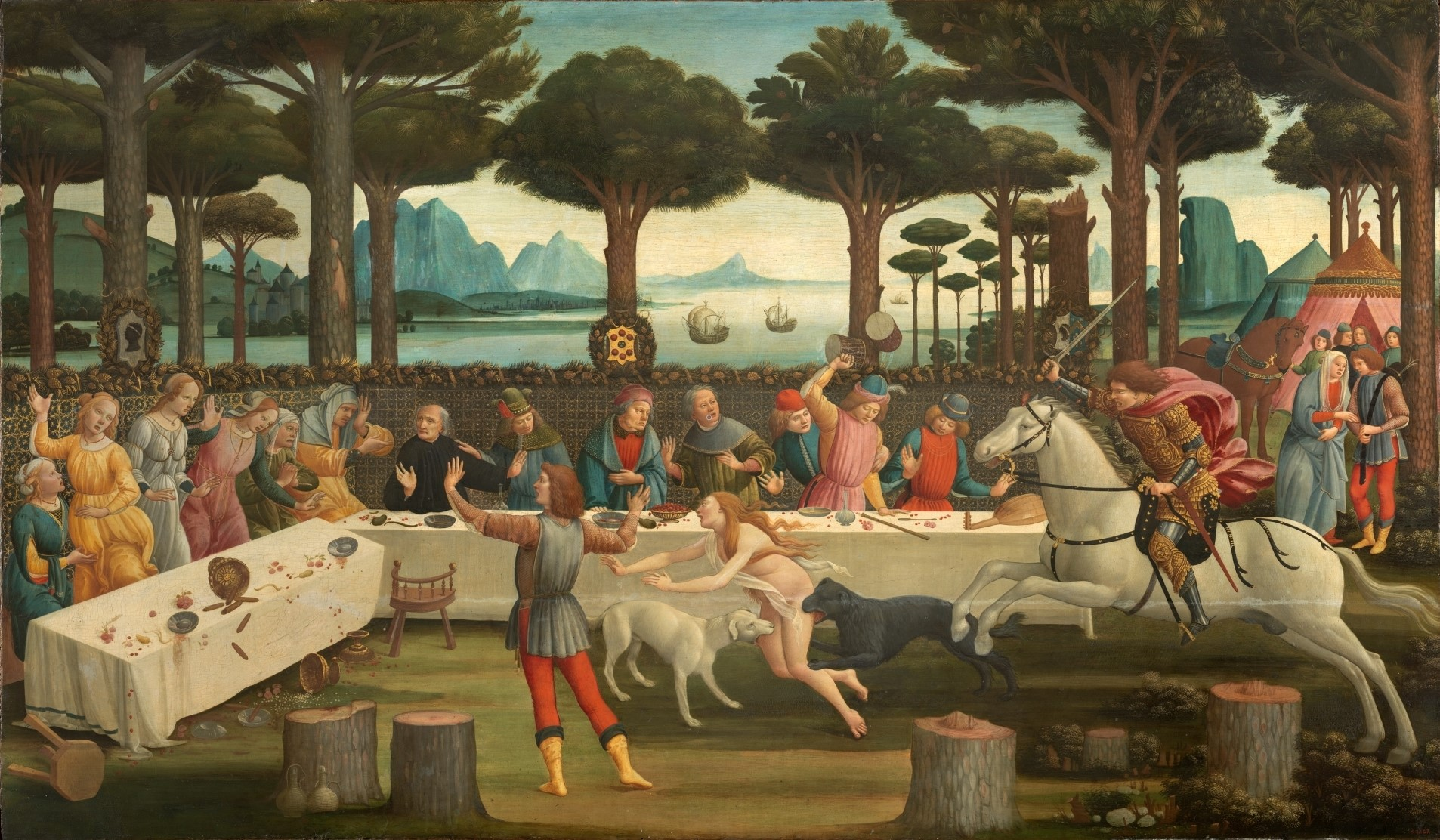
"The Story of Nastagio Degli Onesti by Botticelli, 3"

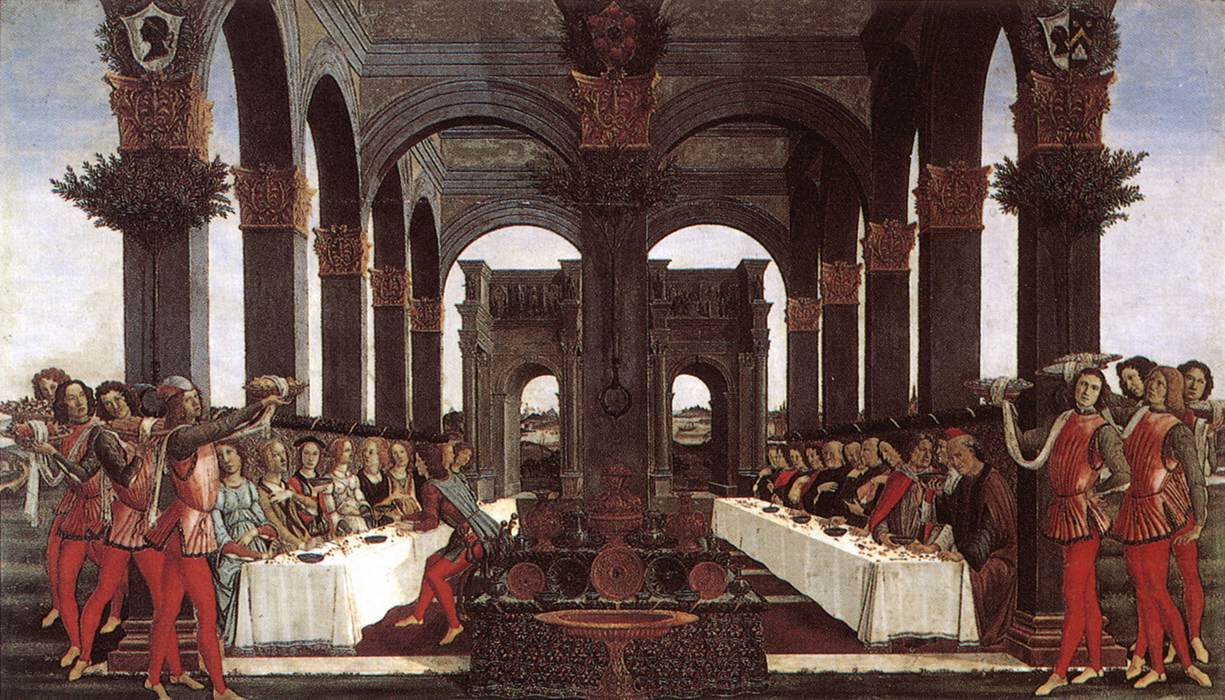
"The Story of Nastagio Degli Onesti by Botticelli, 4"
