= Antonio Pucci (cardinal) =

Italian cardinal of the Catholic Church

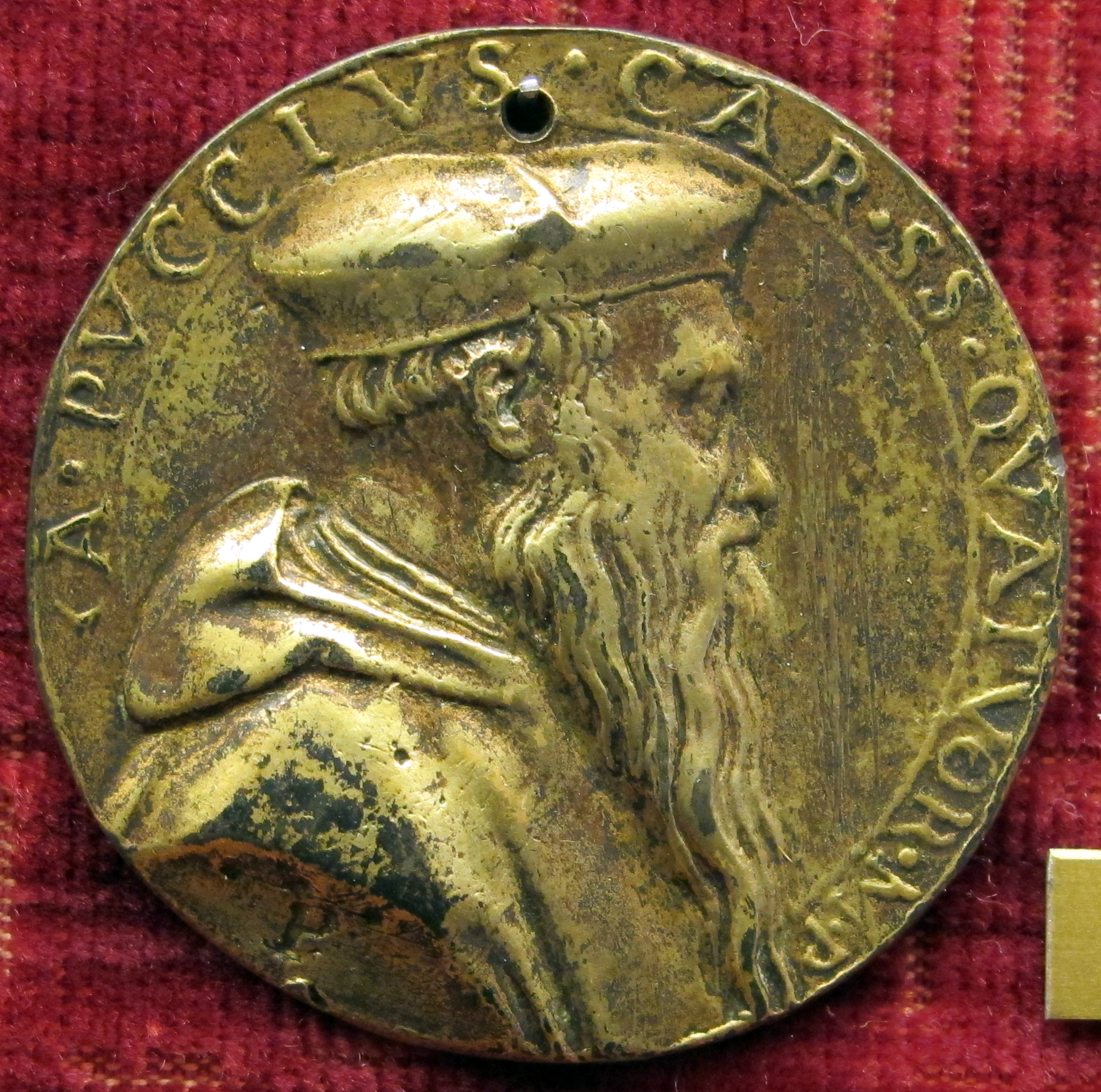
Medal depicting the effigy of Cardinal Antonio Pucci

Antonio Pucci (born 8 October 1485 – 12 October 1544) was an Italian cardinal belonging to the ancient Florentine Pucci noble family. He was the son of Alessandro Pucci and Sibilla di Francesco Sassetti, and the nephew of Cardinals Lorenzo Pucci and Roberto Pucci.

Pucci played a significant role in the Catholic Church, serving in various positions, including bishop of Pistoia and papal nuncio in Switzerland. His influence extended through his participation in major Church councils and diplomatic missions.

== Biography ==
Pucci was born on 8 October 1485 in Florence. He attended the University of Pisa.

On 7 March 1510, the feast of St Thomas, Pucci delivered the annual encomium in honour of the "Angelic Doctor" at the Santa Maria sopra Minerva studium generale, later known as the Pontifical University of St. Thomas Aquinas, Angelicum.

After participating in the Fifth Lateran Council (1512–1517), he served as Apostolic Nuncio in Switzerland from 1517 to 1521. In 1518, he was appointed Bishop of Pistoia. From 1529 to 1541, Pucci served as Bishop of Vannes, and on 1 October 1529, he was appointed Penitentiary Major.

Pucci was elevated to cardinal by Pope Clement VII on 22 September 1531, receiving Santi Quattro Coronati as his titular church. He participated in the 1534 papal conclave, which elected Pope Paul III. Later, he became Bishop of Albano (1542/43) and Sabina (1543/44). He died on 12 October 1544 in Bagnoregio.

== Episcopal succession ==
While bishop, Pucci was the principal consecrator of:

- Onofrio Bartolini de' Medici, Archbishop of Pisa (1531);
- Giannotto Pucci, Bishop of Melfi (1531);
- Vincenzo Durante, Bishop of Orvieto (1531);
- Meday, Bishop (1535);
- Pierre Van Der Worst, Bishop of Acqui (1535);
- Nicolás de Aragón, Bishop of Bosa (1537);
- Giovanni Maria Canigiani, Titular Bishop of Hippos and Auxiliary Bishop of Pistoia (1540);
- Jan Wilamowski (also Jan z Gierałtowic Wilamowski), of the Saszor coat of arms, Bishop of Kamianets (1540);

Additionally, he was the principal consecrator of:

- Jérome Balbi, Bishop of Gurk (1523).
