= Puccio Pucci (politician) =

Italian politician (1389–1449)

Puccio Pucci (Florence, 1 September 1389 – 7 May 1449) was a Florentine politician and the founder of the main branch of the Pucci family. Pucci served as magistrate in the Florentine wars against Lucca, Milan, and Volterra.

His oldest son, Antonio Pucci (1418-1484) was elected as the gonfaloniere di giustizia in 1463 and again in 1481; this role was nominal head of the Florentine government.
