= Lorenzo Pucci =

Italian cardinal and bishop

His Eminence Lorenzo Pucci
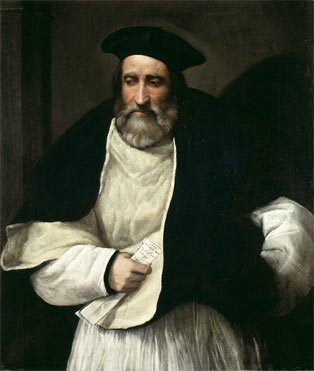
- Cardinal Lorenzo Pucci by Parmigianino, c. 1529–30 (National Gallery)
- Church: Santi Quattro Coronati
- Diocese: Pistoia, Melfi, Vannes, Amalfi, Montefiascone, Capaccio
- Other posts: Major Penitentiary, protector of the Poles

Orders
- Created cardinal: 23 September 1513

Personal details
- Born: Lorenzo Pucci; 18 August 1458 Florence
- Died: 16 September 1531 (aged 73) Rome
- Occupation: Law professor
- Coat of arms

Lorenzo Pucci (18 August 1458 – 16 September 1531) was an Italian cardinal and bishop from the Florentine Pucci family. His brother Roberto Pucci and his nephew Antonio Pucci also became cardinals.

== Biography ==
Pucci was born in Florence.

He began his career as a professor of law at the Studio di Pisa. On becoming a clergyman, he was elected Bishop-Coadjutor of Pistoia in 1509, assuming the diocese in September 1518 but resigning it that November in favour of his nephew Antonio Pucci. He was also bishop-administrator of the diocese of Melfi from 1513 to 1528 and participated in the Fifth Lateran Council.

Pope Leo X made him a cardinal in the 23 September 1513 consistory (with the titulus of Santi Quattro Coronati) and chose him as his personal secretary, in which role he was sent on several ambassadorial missions, especially to Florence, where the pope wanted gonfaloniere-for-life Piero Soderini to retire from office. On 10 August 1521, Leo made Pucci the Commendatore of the monastery of San Giovanni in Fiore. He also served as administrator of the Diocese of Vannes (1513–1514), of the Archdiocese of Amalfi (in 1516 – 1519), the Diocese of Montefiascone (March – April 1519) and the Diocese of Capaccio (September 1522 – June 1523). From 1514 he was the Holy See's protector of the Poles and from 1520 to 1529 Major Penitentiary. He was a patron of the arts, notably of Michelangelo and Raphael, whilst in 1520 he also became the dedicatee of Erasmus' edition of the Works of St. Cyprian.

Under pope Adrian VI, Pucci was accused of fraud in connection with the sale of indulgences, but he escaped punishment thanks to the intercession of Cardinal Giulio Medici, who after his election to the papacy in 1523 as Pope Clement VII cleared Pucci of all charges. In 1526 Clement entered on the War of the League of Cognac against Charles V, in which Clement was defeated and captured and Rome sacked. Upon the post-war rapprochement which Clement and Charles soon reached, Pucci was one of the keenest advocates of quickly reconquering Florence from Republican rebels. He then served as Cardinal-Bishop of Albano (1524) and Palestrina (1524–1531).

He died in Rome on 16 September 1531, shortly after the siege of Florence which definitively restored the Medici to power in Florence.

== Bibliography ==
- Gregorovius, Ferdinand (1904). Lucretia Borgia, according to original documents and correspondence of her day (third ed.). New York: Appleton. pp. 65–70.
