= Palazzo Bezzoli =

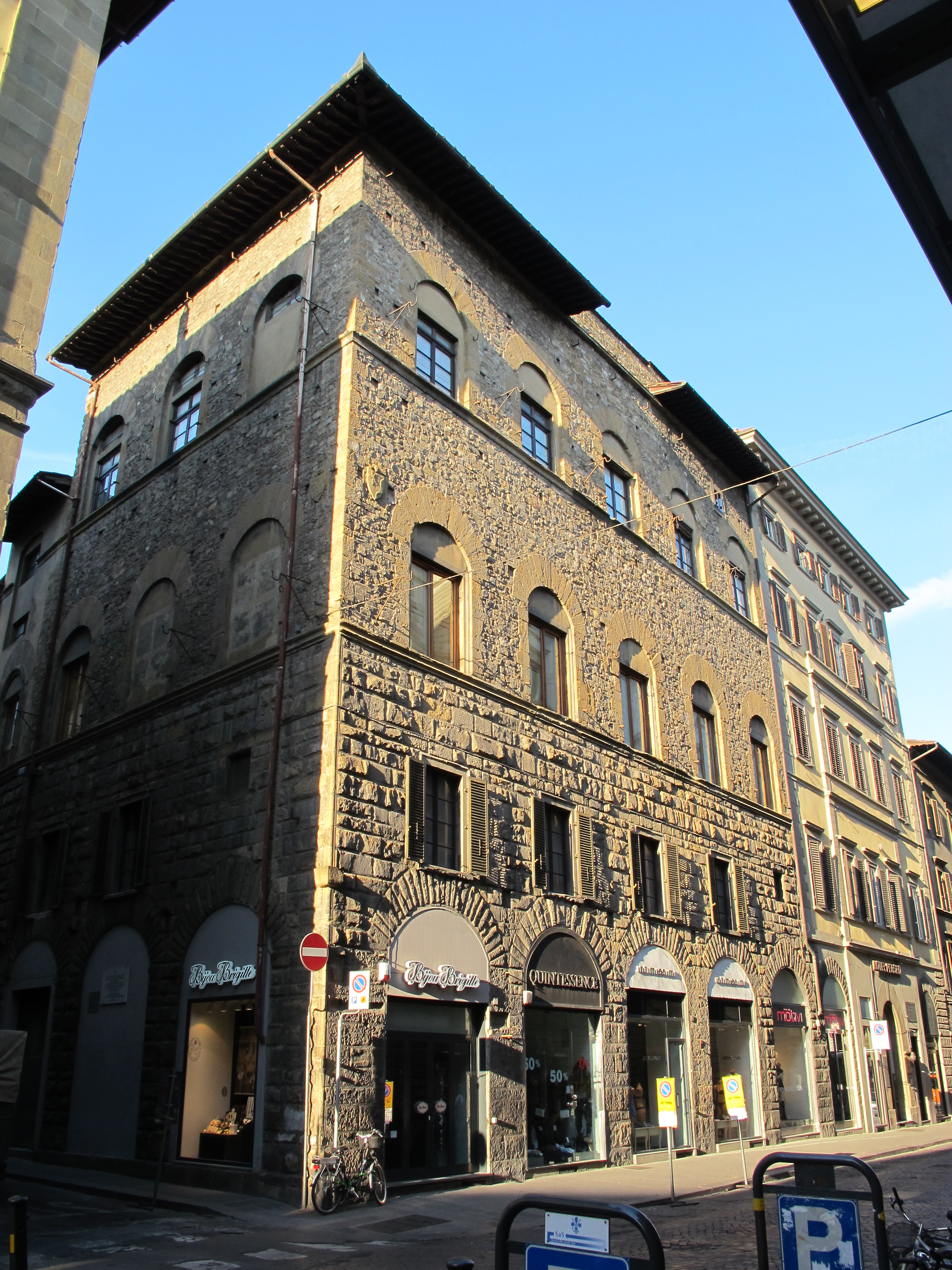
- Facade of the Palazzo Bezzoli in via dei Cerretani corner Piazza dell'Olio 3
- Interactive map of the Palazzo Bezzoli area
- Alternative names: Palazzo Bezzoli, albergo dell'Aquila, casa Martelli

General information
- Status: In use
- Type: Palace
- Architectural style: Mannerist
- Location: Florence, Italy, 3, via dei Cerretani corner Piazza dell'Olio
- Coordinates: 43.773342°N 11.253911°E
- Construction started: 14th century
- Completed: 14th century

Design and construction
- Architect: Bezzole di Forte Bezzole

Palazzo Bezzoli, or Del Bembo or Martelli, is a civic building in the historical centre of Florence, located between via dei Cerretani 11r-13r-15r-17r-19r and piazza dell'Olio 3. The palazzo (as Bezzuoli) appears in the list drawn up in 1901 by the General Directorate of Antiquities and Fine Arts, as a monumental building to be considered national artistic heritage (Italy).

== History and description ==
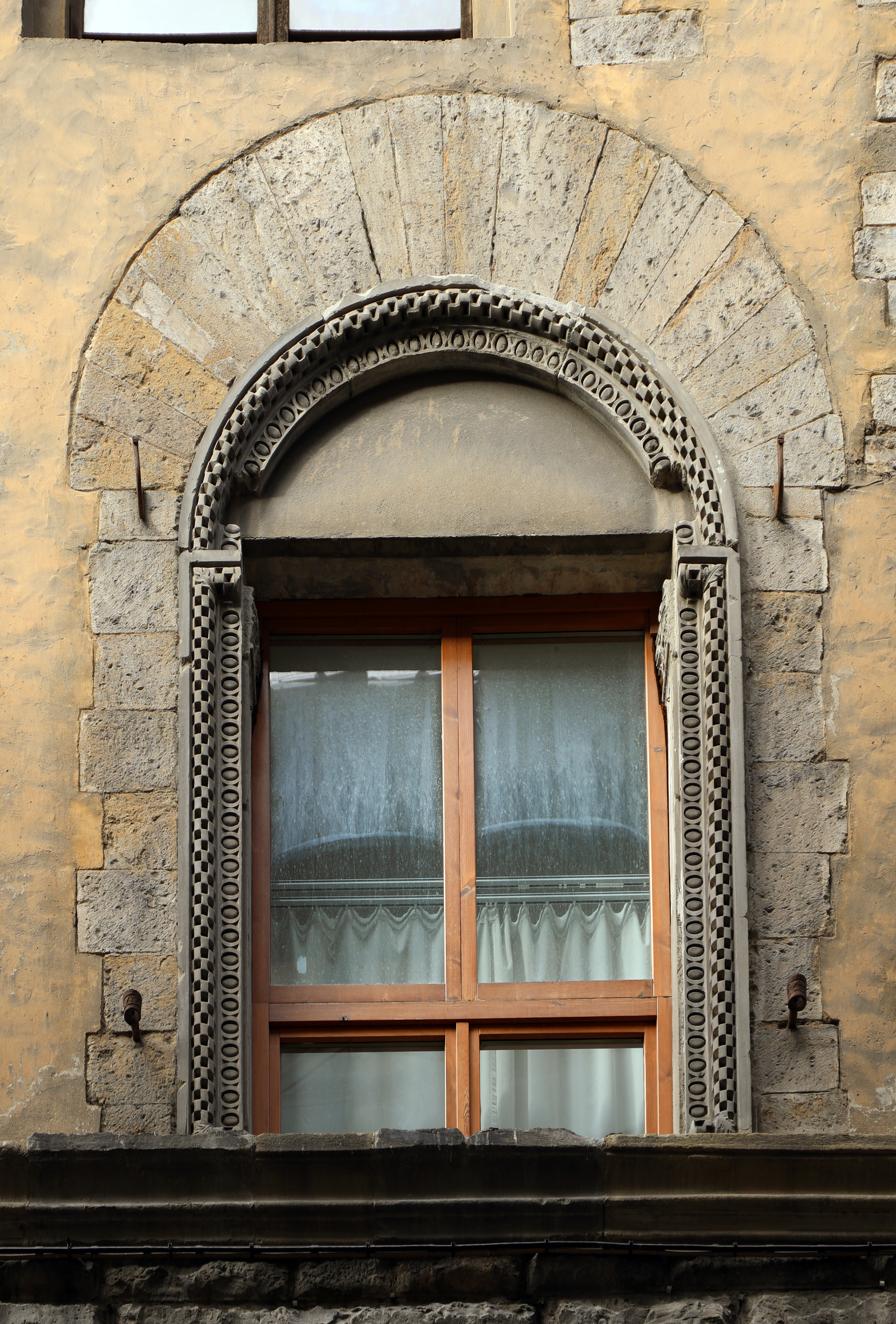
The «brunelleschian» window

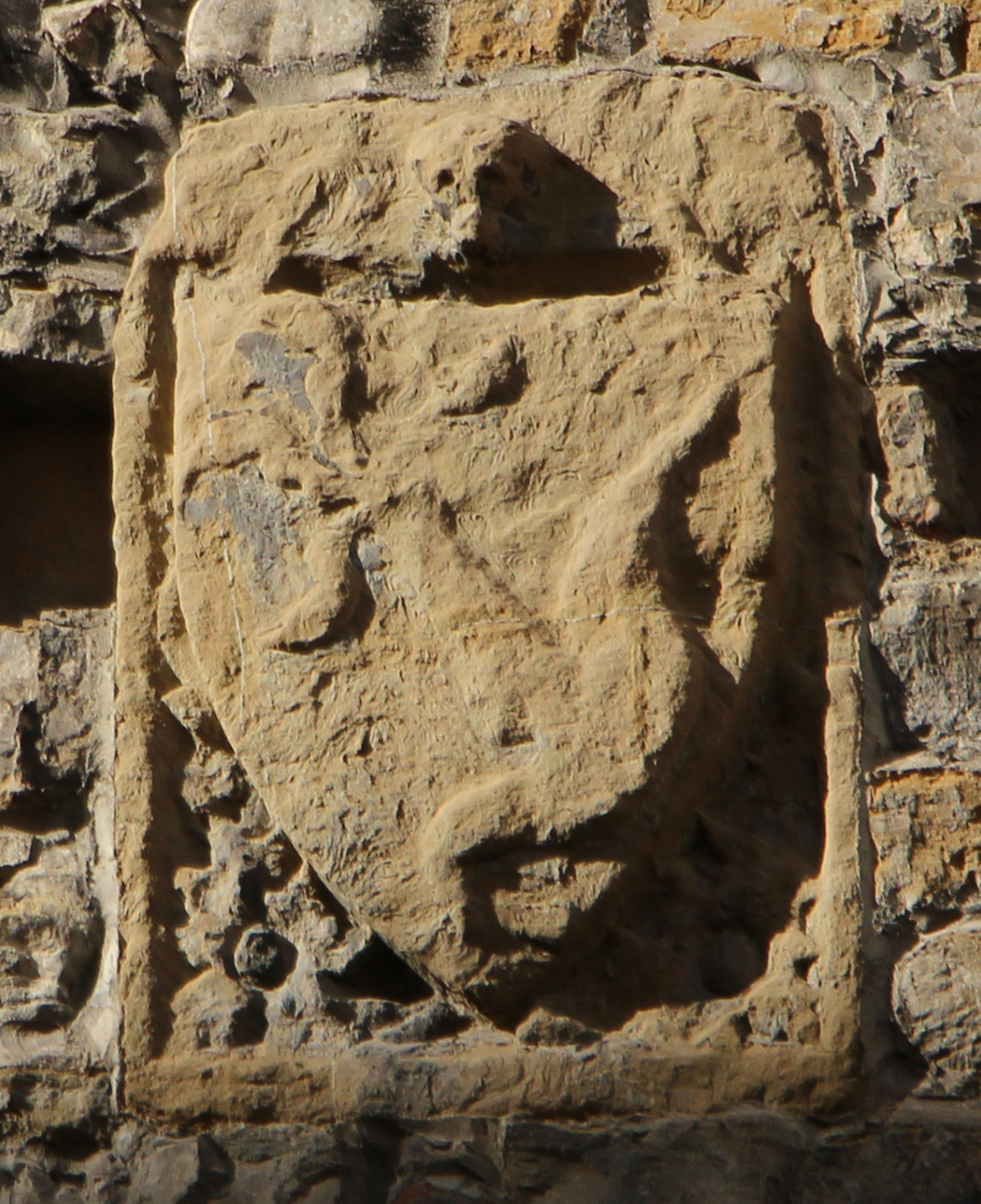
Bezzoli coat of arms

It was built for the Bezzole family of Forte Bezzole (later Bezzoli or Bezzuoli) in the early 14th century, with the intervention traditionally referred to as Arnolfo di Cambio, master builder of the nearby Duomo di Firenze; Arnolfo himself is said to have established his workshop on the ground floor and possibly also lived there (news, however, not supported by any direct documentation).

The palace, walled in on four main vaults, responded to the new typology of private patrician residence, with a body larger than the tower-house, but still characterised by a purely vertical development; on the ground floor, typical of families with important mercantile activities, large rooms with arched doorways were opened to house workshops and fondaci, which are still used for commercial activities today. On the cantonment, on the second floor, are two shields with the Bezzoli arms (the griffin branch on the band) eroded and without enamel but still legible.

«One of the buildings that preserves almost intact the severe and grandiose character of the Florentine palaces of the Middle Ages […]. The façade is entirely of strong stone, the arched bar windows are lined by robust recurring cornices, while the ground part consists of a series of large arches supported by piers, each supported by rusticated ashlar stone. In the 15th century it was perhaps thought to give it a less severe and more elegant appearance, but the work begun with the beautiful decorations of a window, was interrupted, and the palace, less minor disfigurements, has come down to us with its original 13th-century forms».

Also according to tradition, that ornately framed window on Piazza dell’Olio, reported by Guido Carocci, would have been designed by Filippo Brunelleschi. There is, however, no documentary evidence that can give any foundation to these popular rumours, which, in a nutshell, would unite the names of the two most famous Florentine architects in the same building.

Mazzino Fossi specifies: 'The main body is at nos. 11r-21r and on the Piazza dell’Olio. There where n. 1 is, the building, with medieval traces on the ground floor, has a 19th-century makeover'. At the end of the 18th century (and again at the beginning of the next) the hotel of the Black Eagle was here. On the side of Piazza dell’Olio is a recent memorial (placed there in 2006) in memory of Wolfgang Amadeus Mozart's stay in that hotel during his first trip to Florence in 1770.

The palazzo then possibly passed to the Del Bembo family (under whose name it is recorded in some repertories and who lived in the nearby palazzo in Piazza dell’Olio) and then to the Martelli. In the 19th century it was spared from the extension of Via Cerretani, as it was located on the side of the street not affected by the works.

In more recent times, from 1918 to 1962, the writer and critic Piero Santi lived here and, as Cecconi recalls, «in the second half of the 1930s, his house in Piazza dell’Olio was frequented above all by his friends Franco Fortini, Alessandro Parronchi, Franco Calamandrei, Valentino Bucchi, Manlio Cancogni and Carlo Cassola». It was at this address that Santi founded the art gallery L’Indiano in 1950, which was directed by his friend Paolo Marini until 1985 and where artists such as Ottone Rosai, Ernesto Treccani, Renato Guttuso gravitated.

== See also ==
- Casa Acciaiuoli
- Palazzo Neroni

== Bibliography ==
=== Italian sources ===
- Lorenzo Cantini, Saggi istorici d'antichità toscane, Firenze, Stamperia Albizziniana, 1797, VII, pp. 62–64;
- Federico Fantozzi, Nuova guida ovvero descrizione storico artistico critica della città e contorni di Firenze, Firenze, Giuseppe e fratelli Ducci, 1842, p. 491;
- Federico Fantozzi, Pianta geometrica della città di Firenze alla proporzione di 1 a 4500 levata dal vero e corredata di storiche annotazioni, Firenze, Galileiana, 1843, p. 98, n. 210;
- Nuova guida della città di Firenze ossia descrizione di tutte le cose che vi si trovano degne d’osservazione, con piante e vedute, ultima edizione compilata da Giuseppe François, Firenze, Vincenzo Bulli, 1850, p. 135;
- L’illustratore fiorentino. Calendario storico per l’anno ..., a cura di Guido Carocci, Firenze, Tipografia Domenicana, 1880, pp. 96–97;
- Guido Carocci, Firenze scomparsa. Ricordi storico-artistici, Firenze, Galletti e Cocci, 1897, pp. 32, 141; Elenco 1902, p. 252;
- Walther Limburger, Die Gebäude von Florenz: Architekten, Strassen und Plätze in alphabetischen Verzeichnissen, Lipsia, F.A. Brockhaus, 1910, n. 110;
- Antiche fabbriche, in "Arte e Storia", XXXIII, 1914, 11, pp. 346–347;
- L’illustratore fiorentino. Calendario storico per l’anno ..., a cura di Guido *Carocci, Firenze, Tipografia Domenicana, (1915) 1914, pp. 36–37;
- Risposte a domande, in "Arte e Storia", XXXIV, 1915, 8, pp. 251–252.
- Walther Limburger, Le costruzioni di Firenze, traduzione, aggiornamenti bibliografici e storici a cura di Mazzino Fossi, Firenze, Soprintendenza ai Monumenti di Firenze, 1968 (dattiloscritto presso la Biblioteca della Soprintendenza per i Beni Architettonici e per il Paesaggio per le province di Firenze Pistoia e Prato, 4/166), n. 110;
- I Palazzi fiorentini. Quartiere di San Giovanni, introduzione di Piero Bargellini, schede dei palazzi di Marcello Jacorossi, Firenze, Comitato per l’Estetica Cittadina, 1972, p. 34, n. 51, p. 128, n. 237;
- Piero Bargellini, Ennio Guarnieri, Le strade di Firenze, 4 voll., Firenze, Bonechi, 1977–1978, I, 1977, p. 237; II, 1977, p. 345;
- Franco Cesati, Le strade di Firenze. Storia, aneddoti, arte, segreti e curiosità della città più affascinante del mondo attraverso 2400 vie, piazze e canti, 2 voll., Roma, Newton & Compton editori, 2005, I, p. 160; II, p. 432;
- Franco Cesati, Le piazze di Firenze. Storia, arte, folclore e personaggi che hanno reso famosi i duecento palcoscenici storici della città più amata nel mondo, Roma, Newton & Compton editori, 2005, p. 153;
- Andrea Cecconi, Le case della memoria. Un itinerario letterario nella Firenze del ‘900, Firenze, Giampiero Pagnini Editore, 2009, pp. 187–188.
