= Palazzo Busini Bardi =

Coordinates: 43°46′2.99″N 11°15′32.75″E

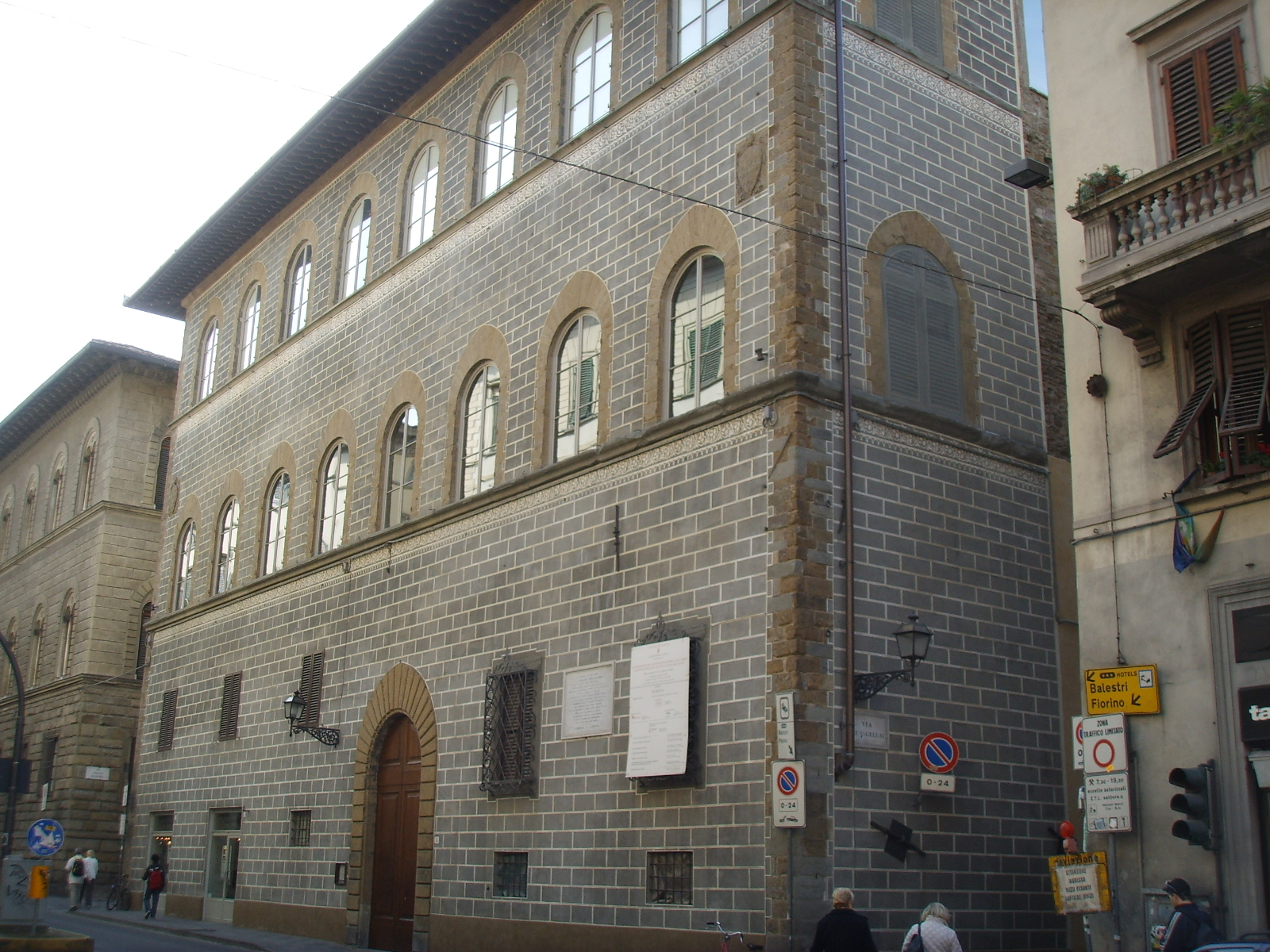
Palazzo Busini Bardi

The Palazzo Busini Bardi, also known as Palazzo Bardi Alle Grazie, is a 15th-century palace located on Via dei Benci #5 in central Florence, Tuscany, Italy. It is in front of the Museo Horne.

The palace was notable as the home of the Count Giovanni de' Bardi and as the gathering place of his Florentine Camerata, a group of poets, music theorists, and humanists who contributed to the transition from the Renaissance to the Baroque and to the creation of opera.

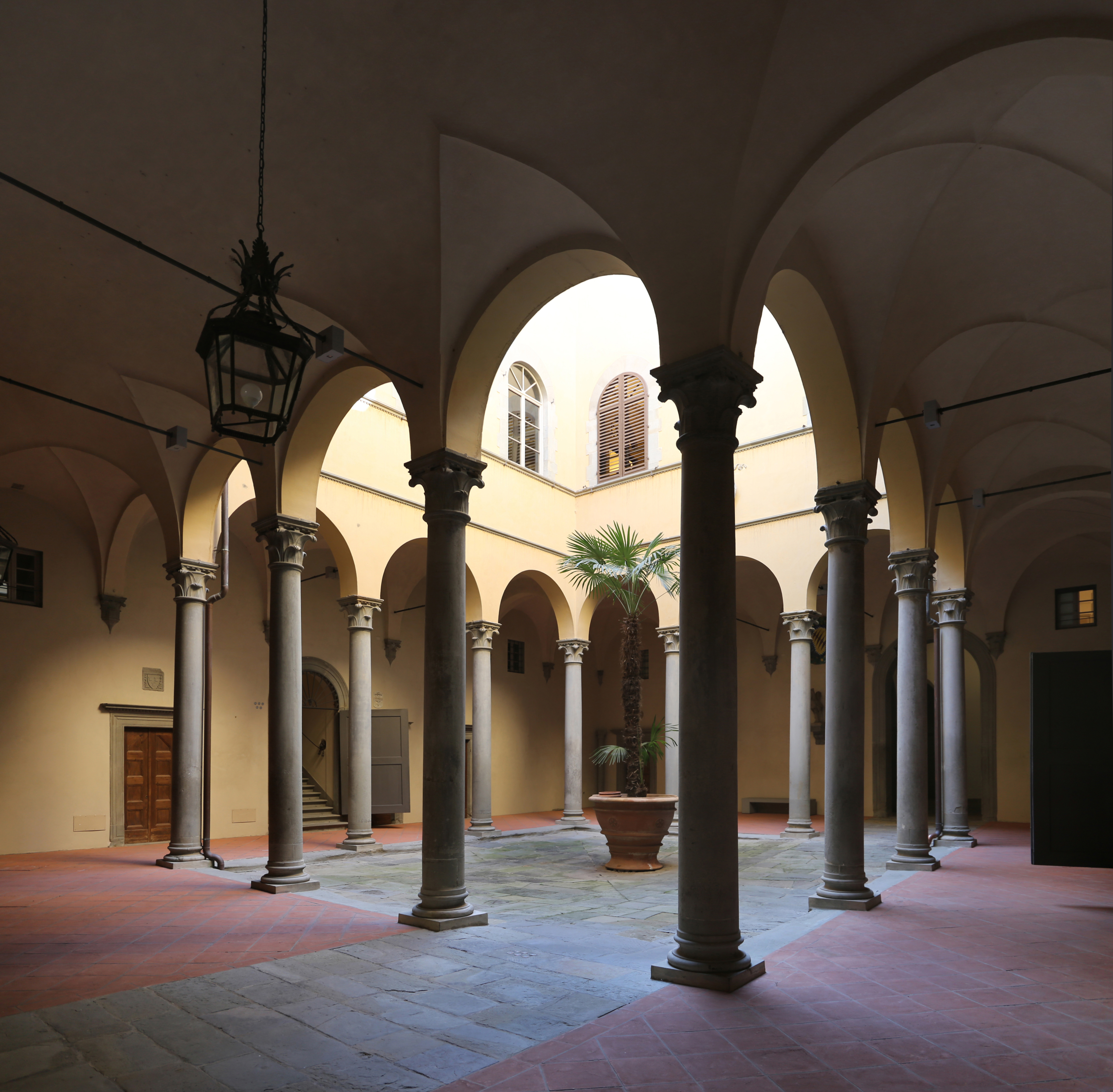
The Brunelleschi courtyard

Design of the palace (circa 1430) was attributed to the architect Filippo Brunelleschi by the sixteenth-century art biographer Giorgio Vasari.

== See also ==
- Palazzo Bezzoli
- Palazzo Medici-Riccardi
- Palazzo Pitti
