= Kneeling windows =

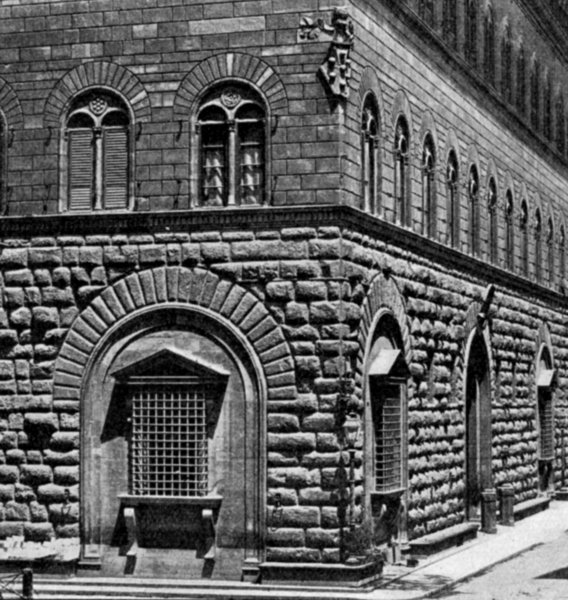
Kneeling windows of Palazzo Medici-Riccardi

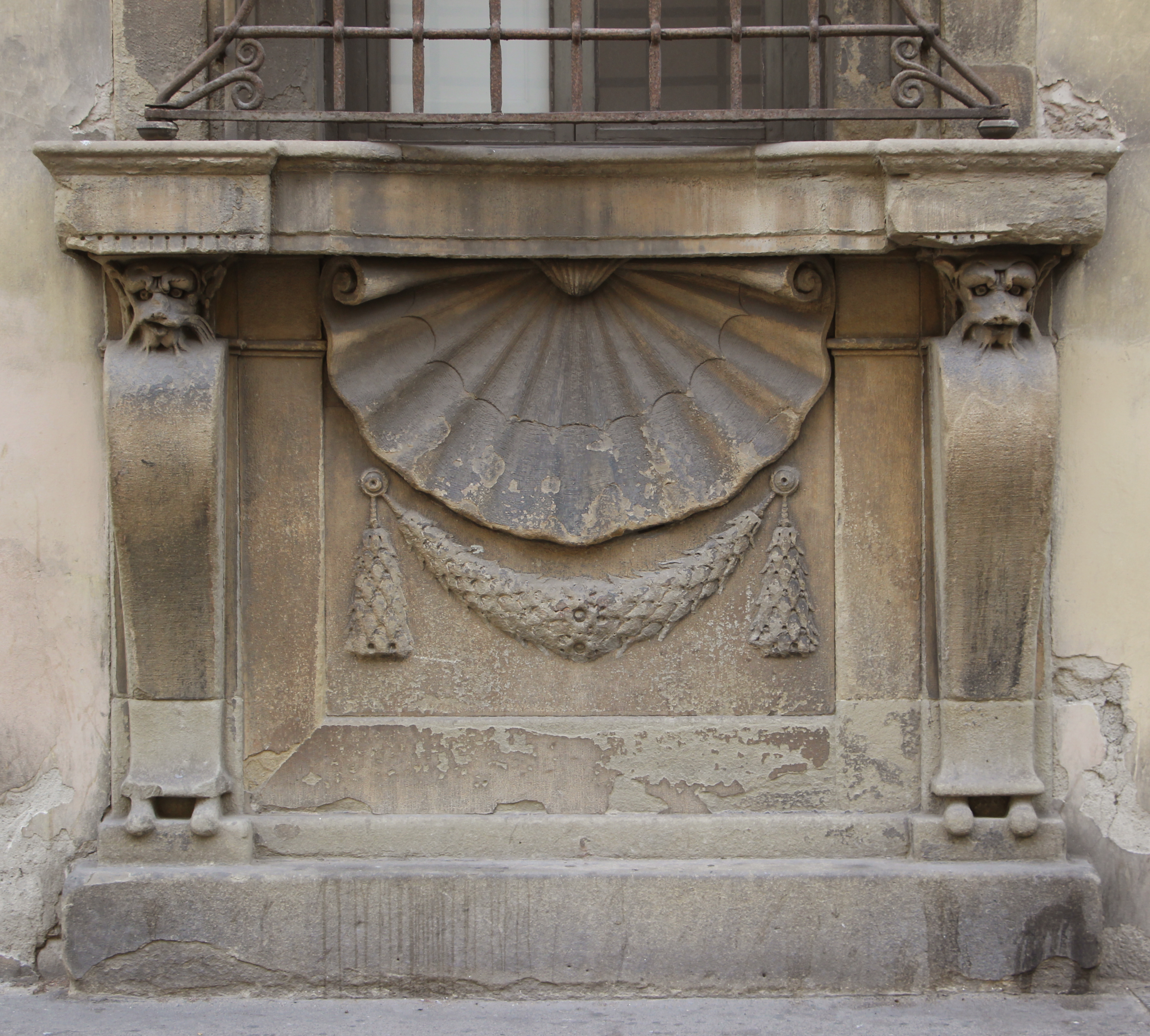
Tablet and jambs of a window of the Casino Mediceo di San Marco.

Kneeling windows (Italian: Finestra inginocchiata) is a type of opening used from the fifteenth century, especially in the Tuscany area.

== History ==
It is a monumental type used especially on the ground floor: the sill rests on supports protruding that resemble those of a kneeler's bench. Typical of the Mannerist and Tuscan Baroque periods, it is usually enclosed by a grille, framed and crowned by tympanum, sometimes with decorations, often zoomorphic: for example, the two supports are often carved as lion's paws and sometimes the space between them is decorated with a bas-relief.

The first kneeling window is traditionally the one in Palazzo Medici Riccardi in Florence, attributed to Michelangelo. It was made to occupy the large arch of a portal that once led to a family loggia.

Among the architects who indulged in the creation and decoration of kneeling windows were Bartolomeo Ammannati and Bernardo Buontalenti.

== Bibliography ==
=== Italian sources ===
- AA.VV. Enciclopedia dell'Architettura, Garzanti, Milano 1996, ISBN 88-11-50465-1.
- Pevsner, Fleming e Honour, Dizionario di architettura, Utet, Torino 1978 ISBN 88-06-51961-1; ristampato come Dizionario dei termini artistici, Utet Tea, 1994
