= Casa Acciaiuoli =

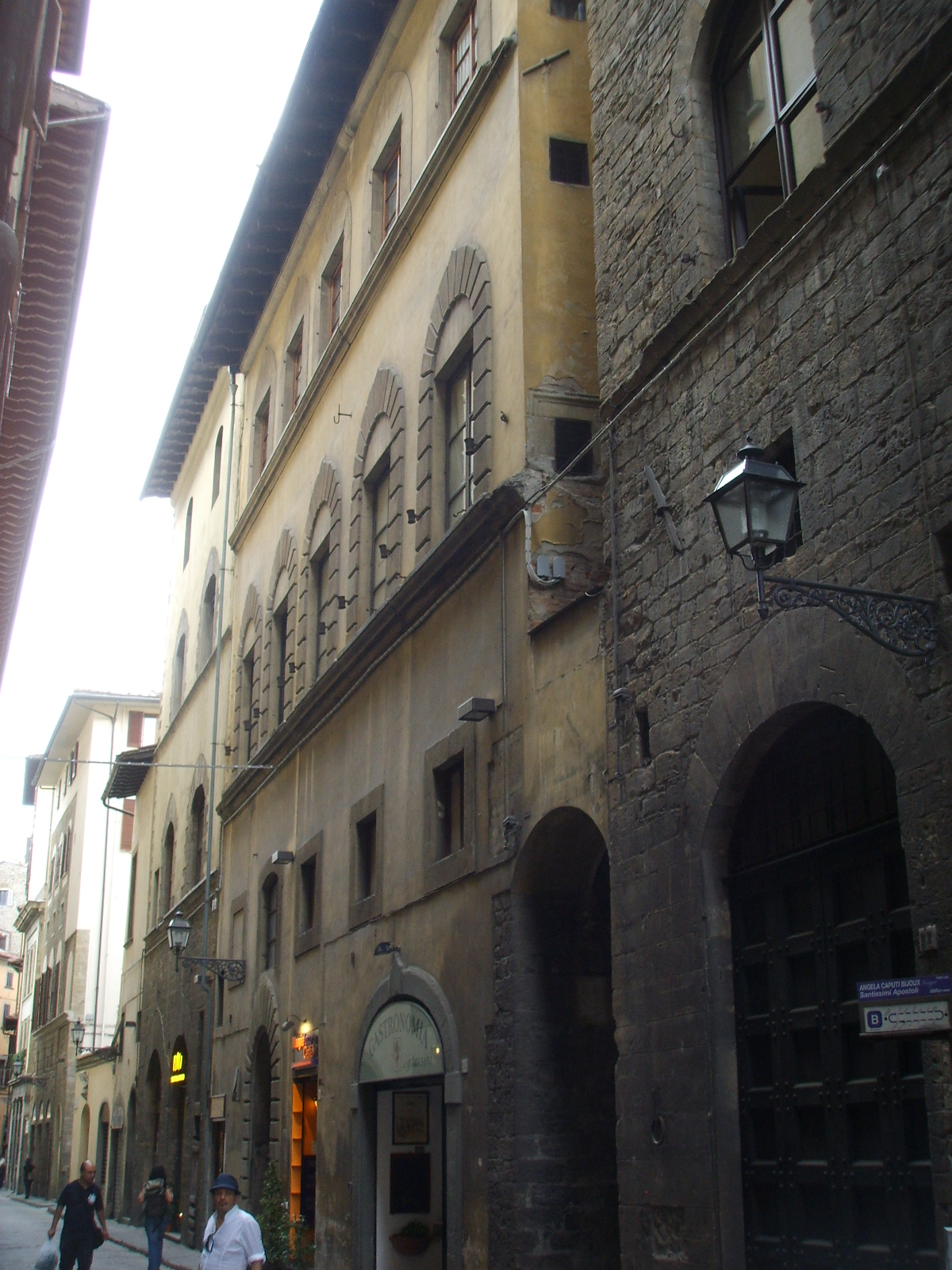
- Casa Acciaiuoli
- Interactive map of the Casa Acciaiuoli area

General information
- Status: In use
- Type: Palace
- Architectural style: Mannerist
- Location: Florence, Toscana, Italy, 10, via Borgo Santi Apostoli
- Coordinates: 43.769267°N 11.253022°E
- Construction started: 15th century
- Completed: 15th century

The Casa Acciaiuoli was one of the Acciaiuoli family's palaces in Florence, located at Borgo Santi Apostoli 10 corner Chiasso Cornino 1r.

== History and description ==
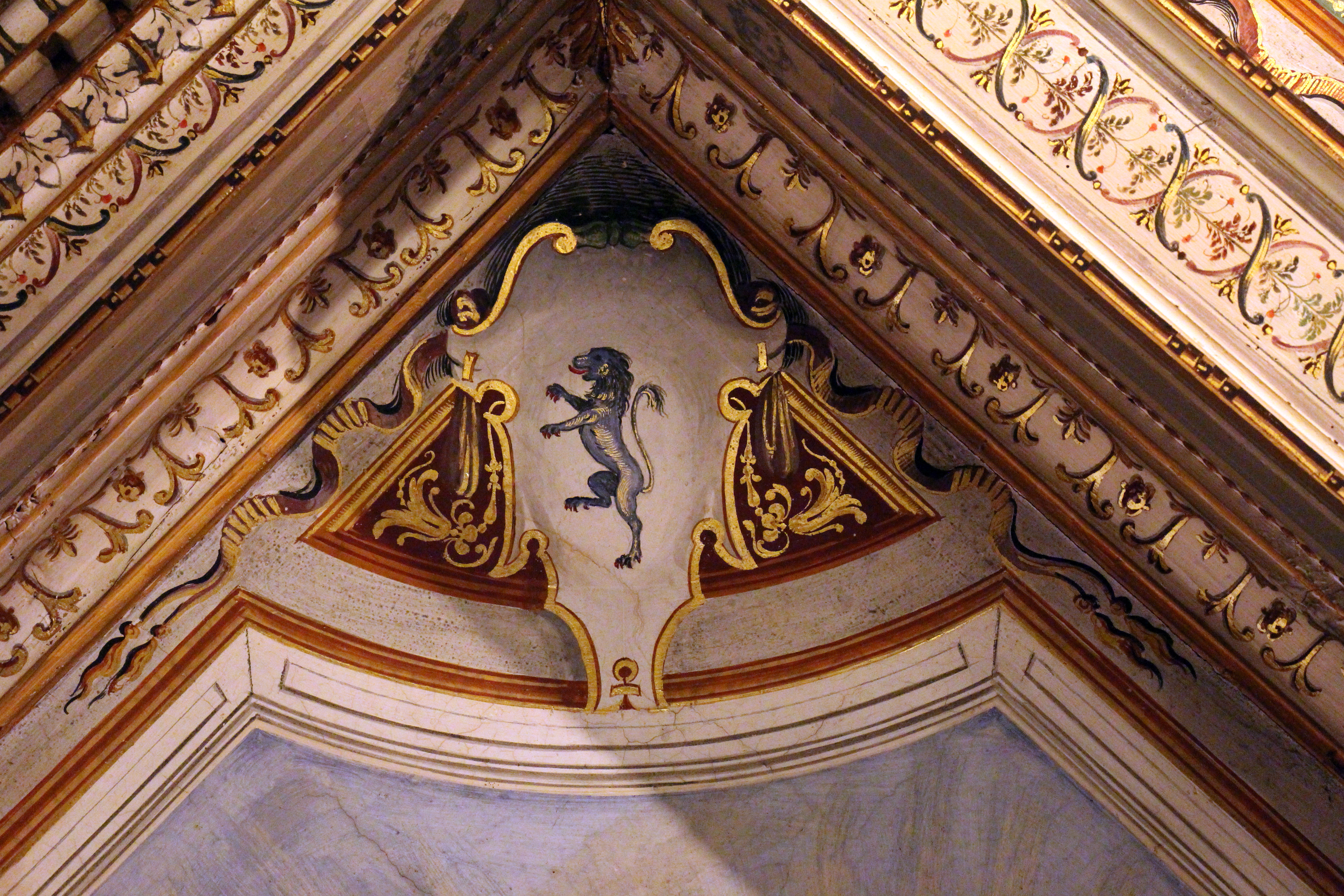
Night and Day Room, ceiling by Jacopo Vignali, 1625, Acciaiuoli coat of arms

This is a fifteenth-century house formerly belonging to the Acciaiuoli family (owned by the family until its extinction), bordering on a Bonciani palace on the corner of Via delle Terme, "which still retains the remains of its sturdy and severe construction". The wealthy banking family had its headquarters in this area of the city, as evidenced by the adjacent Palazzo Acciaiuoli and the Torre degli Acciaiuoli. The family's most important building no longer exists today: it was located on the opposite side of the street and had a beautiful façade on the Lungarno, but it was swept away by German mines in August 1944, which gutted the entrances to the Ponte Vecchio.

Casa Acciaiuoli has a typically 16th-century façade, with stone elements standing out against the background of light-coloured plaster. "From the very first years of the 16th century, the Acciaiuoli family had built their new palace in the borgo (today house number 10), according to those chastened late 15th-century dictates (two orders of centred windows, with flat projections, as around the portal; elegant marcadavanzale cornices; rectangular windows on the mezzanine). The front facing the Cornino chiasso retains some of the earlier projections".

The main front is developed over three floors on five axes. On the ground floor is an off-centre arched doorway, framed by bugne arranged in a radial pattern, flanked by later openings that today allow access to commercial buildings. Beyond the windows of the mezzanine, also profiled in stone, is a row of five windows with cornices similar to that of the doorway, joined by a billboard, partially filled in for a resizing of the openings. On the top floor, the windows, also on a marcadavanzale band, are without the relief frame and rectangular in shape.

== See also ==
- Casa Carlini

== Bibliography ==
=== Italian sources ===
- L’illustratore fiorentino. Calendario storico per l’anno ..., a cura di Guido Carocci, Firenze, Tipografia Domenicana, (1908) 1907, p. 153;
- Walther Limburger, Die Gebäude von Florenz: Architekten, Strassen und Plätze in alphabetischen Verzeichnissen, Lipsia, F.A. Brockhaus, 1910, n. 3;
- I Palazzi fiorentini. Quartiere di San Giovanni, introduzione di Piero Bargellini, schede dei palazzi di Marcello Jacorossi, Firenze, Comitato per l’Estetica Cittadina, 1972, p. 99, n. 182;
- Touring Club Italiano, Firenze e dintorni, Milano, Touring Editore, 1974, p. 289;
- Piero Bargellini, Ennio Guarnieri, Le strade di Firenze, 4 voll., Firenze, Bonechi, 1977–1978, I, 1977, p. 73;
- Giampaolo Trotta, Gli antichi chiassi tra Ponte Vecchio e Santa Trinita. Storia del rione dei Santi Apostoli, dai primi insediamenti romani alle costruzioni postbelliche, Firenze, Messaggerie Toscane, 1992, pp. 21, 37;
- Franco Cesati, Le strade di Firenze. Storia, aneddoti, arte, segreti e curiosità della città più affascinante del mondo attraverso 2400 vie, piazze e canti, 2 voll., Roma, Newton & Compton editori, 2005, II, p. 559.
- Gianluca Belli, Paramenti bugnati e architettura nella Firenze del Quattrocento, Firenze, University Press, 2019, p. 406, n. 1.
