= Palazzo Neroni =

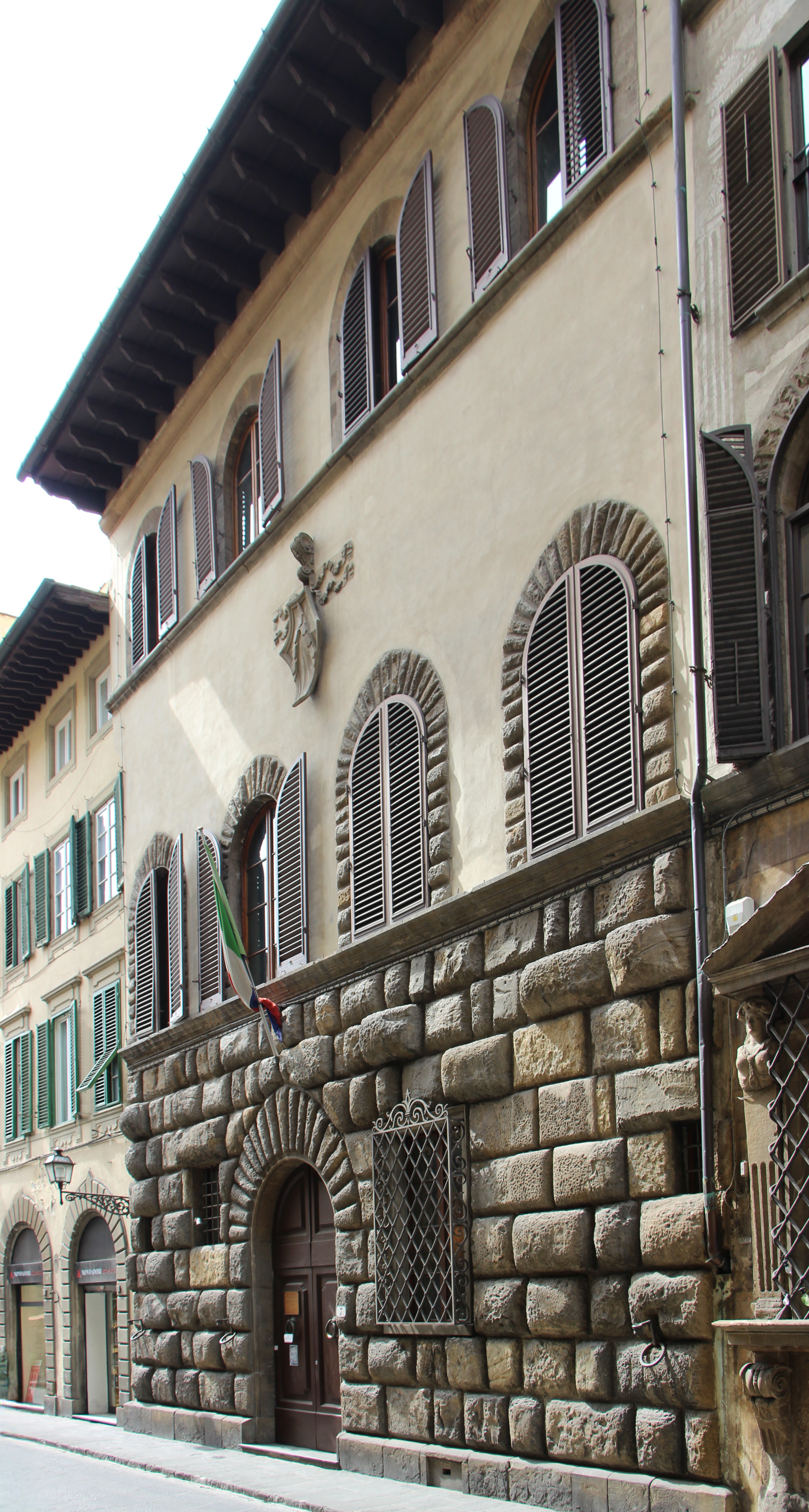
- Palazzo Neroni
- Interactive map of the Palazzo Neroni area

General information
- Status: In use
- Type: Palace
- Architectural style: Mannerist
- Location: Florence, Italy, 7, via de' Ginori
- Coordinates: 43.775439°N 11.255278°E
- Current tenants: Archival Superintendency for Tuscany
- Construction started: 1461 - 1466 гг.

Palazzo Neroni is a historic building in the centre of Florence, located at via de' Ginori 7, with a rear entrance also at via della Stufa 4r-6r.

The palazzo appears in the list compiled in 1901 by the General Directorate of Antiquities and Fine Arts, as a monumental building to be considered national artistic heritage (Italy).

== History ==
=== The 15th century ===
The palace, after having long been identified with the «casa per mio abitare» denounced to the cadastre by Diotisalvi Neroni in 1451 (which is instead to be indicated in the Palazzo Barbolani di Montauto, at number 9) has recently been traced back to a building promoted between 1461 and 1469 by the latter’s brother, Nigi.

Nigi Neroni, who already lived in a house in this location and purchased from the Da Sommaia family in 1447, had expanded the family’s property by adding to the initial nucleus further buildings purchased from the Della Stufa (1461), the Di Fruosino and finally the Sansalvi (1463), so that, by now in exile in Prato due to the misfortunes suffered by the family, he declared in 1469 that «of all the above-mentioned chases I have made the expenses of my dwelling that those numbers adding up I will have spent all my substance». The generation after Nero however, in particular by Diotisalvi Neroni, plotted against Piero de' Medici and suffered exile for this. The entire Neroni family was accused of complicity, including the archbishop Giovanni Neroni, and suffered the confiscation of property, including the adjoining building now known as Palazzo Barbolani di Montauto. Due to his marginal role, Nigi was nevertheless spared confiscation. For this reason, the palace remained to his descendants.

Prima di queste precisazioni, più di uno studioso aveva proposto una contemporaneità del cantiere con quello dell’antistante palazzo Medici, in virtù delle analogie tra il possente bugnato dei due edifici, e una conseguente attribuzione a Michelozzo, che tuttavia in questo edificio avrebbe offerto «un’architettura dignitosa ma per nulla originale, quasi fosse il replay di una lunga serie di forme architettoniche già sperimentate».

=== Subsequent changes ===
Passed to the Bracci family in 1564, the palace was enlarged in the 17th century towards Via della Stufa, with the construction of some rooms used as stables and sheds. At the end of the 18th century, the palace passed to the Roffia Morelli who, however, after a short time, sold it to the Albizzi (1816). The house thus became the home of Amerigo degli Albizzi, after interior embellishment work, both decorative and reconfiguration of some rooms, dating from 1819.

Further works and readjustments were promoted between 1864 and 1865, shortly before the property was sold to the Gatteschi family (1870) and then to the Donati (1893). In 1920, the palazzo was purchased by the Banca Immobiliare Italiana and in the same year sold to the Jewish Ottolenghi family, who restored the façade in the summer of 1922. Following the Ottolenghi’s forced flight to Palestine in the 1930s, the palazzo was leased to third parties and experienced a period of misuse and progressive decay.

In 1987 the palazzo was purchased by the Ministry of Cultural Heritage and Activities through the exercise of the right of pre-emption during a sale (as a listed building), and between 1989 and 1996 it was the subject of extensive restoration and adaptation work. The intervention, based on scrupulous research, on the one hand enhanced the elements that can be traced back to the 15th-century palazzo, and on the other recovered the more documented and preserved 19th-century spaces, especially the extensive decorations on the ground floor. Also as part of the building site, the minor loggia of the ground floor was discovered in 1991, completely concealed by thick masonry.

The palace is currently home to the Soprintendenza Archivistica for Tuscany.

== Description ==
The palace stands out among the others on the street for the thick rusticated ashlar that protrudes over the façade on the ground floor, giving it a particularly solid and imposing appearance. The front is organised on three floors by four axes, with the portal, framed by oriented ashlars, at the second axis. The windows are rectangular on the ground floor, of various sizes; on the upper floors they are centred, emphasised by string-course cornices on plaster. In the centre of the façade is the coat of arms of the Neroni family (here without enamels, on the vaio staircase), also present in the house on the left. At the bottom is a street bench.

Inside, with the exception of the courtyard loggia on one side, with two arches supported by a column and two half-columns with 15th-century capitals, the appearance is predominantly 19th-20th century, with some Art Nouveau-style decorations dating from the early decades of the 20th century.

== Bibliography ==
=== Italian sources ===
- Ministero della Pubblica Istruzione (Direzione Generale delle Antichità e Belle Arti), Elenco degli Edifizi Monumentali in Italia, Roma, Tipografia ditta Ludovico Cecchini, 1902, p. 255;
- Walther Limburger, Die Gebäude von Florenz: Architekten, Strassen und Plätze in alphabetischen Verzeichnissen, Lipsia, F.A. Brockhaus, 1910, n. 497;
- Augusto Garneri, Firenze e dintorni: in giro con un artista. Guida ricordo pratica storica critica, Torino et alt., Paravia & C., s.d. ma 1924, p. 185, n. XV;
- Walther Limburger, Le costruzioni di Firenze, traduzione, aggiornamenti bibliografici e storici a cura di Mazzino Fossi, Firenze, Soprintendenza ai Monumenti di Firenze, 1968 (dattiloscritto presso la Biblioteca della Soprintendenza per i Beni Architettonici e per il Paesaggio per le province di Firenze Pistoia e Prato, 4/166), n. 497;
- Touring Club Italiano, Firenze e dintorni, Milano, Touring Editore, 1974, p. 256;
- Piero Bargellini, Ennio Guarnieri, Le strade di Firenze, 4 voll., Firenze, Bonechi, 1977-1978, II, 1977, p. 43;
- Miranda Ferrara, Palazzi Neroni e Gerini, in Miranda Ferrara, Francesco Quinterio, Michelozzo di Bartolomeo, Firenze, Salimbeni, 1984, pp. 363-365;
- Marcello Vannucci, Splendidi palazzi di Firenze, Le Lettere, Firenze 1995 ISBN 887166230X
- Palazzo Neroni a Firenze. Storia, architettura, restauro, a cura di Paola Benigni, Firenze, Edifir, 1996;
- Pietro Ruschi, Conferme michelozziane per il palazzo di Dietisalvi Neroni a Firenze, in Michelozzo scultore e architetto (1396-1472), atti del convegno internazionale ADSI (Firenze, Palazzo Vecchio e Palazzo Gerini, 2-5 ottobre 1996) a cura di Gabriele Morolli, Firenze, Centro Di, 1998, pp. 215-230;
- Franco Cesati, Le strade di Firenze. Storia, aneddoti, arte, segreti e curiosità della città più affascinante del mondo attraverso 2400 vie, piazze e canti, 2 voll., Roma, Newton & Compton editori, 2005, I, p. 287;
- Touring Club Italiano, Firenze e provincia, Milano, Touring Editore, 2005, p. 288.
- Mugelli Costruzioni 1913-2013. Un secolo di cantieri e restauri edili, Firenze, Tipografia San Marco, 2013, pp. 145-146;
- Palazzo Neroni, Firenze, in Paolo Mazzoni. Restauro su restauro, a cura di Paola Maresca, Firenze, Angelo Pontecorboli Editore, Firenze, 2014, pp. 130-135;
- Gianluca Belli, Paramenti bugnati e architettura nella Firenze del Quattrocento, Firenze, University Press, 2019, p. 408, n. 29, fig. 17 (con rimandi al testo tramite l'indice analitico della pubblicazione).
