= Casa Carlini =

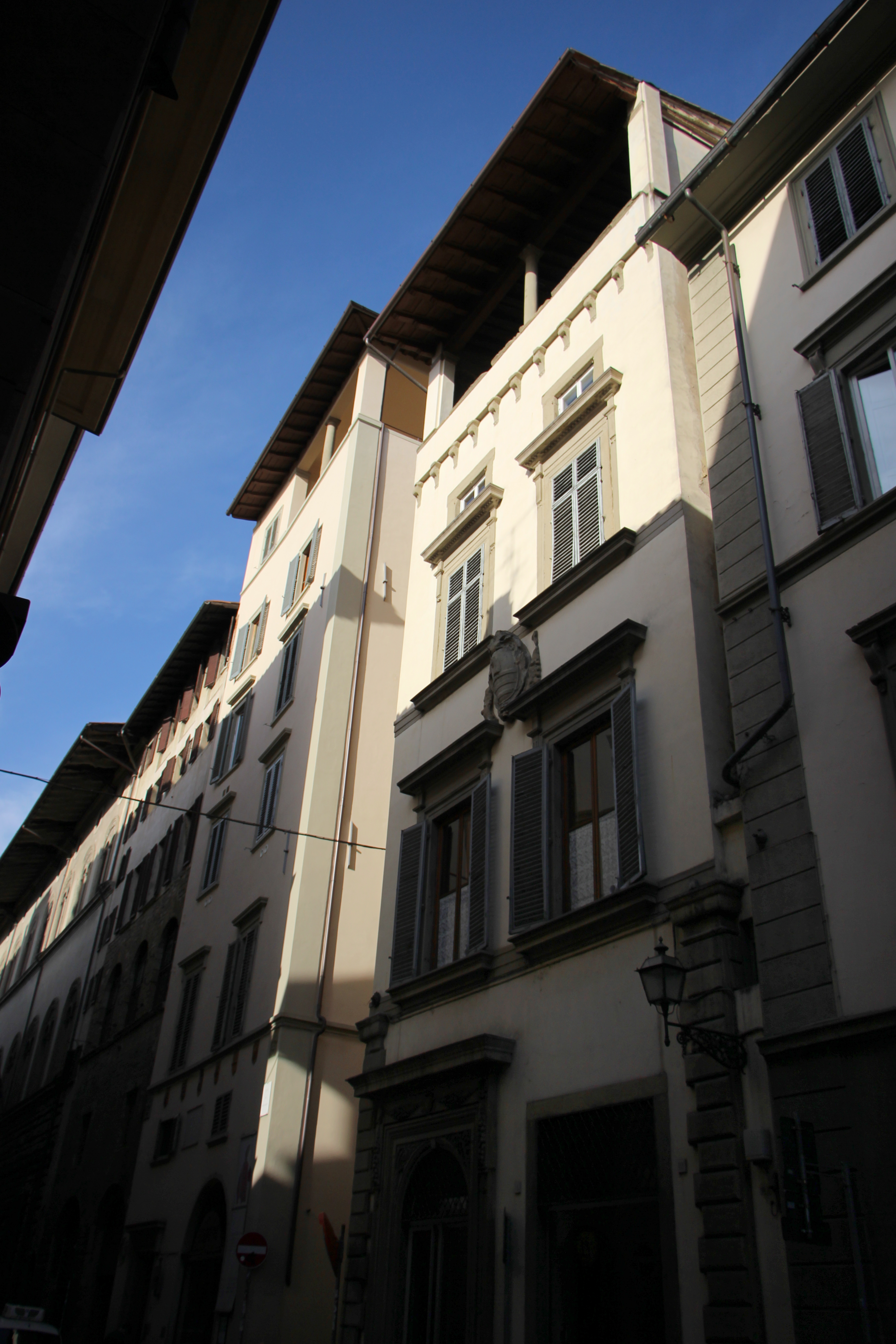
- Casa Carlini facade
- Interactive map of the Casa Carlini area
- Alternative names: palazzo Carlini

General information
- Status: In use
- Type: Palace
- Architectural style: Mannerist
- Location: Florence, Toscana, Italy, Via dei Pandolfini 33 angolo via del Proconsolo 12r-14r
- Coordinates: 43.770897°N 11.257977°E
- Construction started: supposedly founded in the XIV

Casa Carlini is a historical building in Florence, located in via de' Pandolfini 33 corner via del Proconsolo 12r-14r. It was the seat from 1497 of the stamperia Giunti.

The house appears (as Palazzo Carlini) in the list compiled in 1901 by the General Directorate of Antiquities and Fine Arts, as a monumental building to be considered national artistic heritage.

== History and description ==
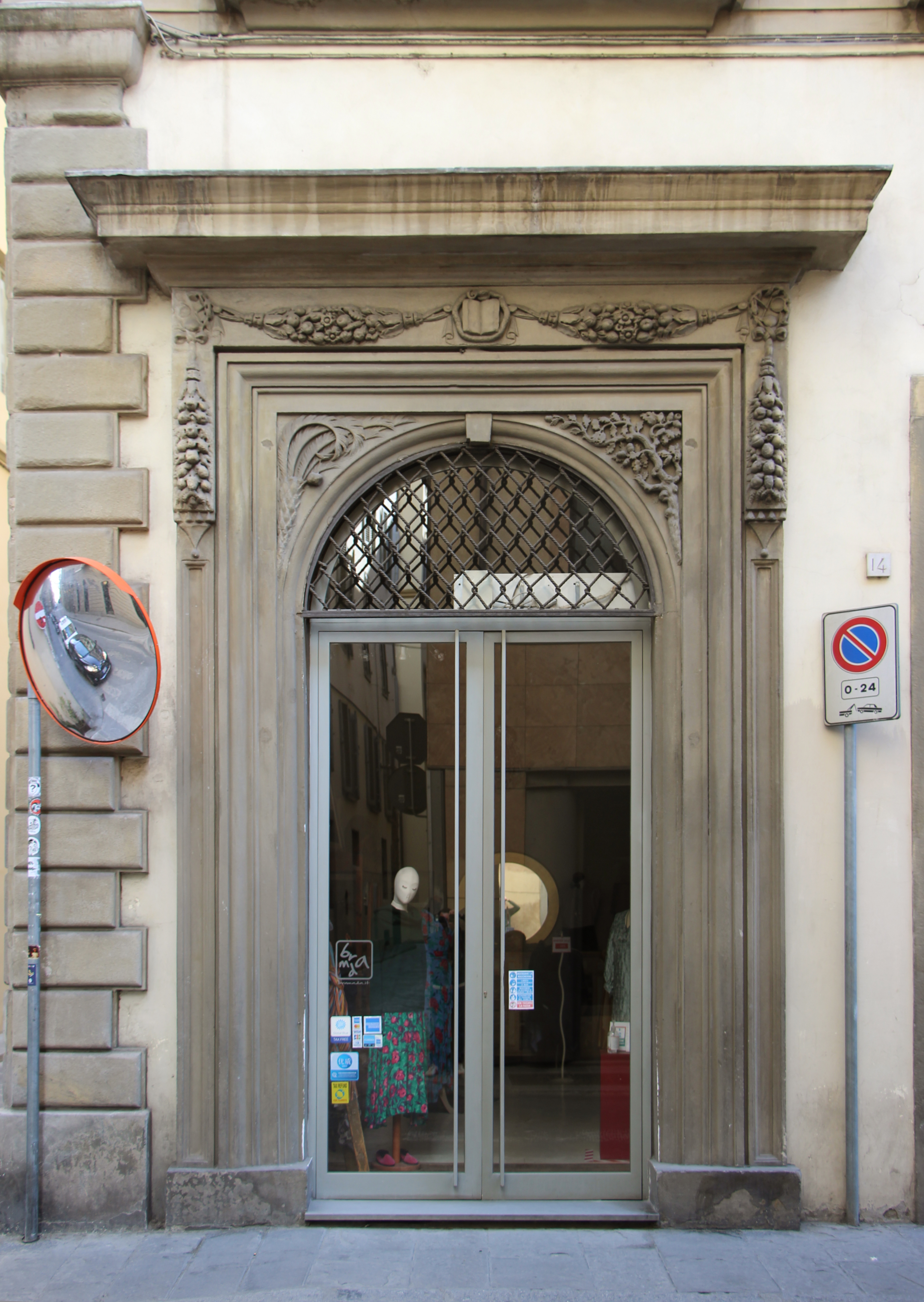
The portal

The house, presumably founded in the late 14th century and originally owned by the convent of the Badia, can be identified with that occupied from 1497 by the famous Giunti printing works, and today has a substantially 16th-century design front.

In the 17th and subsequent centuries it underwent significant alterations and, in any case, from the 19th century onwards, it was repeatedly noted for the very elegant sculpted stone decoration that formed the façade of the workshop. Thus, for example, Federico Fantozzi noted in his 1842 guidebook: «The beautiful door, the earthly window and the coat of arms that can be seen above the windows on the first floor deserve to be carefully observed for the beautiful festoons of flowers and fruit that were sculpted there with such diligence and love, that instead of stone they seem real and natural».

In 1884, given the deplorable state of the building, restoration work was carried out that once again led scholars to take an interest in the relief: «the door, especially, adorned with superbly sculpted foliage and fruit, is a real jewel. Perhaps it is designed by that fertile and bizarre artist who was Giovanni da San Giovanni, who worked a lot for Carlini».

The coat of arms still exists, although it is definitely abraded, and can be traced back to the Carlini family, already mentioned as the long-time owner of the building (banded with six pieces of black and silver, with the head of the second charged with a natural cat's head). The workshop's decoration of leaves and fruit is also visible, but mortified by paint, in turn covering the sketchy additions made during the 1884 intervention.

Of particular note, however, is the airy altana crowning the building and making it absolutely remarkable in the context of the street.

It is emphasised how some literature hypothesises that in this house, in the 15th century, the stationer Vespasiano da Bisticci had his workshop (other texts locate it near the canto dei Cartolai).

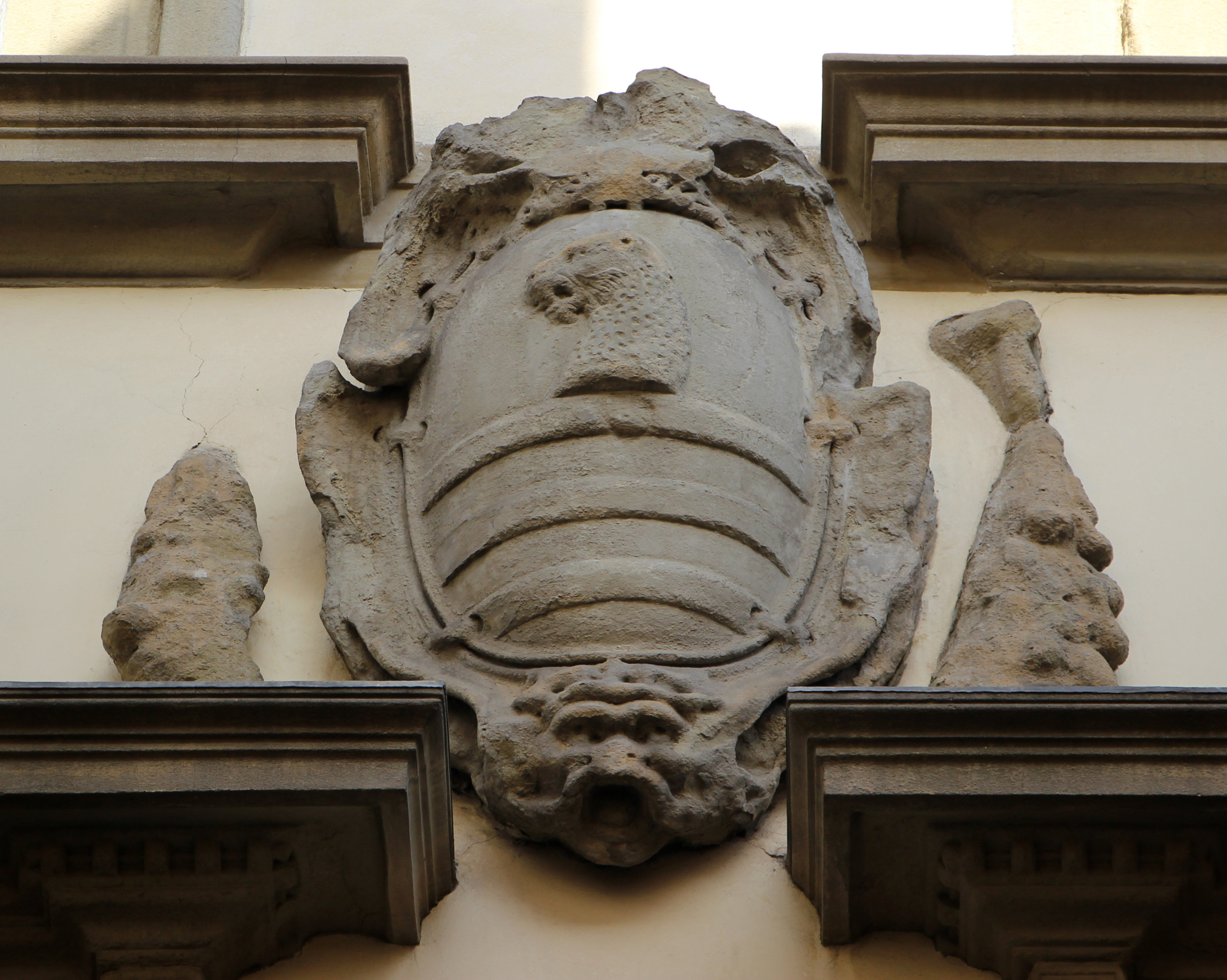
The carlini coat of arms

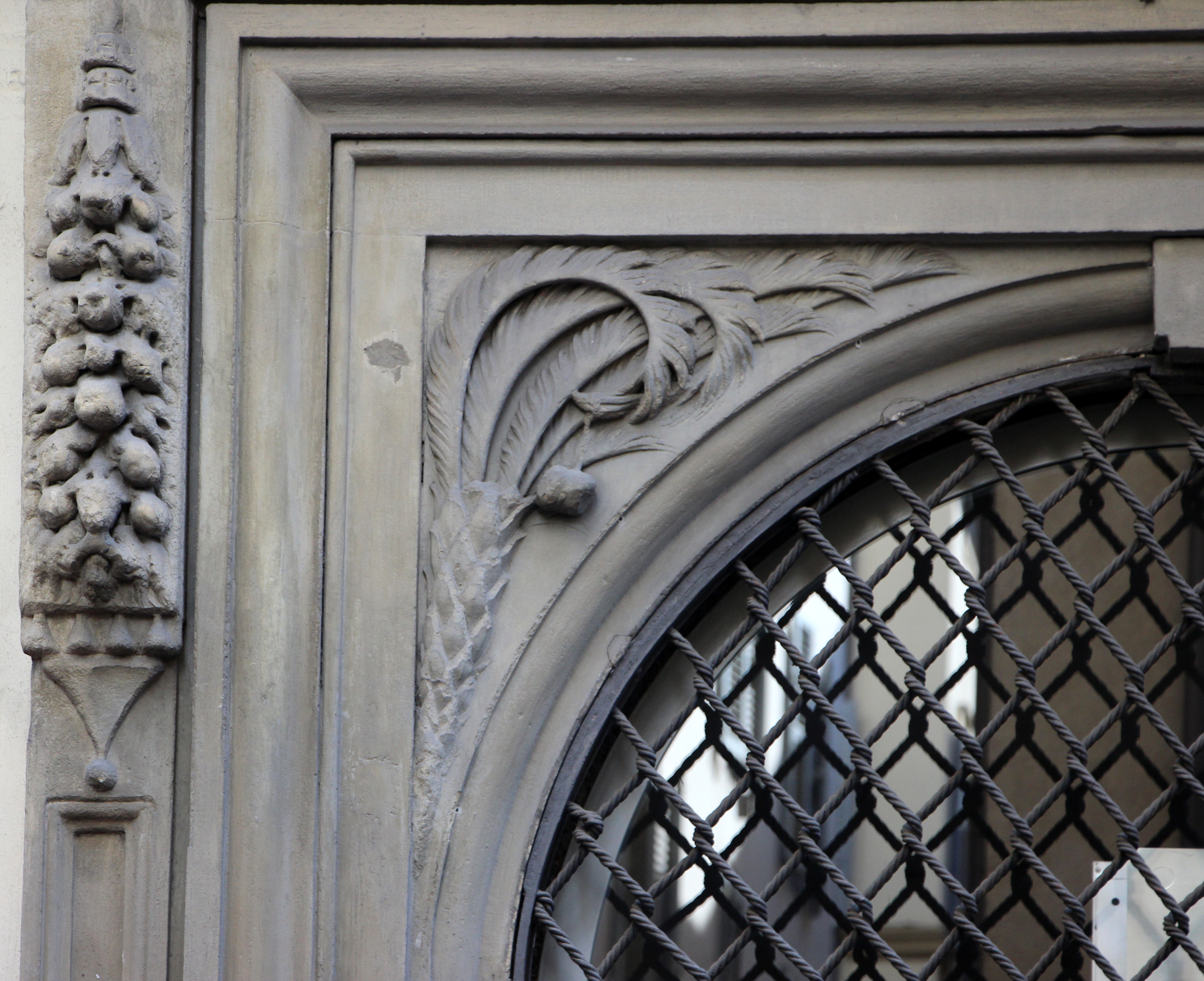
Detail of the portal: palm

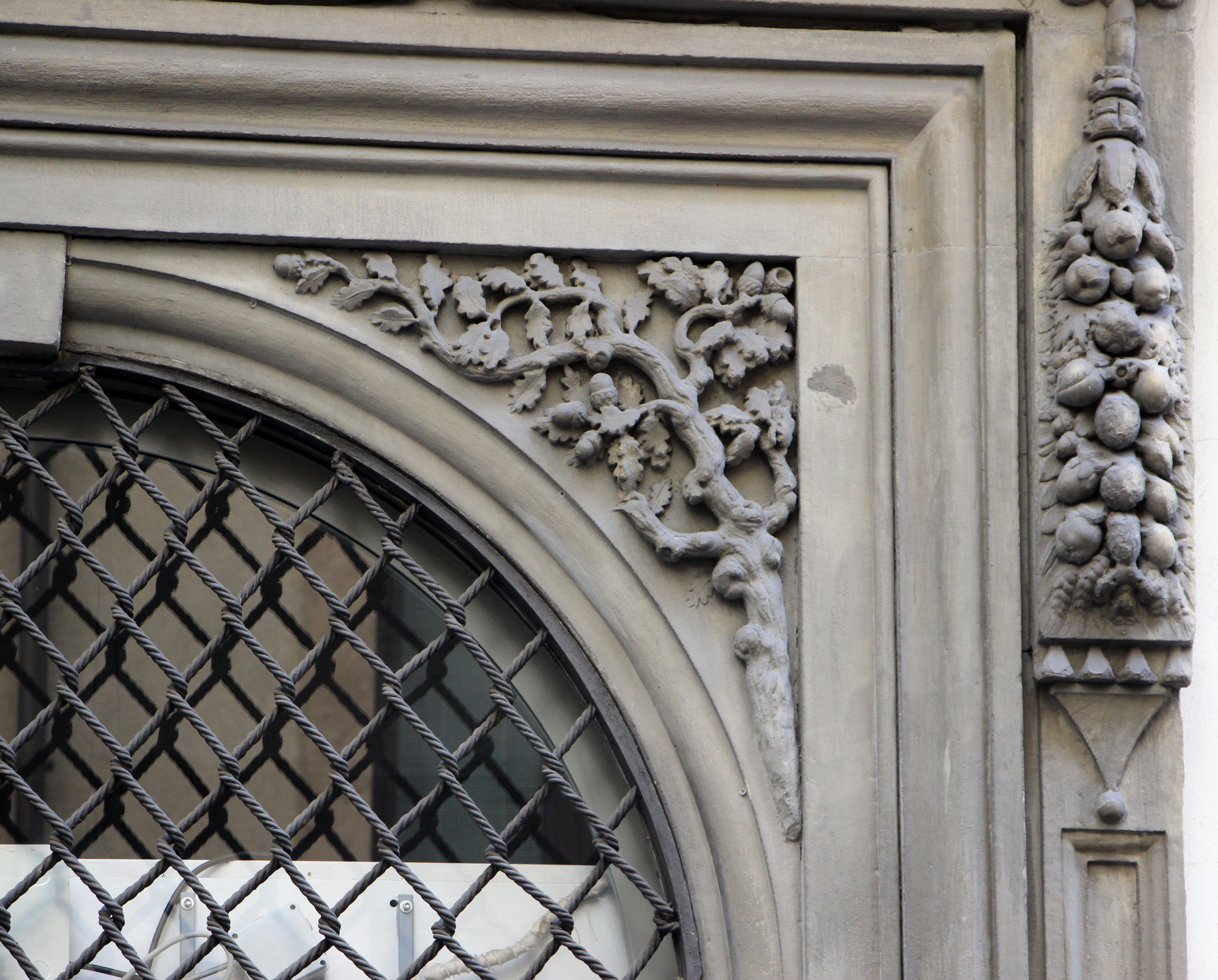
Detail of portal: oak

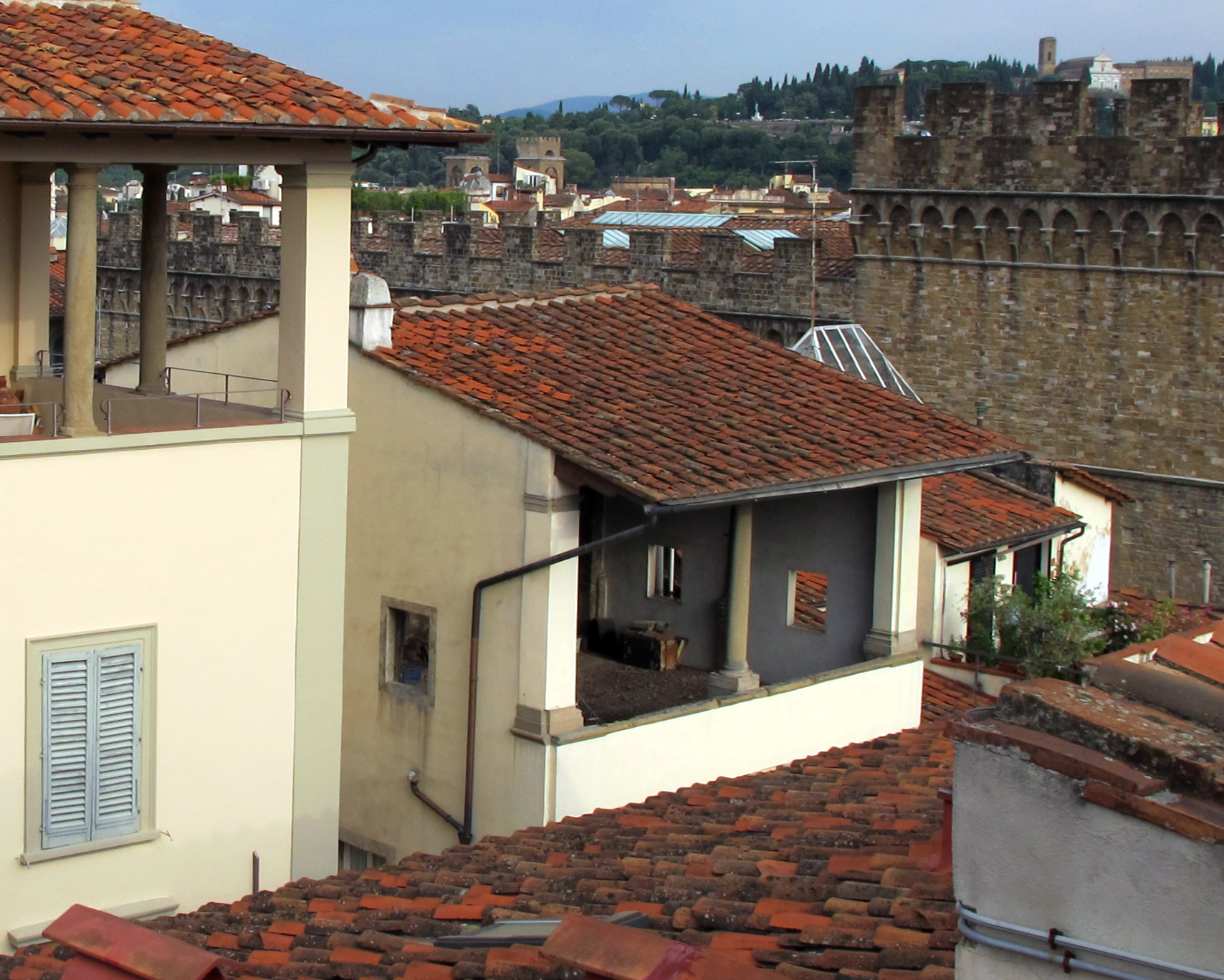
the loggia on the top floor

== See also ==
- Palazzo Adorni

== Sources ==
=== Italian sources ===
- Federico Fantozzi, Nuova guida ovvero descrizione storico artistico critica della città e contorni di Firenze, Firenze, Giuseppe e fratelli Ducci, 1842, p. 259, n. 48;
- Federico Fantozzi, Pianta geometrica della città di Firenze alla proporzione di 1 a 4500 levata dal vero e corredata di storiche annotazioni, Firenze, Galileiana, 1843, p. 132, n. 297;
- Nuova guida della città di Firenze ossia descrizione di tutte le cose che vi si trovano degne d’osservazione, con piante e vedute, ultima edizione compilata da Giuseppe François, Firenze, Vincenzo Bulli, 1850, p. 195;
- Restauri da sorvegliarsi, in "Arte e Storia", III, 1884, 15, p. 119;
- Cose edilizie in "Arte e Storia", III, 1884, 18, pp. 142–143;
- Restauri, in "Arte e Storia", III, 1884, 22, p. 175;
- Cose fiorentine d'arte e storia, in "Arte e Storia", XXI, 1902, 13, p. 90.
- Ministero della Pubblica Istruzione (Direzione Generale delle Antichità e Belle Arti), Elenco degli Edifizi Monumentali in Italia, Roma, Tipografia ditta Ludovico Cecchini, 1902, p. 253;
- L’illustratore fiorentino. Calendario storico per l’anno ..., a cura di Guido Carocci, Firenze, Tipografia Domenicana, (1905) 1904, pp. 27–28;
- Walther Limburger, Die Gebäude von Florenz: Architekten, Strassen und Plätze in alphabetischen Verzeichnissen, Lipsia, F.A. Brockhaus, 1910, n. 328;
- Piero Bargellini, Ennio Guarnieri, Le strade di Firenze, 4 voll., Firenze, Bonechi, 1977–1978, III, 1978, pp. 28, 190;
- Claudio Paolini, Case e palazzi nel quartiere di Santa Croce a Firenze, Firenze, Paideia, 2008, pp. 173–174, n. 265;
- Claudio Paolini, Architetture fiorentine. Case e palazzi nel quartiere di Santa Croce, Firenze, Paideia, 2009, pp. 249–250, n. 354.
