= Martelli =

Martelli or Martelly is a surname which may refer to:

- Adrienne Martelli (born 1987), American rower
- Alessandro Martelli (1876–1934), Italian academic and politician
- Alex Martelli (born 1955), Italian computer engineer
- Augusto Martelli (1940–2014), Italian composer, conductor, arranger and television personality
- Carlo Martelli (born 1935), English composer
- Carlo Martelli (politician) (born 1966), Italian senator
- Claudio Martelli (born 1943), Italian politician
- Danilo Martelli (1927–1949), Italian footballer
- Diego Martelli (1839–1896), Italian art critic
- Esmond Martelli (1878–1926), Irish rugby union player
- Francesco Martelli (1633–1717), Italian Roman Catholic cardinal
- Giuseppe Maria Martelli (1678–1741), Italian Roman Catholic archbishop of Florence
- Henri Martelli (1895–1980), French composer
- Sir Horace Martelli (1877–1959), British Army officer
- John de Martelly (1903–1979), American lithographer, etcher, painter, illustrator
- Manuela Martelli (born 1983), Chilean film and television actress
- Marzio Martelli (born 1971), Italian former professional tennis player
- Michel Martelly (born 1961), Haitian musician and politician; President of Haiti from 2011 to 2016
- Otello Martelli (1902–2000), Italian cinematographer
- Phil Martelli (born 1954), American basketball coach
- Raffaele Martelli (1811–1880), Italian priest and Canon
- Sabato Martelli Castaldi (1896–1944), Italian Air Force general
- Sebastián Martelli (born 1996), Argentine footballer
- Ugolino Martelli (bishop) (died 1523), Roman Catholic prelate, Bishop of Narni and Lecce
- Ugolino Martelli (1860–1934), Italian biologist
- Vera Martelli (1930–2017), Italian sprinter

== See also ==
- 4061 Martelli
- Villa Martelli
