= Catena =

Catena (Latin for chain) or catenae (plural) may refer to:

== Science ==
- Catena (fly), a genus in the family Tachinidae
- Catena (linguistics) is a unit of syntax and morphology, closely associated with dependency grammars
- Catena (computing), number of bits transferred in one cycle, in the jargon of some historic machines
- Catenary, a type of curve in mathematics
- Crater chain, a line of craters along the surface of an astronomical body
- Farmacia Catena, a trade name of the drug idebenone
- Catena (soil) in pedology, a sequence of soil profiles down a slope
- Catena (cryptography), a cryptographic algorithm used as a key derivation function

== Publishing ==
- Catena (soil science journal), published by Elsevier
- Catena Paperback, published by E. Schweizerbart
- Catena Supplements, published by E. Schweizerbart
- CATENA: Magazine of the Catenian Association
- Catena Media, an online media company in Malta

== Religion ==
- Catena (biblical commentary), a verse-by-verse biblical commentary
- a prayer said daily by members of the Legion of Mary

== Other uses ==
- Catena (surname)
- Catena, San Miniato, a village in the province of Pisa, Italy
- International Masonic Union Catena, a masonic organization
- A term for the bass bar
