= 2023 Arnold Clark Cup squads =

List of players competing at the 2nd edition of the Arnold Clark Cup

This article lists the squads for the 2023 Arnold Clark Cup, the second edition of the Arnold Clark Cup. The cup consisted of a series of friendly games, and were held in England from 16 to 22 February 2023. The four national teams involved in the tournament could register a maximum of 26 players.

The age listed for each player is on 16 February 2023, the first day of the tournament. The numbers of caps and goals listed for each player do not include any matches played after the start of tournament. The club listed is the club for which the player last played a competitive match prior to the tournament. The nationality for each club reflects the national association (not the league) to which the club is affiliated. A flag is included for coaches that are of a different nationality than their own national team.

== Squads ==
=== Belgium ===
Coach: Ives Serneels

The final 26-player squad was announced on 6 February 2023.

| No. | Pos. | Player | Date of birth (age) | Caps | Goals | Club |
|---|---|---|---|---|---|---|
| 1 | GK | Nicky Evrard | 26 May 1995 (aged 27) | 59 | 0 | (Royal Belgian Football Association) OH Leuven |
| 2 | DF | Davina Philtjens | 26 February 1989 (aged 33) | 115 | 10 | (Italian Football Federation) Sassuolo |
| 3 | FW | Ella Van Kerkhoven | 20 November 1993 (aged 29) | 23 | 13 | (Royal Belgian Football Association) OH Leuven |
| 4 | DF | Michelle Colson | 19 September 1998 (aged 24) | 0 | 0 | (Royal Belgian Football Association) Anderlecht |
| 5 | DF | Sarah Wijnants | 13 October 1999 (aged 23) | 26 | 2 | (Royal Belgian Football Association) Anderlecht |
| 6 | FW | Tine De Caigny | 9 June 1997 (aged 25) | 81 | 39 | (German Football Association) 1899 Hoffenheim |
| 7 | FW | Hannah Eurlings | 1 January 2003 (aged 20) | 24 | 6 | (Royal Belgian Football Association) OH Leuven |
| 8 | MF | Féli Delacauw | 4 April 2002 (aged 20) | 13 | 0 | (Royal Dutch Football Association) Fortuna Sittard |
| 9 | FW | Tessa Wullaert | 19 March 1993 (aged 29) | 117 | 71 | (Royal Dutch Football Association) Fortuna Sittard |
| 10 | MF | Justine Vanhaevermaet | 29 April 1992 (aged 30) | 42 | 6 | (The Football Association) Reading |
| 11 | DF | Janice Cayman | 12 October 1988 (aged 34) | 132 | 48 | (French Football Federation) Lyon |
| 12 | GK | Diede Lemey | 7 October 1996 (aged 26) | 7 | 0 | (Royal Dutch Football Association) Fortuna Sittard |
| 13 | FW | Elena Dhont | 27 March 1998 (aged 24) | 30 | 3 | (Royal Dutch Football Association) FC Twente |
| 14 | FW | Jassina Blom | 3 September 1994 (aged 28) | 20 | 8 | (Royal Spanish Football Federation) UDG Tenerife |
| 15 | DF | Jody Vangheluwe | 15 July 1997 (aged 25) | 14 | 0 | (Royal Belgian Football Association) Club YLA |
| 16 | MF | Marie Detruyer | 13 January 2004 (aged 19) | 2 | 0 | (Royal Belgian Football Association) OH Leuven |
| 17 | FW | Jill Janssens | 3 October 2003 (aged 19) | 11 | 0 | (Royal Belgian Football Association) OH Leuven |
| 18 | DF | Laura De Neve | 9 October 1994 (aged 28) | 59 | 2 | (Royal Belgian Football Association) Anderlecht |
| 19 | DF | Sari Kees | 17 February 2001 (aged 21) | 15 | 2 | (Royal Belgian Football Association) OH Leuven |
| 20 | MF | Julie Biesmans | 4 May 1994 (aged 28) | 100 | 3 | (Royal Dutch Football Association) PSV |
| 21 | GK | Femke Bastiaen | 11 April 2001 (aged 21) | 0 | 0 | (Royal Dutch Football Association) PSV |
| 22 | DF | Laura Deloose | 18 June 1993 (aged 29) | 74 | 4 | (Royal Belgian Football Association) Anderlecht |
| 23 | MF | Kassandra Missipo | 3 February 1998 (aged 25) | 45 | 0 | (Swiss Football Association) Basel |
| 24 | DF | Fran Meersman | 15 October 2002 (aged 20) | 2 | 0 | (Royal Belgian Football Association) Gent |
| 25 | FW | Welma Fon | 1 June 2002 (aged 20) | 0 | 0 | (Royal Belgian Football Association) Standard Liège |
| 26 | MF | Valesca Ampoorter | 5 March 2004 (aged 18) | 0 | 0 | (Royal Belgian Football Association) OH Leuven |

=== England ===
Coach: (Netherlands) Sarina Wiegman

The final 26-player squad was announced on 7 February 2023. Fran Kirby withdrew from the squad due to injury on 11 February and was replaced with Jordan Nobbs.

| No. | Pos. | Player | Date of birth (age) | Caps | Goals | Club |
|---|---|---|---|---|---|---|
| 1 | GK | Mary Earps | 7 March 1993 (aged 29) | 29 | 0 | (The Football Association) Manchester United |
| 2 | DF | Lucy Bronze | 28 October 1991 (aged 31) | 100 | 11 | (Royal Spanish Football Federation) Barcelona |
| 3 | DF | Alex Greenwood | 7 September 1993 (aged 29) | 71 | 5 | (The Football Association) Manchester City |
| 4 | MF | Keira Walsh | 8 April 1997 (aged 25) | 54 | 0 | (Royal Spanish Football Federation) Barcelona |
| 5 | DF | Millie Bright | 21 August 1993 (aged 29) | 63 | 5 | (The Football Association) Chelsea |
| 6 | DF | Leah Williamson | 29 March 1997 (aged 25) | 39 | 2 | (The Football Association) Arsenal |
| 7 | FW | Chloe Kelly | 15 January 1998 (aged 25) | 20 | 3 | (The Football Association) Manchester City |
| 8 | MF | Georgia Stanway | 3 January 1999 (aged 24) | 45 | 14 | (German Football Association) Bayern Munich |
| 9 | FW | Alessia Russo | 8 February 1999 (aged 24) | 17 | 10 | (The Football Association) Manchester United |
| 10 | MF | Ella Toone | 2 September 1999 (aged 23) | 27 | 15 | (The Football Association) Manchester United |
| 11 | FW | Lauren Hemp | 7 August 2000 (aged 22) | 32 | 10 | (The Football Association) Manchester City |
| 12 | DF | Rachel Daly | 6 December 1991 (aged 31) | 63 | 11 | (The Football Association) Aston Villa |
| 13 | GK | Ellie Roebuck | 23 September 1999 (aged 23) | 10 | 0 | (The Football Association) Manchester City |
| 14 | MF | Jess Park | 21 October 2001 (aged 21) | 1 | 1 | (The Football Association) Everton |
| 15 | DF | Jess Carter | 27 October 1997 (aged 25) | 12 | 1 | (The Football Association) Chelsea |
| 16 | FW | Lauren James | 29 September 2001 (aged 21) | 5 | 0 | (The Football Association) Chelsea |
| 17 | FW | Ebony Salmon | 27 January 2001 (aged 22) | 3 | 0 | (United States Soccer Federation) Houston Dash |
| 18 | MF | Katie Zelem | 20 January 1996 (aged 27) | 5 | 0 | (The Football Association) Manchester United |
| 19 | DF | Niamh Charles | 21 June 1999 (aged 23) | 4 | 0 | (The Football Association) Chelsea |
| 20 | FW | Katie Robinson | 8 August 2002 (aged 20) | 1 | 0 | (The Football Association) Brighton & Hove Albion |
| 21 | GK | Sandy MacIver | 18 June 1998 (aged 24) | 1 | 0 | (The Football Association) Manchester City |
| 22 | DF | Lotte Wubben-Moy | 11 January 1999 (aged 24) | 8 | 0 | (The Football Association) Arsenal |
| 23 | DF | Maya Le Tissier | 18 April 2002 (aged 20) | 1 | 0 | (The Football Association) Manchester United |
| 24 | MF | Jordan Nobbs | 8 December 1992 (aged 30) | 69 | 8 | (The Football Association) Aston Villa |
| 25 | MF | Laura Coombs | 29 January 1991 (aged 32) | 2 | 0 | (The Football Association) Manchester City |
| 26 | GK | Emily Ramsey | 16 November 2000 (aged 22) | 0 | 0 | (The Football Association) Everton |

=== Italy ===
Coach: Milena Bertolini

The final 26-player squad was announced on 8 February 2023. Marta Mascarello withdrew due to injury on 10 February and was replaced with Aurora Galli.

| No. | Pos. | Player | Date of birth (age) | Caps | Goals | Club |
|---|---|---|---|---|---|---|
| 1 | GK | Laura Giuliani | 5 June 1993 (aged 29) | 65 | 0 | (Italian Football Federation) Milan |
| 2 | DF | Valentina Bergamaschi | 22 January 1997 (aged 26) | 40 | 6 | (Italian Football Federation) Milan |
| 3 | DF | Maria Luisa Filangeri | 28 January 2000 (aged 23) | 7 | 0 | (Italian Football Federation) Sassuolo |
| 4 | MF | Aurora Galli | 13 December 1996 (aged 26) | 51 | 7 | (The Football Association) Everton |
| 5 | DF | Elena Linari | 15 April 1994 (aged 28) | 66 | 4 | (Italian Football Federation) Roma |
| 6 | MF | Manuela Giugliano | 18 August 1997 (aged 25) | 54 | 5 | (Italian Football Federation) Roma |
| 7 | FW | Sofia Cantore | 30 September 1999 (aged 23) | 10 | 0 | (Italian Football Federation) Juventus |
| 8 | MF | Martina Rosucci | 9 May 1992 (aged 30) | 61 | 4 | (Italian Football Federation) Juventus |
| 9 | FW | Valentina Giacinti | 2 January 1994 (aged 29) | 46 | 20 | (Italian Football Federation) Roma |
| 10 | FW | Cristiana Girelli | 23 April 1990 (aged 32) | 74 | 43 | (Italian Football Federation) Juventus |
| 11 | FW | Barbara Bonansea | 13 June 1991 (aged 31) | 67 | 25 | (Italian Football Federation) Juventus |
| 12 | GK | Katja Schroffenegger | 28 April 1991 (aged 31) | 8 | 0 | (Italian Football Federation) Fiorentina |
| 13 | DF | Federica Cafferata | 7 May 2000 (aged 22) | 2 | 0 | (Italian Football Federation) Fiorentina |
| 14 | FW | Agnese Bonfantini | 4 July 1999 (aged 23) | 10 | 1 | (Italian Football Federation) Sampdoria |
| 15 | FW | Annamaria Serturini | 13 May 1998 (aged 24) | 19 | 1 | (Italian Football Federation) Roma |
| 16 | FW | Elisa Polli | 27 August 2000 (aged 22) | 3 | 0 | (Italian Football Federation) Inter Milan |
| 17 | DF | Lisa Boattin | 3 May 1997 (aged 25) | 39 | 1 | (Italian Football Federation) Juventus |
| 18 | MF | Arianna Caruso | 6 November 1999 (aged 23) | 28 | 10 | (Italian Football Federation) Juventus |
| 19 | DF | Martina Lenzini | 23 July 1998 (aged 24) | 15 | 0 | (Italian Football Federation) Juventus |
| 20 | FW | Martina Piemonte | 7 November 1997 (aged 25) | 7 | 1 | (Italian Football Federation) Milan |
| 21 | MF | Giada Greggi | 18 February 2000 (aged 22) | 6 | 1 | (Italian Football Federation) Roma |
| 22 | GK | Rachele Baldi | 2 October 1994 (aged 28) | 0 | 0 | (Italian Football Federation) Fiorentina |
| 23 | DF | Cecilia Salvai | 2 December 1993 (aged 29) | 37 | 2 | (Italian Football Federation) Juventus |
| 24 | FW | Michela Catena | 17 December 1999 (aged 23) | 0 | 0 | (Italian Football Federation) Fiorentina |
| 25 | DF | Benedetta Orsi | 25 February 2000 (aged 22) | 3 | 0 | (Italian Football Federation) Sassuolo |
| 26 | MF | Emma Severini | 18 July 2003 (aged 19) | 0 | 0 | (Italian Football Federation) Fiorentina |

=== South Korea ===
Coach: (England) Colin Bell

The final 26-player squad was announced on 26 January 2023.

| No. | Pos. | Player | Date of birth (age) | Caps | Goals | Club |
|---|---|---|---|---|---|---|
| 1 | GK | Yoon Young-geul | 28 October 1987 (aged 35) | 26 | 0 | Unattached |
| 2 | DF | Choo Hyo-joo | 7 September 1993 (aged 29) | 23 | 1 | (Korea Football Association) Suwon |
| 3 | DF | Hong Hye-ji | 25 August 1996 (aged 26) | 35 | 1 | (Korea Football Association) Hyundai Steel Red Angels |
| 4 | DF | Shim Seo-yeon | 15 April 1989 (aged 33) | 73 | 0 | (Korea Football Association) Seoul City |
| 5 | DF | Kim Hye-yeong | 26 February 1995 (aged 27) | 7 | 1 | (Korea Football Association) Gyeongju KHNP |
| 6 | DF | Lim Seon-joo | 27 November 1990 (aged 32) | 99 | 6 | (Korea Football Association) Hyundai Steel Red Angels |
| 7 | FW | Son Hwa-yeon | 15 March 1997 (aged 25) | 43 | 8 | (Korea Football Association) Hyundai Steel Red Angels |
| 8 | MF | Kim Yun-ji | 1 June 1989 (aged 33) | 2 | 0 | (Korea Football Association) Suwon |
| 9 | FW | Park Eun-sun | 25 December 1986 (aged 36) | 38 | 17 | (Korea Football Association) Seoul City |
| 10 | MF | Ji So-yun | 21 February 1991 (aged 31) | 141 | 65 | (Korea Football Association) Suwon |
| 11 | FW | Choe Yu-ri | 16 September 1994 (aged 28) | 47 | 9 | (Korea Football Association) Hyundai Steel Red Angels |
| 12 | FW | Kang Chae-rim | 23 March 1998 (aged 24) | 21 | 6 | (Korea Football Association) Hyundai Steel Red Angels |
| 13 | MF | Lee Geum-min | 7 April 1994 (aged 28) | 75 | 20 | (The Football Association) Brighton & Hove Albion |
| 14 | MF | Jang Chang | 21 June 1996 (aged 26) | 21 | 0 | (Korea Football Association) Hyundai Steel Red Angels |
| 15 | MF | Park Ye-eun | 17 October 1996 (aged 26) | 16 | 4 | (The Football Association) Brighton & Hove Albion |
| 16 | DF | Jang Sel-gi | 29 July 2000 (aged 22) | 84 | 12 | (Korea Football Association) Hyundai Steel Red Angels |
| 17 | FW | Jang Yu-been | 10 February 2002 (aged 21) | 0 | 0 | (Korea Football Association) Seoul City |
| 18 | GK | Kim Jung-mi | 16 October 1984 (aged 38) | 131 | 0 | (Korea Football Association) Hyundai Steel Red Angels |
| 19 | FW | Lee Jung-min | 23 November 1999 (aged 23) | 5 | 0 | (Korea Football Association) Boeun Sangmu |
| 20 | DF | Kim Hye-ri | 25 June 1990 (aged 32) | 106 | 1 | (Korea Football Association) Hyundai Steel Red Angels |
| 21 | GK | Ryu Ji-soo | 3 September 1997 (aged 25) | 0 | 0 | (Korea Football Association) Seoul City |
| 22 | FW | Ko Min-jung | 14 May 2001 (aged 21) | 0 | 0 | (Korea Football Association) Changnyeong |
| 23 | FW | Lee Eun-young | 31 March 2002 (aged 20) | 0 | 0 | (Korea Football Association) Korea University |
| 24 | MF | Bae Ye-bin | 7 December 2004 (aged 18) | 0 | 0 | (Korea Football Association) Pohang Girls' High School |
| 25 | MF | Chun Ga-ram | 19 October 2002 (aged 20) | 1 | 0 | (Korea Football Association) University of Ulsan |
| 26 | GK | Kim Kyeong-hee | 17 March 2003 (aged 19) | 0 | 0 | (Korea Football Association) Changnyeong |

== Player representation ==
=== Players ===
- Oldest (goalkeeper): (South Korea) Kim Jung-mi (38 years, 123 days)
- Oldest (outfield): (South Korea) Park Eun-sun (36 years, 53 days)
- Youngest (goalkeeper): (South Korea) Kim Keong-hee (19 years, 336 days)
- Youngest (outfield): (South Korea) Bae Ye-bin (18 years, 71 days)

=== By club ===
Clubs with 3 or more players represented are listed.

| Players | Club |
|---|---|
| 9 | (South Korea) Hyundai Steel Red Angels |
| 8 | (Italy) Juventus |
| 7 | (Belgium) OH Leuven |
| 6 | (England) Manchester City |
| 5 | (England) Manchester United, (Italy) Fiorentina, (Italy) Roma |
| 4 | (Belgium) Anderlecht, (England) Chelsea, (South Korea) Seoul City |
| 3 | (England) Brighton & Hove Albion, (England) Everton, (Italy) Milan, (Italy) Sassuolo, (Netherlands) Fortuna Sittard, (South Korea) Suwon |

=== By club nationality ===
| Country | Total players | Outside national squad |
|---|---|---|
| Italy | 26 | 1 |
| England | 26 | 4 |
| South Korea | 24 | 0 |
| Belgium | 14 | 0 |
| Netherlands | 6 | 6 |
| Spain | 3 | 3 |
| Germany | 2 | 2 |
| France | 1 | 1 |
| Switzerland | 1 | 1 |
| United States | 1 | 1 |

=== By club federation ===
| Federation | Players |
|---|---|
| UEFA | 80 |
| AFC | 24 |
| CONCACAF | 1 |
