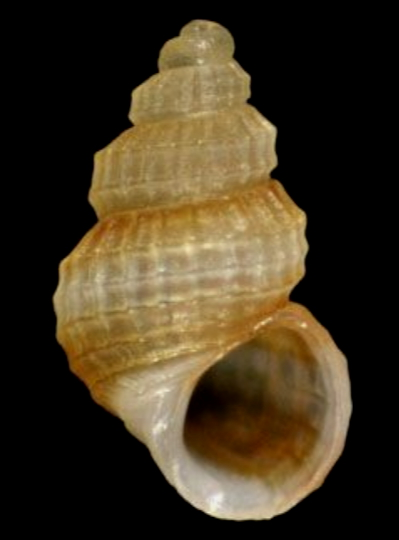
- Shell of Alvania dictyophora (specimen at the Natuurhistorisch Museum, Rotterdam)

Scientific classification
- Kingdom: Animalia
- Phylum: Mollusca
- Class: Gastropoda
- Subclass: Caenogastropoda
- Order: Littorinimorpha
- Family: Rissoidae
- Genus: Alvania
- Species: A. dictyophora

Binomial name
- Alvania dictyophora (Philippi, 1844)

Synonyms
- † Alvania (Alvinia) circumcincta L. Seguenza, 1903; † Alvania circumcincta L. Seguenza, 1903; Alvinia dictyophora (R. A. Philippi, 1844) superseded combination; † Alvania (Alvinia) circumcincta L. Seguenza, 1903; Rissoa dictyophora R. A. Philippi, 1844 superseded combination; Rissoa dictysphora [sic[ misspellingAlvinia dictyophora (Philippi 1844)

= Alvania dictyophora =

Species of gastropod

Alvania dictyophora is a species of minute sea snail, a marine gastropod mollusc or micromollusk in the family Rissoidae.

== Description ==
The length of the shell varies between 1.5 mm and 3 mm.

The thin shell is hyaline. It is dark brown or fulvous. It has distant thin longitudinal, and stronger, more distant spiral lirae, two of the latter in the penultimate and five in the body whorl; perforate. The outer lip is thin.

== Distribution ==
This species occurs in European waters (off the Azores) and rare in the Mediterranean Sea (off Sicily and Greece).

Fossils were found in Pliocene strata near San Miniato, Italy.
