= Bucciano, San Miniato =

Bucciano
- Frazione
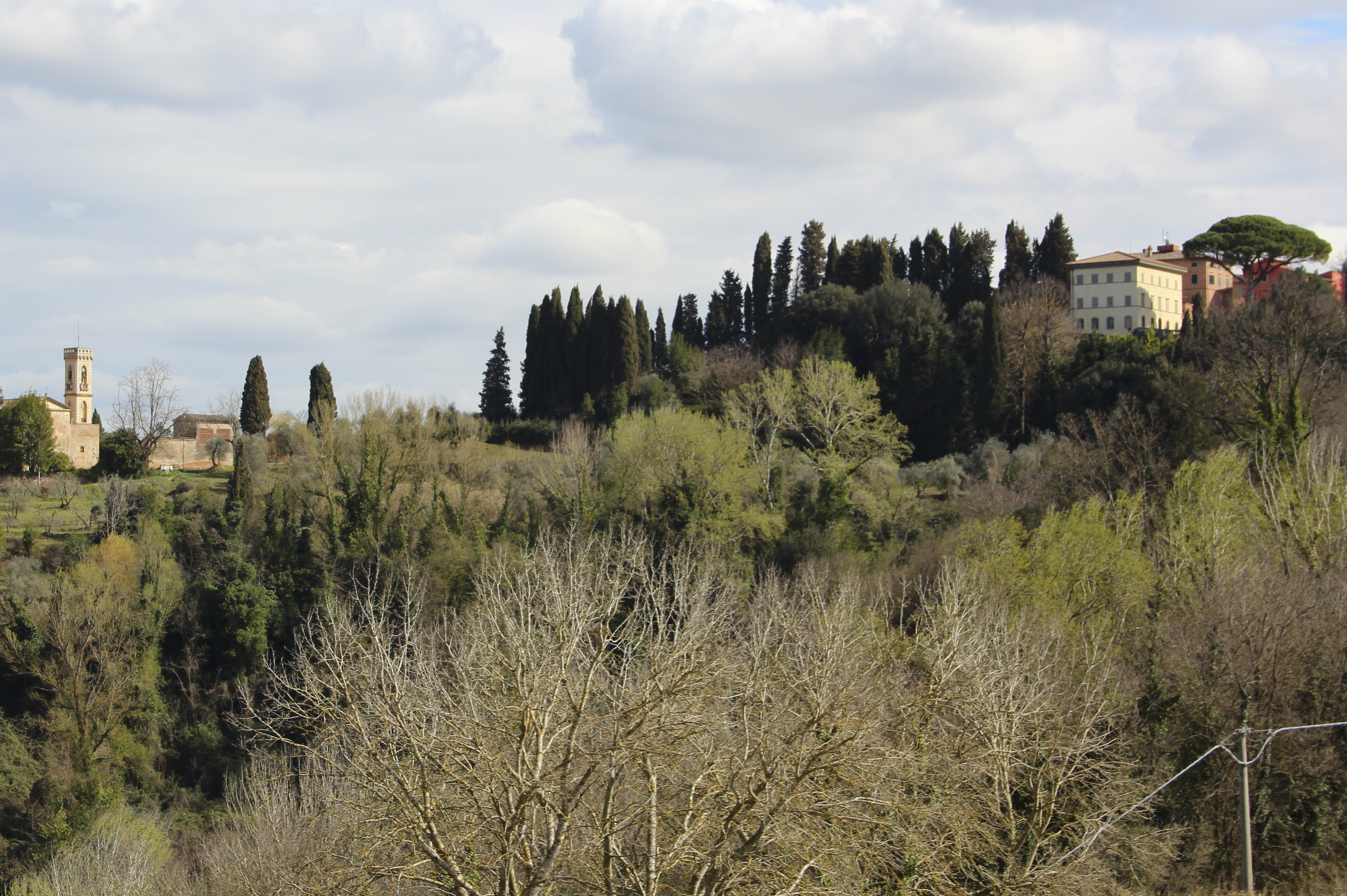

- Location of Bucciano in Italy
- Coordinates: 43°38′5″N 10°48′39″E
- Country: Italy
- Region: Tuscany
- Province: Pisa (PI)
- Comune: San Miniato
- Elevation: 191 m (627 ft)

Population (2011)
  - Total: 52
- Demonym: Buccianesi
- Time zone: UTC+1 (CET)
  - Summer (DST): UTC+2 (CEST)
- Postal code: 56028
- Dialing code: (+39) 0571

Bucciano is a village in Tuscany, central Italy, administratively a frazione of the comune of San Miniato, province of Pisa. At the time of the 2001 census its population was 36.

Bucciano is about 11 km (6.8 mi) from Pisa and 12 km (7.5 mi) from San Miniato.

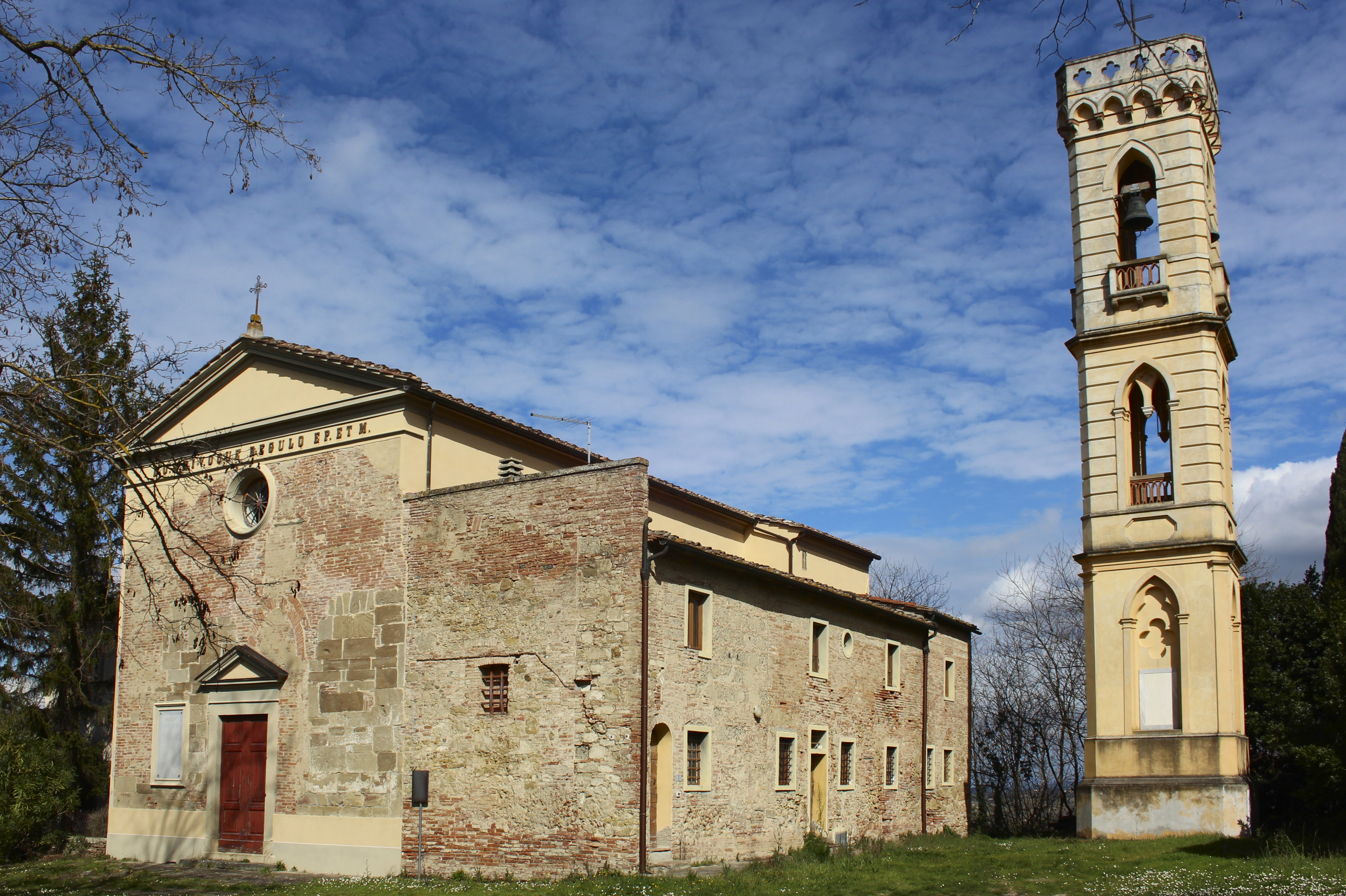
The church of San Regolo
