= San Donato, San Miniato =

San Donato
- Frazione
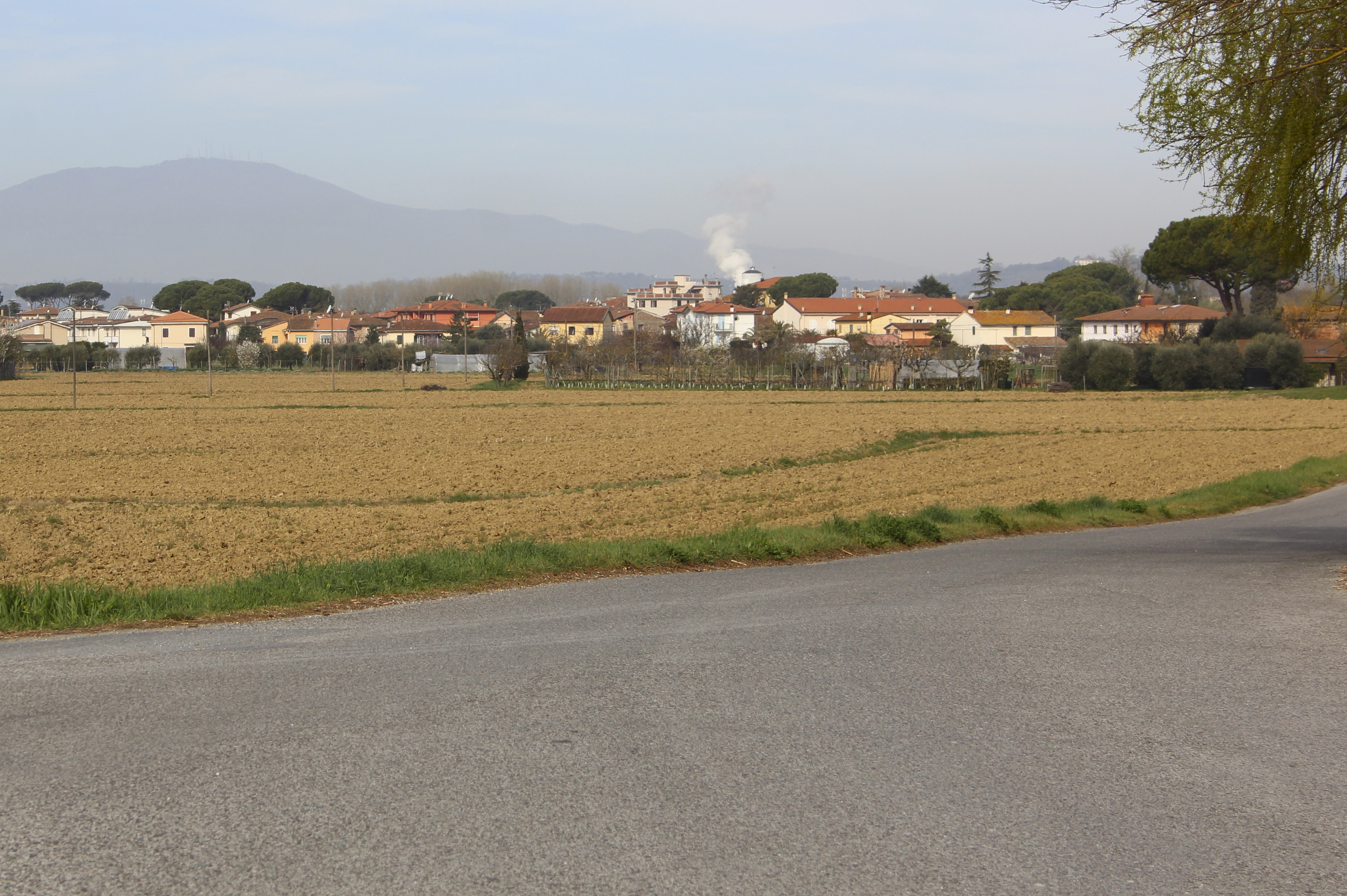

- Location of San Donato in Italy
- Coordinates: 43°42′10″N 10°47′15″E
- Country: Italy
- Region: Tuscany
- Province: Pisa (PI)
- Comune: San Miniato
- Elevation: 24 m (79 ft)

Population (2011)
  - Total: 1,827
- Time zone: UTC+1 (CET)
  - Summer (DST): UTC+2 (CEST)
- Postal code: 56028
- Dialing code: (+39) 0571

San Donato is a village in Tuscany, central Italy, administratively a frazione of the comune of San Miniato, province of Pisa. At the time of the 2001 census its population was 1,838.

San Donato is about 40 km from Pisa and 9 km from San Miniato.
