= Catena (surname) =

Catena is a surname. Notable people with the surname include:

- Alejandro Catena (born 1994), Spanish footballer
- Elena Catena (1920–2012), Spanish academic
- Gerardo Catena (1902–2000), American mobster
- Laura Catena (born 1967), Argentine vintner, physician and author
- Marina Catena, Italian soldier and United Nations official
- Michela Catena (born 1999), Italian footballer
- Paulus Catena (fl. 353–362), Roman notary and investigator
- Tom Catena (born 1964), American physician and humanitarian
- Víctor Andrés Catena (1925–2009), Spanish screenwriter and film, television and theater director
- Vincenzo Catena (c. 1470–1531), Italian painter
