= Palazzo Grifoni (San Miniato) =

Coordinates: 43.678643°N 10.847072°E

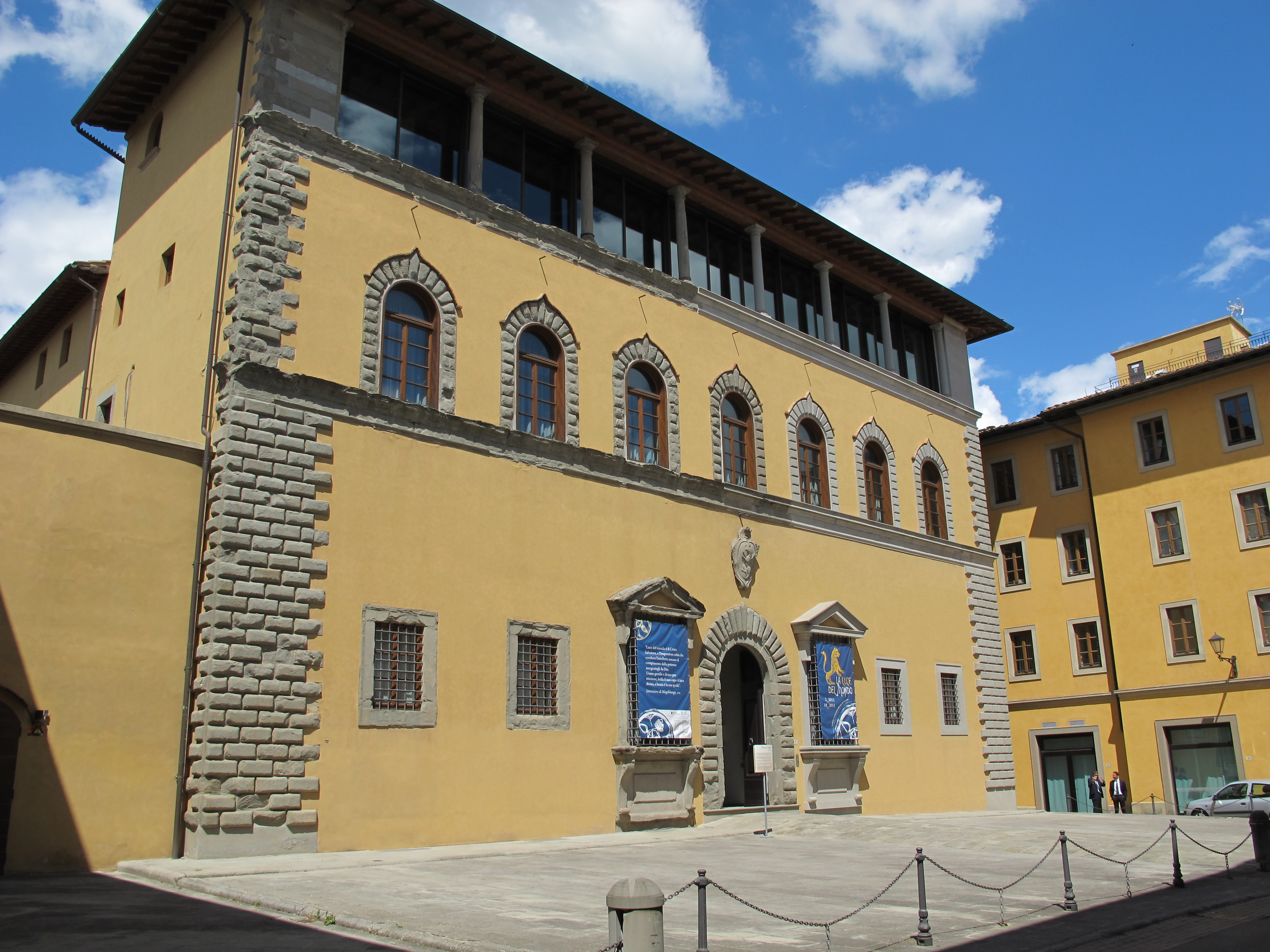
Facade

Palazzo Grifoni is a former aristocratic palace located in Piazza Grifoni San Miniato, in the Piazza Grifoni in the western side of the historic center of the town of San Miniato, province of Pisa, region of Tuscany, Italy. Piazza Grifoni lies along the same road that becomes Via Giosue Carducci to the south west and Via IV Novembre, after the intersection of Via Borgonuovo. It is now the seat of the Fondazione Cassa di Risparmio di San Miniato after having belonged to the Barnini family.

== History and description ==
The building was designed by Giuliano di Baccio d'Agnolo in strict Florentine forms and realised by the mid-16th century. It was badly damaged in the last war, but later restored.

It dominates the small square from an elevated position, like Palazzo Pitti, and has a plastered façade, with ashlars in relief along the sides that give the whole the appearance of a fortress. On the ground floor, a large arched doorway framed by blocks of pietra serena is flanked by two kneeling windows, which are followed by two rectangular openings on each side, framed by stone. The family coat of arms in stone hangs above the portal (gold, to the griffin in black accompanied in head (heraldry) by three ball (heraldry) ordered between the four pendants of a red lambello, the central ball in azure, loaded with three gold lilies, and the two lateral ones in red).

On the piano nobile, beyond a marcadavanzale frame are seven ribbed windows, with drop-arched keystones, that echo the design of the portal. The top floor is occupied by a continuous loggia, now closed by stained glass, with elegant Doric columns. At the rear, the palazzo has a courtyard overlooking the panorama of Valdarno.

== Bibliography ==
=== Italian sources ===
- Nanni G., Regoli I.: San Miniato guida storico artistica della città e del suo territorio, Pisa 2000. ISBN 88-7781-060-2.
- Toscana. Guida d’Italia (Guida rossa), Touring Club Italiano, Milano 2003. ISBN 88-365-2767-1.
