= Roffia =

- Frazione
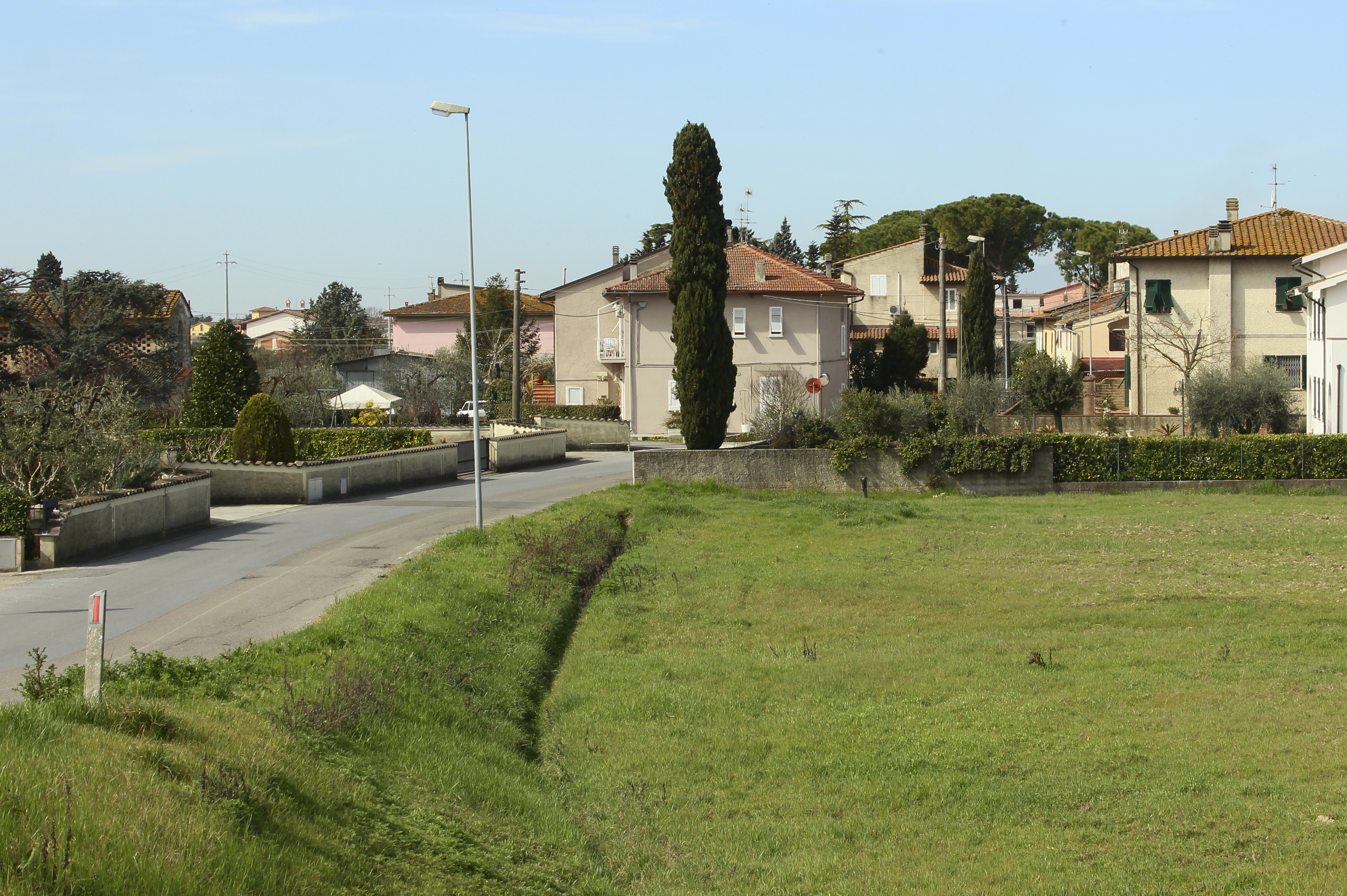

- Location of Roffia in Italy
- Coordinates: 43°42′40″N 10°51′18″E
- Country: Italy
- Region: Tuscany
- Province: Pisa (PI)
- Comune: San Miniato
- Elevation: 21 m (69 ft)

Population (2011)
  - Total: 314
- Time zone: UTC+1 (CET)
  - Summer (DST): UTC+2 (CEST)
- Postal code: 56028
- Dialing code: (+39) 0571

Roffia is a village in Tuscany, central Italy, administratively a frazione of the comune of San Miniato, province of Pisa. It is located along the southern banks of the Arno river, about 4 km from the municipal center of San Miniato and about 50 km from Pisa. Near the hamlet there is a lake (Roffia Lake) which was formed following the various floods of the Arno in the 14th and 15th centuries. In the 1980s, a recovery plan began for the transformation of the lake area into a specialized river park for canoeing competitions and for international rowing.

At the time of the 2001 census its population was 232.

== History ==
Formerly known as Ria, the village of Roffia is mentioned for the first time in a document from August 2, 995 and is mentioned again in the papal bull of Pope Celestine III of 24 April 1194 due to the presence of the church of San Michele in Roda, as a branch of the parish church of San Genesio. Over the centuries, the village took the name of one of the most important and influential families of San Miniato, perhaps descended from a rich Roctia woman, attested in the tenth century. The proximity to the Arno river and the lake has always made the country vulnerable to floods: in the winter between 2013 and 2014 it was affected by such conditions that raised the lake level almost exceeded the banks.

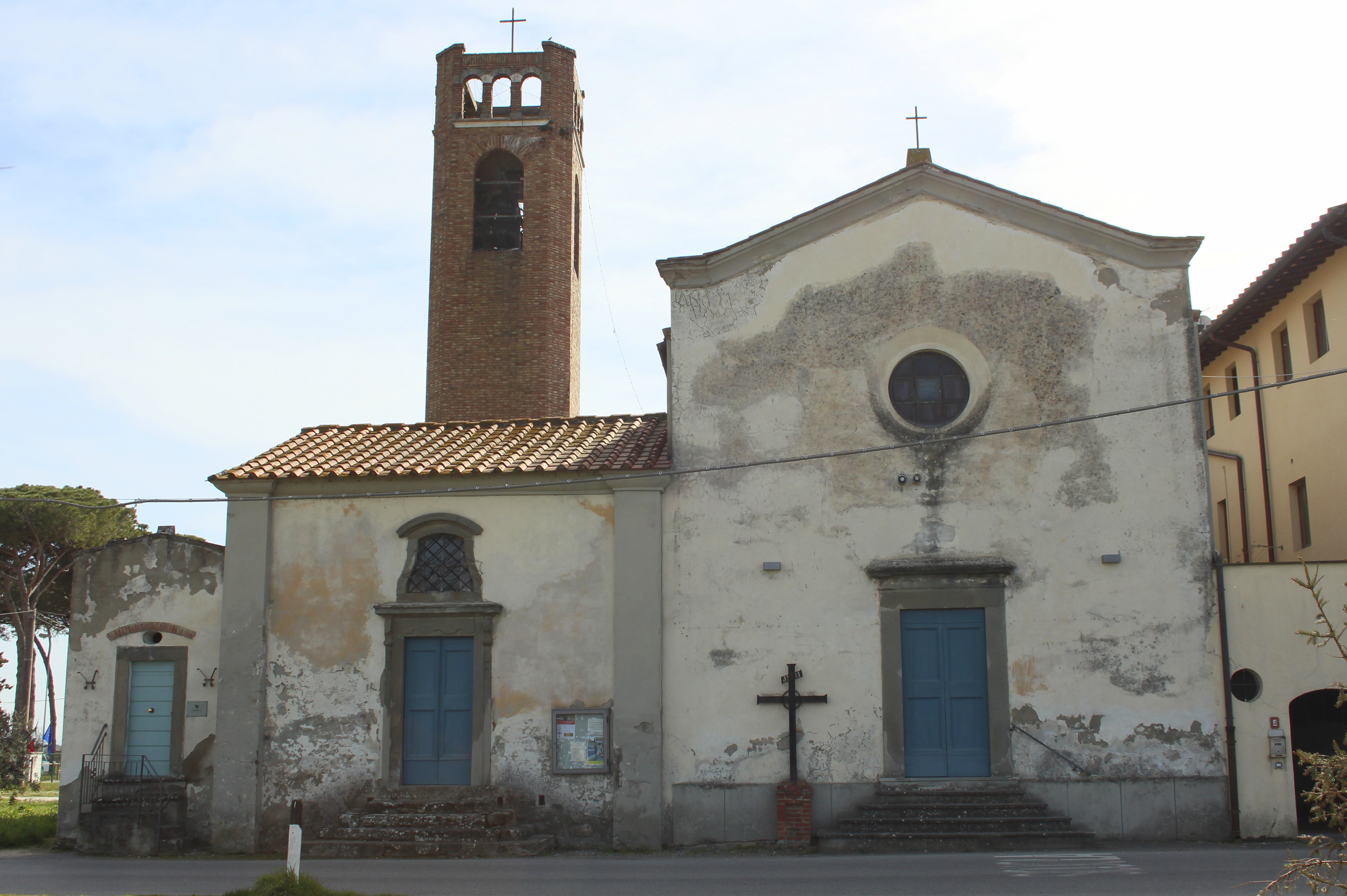
The church San Michele Arcangelo

== Monuments ==
The church of San Michele (Saint Michael's church) is an ancient parish church (attested in 1194 by Pope Celestine III) as dependent on the parish church of San Genesio. The church is home to a parish that extends over a territory of 515 inhabitants.
