= Moriolo =

- Frazione
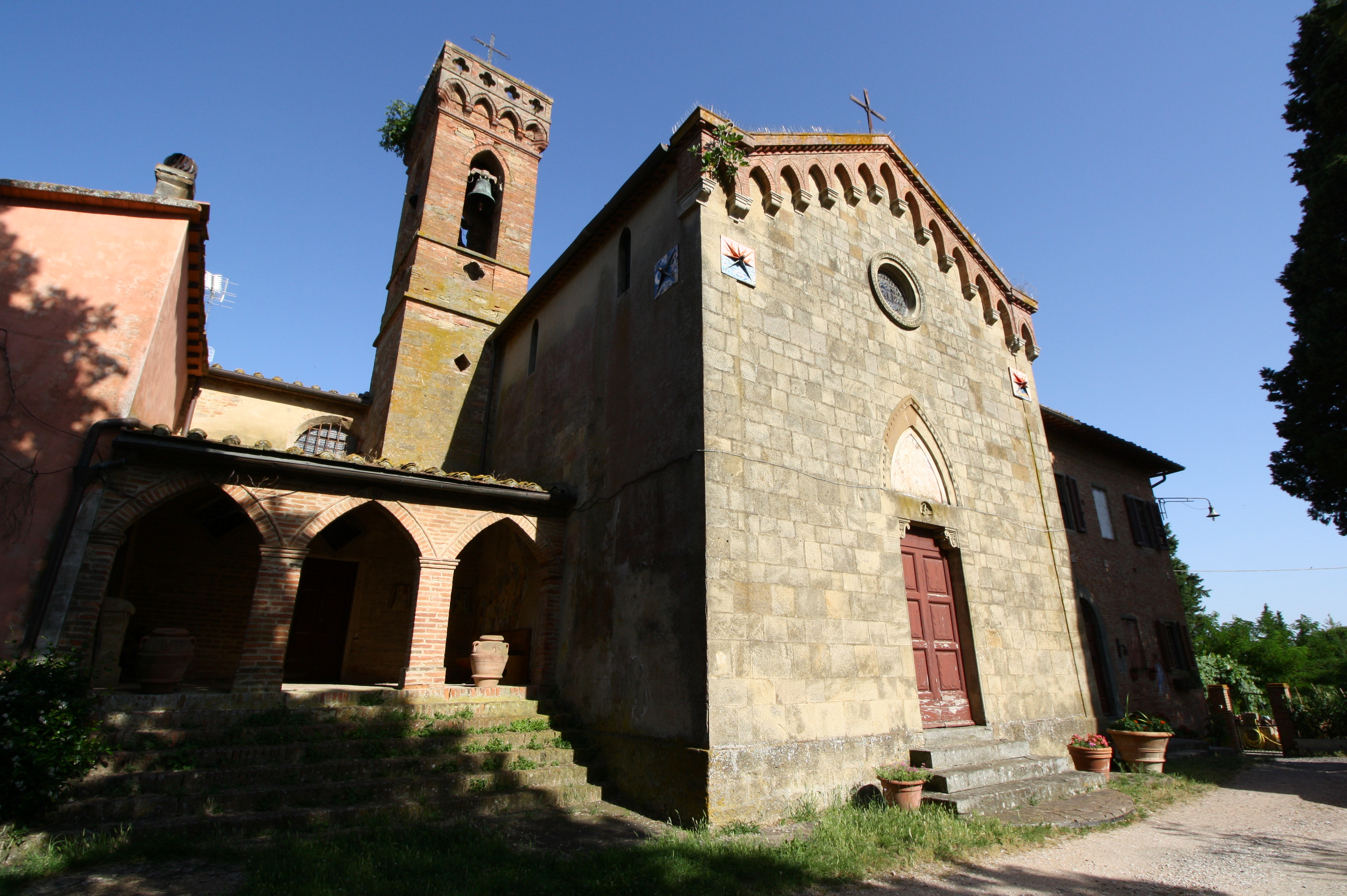
- The church of San Germano in Moriolo

- Location of Moriolo in Italy
- Coordinates: 43°39′13″N 10°50′00″E
- Country: Italy
- Region: Tuscany
- Province: Pisa (PI)
- Comune: San Miniato
- Elevation: 138 m (453 ft)

Population (2011)
  - Total: 18
- Time zone: UTC+1 (CET)
  - Summer (DST): UTC+2 (CEST)
- Postal code: 56028
- Dialing code: (+39) 0571

Moriolo is a village in Tuscany, central Italy, administratively a frazione of the comune of San Miniato, province of Pisa. At the time of the 2001 census its population was 10.

Moriolo is about 50 km from Pisa and 5 km from San Miniato.
