= San Miniato Basso =

- Frazione
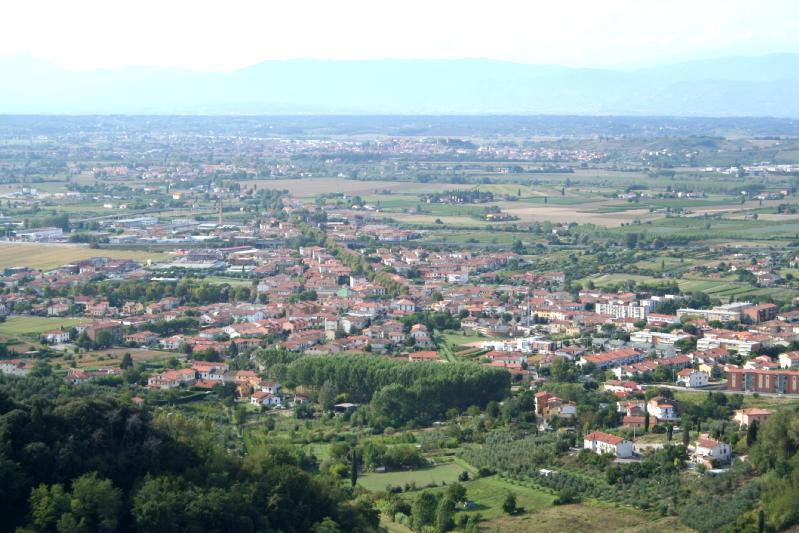
- View of San Miniato Basso

- Location of San Miniato Basso in Italy
- Coordinates: 43°41′35″N 10°50′30″E
- Country: Italy
- Region: Tuscany
- Province: Pisa (PI)
- Comune: San Miniato
- Elevation: 25 m (82 ft)

Population
  - Total: 6,050
- Time zone: UTC+1 (CET)
  - Summer (DST): UTC+2 (CEST)
- Postal code: 56028
- Dialing code: (+39) 0571

San Miniato Basso is a village in Tuscany, central Italy, administratively a frazione of the comune of San Miniato, province of Pisa.

San Miniato Basso is about 45 km from Pisa and 2 km from San Miniato.

== Bibliography ==
- Caciagli, Giuseppe (1972). Pisa e la sua provincia. Vol. 3. Pisa: Colombo Cursi Editore.
