= Stibbio =

- Frazione
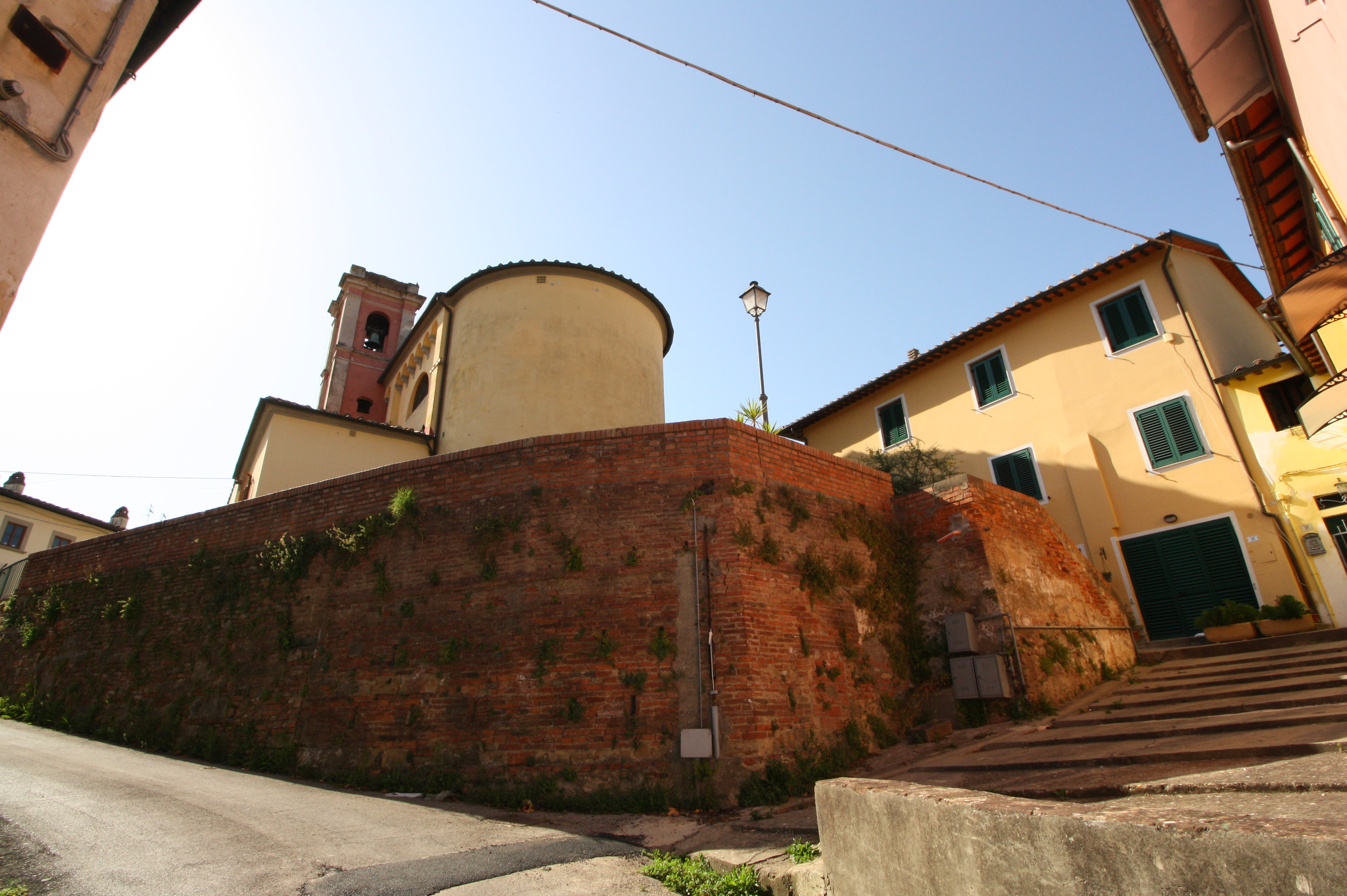

- Location of Stibbio in Italy
- Coordinates: 43°40′25″N 10°46′55″E
- Country: Italy
- Region: Tuscany
- Province: Pisa (PI)
- Comune: San Miniato
- Elevation: 92 m (302 ft)

Population (2011)
  - Total: 257
- Demonym(s): Stibbiesi, Stibbiolini
- Time zone: UTC+1 (CET)
  - Summer (DST): UTC+2 (CEST)
- Postal code: 56028
- Dialing code: (+39) 0571

Stibbio is a village in Tuscany, central Italy, administratively a frazione of the comune of San Miniato, province of Pisa. At the time of the 2001 census its population was 222.

Stibbio is about 45 km from Pisa and 8 km from San Miniato.
