= Molino d'Egola =

- Frazione
- Location of Molino d'Egola in Italy
- Coordinates: 43°40′53″N 10°48′23″E
- Country: Italy
- Region: Tuscany
- Province: Pisa (PI)
- Comune: San Miniato
- Elevation: 28 m (92 ft)

Population
  - Total: 800
- Time zone: UTC+1 (CET)
  - Summer (DST): UTC+2 (CEST)
- Postal code: 56028
- Dialing code: (+39) 0571

Molino d'Egola is a village in Tuscany, central Italy, administratively a frazione of the comune of San Miniato, province of Pisa. Its main tourist actraction is called "festival della birra", organized during the month of october.

Molino d'Egola is about 43 km from Pisa and 6 km from San Miniato.

== Bibliography ==
- Caciagli, Giuseppe (1972). Pisa e la sua provincia. Vol. 3. Pisa: Colombo Cursi Editore.
