= Balconevisi =

- Frazione
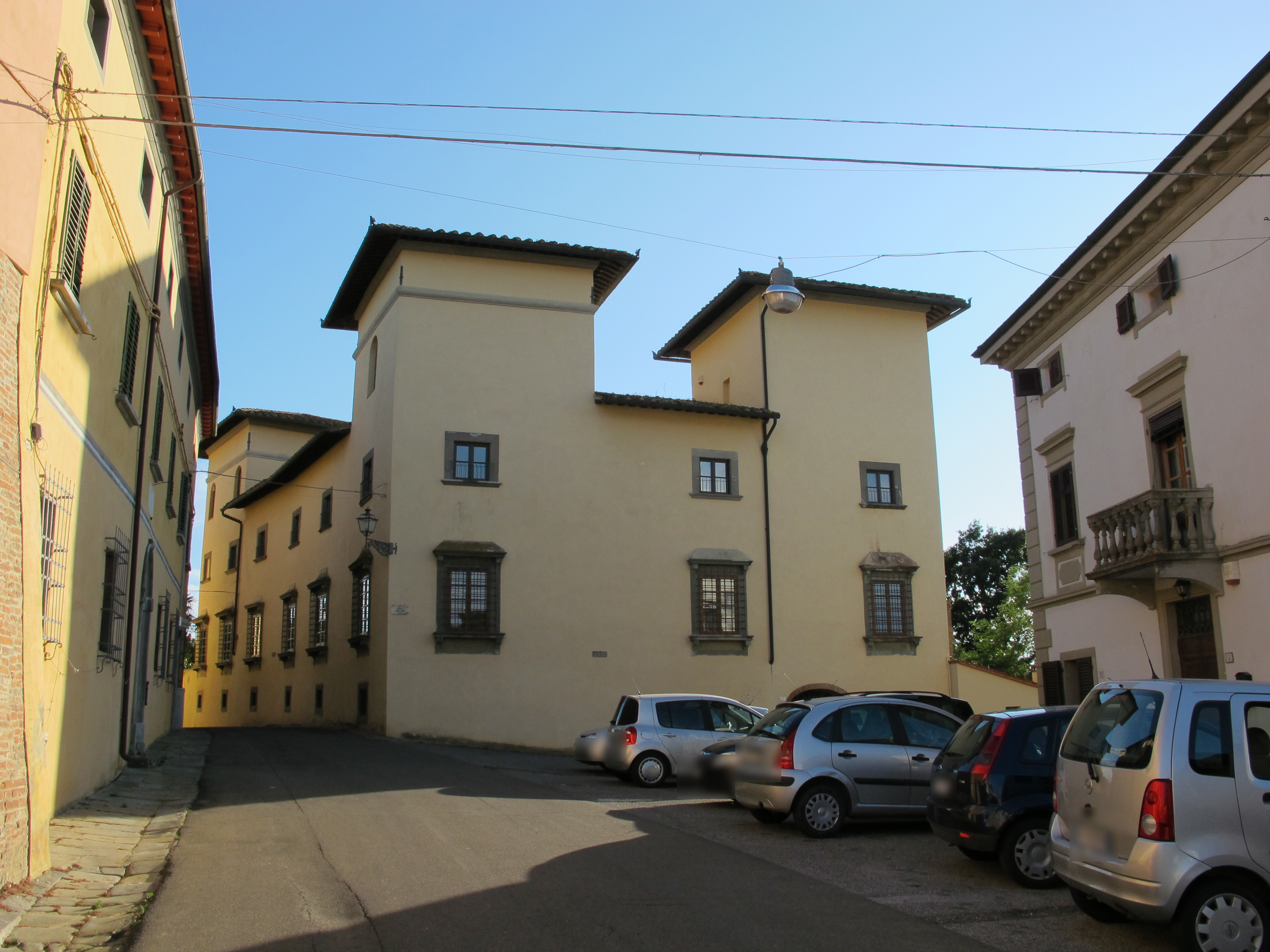
- Villa Strozzi in Balconevisi

- Location of Balconevisi in Italy
- Coordinates: 43°37′51″N 10°50′4″E
- Country: Italy
- Region: Tuscany
- Province: Pisa (PI)
- Comune: San Miniato
- Elevation: 136 m (446 ft)

Population (2011)
  - Total: 244
- Demonym: Balconevisani
- Time zone: UTC+1 (CET)
  - Summer (DST): UTC+2 (CEST)
- Postal code: 56028
- Dialing code: (+39) 0571

Balconevisi is a village in Tuscany, central Italy, administratively a frazione of the comune of San Miniato, province of Pisa. At the time of the 2001 census, its population was 153.

Balconevisi is about 50 km (31 mi) from Pisa and 12 km (7.5 mi) from San Miniato.
