= Ponte a Egola =

- Frazione
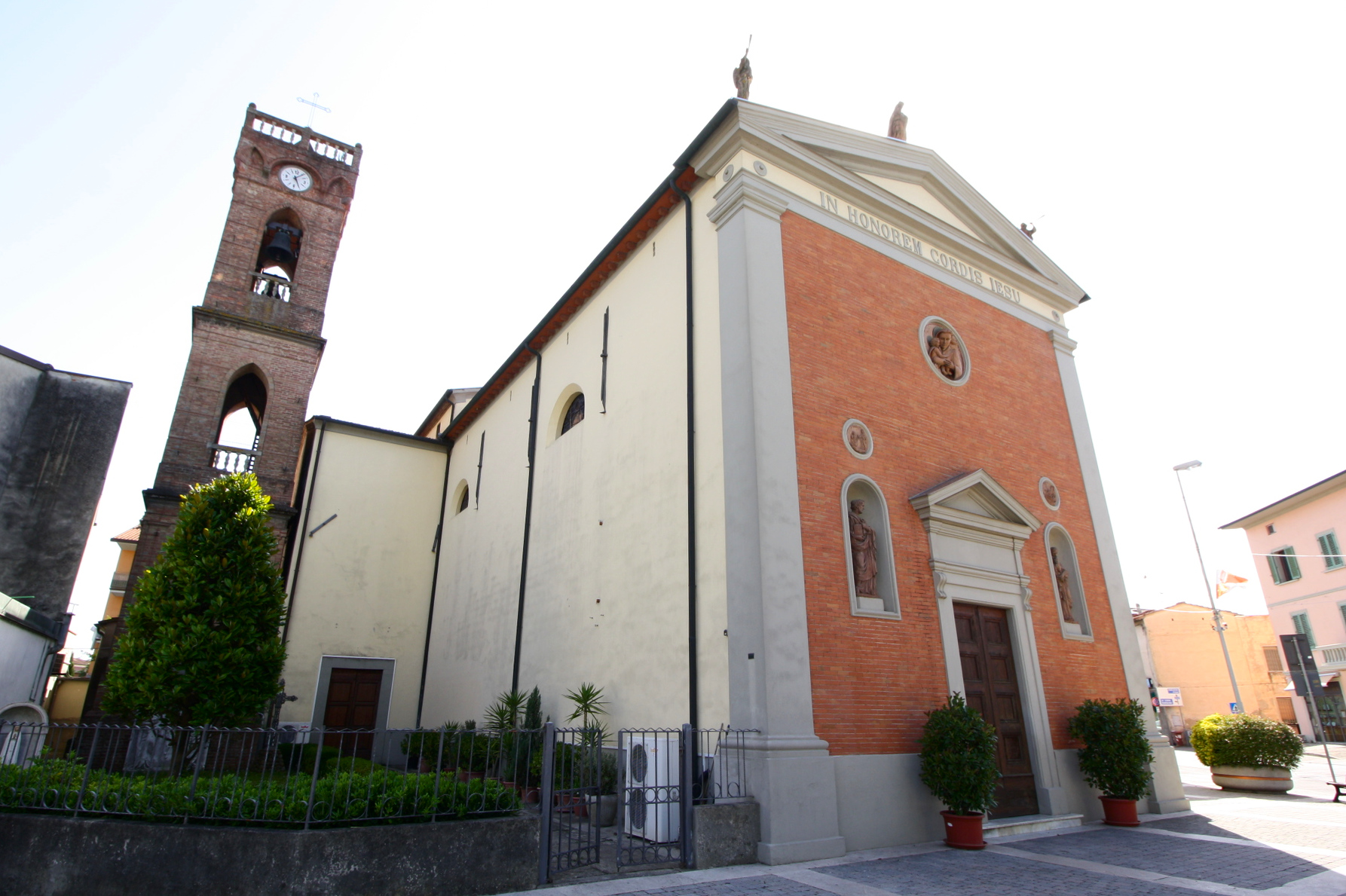
- The church of Sacro Cuore

- Location of Ponte a Egola in Italy
- Coordinates: 43°40′59″N 10°47′42″E
- Country: Italy
- Region: Tuscany
- Province: Pisa (PI)
- Comune: San Miniato
- Elevation: 29 m (95 ft)

Population
  - Total: 7,150
- Demonym: Ponteaegolesi
- Time zone: UTC+1 (CET)
  - Summer (DST): UTC+2 (CEST)
- Postal code: 56028
- Dialing code: (+39) 0571

Ponte a Egola is a village in Tuscany, central Italy, administratively a frazione of the comune of San Miniato, province of Pisa.

Ponte a Egola is about 42 km from Pisa and 6 km from San Miniato.

== Bibliography ==
- Caciagli, Giuseppe (1972). Pisa e la sua provincia. Vol. 3. Pisa: Colombo Cursi Editore.
