= Cusignano =

- Frazione
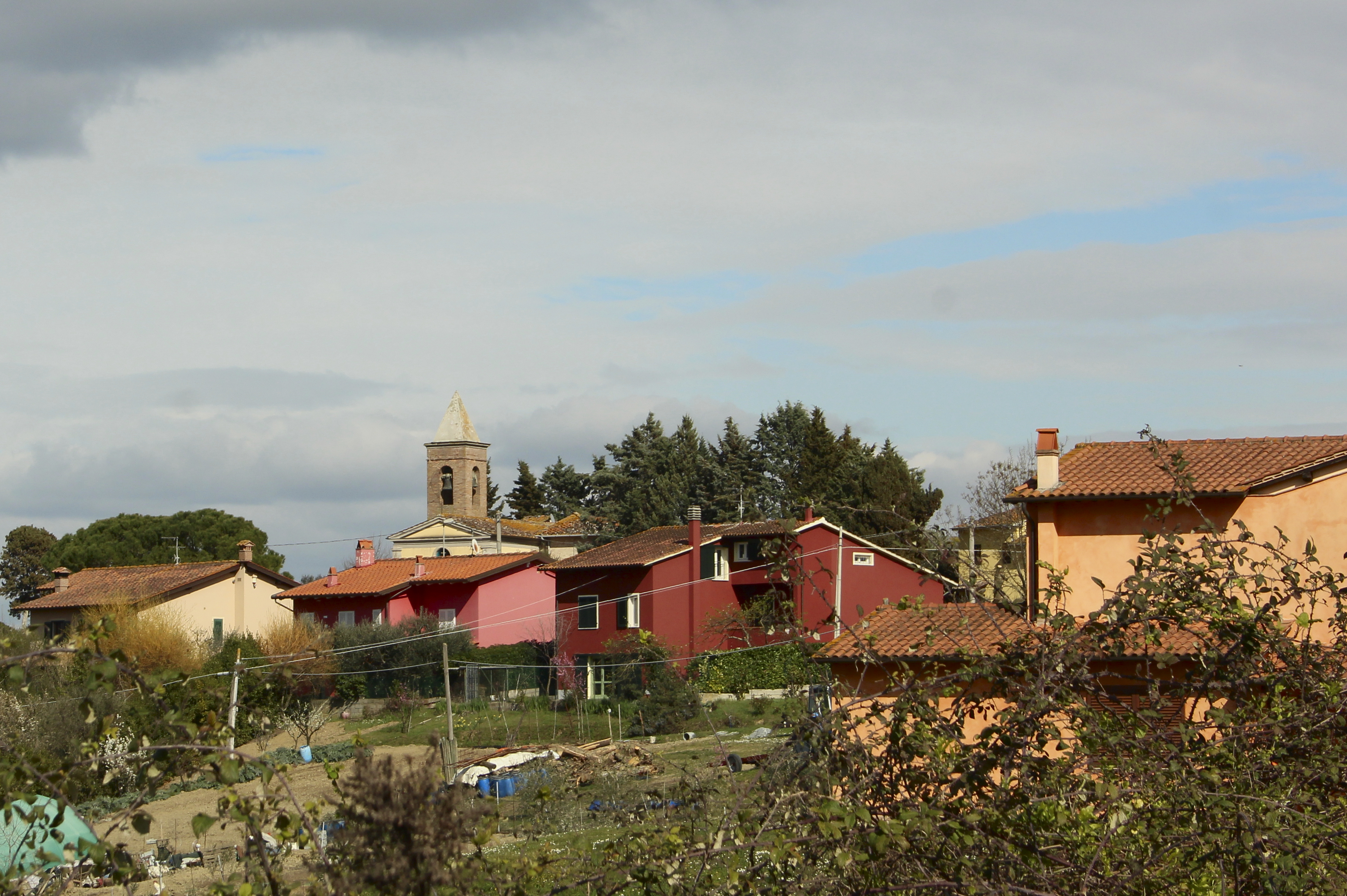

- Location of Cusignano in Italy
- Coordinates: 43°39′07″N 10°51′47″E
- Country: Italy
- Region: Tuscany
- Province: Pisa (PI)
- Comune: San Miniato
- Elevation: 150 m (490 ft)

Population (2011)
  - Total: 73
- Demonym: Cusignanesi
- Time zone: UTC+1 (CET)
  - Summer (DST): UTC+2 (CEST)
- Postal code: 56028
- Dialing code: (+39) 0571

Cusignano is a village in Tuscany, central Italy, administratively a frazione of the comune of San Miniato, province of Pisa. At the time of the 2001 census its population was 51.

Cusignano is about 50 km from Pisa and 6 km from San Miniato.

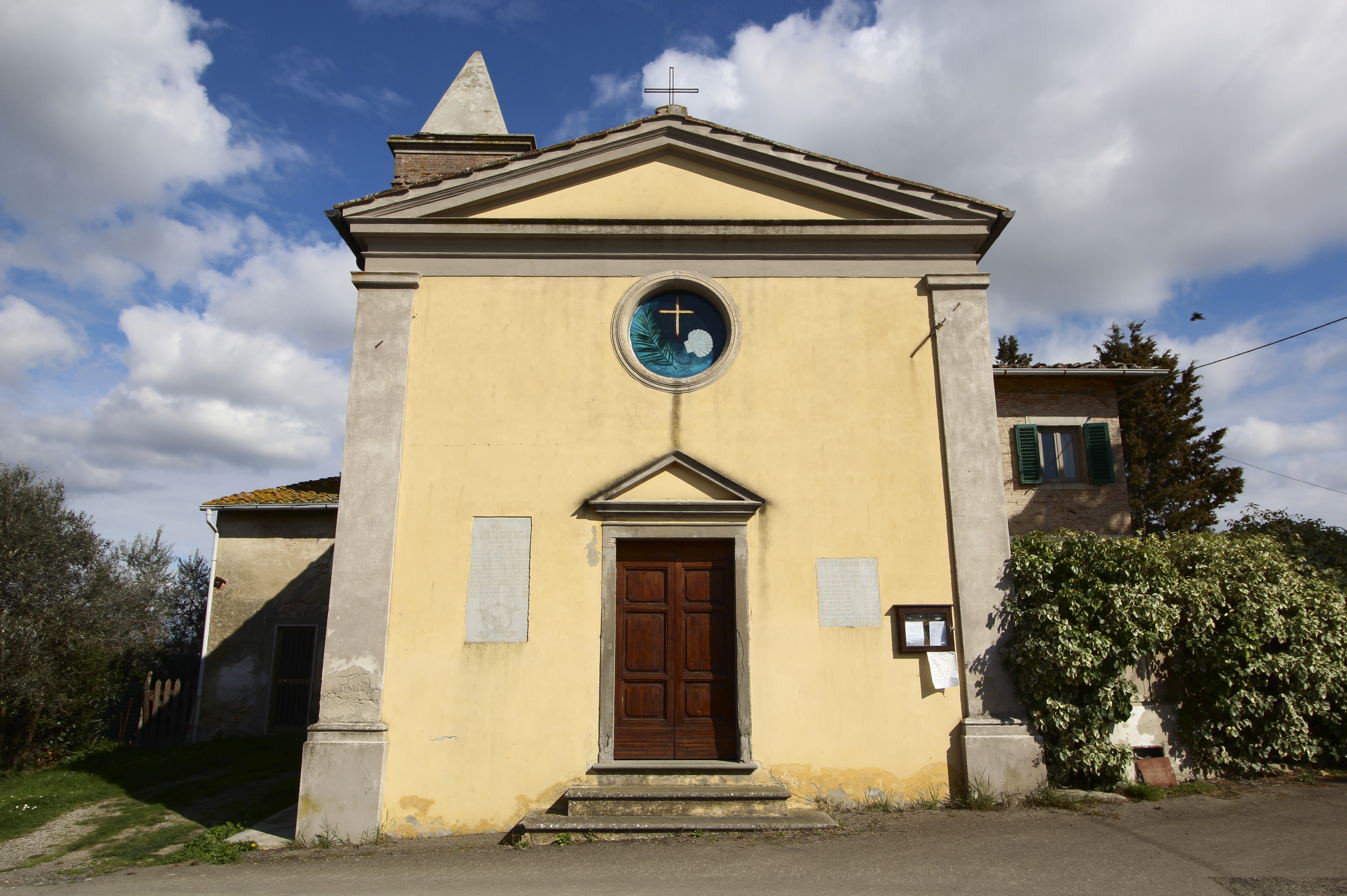
The church of Santa Lucia
