= La Serra, San Miniato =

La Serra
- Frazione
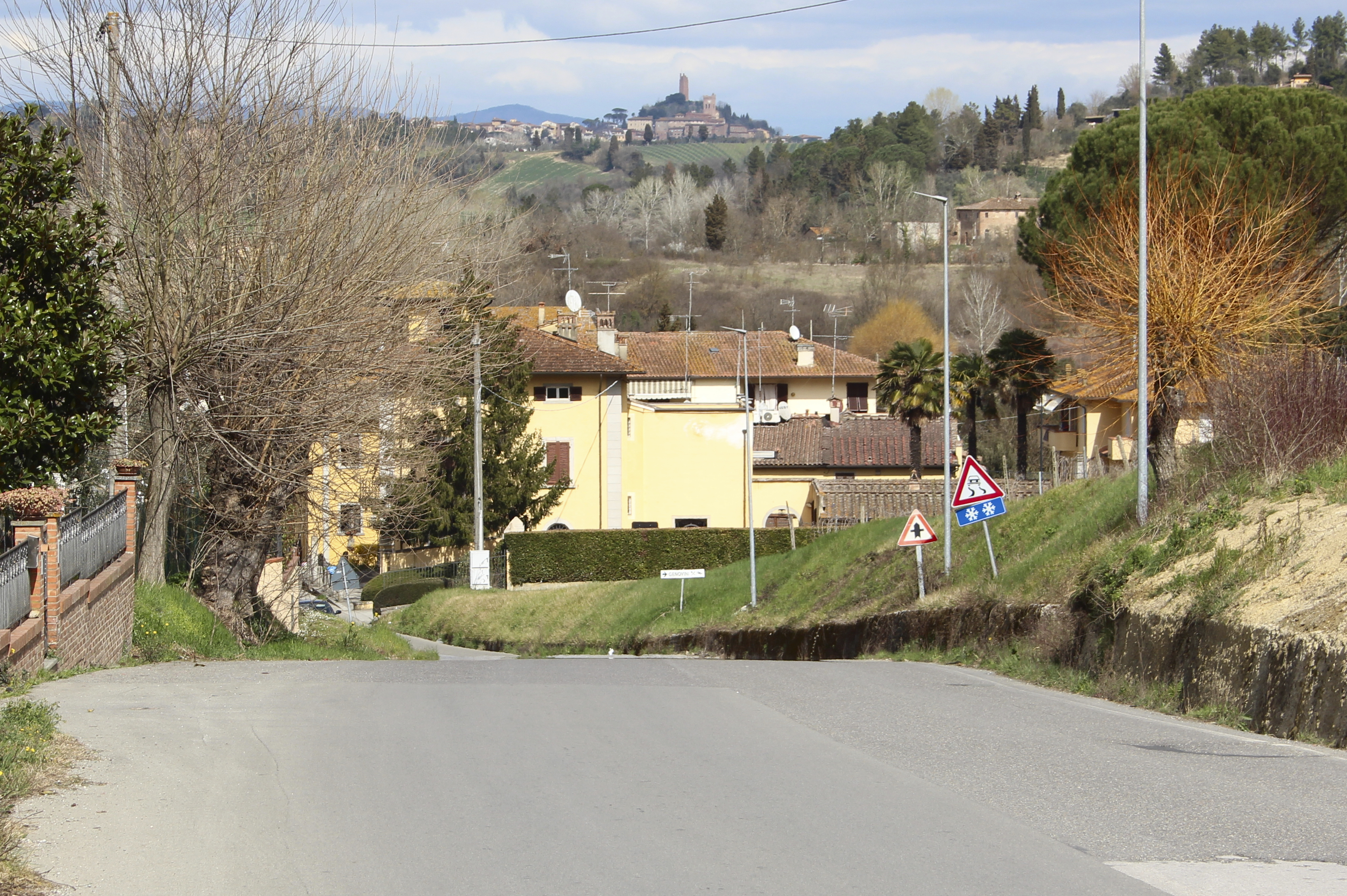

- Location of La Serra in Italy
- Coordinates: 43°38′43″N 10°48′48″E
- Country: Italy
- Region: Tuscany
- Province: Pisa (PI)
- Comune: San Miniato
- Elevation: 45 m (148 ft)

Population (2011)
  - Total: 510
- Demonym: Serrani
- Time zone: UTC+1 (CET)
  - Summer (DST): UTC+2 (CEST)
- Postal code: 56028
- Dialing code: (+39) 0571

La Serra is a village in Tuscany, central Italy, administratively a frazione of the comune of San Miniato, province of Pisa. At the time of the 2001 census its population was 403.

La Serra is about 45 km from Pisa and 8 km from San Miniato.
