= Ponte a Elsa =

- Frazione
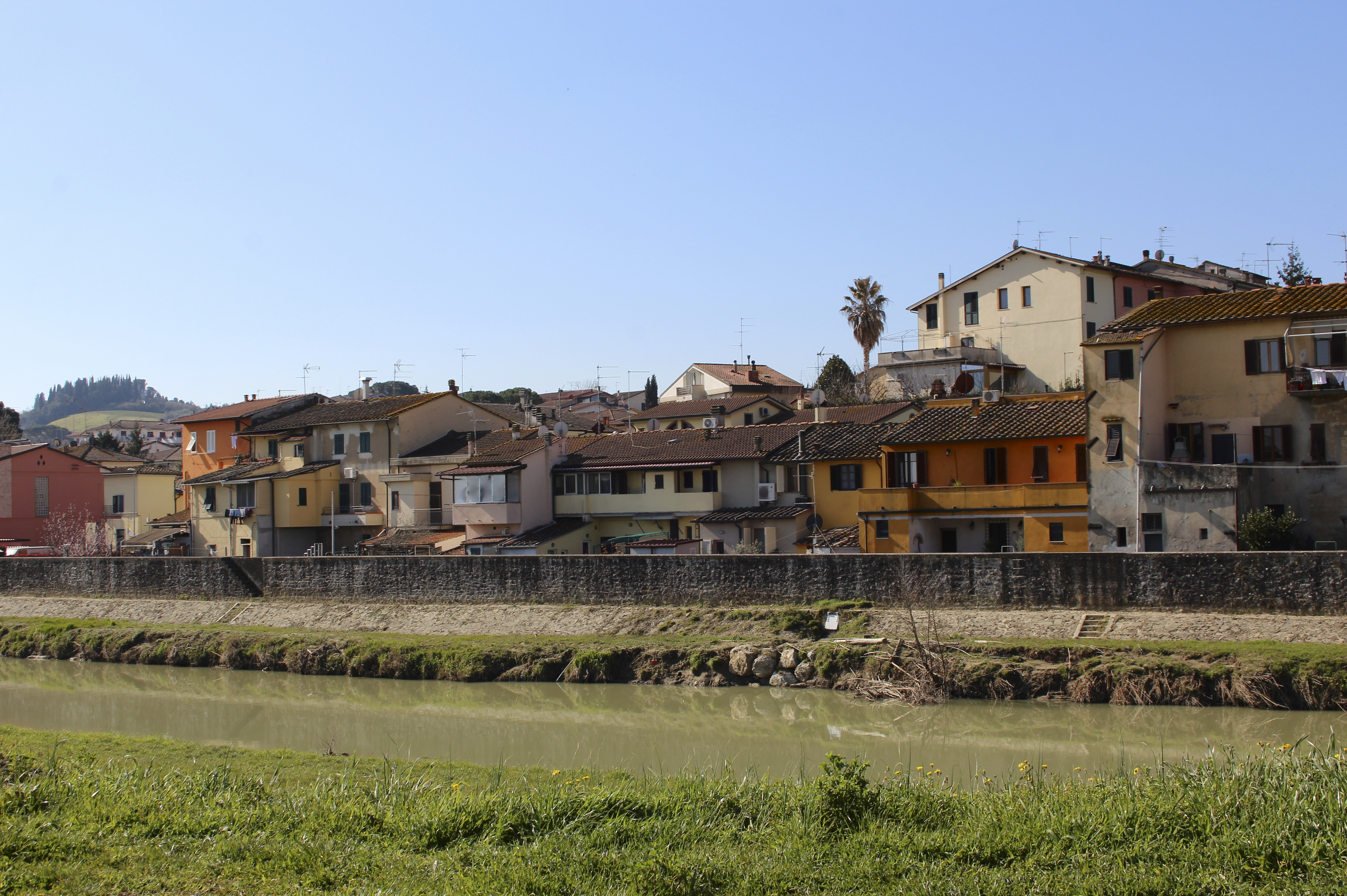

- Location of Ponte a Elsa in Italy
- Coordinates: 43°41′20″N 10°53′42″E
- Country: Italy
- Region: Tuscany
- Province: Florence (FI); Pisa (PI)
- Comune: Empoli; San Miniato
- Elevation: 30 m (98 ft)

Population (2011)
  - Total: 3,609
- Demonym: Pontedelsesi
- Time zone: UTC+1 (CET)
  - Summer (DST): UTC+2 (CEST)
- Postal code: 50053 (FI); 56028 (PI)
- Dialing code: (+39) 0571

Ponte a Elsa is a town in Tuscany, central Italy, administratively a frazione of the comuni of Empoli (Metropolitan City of Florence) and San Miniato (province of Pisa). At the time of the 2011 census its population was 3,609.

Ponte a Elsa is about 40 km (25 mi) from Florence, 50 km (31 mi) from Pisa, 7 km (4.3 mi) from Empoli and 5 km (3 mi) from San Miniato.
