= Michelle Colson =

Belgian association football player

Personal information
- Date of birth: 19 September 1998 (age 28)
- Place of birth: Belgium
- Position: Defender

Senior career*
Years	Team	Apps	(Gls)
2019–2023	Anderlecht		
2023–2024	Rangers	4	(0)

International career
2022–	Belgium	2	(0)
- * Club domestic league appearances and goals

Michelle Colson (born 19 September 1998) is a Belgian former footballer who played for the Belgium national team.

== Early life ==
Colson is a native of Rotem, Belgium, and studied economics.

== Club career ==
In 2019, Colson signed for Belgian side Anderlecht, where she was regarded as one of the club's most important players. In 2023, she signed for Scottish side Rangers.

== International career ==
Colson represented Belgium internationally at youth level and was first called up to the Belgium women's national football team for the 2023 Arnold Clark Cup.

== Style of play ==
Colson mainly operated as a defender and was known for her heading ability.
