= San Miniato =

- Comune
- Città di San Miniato
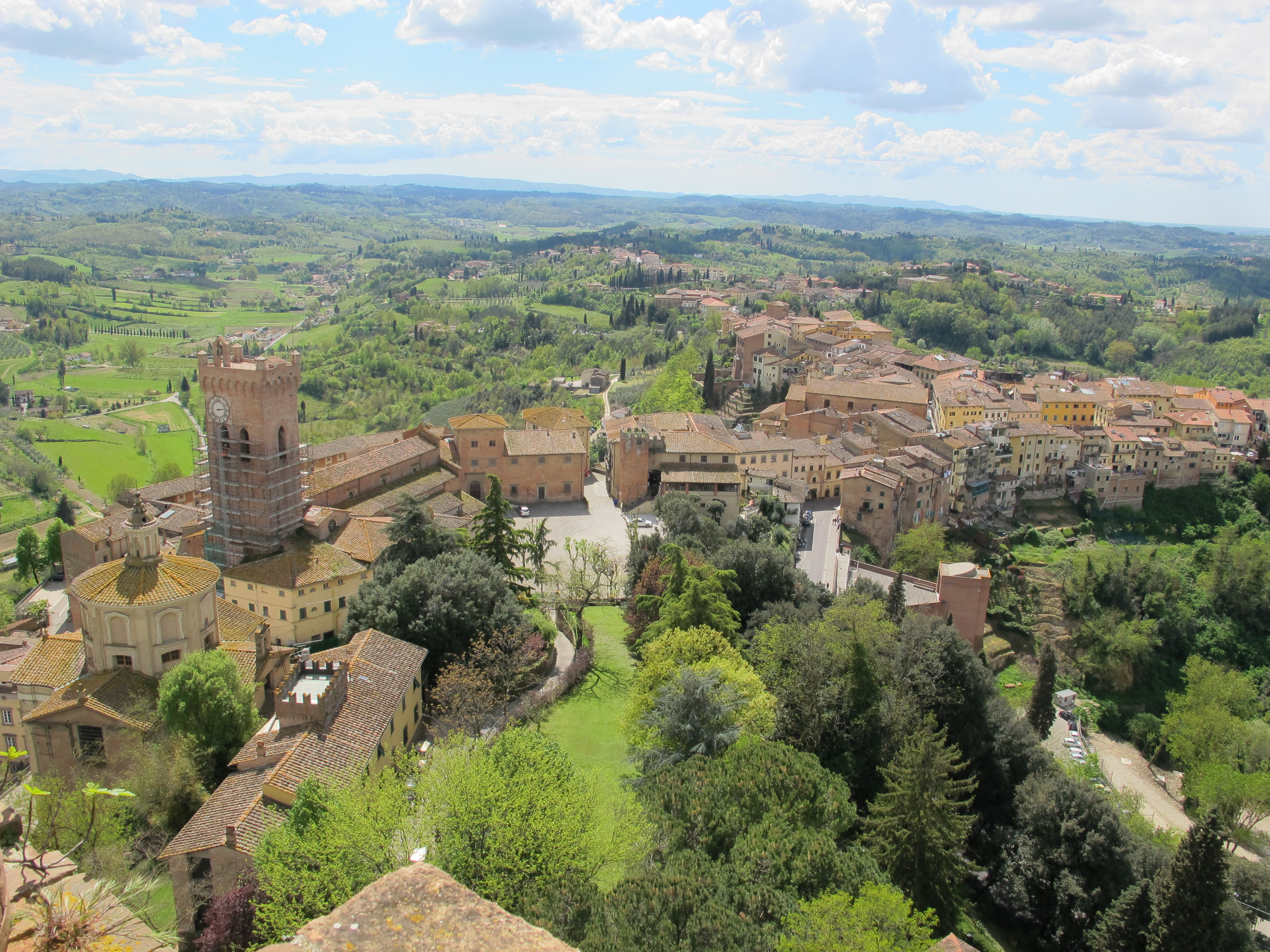

- Flag Coat of arms
- Motto(s): Sic nos in sceptra reponis So you bring us back to power
- Location within Italy Location within Tuscany
- Coordinates: 43°41′N 10°51′E
- Country: Italy
- Region: Tuscany
- Province: Pisa (PI)
- Frazioni: see list

Government
  - Mayor: Simone Giglioli (PD) since 9 June 2019

Area
  - Total: 102 km^{2} (39 sq mi)
- Elevation: 140 m (460 ft)

Population (31 December 2010)
  - Total: 28,257
  - Density: 277/km^{2} (718/sq mi)
- Demonym: Samminiatesi
- Time zone: UTC+1 (CET)
  - Summer (DST): UTC+2 (CEST)
- Postal code: 56027
- Dialing code: 0571
- Patron saint: Genesius of Rome
- Saint day: 25 August
- Website: Official website

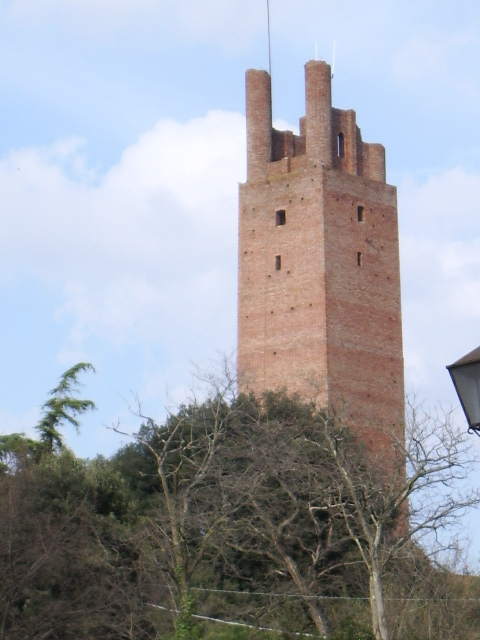
Tower of Frederick II in San Miniato

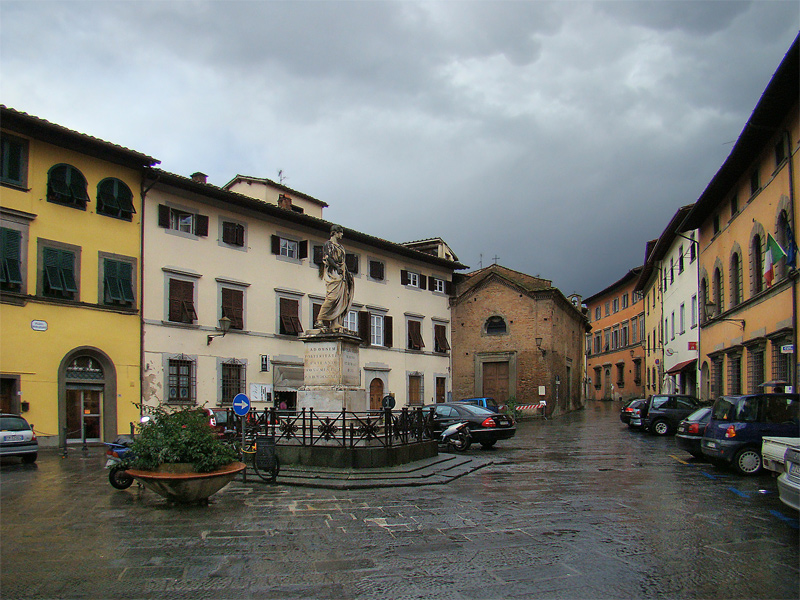
Piazza Buonaparte

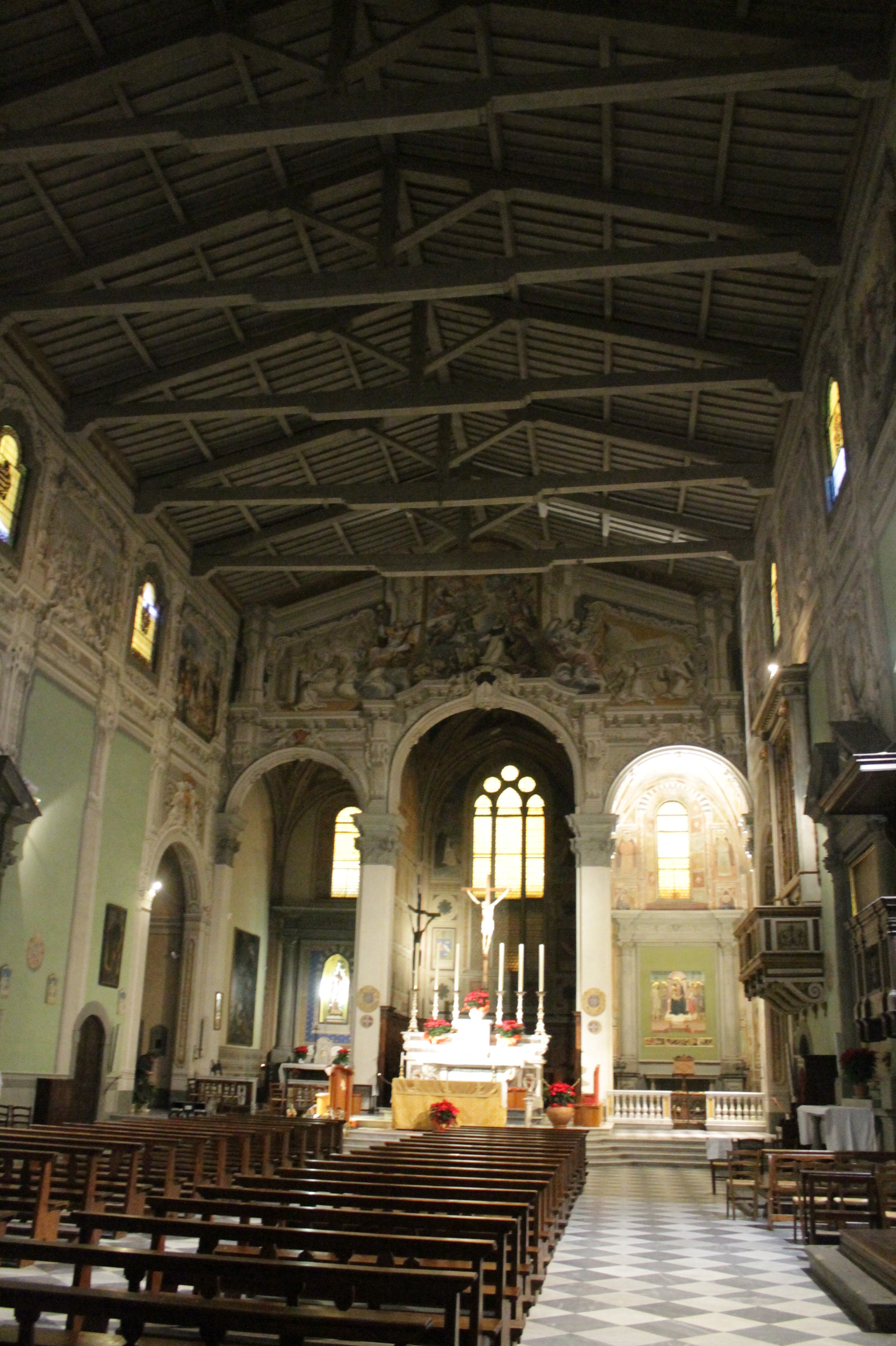
Interior, church of San Domenico, San Miniato

San Miniato is a town and comune (municipality) in the province of Pisa, in the region of Tuscany, Italy.

San Miniato sits at a historically strategic location atop three small hills where it dominates the lower Arno valley, between the valleys of the Egola and Elsa rivers. It used to carry the additional sobriquet al Tedesco ("to the German") to distinguish it from the convent of San Miniato al Monte in Florence, which is about 40 kilometres (25 mi) to the northeast.

== History ==
In medieval times, San Miniato was on the via Francigena, which was the main connecting route between northern Europe and Rome. It also sits at the intersection of the Florence-Pisa and the Lucca-Siena roads. Over the centuries, San Miniato was therefore exposed to a constant flow of friendly and hostile armies, traders in all manner of goods and services, and other travellers from near and far.

Archaeological evidence indicates that the site of the town and the surrounding area has been settled since at least the Paleolithic era. It would have been well known to the Etruscans, and certainly to the Romans, for whom it was a military post called "Quarto".

The first mention in historical documents is of a small village organised around a chapel dedicated to San Miniato, built by the Lombards in 783. By the end of the 10th century, San Miniato boasted a sizeable population enclosed behind a moat and protected by a castle built by Otto I. In 1116, the new imperial vicar for Tuscany, Rabodo, established himself at San Miniato, supplanting Florence as the centre of government. The site came to be known as al Tedesco, since the imperial vicars, mostly German, ruled Tuscany from there until the 13th century.

The first walls, with defensive towers, were thrown up in the 12th century during the time that Italy was dominated by Frederick Barbarossa. Under his grandson, Frederick II, the town was further fortified with expanded walls and other defensive works, including the Rocca and its tower.

During the latter years of the 13th century and the entire 14th century, San Miniato was drawn into the ongoing conflict between the Ghibelline and Guelph forces. Initially Ghibelline, it had become a Guelph city by 1291, allied with Florence and, in 1307, fought with other members of the Guelph league against the Ghibelline Arezzo.

By 1347 San Miniato was under Florentine control, where it remained, but for a brief period from 1367-1370 when, instigated by Pisa, it rebelled against Florence, and again for single month between April and May 1799, when a short-lived jacobin republic was proclaimed during the Napoleonic conquest. It was still part of the Grand Duchy of Tuscany when the Duchy was absorbed into the newly formed Kingdom of Italy in 1860.

On 22 July 1944, an American artillery shell exploded there, causing the death of 55 people. The church was filled with civilians rounded up by the Germans. A commemorative plaque is located on the facade of the church in honour of the victims (Italian: Strage del Duomo di San Miniato).

== Geography ==
Frazioni

Balconevisi, Bucciano, Catena, Cigoli, Corazzano, Cusignano, Isola, La Scala, La Serra, Molino d'Egola, Moriolo, Ponte a Egola, Ponte a Elsa, Roffia, San Donato, San Miniato Basso, San Romano, Stibbio.

Località

Borghigiana, Calenzano, Campriano, Canneto, Canuto, Casastrada, Collebrunacchi, Dogaia, Genovini, Marzana, Montebicchieri, Palagio, Parrino, San Quintino, Sant'Angelo a Montorzo, Volpaio.

== Economy ==
=== White truffles ===
During the last three weeks of November, San Miniato hosts a festival devoted to the gastronomically precious white truffle which is harvested in the area around the city. The white truffle is more highly valued than the black truffles found in Umbria and the Marche, and commands very high prices, reflected in the cost of restaurant dishes that incorporate truffles. In 1954, a record-breaking truffle found close to the nearby village of Balconevisi weighed in at 2,520 grams (5.56 lb) and was sent to the United States of America as a gift for President Dwight D. Eisenhower.

- Cassa di Risparmio di San Miniato

== Main sights ==
The city is enclosed within a well-preserved medieval precinct. Main landmarks include:

- The Tower of Frederick II, built by Frederick II in the 13th century on the summit of the hill at an elevation of 192 metres (630 ft), overlooking the entire Valdarno. Here was imprisoned his chancellor Pier delle Vigne until he committed suicide. During World War II it was destroyed by the German Army to prevent the Allies from using it as a gun sighting tower, but was reconstructed in 1958 by architect Renato Baldi.
- The Duomo (Cathedral), dedicated to both Sant'Assunta and Santo Genesio or Saint Genesius of Rome. It was originally a Romanesque building, but it has been remodelled several times and exhibits Gothic and some Renaissance architectural elements. The façade incorporates a number of colourful majolica bowls. The interior has a Latin cross plan, a central nave, and two side aisles. The cathedral's campanile, a fortification annexed in is called the Matilde Tower and features an asymmetrical clock.
- The Diocesan Museum, next to the cathedral. This museum-gallery contains works by Filippo Lippi, Jacopo Chimenti, Neri di Bicci, Fra Bartolomeo, Frederico Cardi (known as Cigoli) and Verrocchio.
- Palazzo dei Vicari, built by Emperor Otto IV during the 12th century, the palazzo incorporates one of the oldest known crenellated turrets. The interior has a number of interesting frescoes. It is now a hotel.
- Palazzo Comunale. This 14th-century building is still San Miniato's Town Hall. Its great hall was decorated by Cenno di Francesco Cenni. It also features a small oratory, containing a 16th-century altarpiece.
- The church of San Francesco. Originally built in the early 13th century with a Romanesque façade, its interior features Gothic style chapels and frescoes from the 14th and 15th centuries.
- The church of San Domenico was originally constructed in the 14th century, but has an incomplete façade. Its interior contains terracotta works by Luca della Robbia, a fresco attributed to Masolino da Panicale and a burial monument sculpted by Donatello. Next to the façade begins the Via Angelica, a tunnel that connected the countryside to the city.
- Convent of San Francesco. Purportedly founded by Saint Francis of Assisi himself in 1211 when he visited the city, the Convent stands behind the town, higher up on the hill.

Other buildings and monuments worth seeing include the Bishop's Sanctuary, with a Baroque façade in the design of an amphitheater, designed by Cigoli and the Sanctuary of the Crucifix, recently restored, the desanctified Chiesa di San Martino, which has done duty as a convent, and then a prison, but which will now be used for conventions.

There are also a number of Renaissance palazzi, built by such aristocratic families as the Roffia, Grifoni, Formichini and the Bonapartes, ancestors of Napoleon, among them Palazzo Grifoni.

== Transport ==
Train

San Miniato has a railway station on the Pisa-Florence line. Due to topography, the line lies on the flat plain to the north, around 4km from the town centre. A local bus links the station to the hilltop town.

Road

By road it is approximately 41 kilometres (25 miles) west of Florence and 55 kilometres (34 mi) east of Livorno on the SP 40 provincial road.

== Twin Towns ==
- Ouagadougou, Burkina Faso
- Silly, Belgium
- Villeneuve-lès-Avignon, France
- Bethlehem, Palestine
