= Michela Catena =

Italian footballer

Personal information
- Date of birth: 17 December 1999 (age 26)
- Place of birth: Ancona, Italy
- Height: 1.64 m (5 ft 5 in)
- Position: Midfielder

Team information
- Current team: Fiorentina

Michela Catena (born 17 December 1999) is an Italian footballer who plays as a midfielder for Fiorentina and the Italy national team. Catena started her career at Jesina Calcio.
