= Via Giuseppe Garibaldi (Genoa) =

Street in Genoa, Italy

Coordinates: 44°24′40″N 8°55′58″E

- Strada Maggiore o Strada Nuova
- Via Aurea, Via Garibaldi
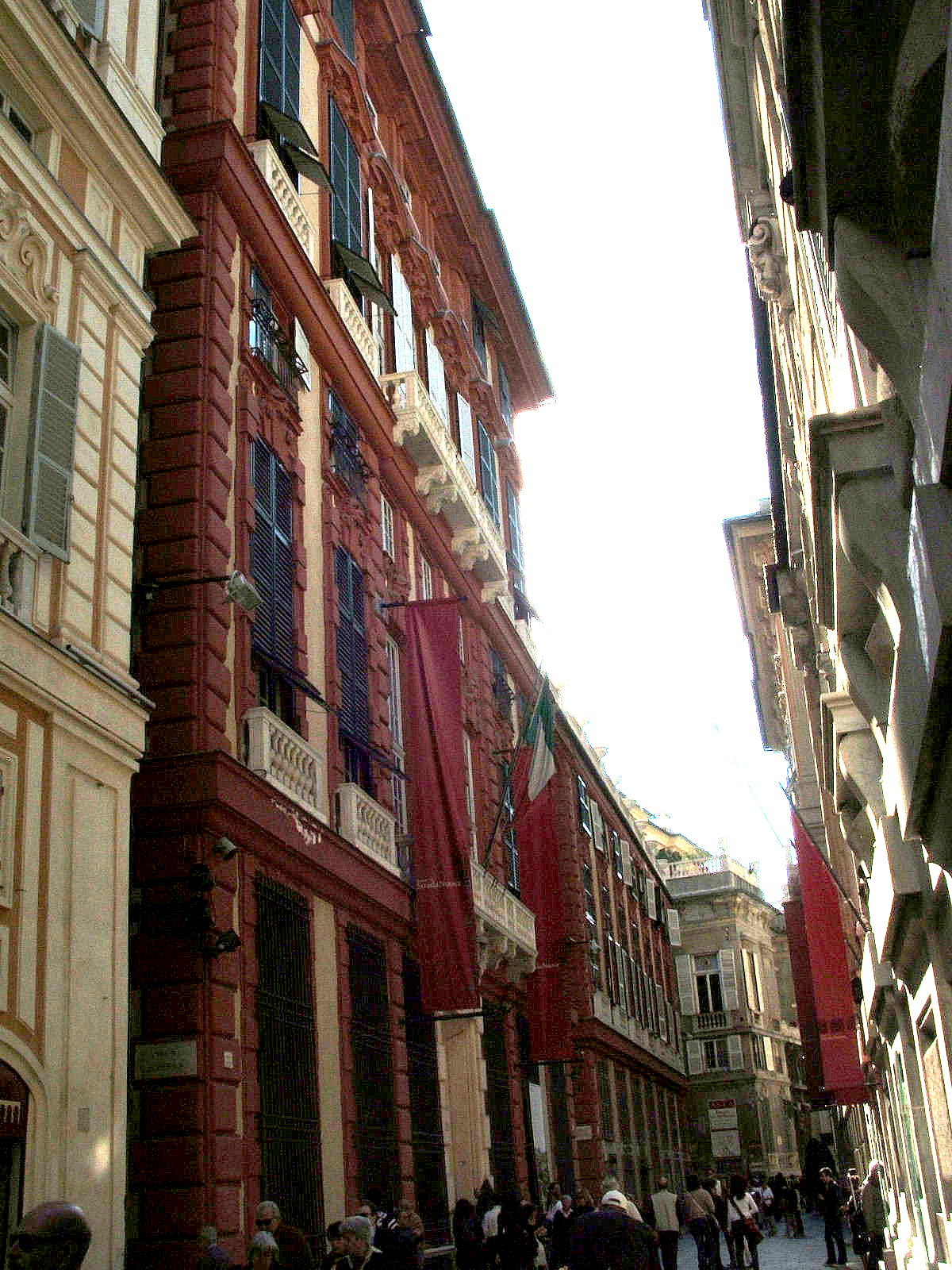
- View of Palazzo Rosso, one of the palaces of Via Garibaldi
- Interactive map of Via Giuseppe Garibaldi
- Location: Genoa, Italy
- Region: Liguria

UNESCO World Heritage Site
- Official name: Genoa: Le Strade Nuove and the system of the Palazzi dei Rolli
- Type: Cultural
- Region: Italy

Via Giuseppe Garibaldi is a street in the historical centre of Genoa, in Northwestern Italy, well known for its ancient palaces. It is one of the Strade Nuove (Italian for "new streets") built by the Genoese aristocracy during the Renaissance. Since July 2006 it is inscribed in the list of UNESCO World Heritage Site Genoa: the Strade Nuove and the system of the Palazzi dei Rolli.

== History ==
The street, sanctioned in 1550, was built in 1558–1583. Originally named Strada Maggiore or Strada Nuova, in 1882 it was dedicated to Giuseppe Garibaldi. The street is 250 metres long and 7.5 metres wide.

Between the first half of the 16th century and the first half of the 17th century, the nobility of the Republic of Genoa started a careful town planning to transform the existing medieval city and initiate a sizeable urban expansion to the North. The move to expand the antique palaces and to build new sumptuous ones was driven by the extraordinary wealth that came into the city through prosperous financing activities towards several European powers. In particular, the Genoese aristocracy financed the expensive undertakings of the Spanish Crown, such as the mercenary army that Spain kept in Flanders from 1566 to the peace of Westphalia in 1648. The ruling class of Genoa, mixing nobility of blood with new mercantile wealth, sought to underpin their prestige by the construction of grand city palaces and suburban villas of unusual splendor.

== Palaces listed as a UNESCO World Heritage Site ==
No. on the UNESCO list	Original Owner	Location	Current name of the Palace	Photo
8	Agostino Pallavicini	Via Giuseppe Garibaldi, 1, Genoa	Palazzo Cambiaso Pallavicini	
9	Pantaleo Spinola	Via Giuseppe Garibaldi, 2, Genoa	Palazzo Spinola Gambaro	
10	Franco Lercari	Via Giuseppe Garibaldi, 3, Genoa	Palazzo Lercari-Parodi	
11	Tobia Pallavicini	Via Giuseppe Garibaldi, 4, Genoa	Palazzo Carrega-Cataldi	
12	Angelo Giovanni Spinola	Via Giuseppe Garibaldi, 5, Genoa	Palazzo Angelo Giovanni Spinola	
13	Andrea and Gio. Battista Spinola	Via Giuseppe Garibaldi, 6, Genoa	Palazzo Doria (Genoa)	
14	Nicolosio Lomellino	Via Giuseppe Garibaldi, 7, Genoa	Palazzo Nicolosio Lomellino	
15	Lazzaro and Giacomo Spinola	Via Giuseppe Garibaldi, 8-10, Genoa	Palazzo Cattaneo-Adorno	
16	Nicolò Grimaldi	Via Giuseppe Garibaldi, 9, Genoa	Palazzo Doria Tursi (City Hall)	
17	Baldassarre Lomellini	via Giuseppe Garibaldi, 12, Genoa	Palazzo Campanella o di Baldassarre Lomellini	
18	Luca Grimaldi	Via Giuseppe Garibaldi, 11, Genoa	Palazzo Bianco	
19	Rodolfo and Francesco Brignole Sale	via Giuseppe Garibaldi, 18, Genoa	Palazzo Rosso (Genoa)	

== In literature ==
Charles Dickens gave a suggestive description of Strada Nuova in his travelogue Pictures from Italy.

...When shall I forget the Streets of Palaces: the Strada Nuova and the Strada Balbi! or how the former looked one summer day, when I first saw it underneath the brightest and most intensely blue of summer skies: which its narrow perspective of immense mansions, reduced to a tapering and most precious strip of brightness, looking down upon the heavy shade below! The endless details of these rich Palaces: the walls of some of them, within, alive with masterpieces by Vandyke! The great, heavy, stone balconies, one above another, and tier over tier: with here and there, one larger than the rest, towering high up—a huge marble platform; the doorless vestibules, massively barred lower windows, immense public staircases, thick marble pillars, strong dungeon-like arches, and dreary, dreaming, echoing vaulted chambers: among which the eye wanders again, and again, and again, as every palace is succeeded by another- the terrace gardens between house and house, with green arches of the vine, and groves of orange-trees, and blushing oleander in full bloom, twenty, thirty, forty feet above the street—the painted halls, mouldering, and blotting, and rotting in the damp corners, and still shining out in beautiful colours and voluptuous designs...

== Gallery ==
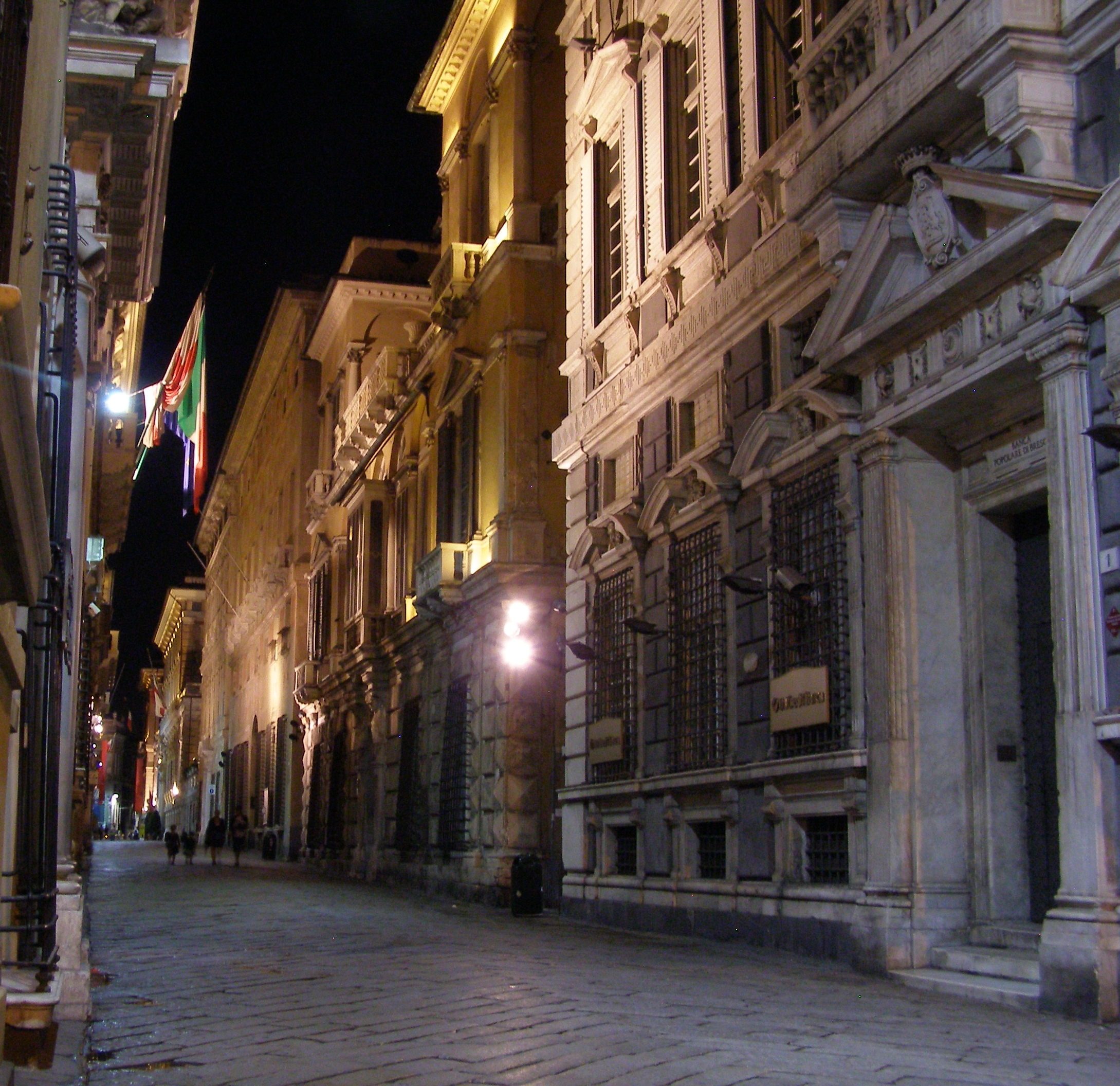
Genoa, via Garibaldi.

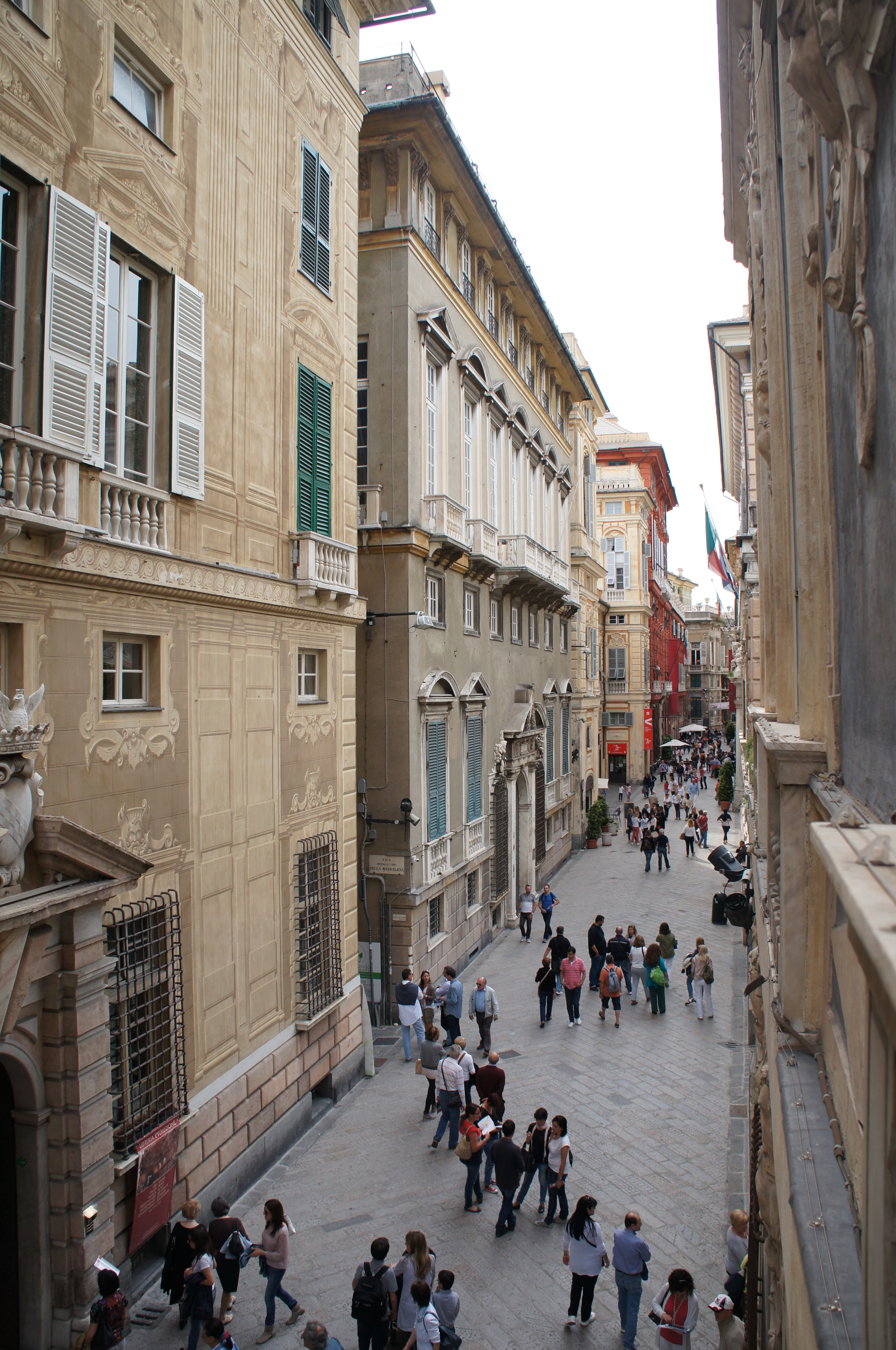
Genoa, via Garibaldi.

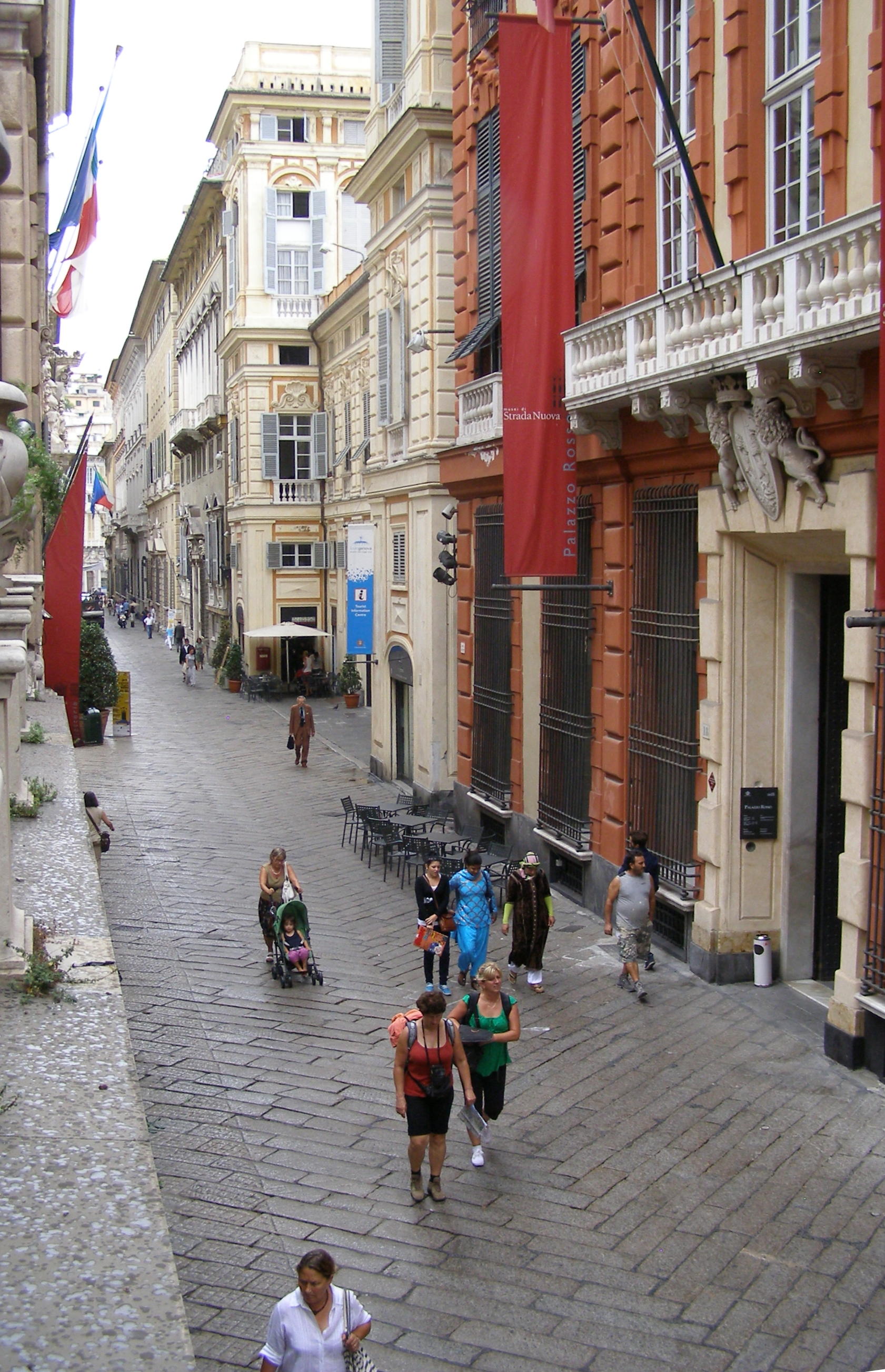
Genoa, via Garibaldi.

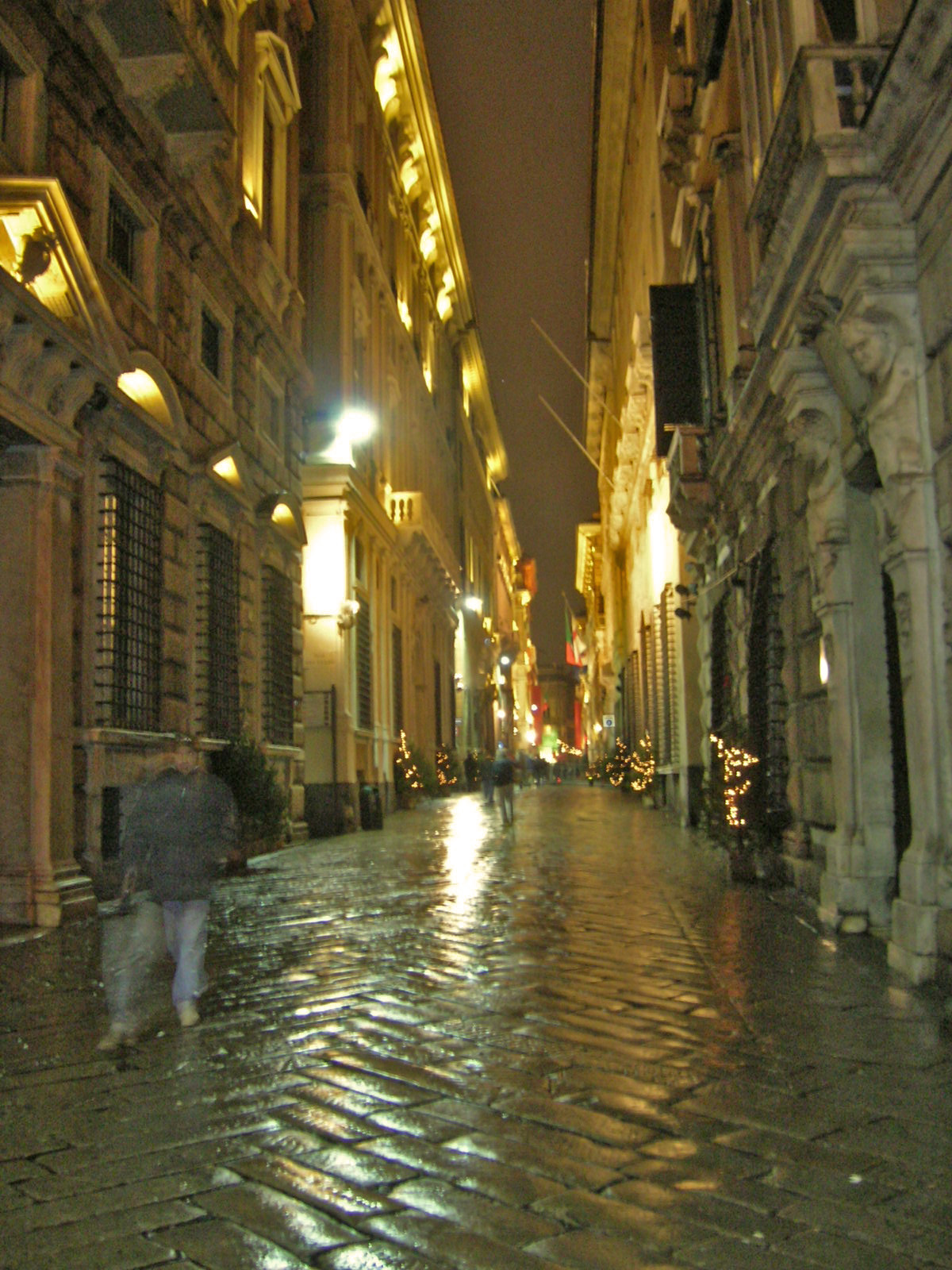
Genoa, via Garibaldi.

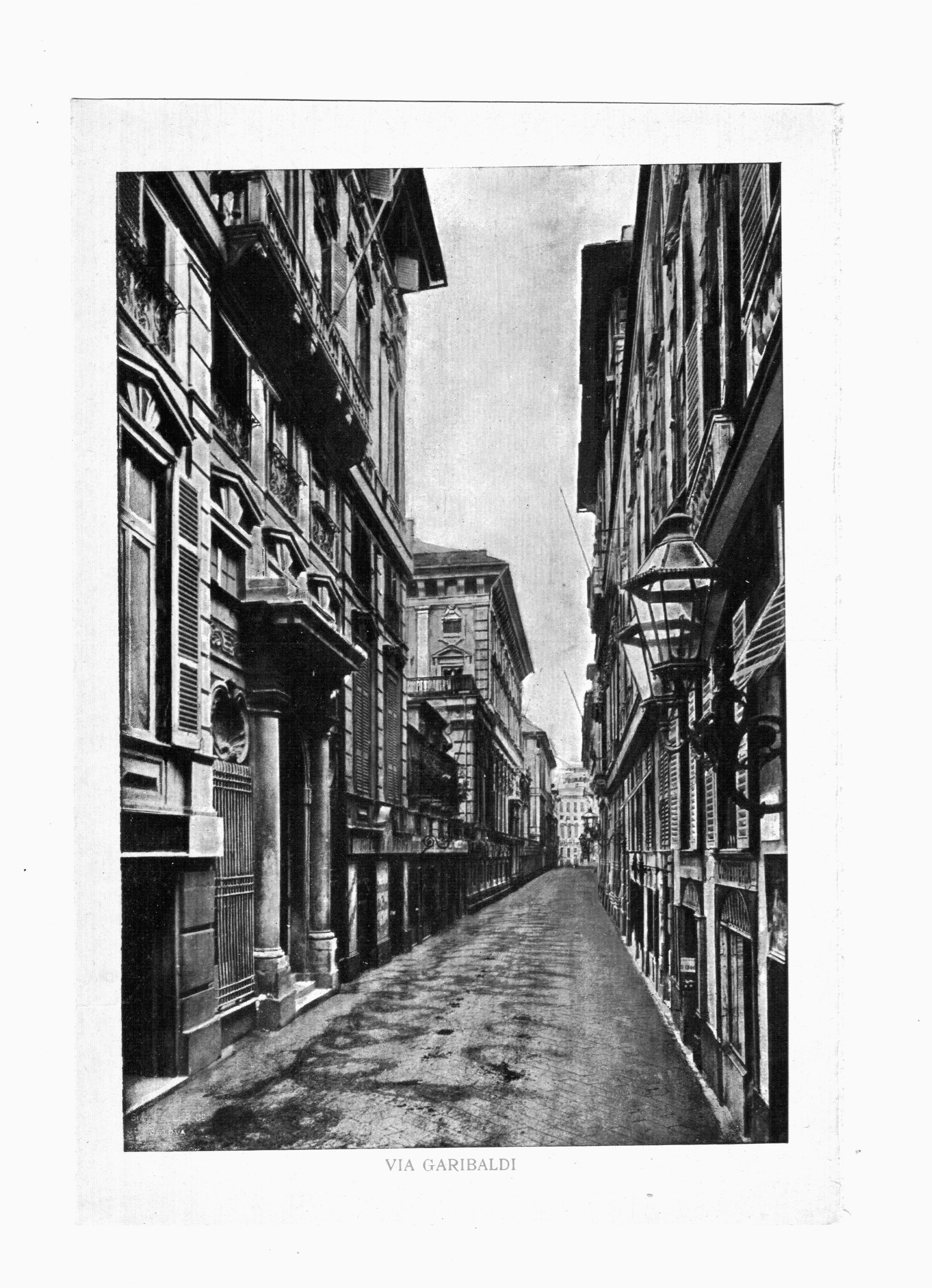
Genoa, via Garibaldi.

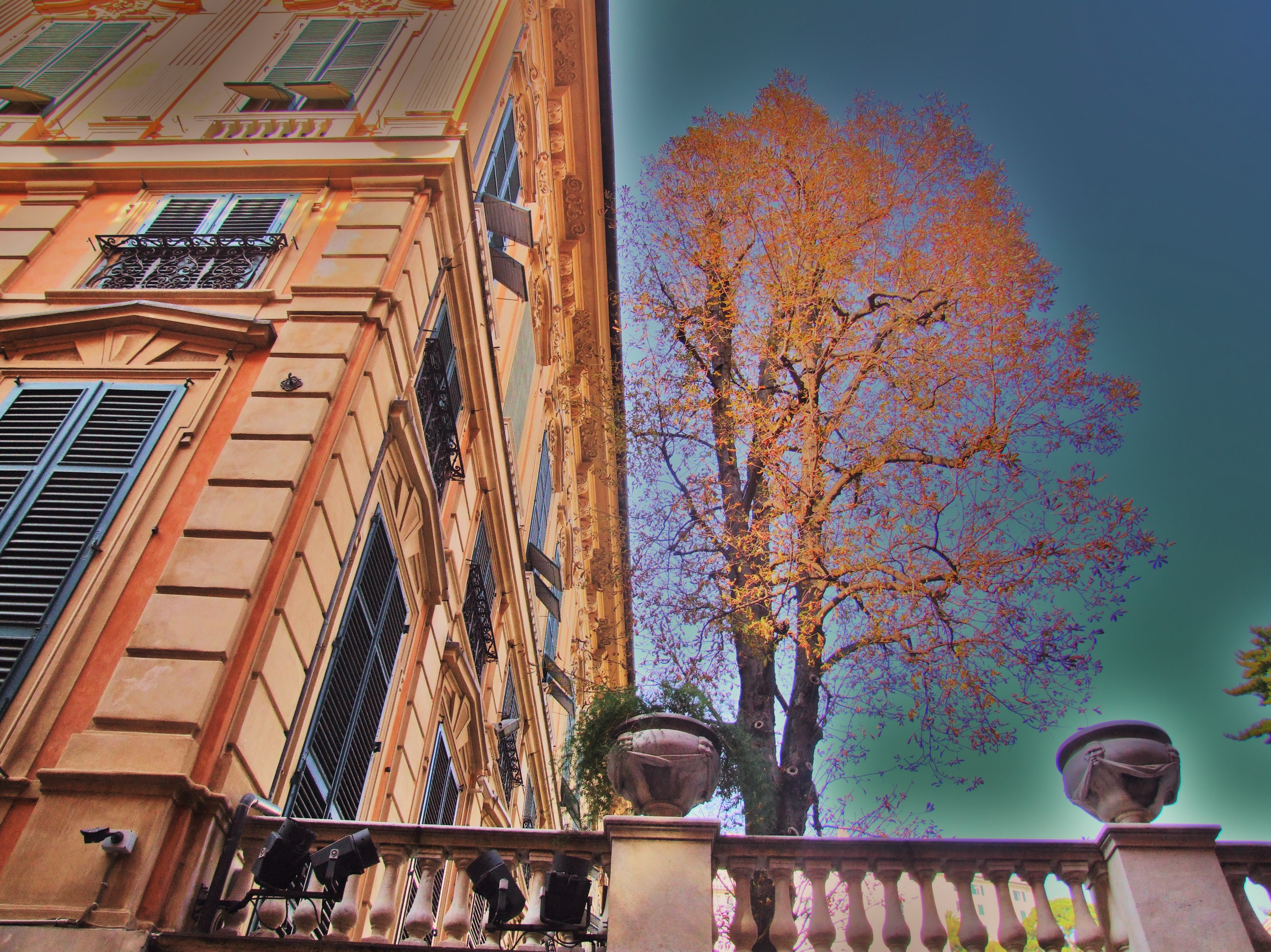
Genoa, via Garibaldi.

== See also ==
- Genoa: The Strade Nuove and the system of the Palazzi dei Rolli
- Via Balbi
- Via Cairoli (Genoa)
- Republic of Genoa
- Genoa

== Bibliography ==
- Fiorella Caraceni (1992), Una strada rinascimentale: via Garibaldi a Genova, Genova, SAGEP
- Giorgio Doria (1995), Nobiltà e investimenti a Genova in Età moderna, Genova
- Gioconda Pomella (2007), Guida Completa ai Palazzi dei Rolli Genova, Genova, De Ferrari Editore(ISBN 9788871728155)
- Mauro Quercioli (2008), I Palazzi dei Rolli di Genova, Roma, Libreria dello Stato (ISBN 9788824011433)
- Fiorella Caraceni Poleggi (2001), Palazzi Antichi e Moderni di Genova raccolti e disegnati da Pietro Paolo Rubens (1652), Genova, Tormena Editore (ISBN 9788884801302)
- Mario Labò (2003), I palazzi di Genova di P.P. Rubens, Genova, Nuova Editrice Genovese
