= Palazzo Cattaneo-Adorno =

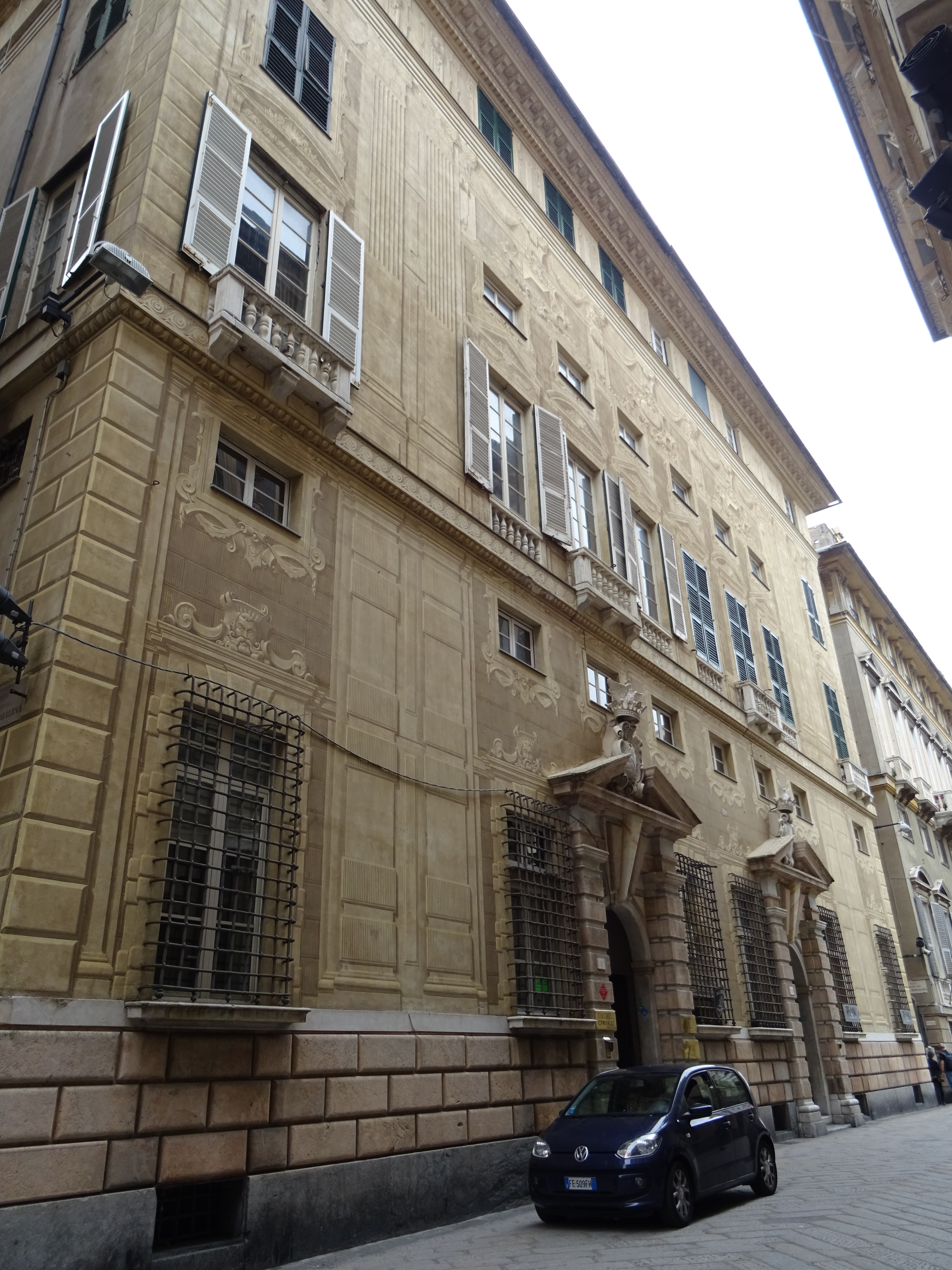
- Facade of the Palazzo Cattaneo-Adorno in via Garibaldi 8–10
- Interactive map of the Palazzo Cattaneo-Adorno area
- Alternative names: Palazzo Lazzaro e Giacomo Spinola

General information
- Status: In use
- Type: Palace
- Architectural style: Mannerist
- Location: Genoa, Italy, 8–10, Via Garibaldi
- Coordinates: 44.4109°N 8.93328°E
- Construction started: 1583
- Completed: 1588

UNESCO World Heritage Site
- Part of: Genoa: Le Strade Nuove and the system of the Palazzi dei Rolli
- Criteria: Cultural: (ii)(iv)
- Reference: 1211
- Inscription: 2006 (30th Session)

The palazzo Cattaneo-Adorno or palazzo Lazzaro e Giacomo Spinola is a building on via Garibaldi, in the historical centre of Genoa, marked by house numbers 8 and 10, included on 13 July 2006 in the list of 42 palaces inscribed in the Rolli di Genova, which became World Heritage by UNESCO on that date. It houses a remarkable cycle of Baroque frescoes by Lazzaro Tavarone.

== History ==
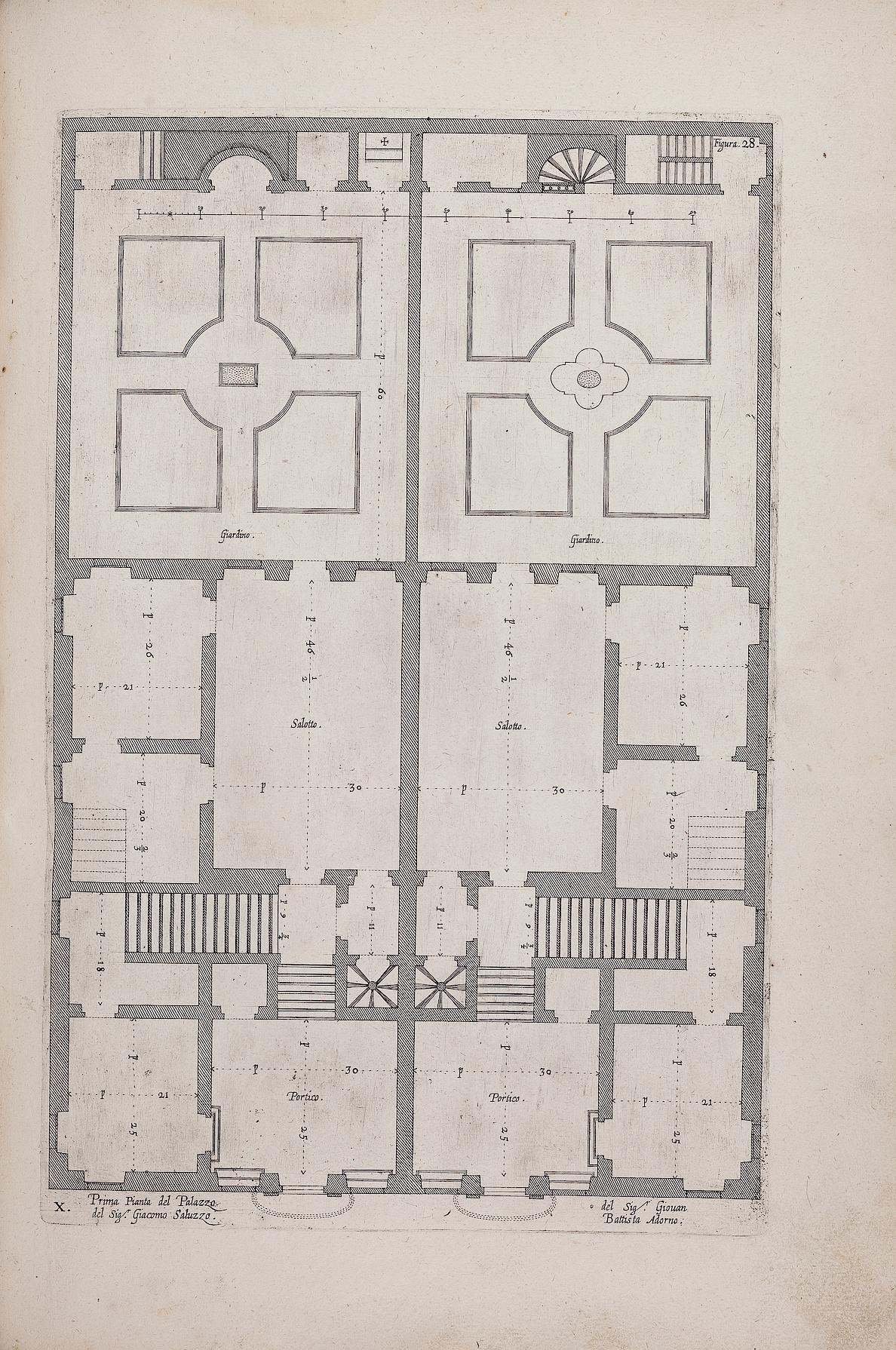
Rubens, Palazzi di Genova, plan of the two symmetrical mansions

The cousins Lazzaro and Giacomo Spinola (from Luccoli) had the palace built between 1583 and 1588. The attribution of two distinct house numbers is due to the fact that the palace, although it consists of a single building, is made up of two distinct and symmetrical dwellings, a feature that makes it unique among the palaces of Strada Nuova. The absolute symmetry conceived by the unknown architect who oversaw its construction characterises both the facades, the floor plan and the gardens, as can be seen in the surveys made by Rubens for the 1622 edition of the Palazzi di Genova. The uniqueness of the double construction is still highlighted by the presence of the two identical portals facing the street.

In 1609, the western part (no. 10) was given to Filippo Adorno. The Adorno family, whose descendants retained ownership until the 20th century, commissioned the interior decoration. In particular, it was Giovanni Battista Adorno (1566—1638), brother of the purchaser, who commissioned Lazzaro Tavarone to paint the famous cycle of frescoes in the 1520s, with the subject of the exploits of the Adorno family. From his marriage to Paola Spinola was born Paolina Adorno (1610—1648), wife of Anton Giulio Brignole Sale, immortalised in the famous portrait by Van Dyck now in Palazzo Rosso.

The eastern residence (no. 8), on the other hand, experienced more changes of ownership. Belonging to the Saluzzo family from the 17th to the mid-19th century, it then passed to the Scassi, then to the Cattaneo. Following the merger of the Cattaneo and Adorno families, with the marriage of Luigi Cattaneo and Viola Adorno, the palazzo took its present name.

== Description ==
More modest is the decoration of the east wing, which features 16th-century frescoes by Giovanni Andrea Ansaldo (1584—1638) with Stories of Cupid and Psyche.

Inside the west wing at number 10, the frescoed decoration, dated 1624 and the work of Lazzaro Tavarone, celebrates on the Vault of the atrium a war feat of Antoniotto Adorno, the owners' ancestor doge. In another room on the ground floor, the Conquest of Jerusalem, is celebrated with William Embriacus expels Jerusalem, the Delivery of the Baptist's Ashes, the Gift of the Holy Basin, surrounded by Allegorical Figures. In the room on the piano nobile, also by Lazzaro Tavarone, is the fresco depicting the Deeds of Doge Antoniotto Adorno for the liberation of Pope Urban VI besieged by Charles III, King of Naples at Nocera (1385). Other rooms present encomiastic subjects (Raffaele Adorno conquers the island of Gerba in 1388) biblical (Announcement of the angel to Hagar and Ishmael, Stories of Daniel) and mythological (Cupid blindfolded).

In other living rooms under vaults frescoed with mythological subjects, precious furniture and knick-knacks are preserved, as well as part of the rich and well-known picture gallery comprising remarkable paintings between the XVI and the 17th century.

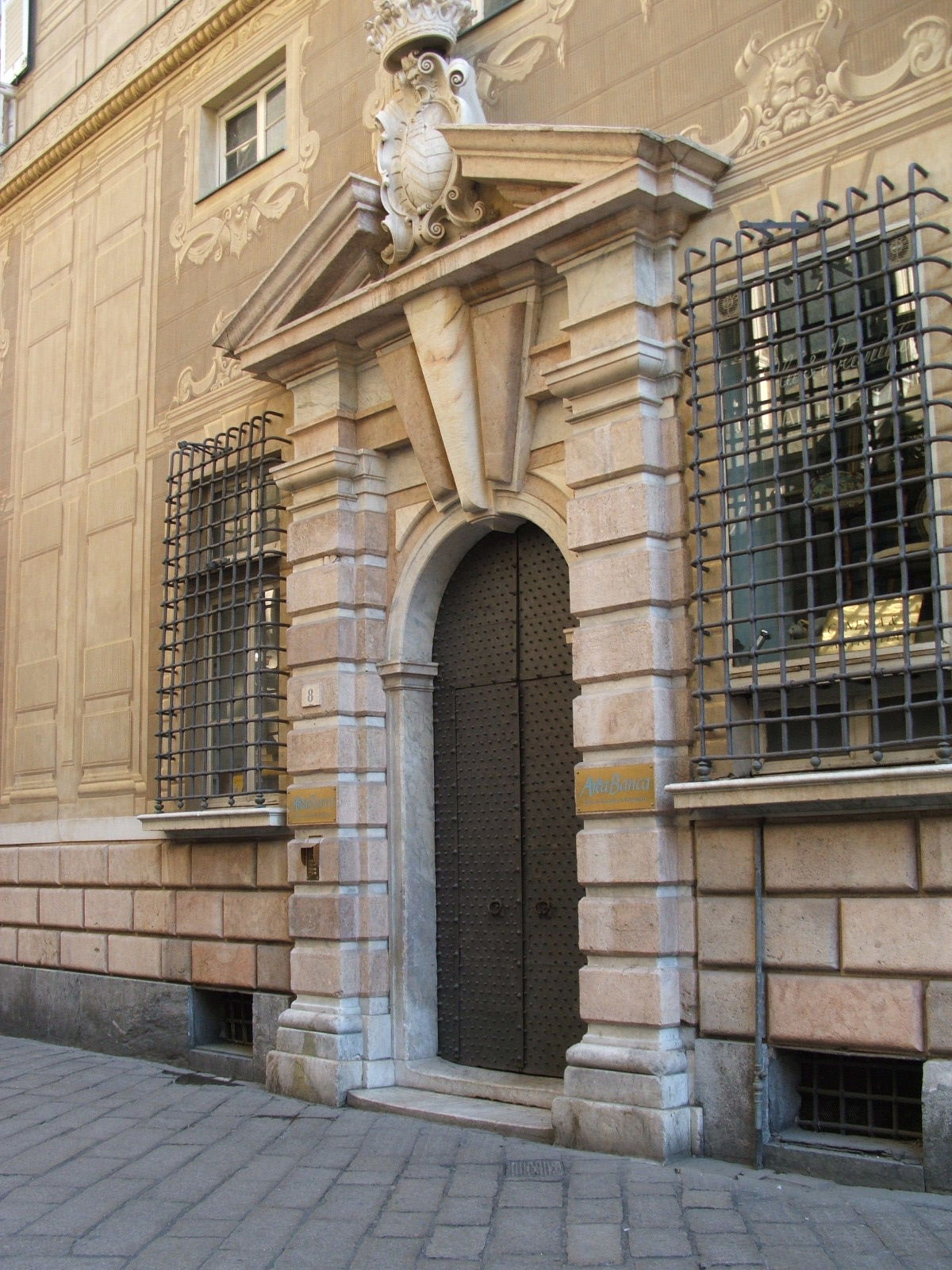
Particular of one of the two portals of the palace

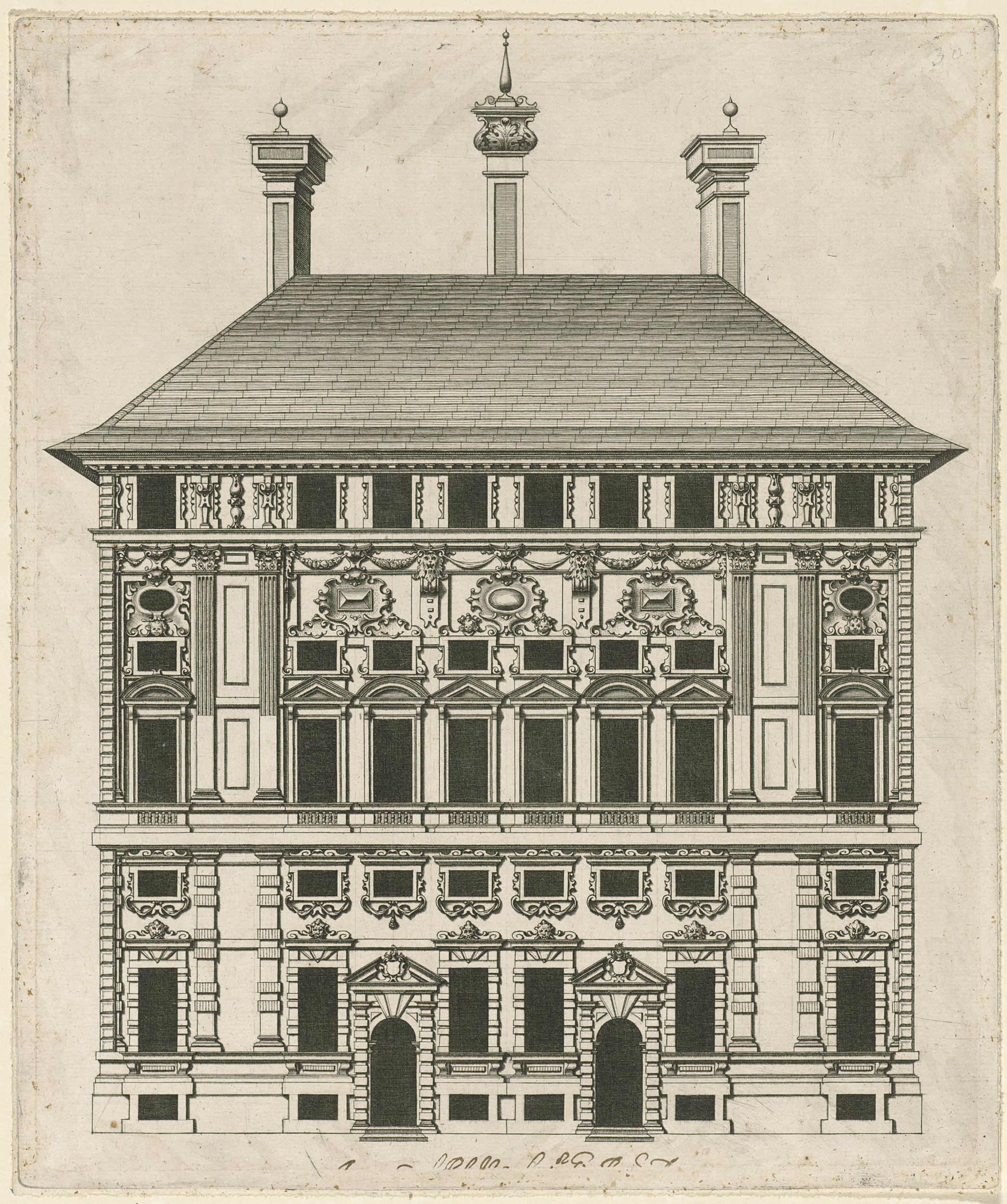
Rubens, Palaces of Genoa

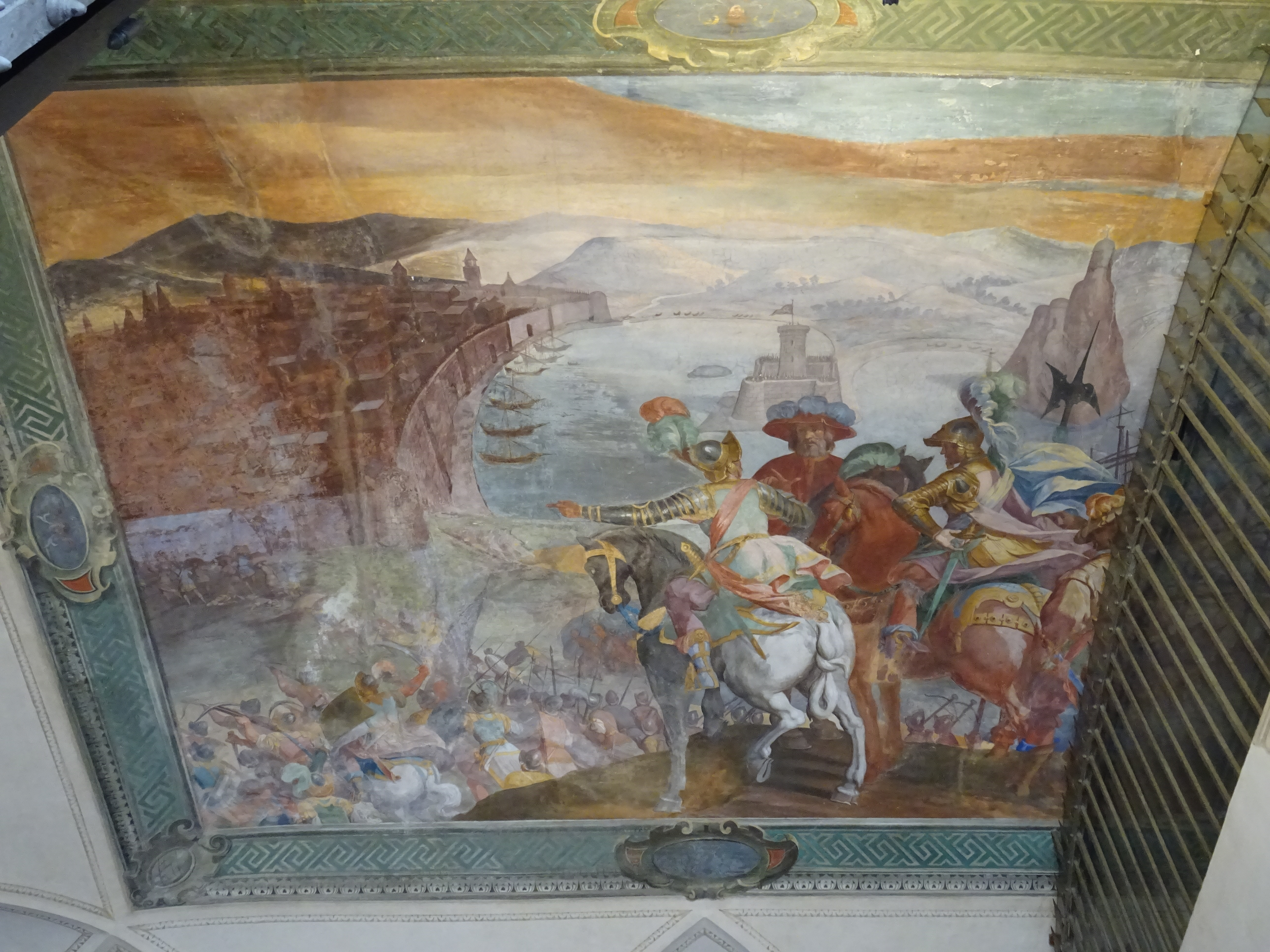
Raffaele Adorno besieges the city of Tunis, Lazzaro Tavarone, 1624

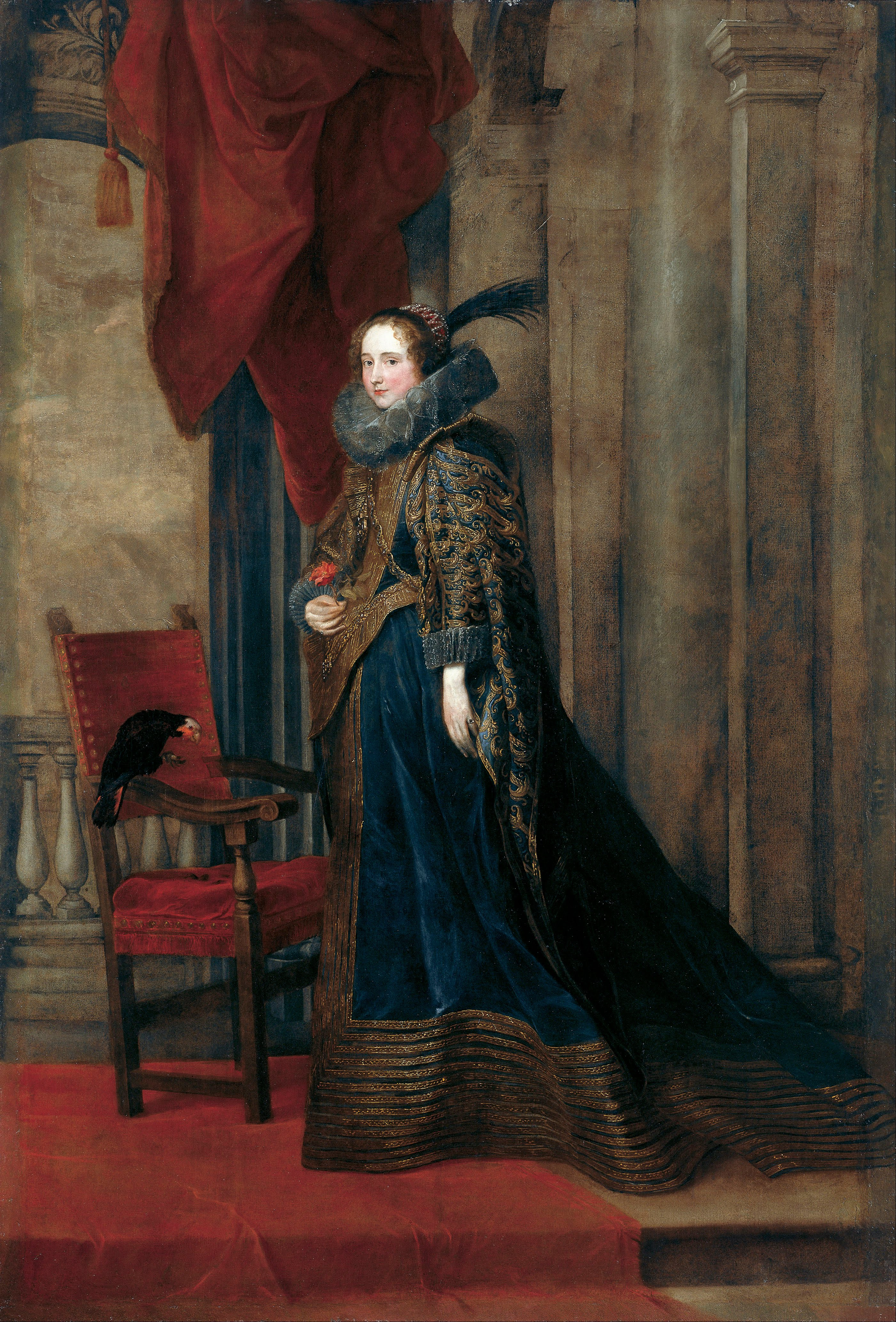
Anthony van Dyck, Portrait of Paolina Adorno Brignole-Sale

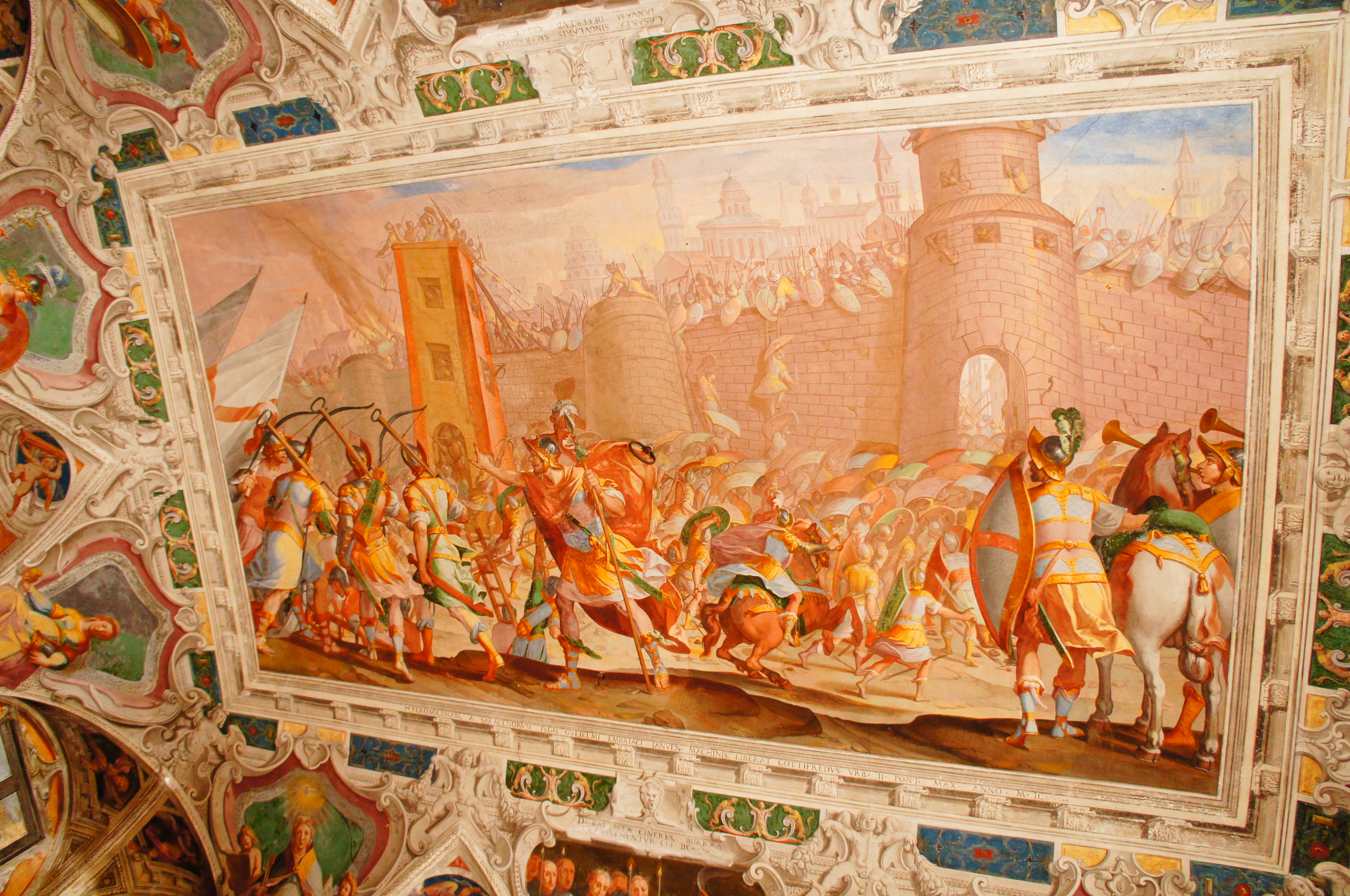
Fresco by Lazzaro Tavarone, depicting the storming of Jerusalem

== Sources ==
=== Italian sources ===
- E. Poleggi, Genova. Una civiltà di Palazzi, Cinisello Balsamo (Milano) 2002, pp. 114–116 (Palazzo di Lazzaro e Giacomo Spinola (1583))
- E. Poleggi, L’invenzione dei Rolli, catalogo della mostra, Genova 2004.
- Alizeri Federico, (Attribuito a) Manuale del forestiere per la città di Genova, Genova, 1846 pag. 282–285
- Alizeri Federico, Guida illustrativa del cittadino e del forastiero per la città di Genova e sue adiacenze, Bologna, Forni Editore, 1972 pag. 185–189
- Poleggi Ennio e Poleggi Fiorella (Presentazione, ricerca iconografica e note a cura di), Descrizione della città di Genova da un anonimo del 1818, Genova, Sagep, 1969 pag. 153
- Ratti Carlo Giuseppe, Istruzione di quanto può vedersi di più bello in Genova in pittura scultura et architettura autore Carlo Giuseppe Ratti pittor genovese, Genova, Ivone Gravier, 1780, pag. 272–273
- Spotorno Giovanni Battista, Descrizione di Genova e del Genovesato, Vol. III, Genova, Ferrando, 1846, pag. 291
