= Palazzo Cambiaso Pallavicini =

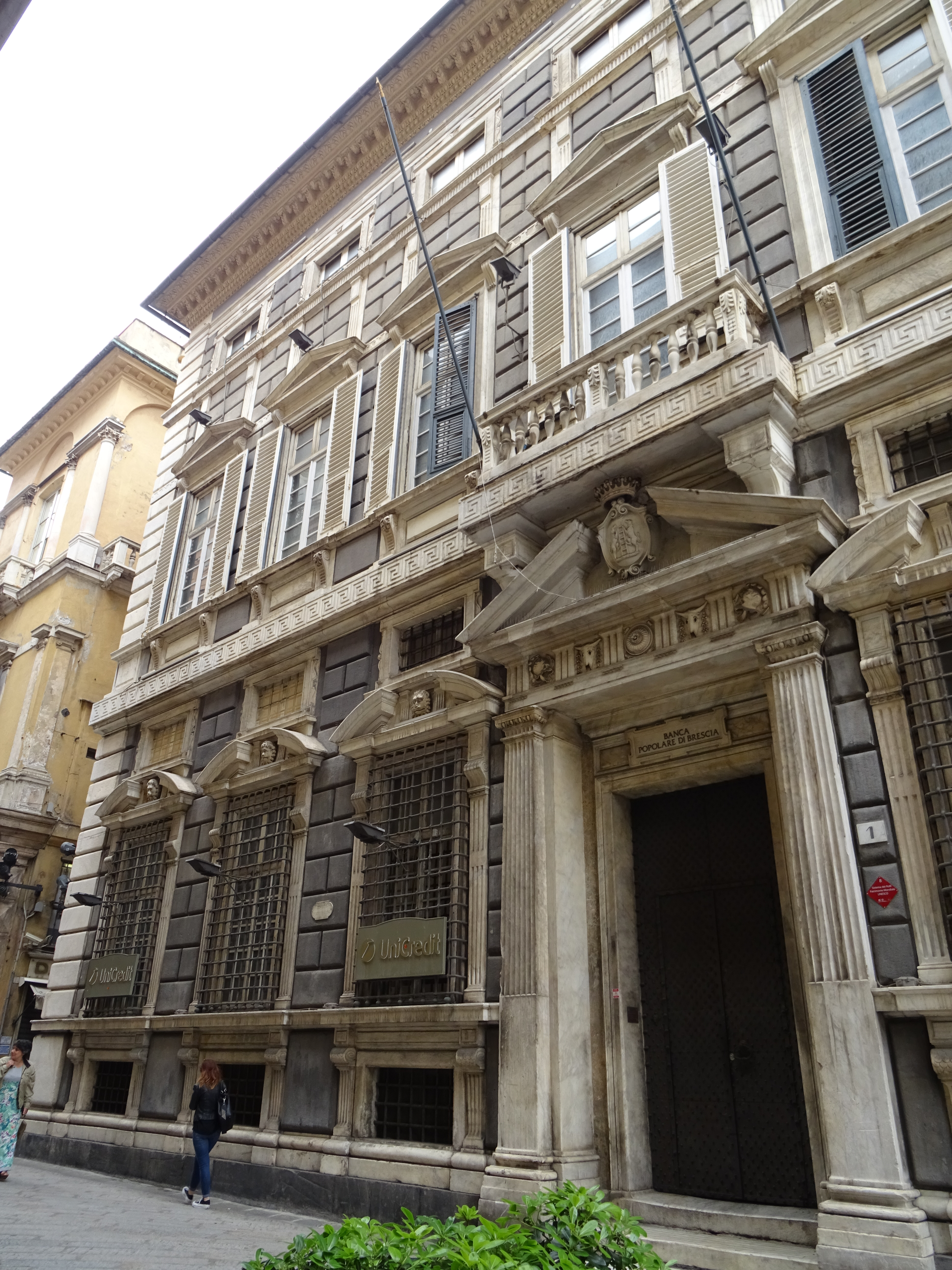
- Facade of the Palazzo Nicolosio Lomellino in via Garibaldi 1
- Interactive map of the Palazzo Cambiaso Pallavicini area
- Alternative names: Palazzo Agostino Pallavicini

General information
- Status: In use
- Type: Palace
- Architectural style: Mannerist
- Location: Genoa, Italy, 1, Via Garibaldi
- Coordinates: 44.410908°N 8.934753°E
- Current tenants: offices
- Construction started: 1558
- Completed: 1558

Design and construction
- Architect: Bernardino Cantone

UNESCO World Heritage Site
- Part of: Genoa: Le Strade Nuove and the system of the Palazzi dei Rolli
- Criteria: Cultural: (ii)(iv)
- Reference: 1211
- Inscription: 2006 (30th Session)

The palazzo Pallavicini-Cambiaso or palazzo Agostino Pallavicini is a building located in via Garibaldi at number 1 in the historical centre of Genoa, included on 13 July 2006 in the list of the 42 palaces inscribed in the Rolli di Genova that became World Heritage by UNESCO on that date.

== History and description ==
Originally built from 1558, on behalf of Agostino Pallavicini (+1575), ambassador to the court of Spain, brother of Tobia Pallavicino, who in the same years commissioned the palace at no. 4 Via Garibaldi, today known as Palazzo Tobia Pallavicino. Among Agostino's sons, of particular importance was Niccolò Pallavicini (1562—1619), who hosted Rubens during his stay in Genoa, and commissioned from him some of the major masterpieces of the Genoese period, including his own portrait and the famous portrait of Maria Serra Pallavicini, his wife. The palace, included in Rubens' edition of Palaces of Genoa of 1622, passed into the ownership of the Cambiaso family around the middle of the Eighteenth century.

The designer was Bernardino Cantone, a collaborator of Galeazzo Alessi in the arrangement of Piazza delle Fontane Marose and the opening of Strada Nuova.

The façade of the building, which is very elegant, has an ashlar facing of grey stone that sets off the white marble of the plinths, in which an 18th-century votive aedicule is well framed. The portal is decorated with a bucrania frieze in Mannerist style.

Among the outstanding features of the building – relatively modest in size but enhanced by its direct location on the street and the nearby Piazza delle Fontane Marose – are the Rape of the Sabine Women scene in the drawing room on the piano nobile and the Story of Cupid and Psyche in the great hall, both painted by the Genoese painters Andrea and Ottavio Semino.

A curiosity: the building, immediately registered in the Rolli of Genoa, underwent a downgrade — from the Rollo of 1577 to that of 1588 — from the first to the second category, to return to the first with the next Rollo, the third, that of 1599, and from then on to remain in all subsequent ones.

The building, located at No. 1 on the street, is currently owned by a well-known banking institution.

== Picture Gallery ==
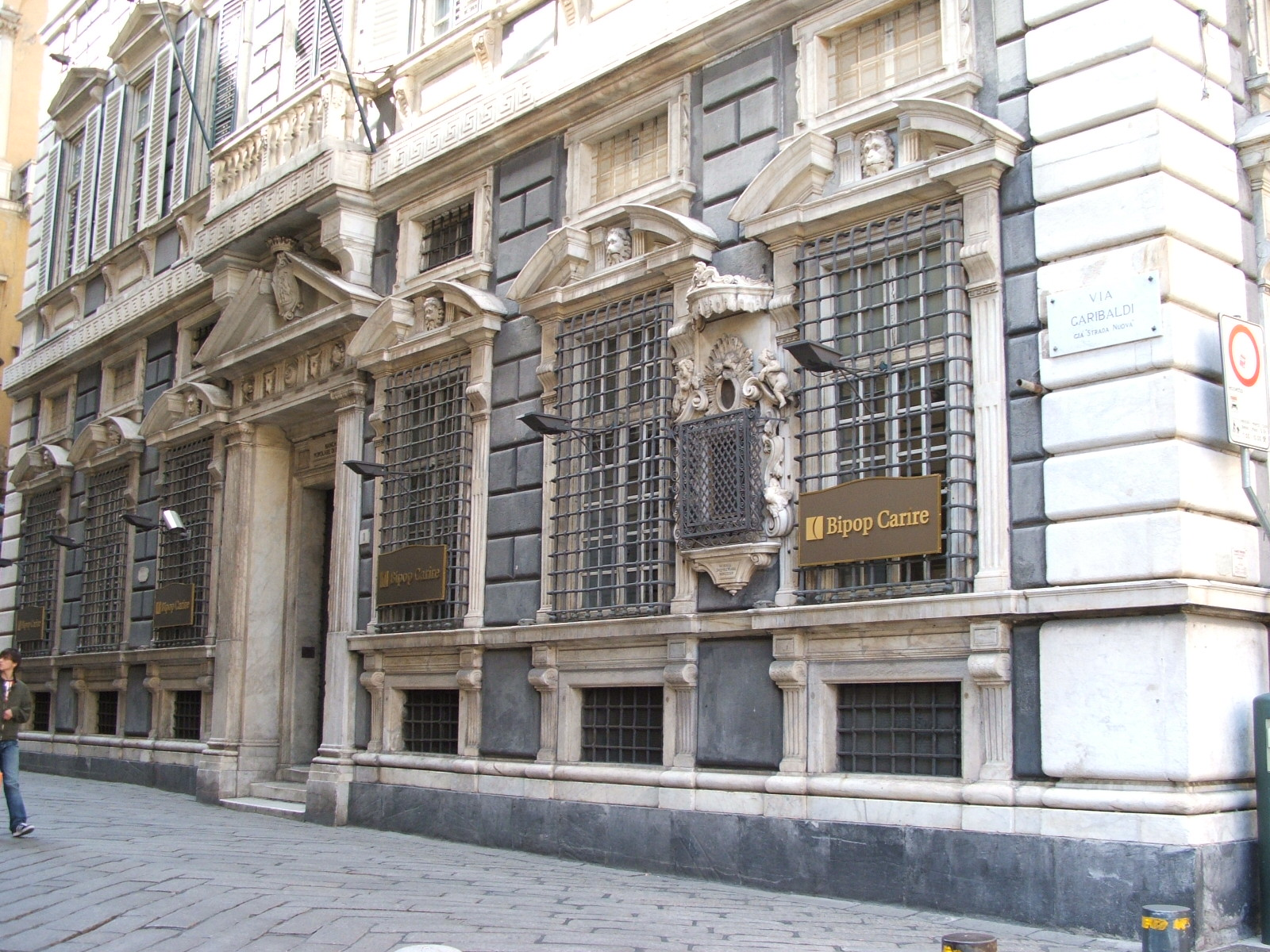
Palazzo Palalvicini-Cambiaso

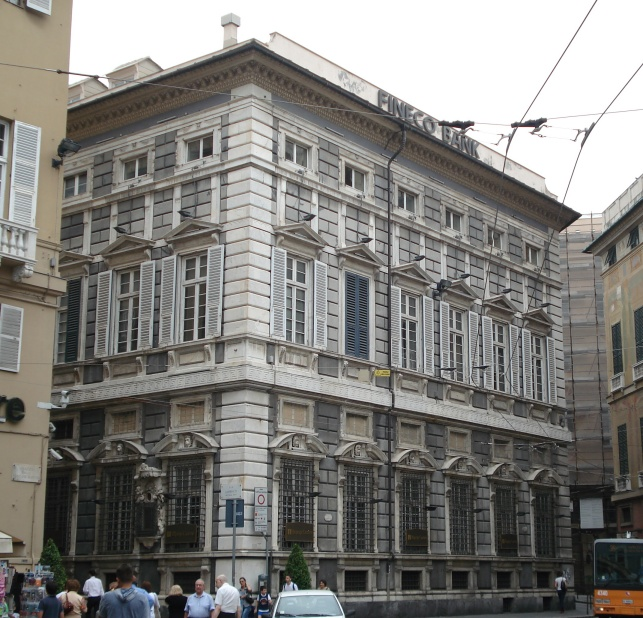
The palace seen from Piazza Fontane Marose

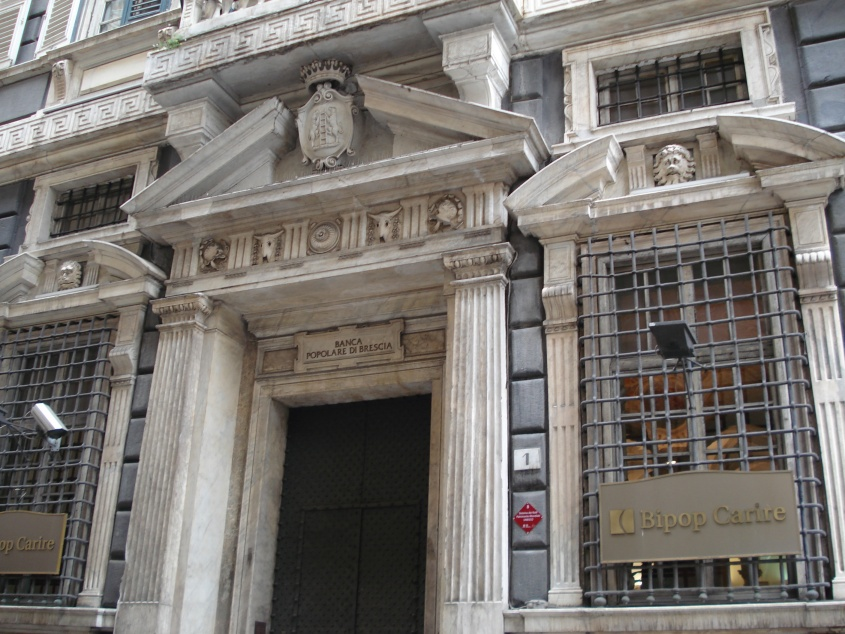
Particular of the portal

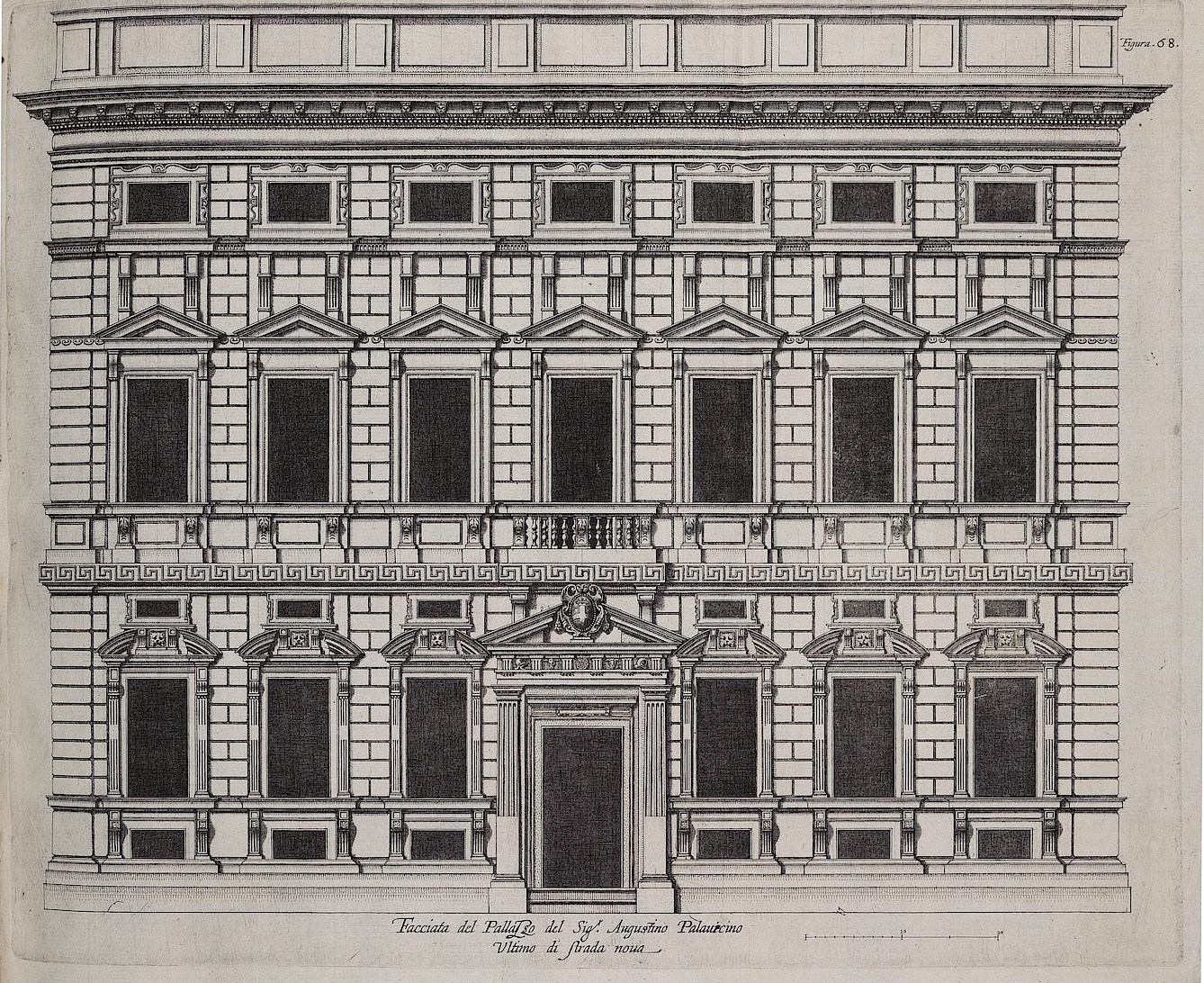
P. Rubens, Palazzi di Genova, Antwerp - 1622

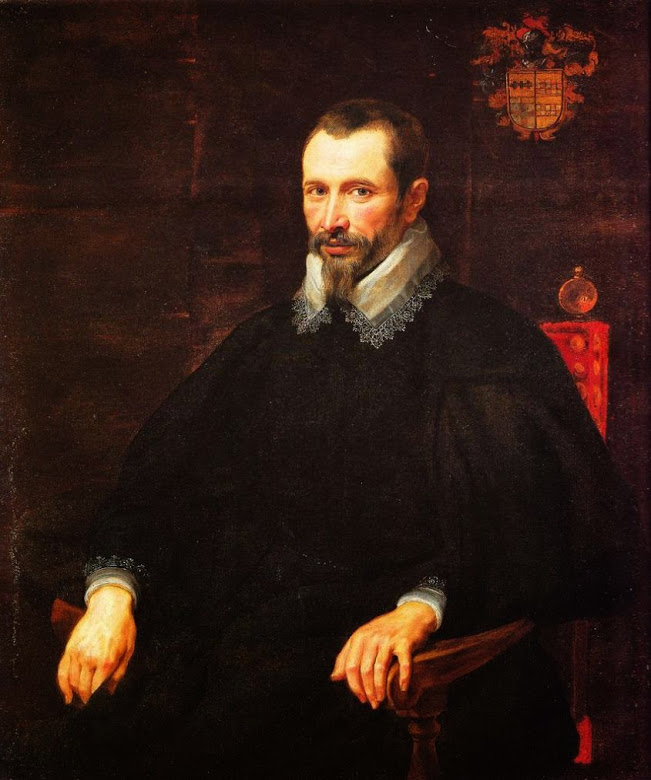
Pieter Paul Rubens, Portrait of Niccolò Pallavicini, 1604

== Sources ==
=== Italian sources ===
- E. Poleggi, Genova una civiltà di palazzi, Cinisello Balsamo (Milano) 2002, pp. 62–63 (Palazzo di Agostino Pallavicino (1558)).
- E. Poleggi, L’invenzione dei Rolli, catalogo della mostra, Genova 2004.
