= Palazzo Doria (Genoa) =

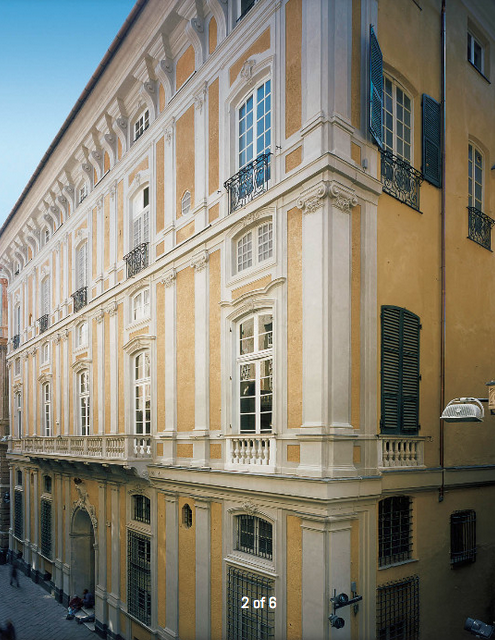
- Facade of the Palazzo Doria in via Garibaldi 6
- Interactive map of the Palazzo Doria area
- Alternative names: Palazzo Andrea e Gio. Batta Spinola

General information
- Status: Intact
- Type: Palace
- Architectural style: Mannerist
- Location: Genoa, Italy, 6, Via Garibaldi
- Coordinates: 44.4109556°N 8.933705°E
- Named for: Doria family
- Construction started: 1563
- Renovated: 1684

Design and construction
- Architects: Bernardino Cantone, Giovan Battista Castello, Gio. Antonio Ricca

UNESCO World Heritage Site
- Part of: Genoa: Le Strade Nuove and the system of the Palazzi dei Rolli
- Criteria: Cultural: (ii)(iv)
- Reference: 1211
- Inscription: 2006 (30th Session)

The Palazzo Doria or Palazzo Andrea e Gio. Batta Spinola is a palace located in Via Garibaldi, in the historical center of Genoa, in Northwestern Italy. It was one of the 163 Palazzi dei Rolli of Genoa, the selected private residences where the notable guests of the Republic of Genoa were hosted during State visits. On 13 luglio del 2006 it was included in the list of 42 palaces which now form the UNESCO World Heritage Site Genoa: Le Strade Nuove and the system of the Palazzi dei Rolli.

The palace is the property of the Doria family and has a residential use. Only the exterior and limited internal areas are open to the public.

== The Rolli of Genoa ==
The Rolli di Genova - or, more precisely, the Rolli degli alloggiamenti pubblici di Genova (Italian for "Lists of the public lodgings of Genoa") were the official lists at the time of Republic of Genoa of the private palaces and mansions, belonging to the most distinguished Genoese families, which - if chosen through a public lottery - were obliged to host on behalf of the Government the most notable visitors during their State visit to the Republic. Later, these palaces hosted many famous visitors to Genoa during their Grand Tour, a cultural itinerary around Italy

== History ==
The ground where the palace is located was purchased in an auction in 1551 by Constantino Gentile, who later sold it for double the price to the brothers Giambattista and Andrea Spinola, who commissioned the construction of the palace in 1563. In 1566, Andrea passed his share of ownership to his brother Giambattista and the construction continued at a high pace, so that in 1567 the construction was almost completed.

Up to recently, Giovan Battista Castello was believed to be the main architect. In 1968, however, Bernardino Cantone was documented as chief architect and building master of the palace. Today its construction is primarily attributed to Cantone, while the fireplace on the piano nobile and the courtyard remain attributed to Castello. The piano nobile features the fresco Legate of Obertus Spinola to Frederik I Barbarossa by Andrea Semino and frescoes by Luca Cambiasi.

Palazzo Doria was the only palace in Strada Nuova to be seriously damaged by the French naval bombing in 1684, which required a serious renovation, completed by architect Gio. Antonio Ricca with the adding of a story and the redesign of the façade. However, the 17th-century restoration did not alter the original sequence of atrium, courtyard and garden planned by Castello.

The palace was purchased by Gio. Batta Spinola, then it passed to the Doria family in 1723. The Dorias did not see the need for a refurbishing of the palace, beyond routine repairs and the addition of a notable lantern in the atrium with the coat of arms of the Doria family.

== See also ==
- Genoa: Le Strade Nuove and the system of the Palazzi dei Rolli
- Doria (family)
- House of Spinola
- Genoa
- Via Garibaldi (Genoa)

== Bibliography ==
- Gioconda Pomella (2007), Guida Completa ai Palazzi dei Rolli Genova. Genova: De Ferrari Editore (ISBN 9788871728155)
- Mauro Quercioli (2008), I Palazzi dei Rolli di Genova. Roma: Libreria dello Stato (ISBN 9788824011433)
- Fiorella Caraceni Poleggi (2001), Palazzi Antichi e Moderni di Genova raccolti e disegnati da Pietro Paolo Rubens (1652), Genova, Tormena Editore (ISBN 9788884801302)
- Mario Labò (2003), I palazzi di Genova di P.P. Rubens. Genova, Nuova Editrice Genovese
- Ennio Poleggi (1968), Strada Nuova: una lottizzazione del Cinquecento a Genova. Genova: SAGEP Editrice.
- Ennio Poleggi (2008), Genova Le Strade Nuove e il sistema dei Palazzi dei Rolli. Genova: SAGEP Editrice (ISBN 9788870589962).

== Gallery ==
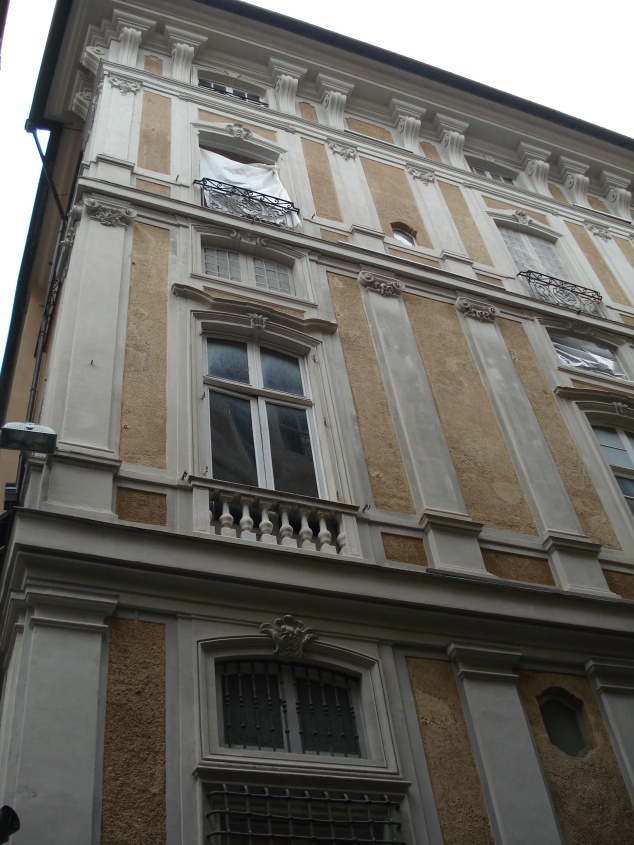
Palazzo Doria, or Gio. Battista Spinola, Genoa. Facade on via Garibaldi

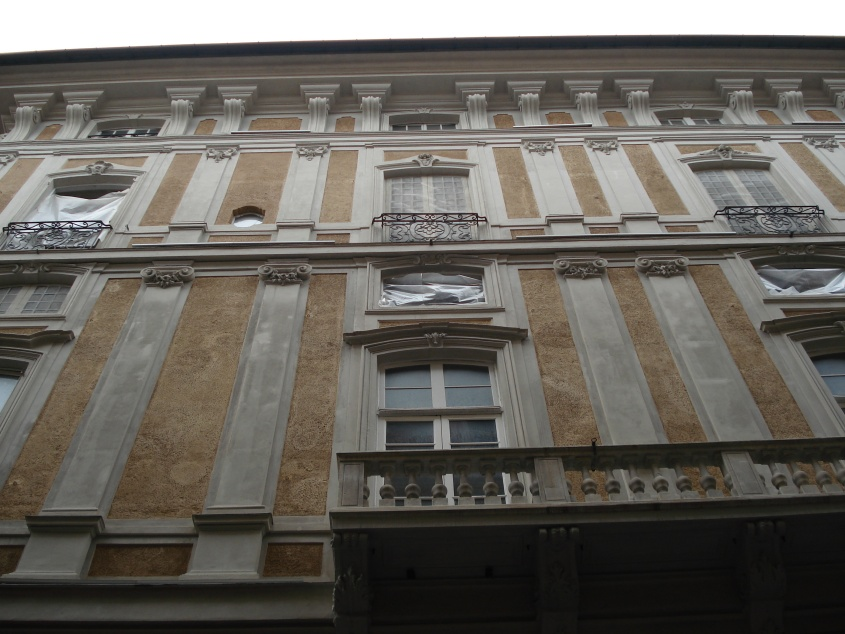
Palazzo Doria, gia Gio. Battista Spinola, Genova. Facciata su via Garibaldi

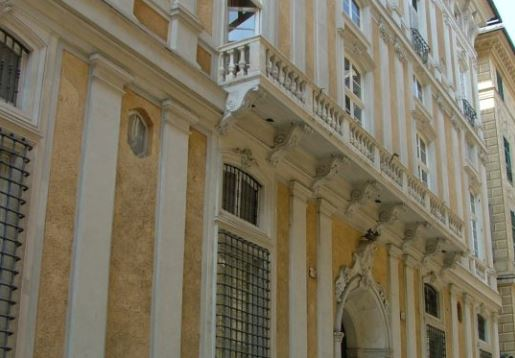
Palazzo Doria, gia Gio. Battista Spinola, Genova. Facciata su via Garibaldi

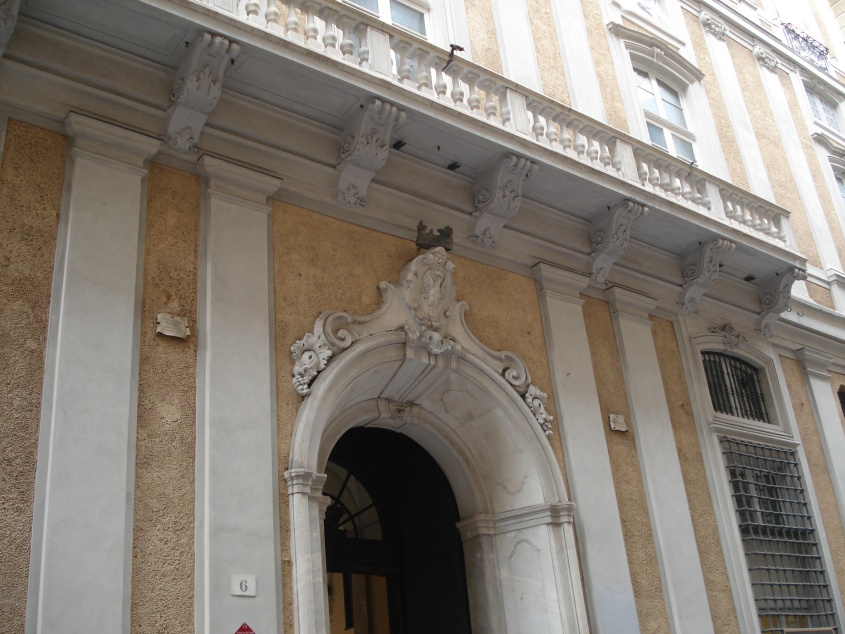
Palazzo Doria, gia Gio. Battista Spinola, Genova. Facciata su via Garibaldi. Portal

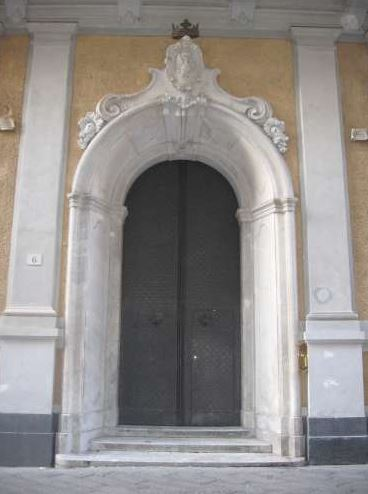
Palazzo Doria, gia Gio. Battista Spinola, Genova. Facciata su via Garibaldi. Portal

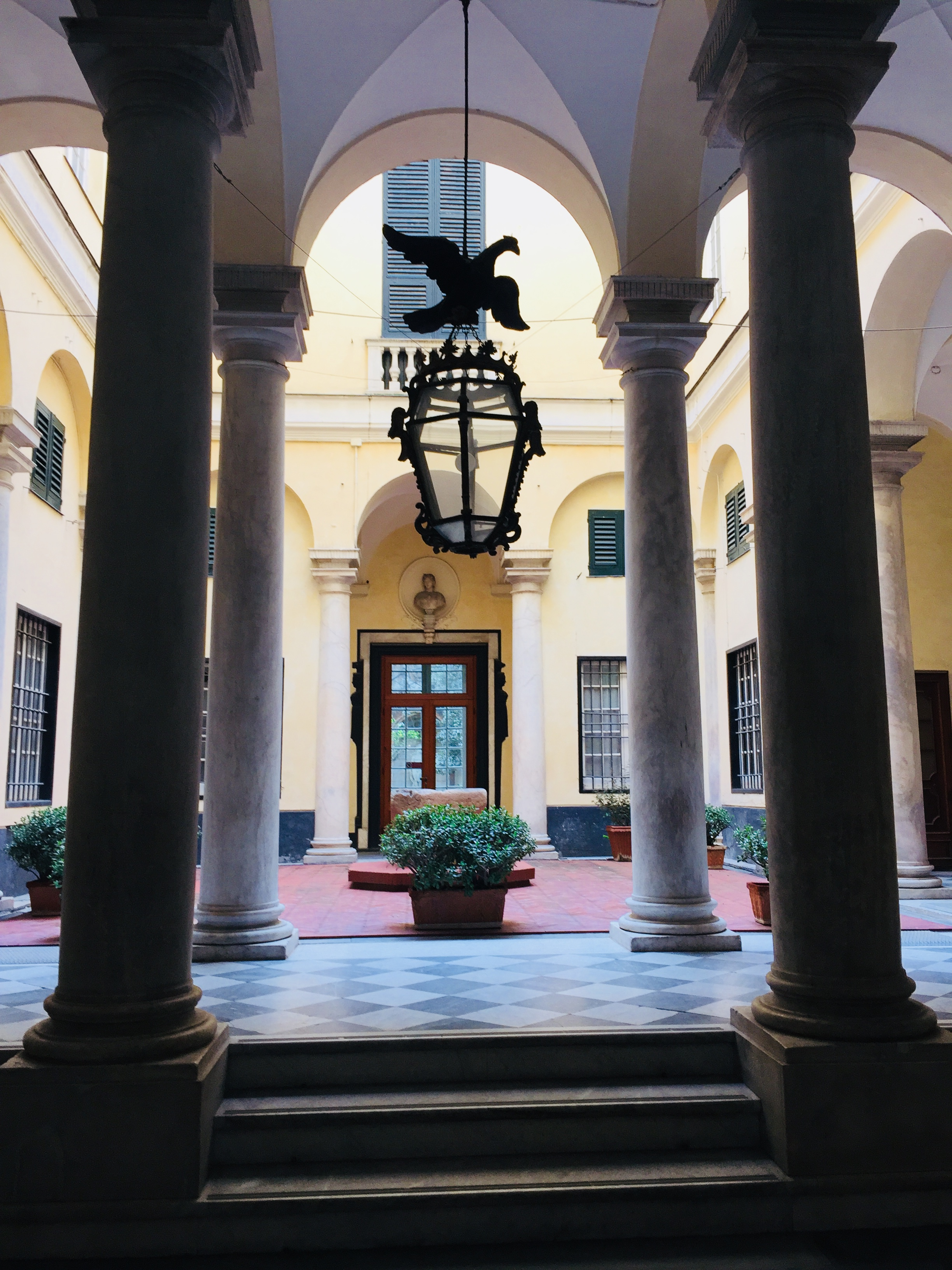
Palazzo Doria, gia Gio. Battista Spinola, Genova. Atrium

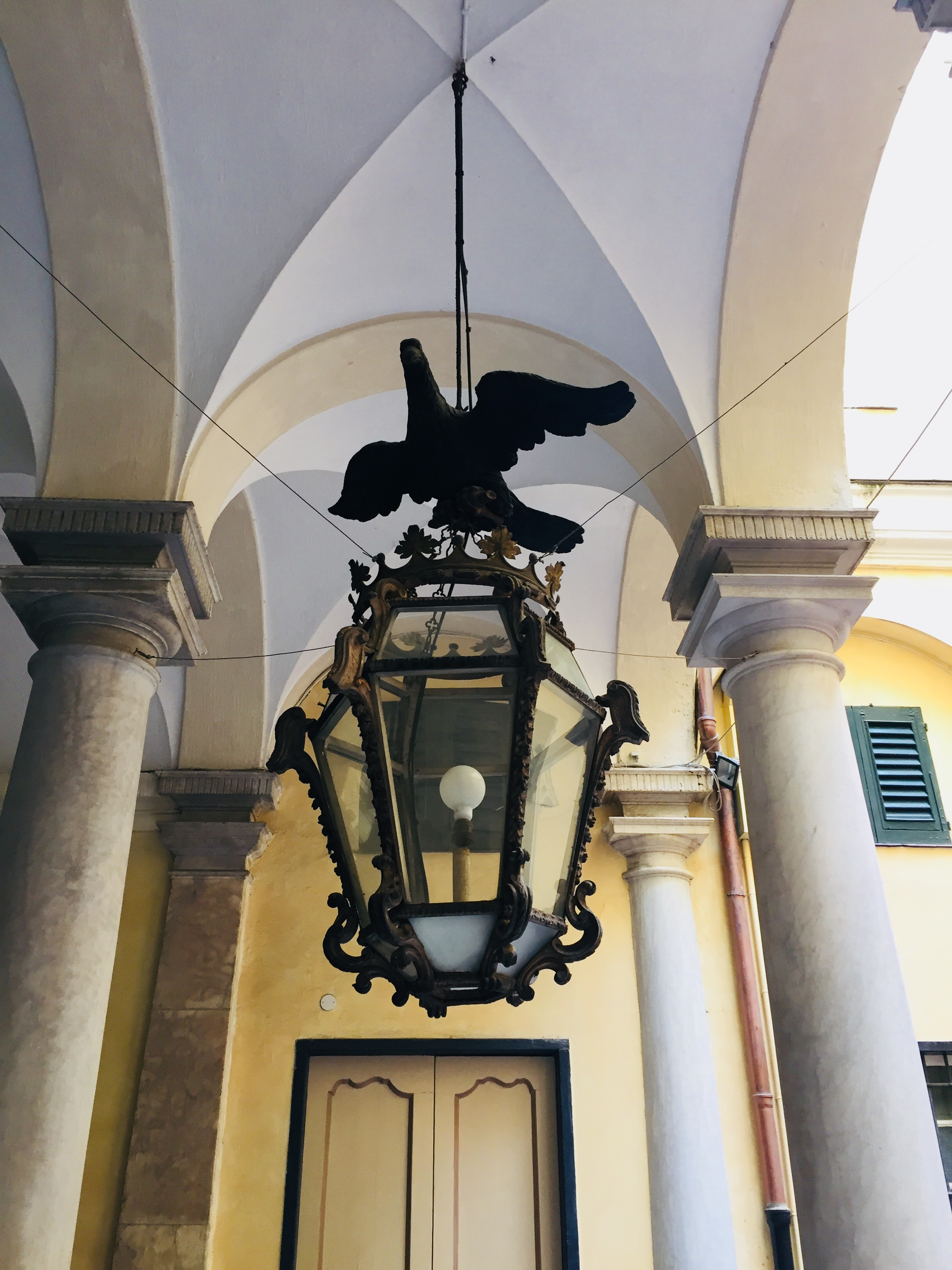
Palazzo Doria, gia Gio. Battista Spinola, Genova. Lantern in the atrium

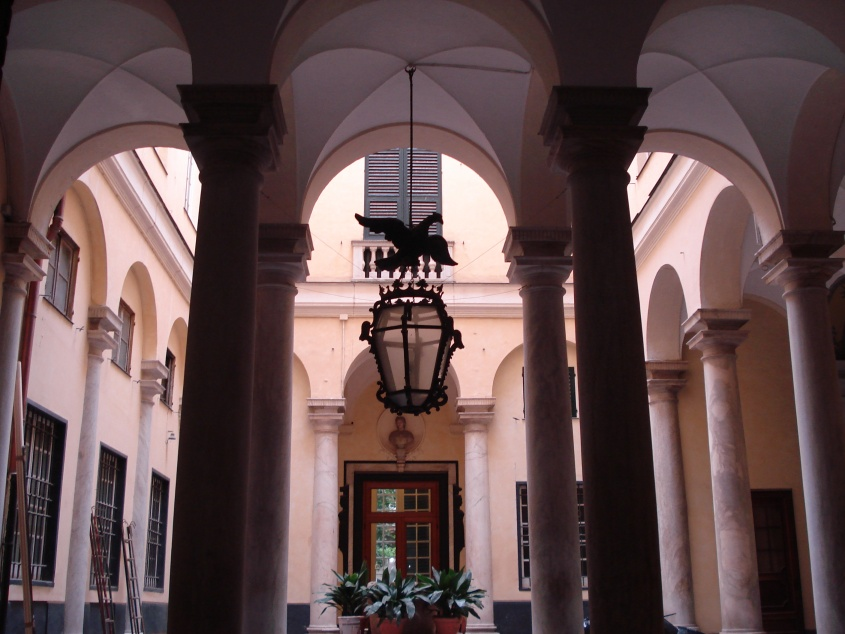
Palazzo Doria, gia Gio. Battista Spinola, Genova. Courtyard

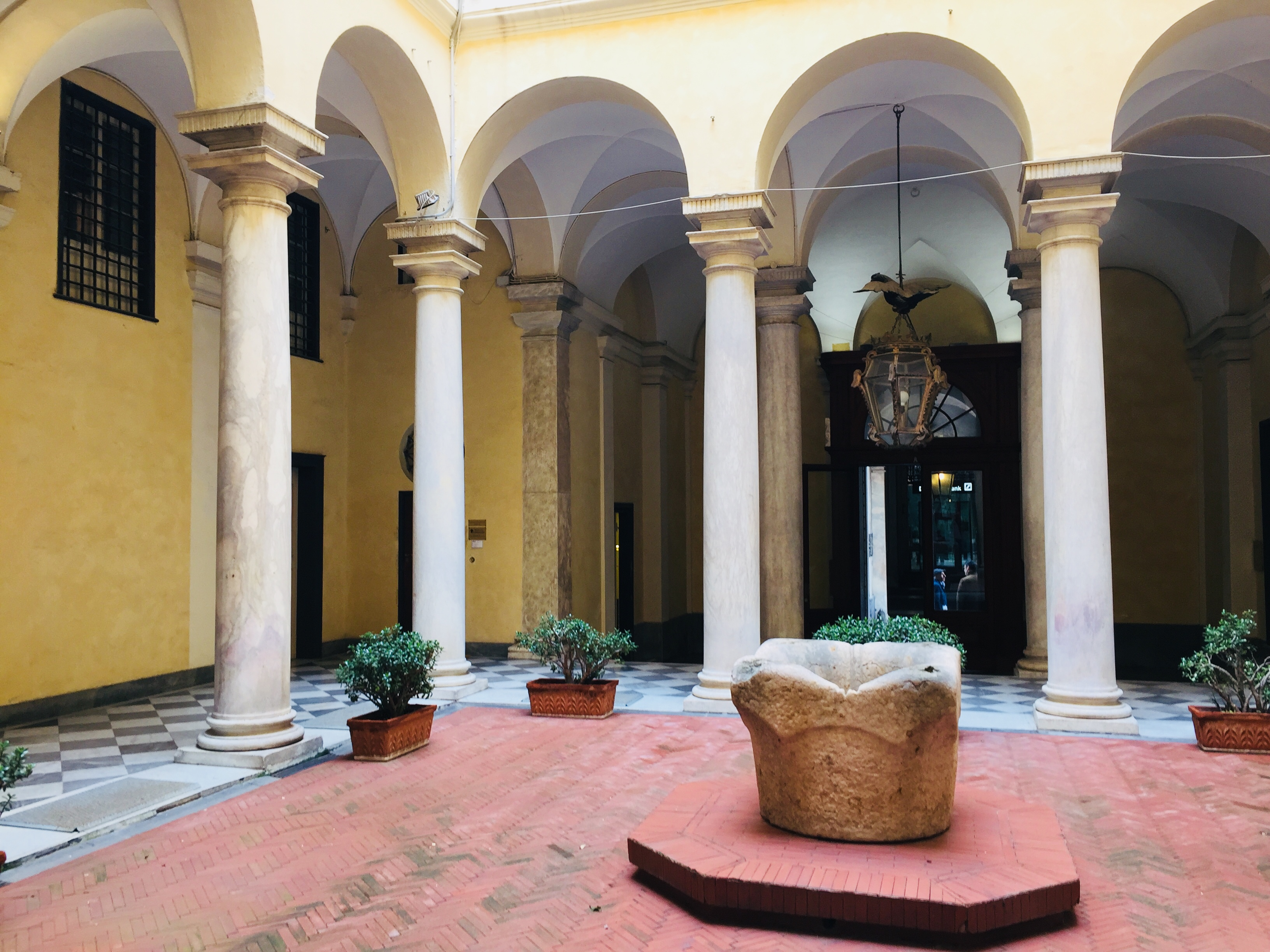
Palazzo Doria, gia Gio. Battista Spinola, Genova. Courtyard

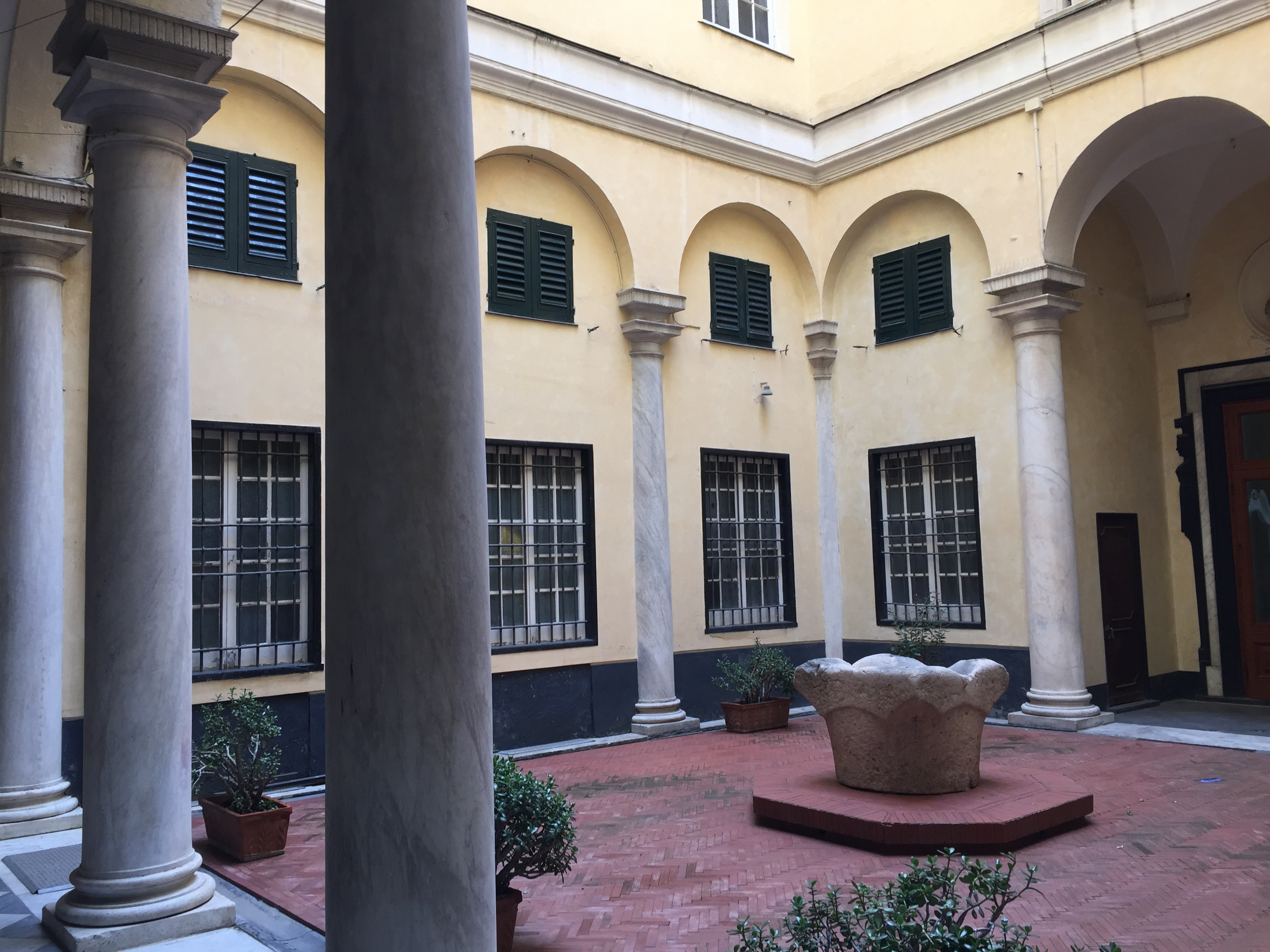
Palazzo Doria, gia Gio. Battista Spinola, Genova. Courtyard

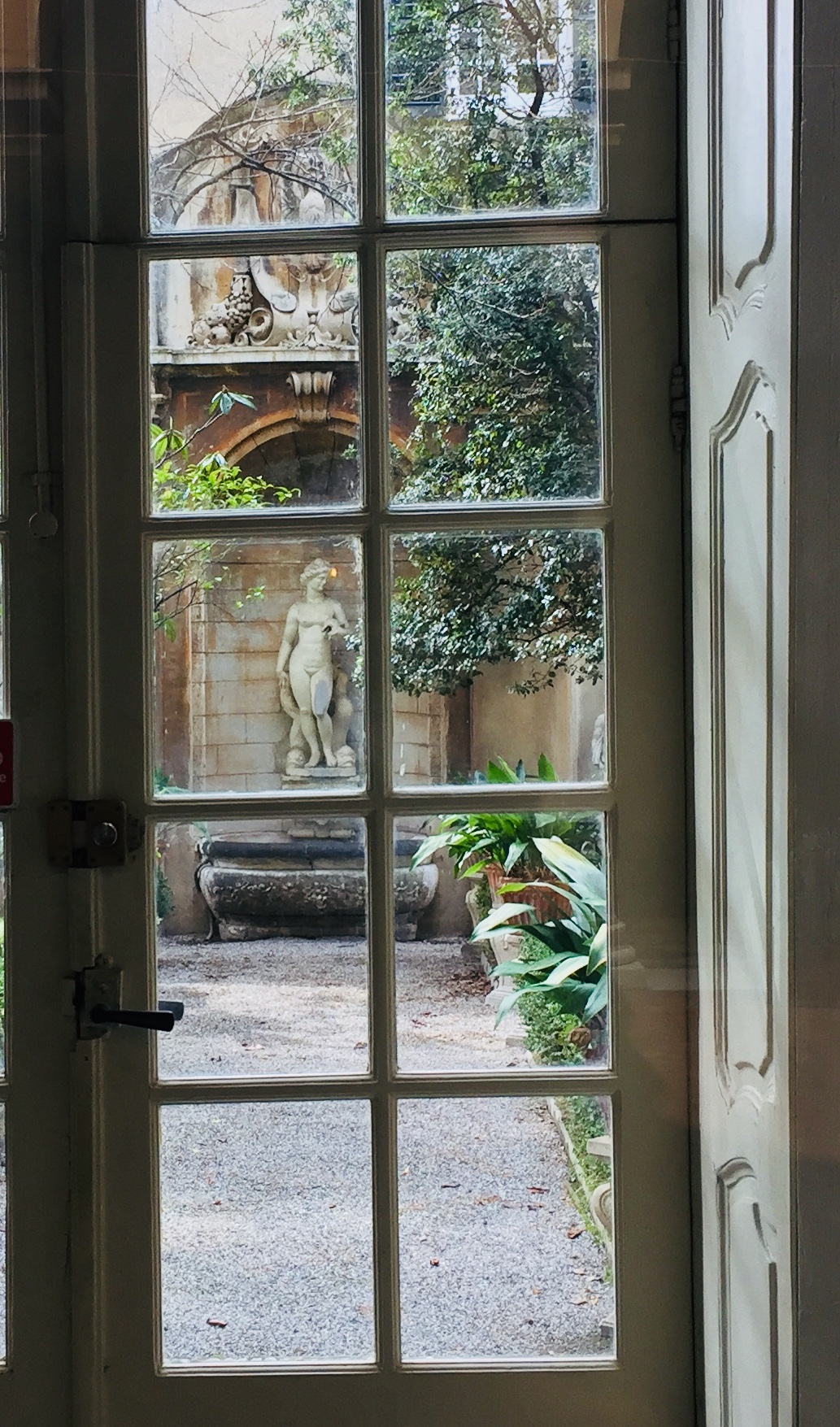
Palazzo Doria, gia Gio. Battista Spinola, Genova. Garden

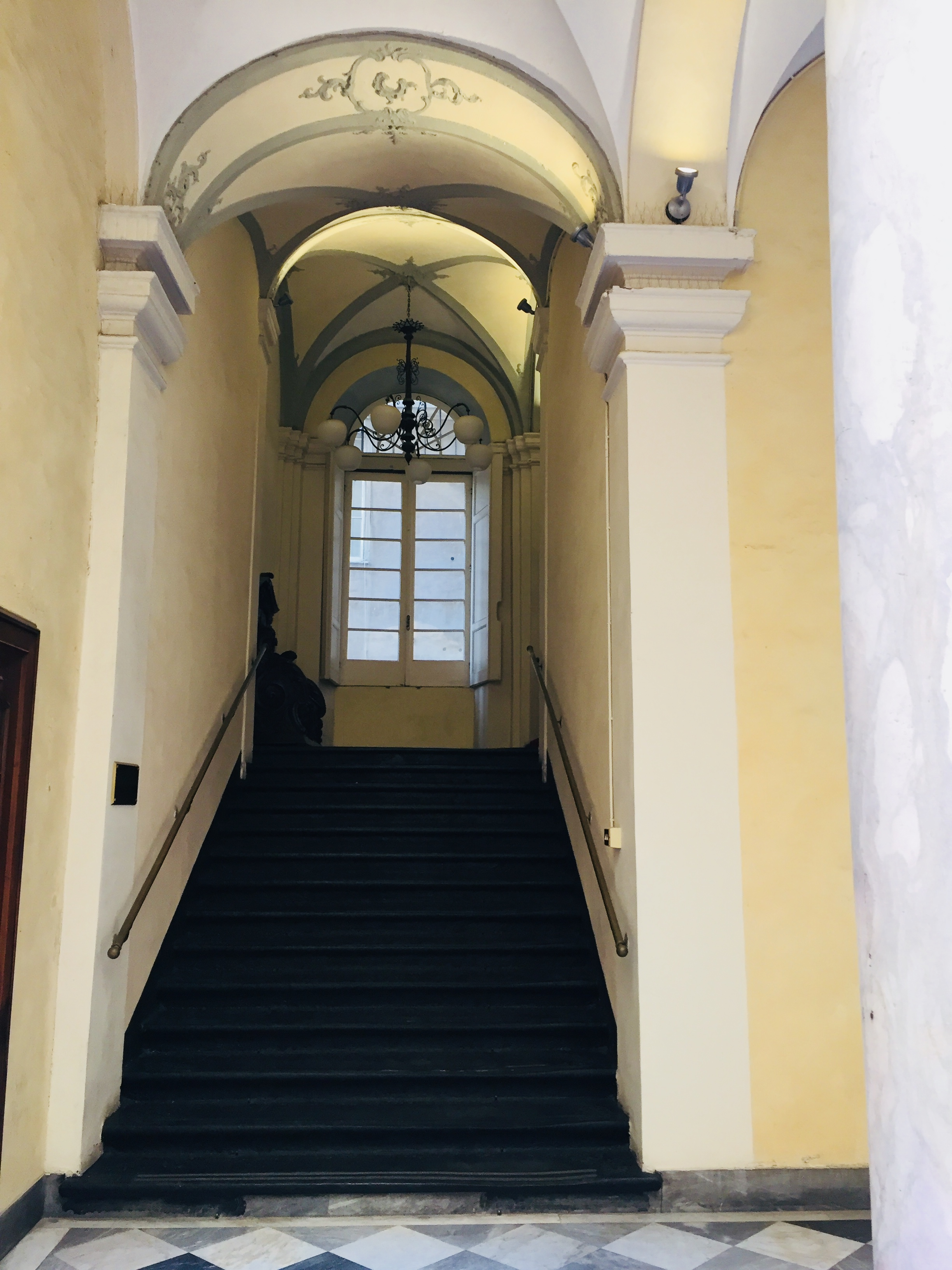
Palazzo Doria, gia Gio. Battista Spinola, Genova. Staircase
