= Palazzo Lercari-Parodi =

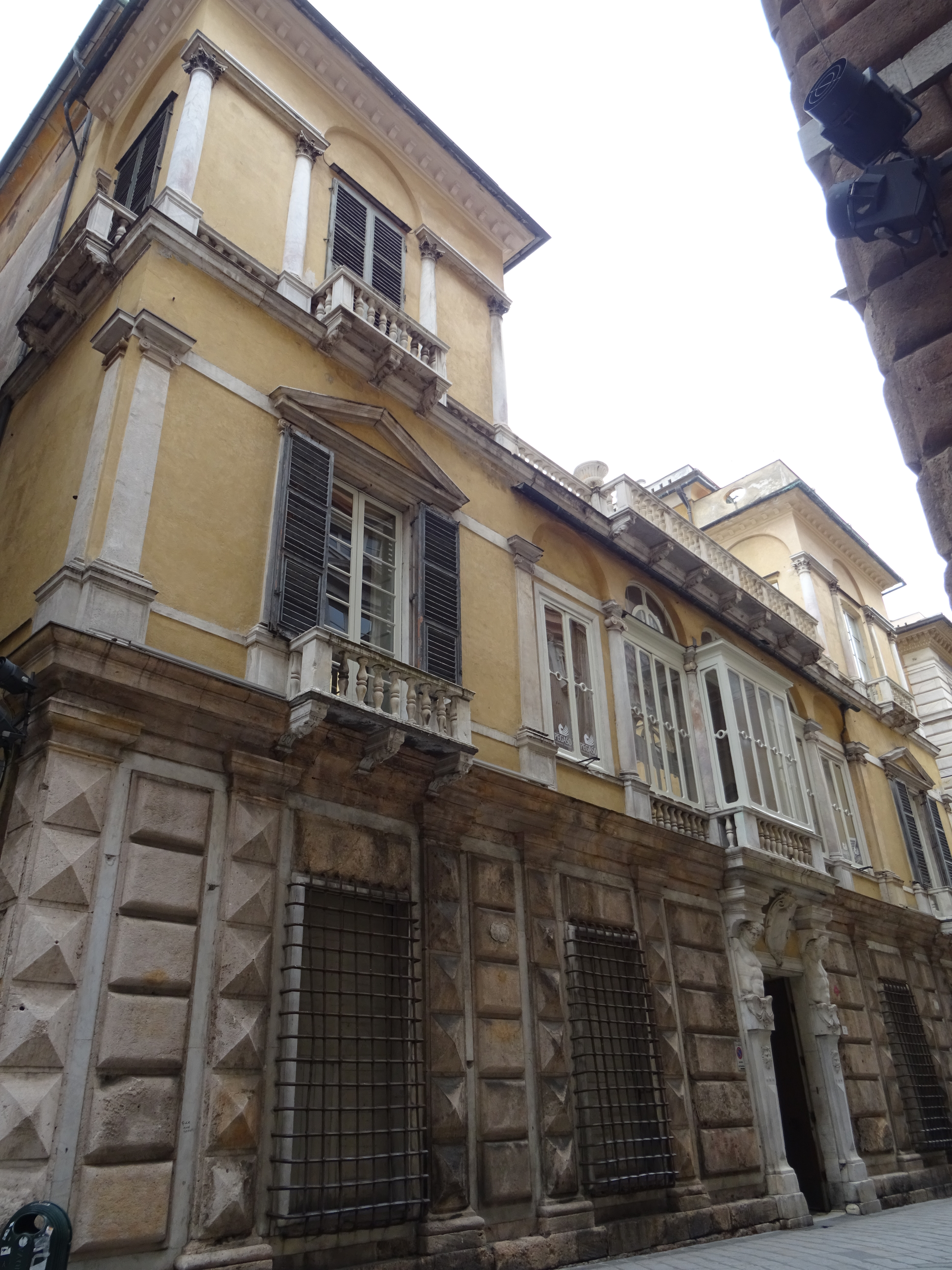
- The palace portal in via Garibaldi 3
- Interactive map of the Palazzo Lercari-Parodi area
- Alternative names: Palazzo Franco Lercari

General information
- Status: In use
- Type: Palace
- Architectural style: Mannerist
- Location: Genoa, Italy, 3 Via Garibaldi
- Coordinates: 44.411006°N 8.934442°E
- Construction started: 1571
- Completed: 1578

Design and construction
- Architect: Franco Lercari

UNESCO World Heritage Site
- Part of: Genoa: Le Strade Nuove and the system of the Palazzi dei Rolli
- Criteria: Cultural: (ii)(iv)
- Reference: 1211
- Inscription: 2006 (30th Session)

The Palazzo Lercari-Parodi or Palazzo Franco Lercari is a building located at number 3, Via Garibaldi in the historical centre of Genoa, included on 13 July 2006 in the list of the 42 palaces inscribed in the Rolli di Genova that became World Heritage by UNESCO on that date.

== History ==
It was erected from 1571 by Franco Lercari, a wealthy banker, who held the position of governor of the Genoese Republic in the 1570s and was also the patron of Villa Lercari in Sampierdarena and of the Lercari Chapel in the apse of the Cathedral of San Lorenzo. In 1586 Franco Lercari left his entire estate to Francesco Maria Imperiali of Francavilla, with the obligation of also taking the surname Lercari. The last descendant of the Imperiali Lercari family was Maria Luigia, who married the Modenese marquis Lodovico Coccapani, later Coccapani Imperiali, and brought the palace as dowry. The descendants Ercole and Lodovico Coccapani Imperiali in 1845 sold it to the banker Bartolomeo Parodi, whose family still owns it.

== Description ==
The palace, whose designer is unknown, differs from the buildings on Strada Nuova. The lower part of the façade is decorated with diamond-pointed ashlar, while the upper floors were originally relieved by a series of open loggias, later closed by glazing and walled up in the early Ocento, as can be seen from Rubens' engravings in the 1652 edition of Palazzi di Genova.

Also on the façade is the portal supported by two telamons with mozzi noses, the work of Taddeo Carlone, who here evokes the atrocious legend of Megollo Lercari, ancestor of the commissioner, took revenge on his enemies by mutilating their noses and ears.

=== First floor ===
Going up to the first of the two piani nobili, in the loggia, within two nicchie, there are the busts of Franco Lercari and his wife Antonia De Marini by Taddeo Carlone, the Emperor Charles V of Habsburg and the King of Spain Filippo II. The fresco decoration, from the end of the 16th century, is due to Lazzaro Calvi, assisted by his brother Pantaleo, with airy landscapes on the walls and, on the Vault, military scenes inspired by Roman historyː The Sfida tra Orazi e Curiazi, Curzio Rufo, Orazio Coclite. Other parlours on the first floor are frescoed by Calvi with Biblical Episodes. The most valuable room on the first floor is frescoed by Luca Cambiaso with Stories of Niobe on the vault.

=== Second floor ===
In the loggia, only the Gigantomachia by Ottavio Semino, author also of the Biblical Stories of King David, survives of the original decoration, while the Biblical Stories of the Sala del Moltiplico Lercari are by Calvi.

In the vault of the hall on the second piano nobile is a famous masterpiece of Genoese Mannerism: the fresco by Luca Cambiaso depicting Megollo Lercari's enterprise of building the Genoese's warehouse in Trebizond, i.e. the constructions needed to conduct trade in the Genoese colony on the Black Sea. The fresco, surrounded by Illustrious Ancestors of the Lercari, is at the same time intended to recall the construction of the Lercari palace in Strada Nuova, thus providing an idea of the appearance of the street in the years of its opening.

== Gallery ==
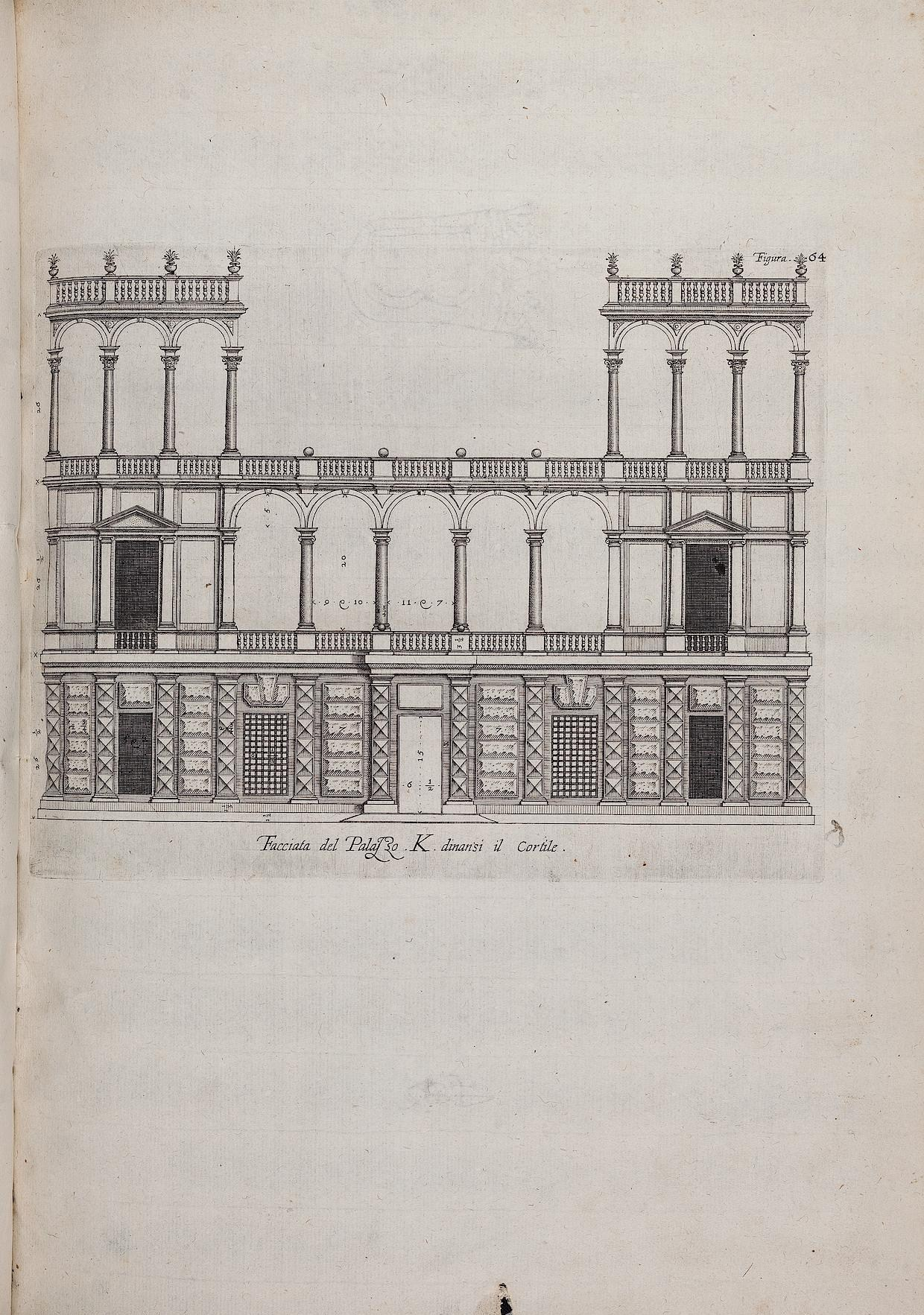
Rubens - Palazzi di Genova.

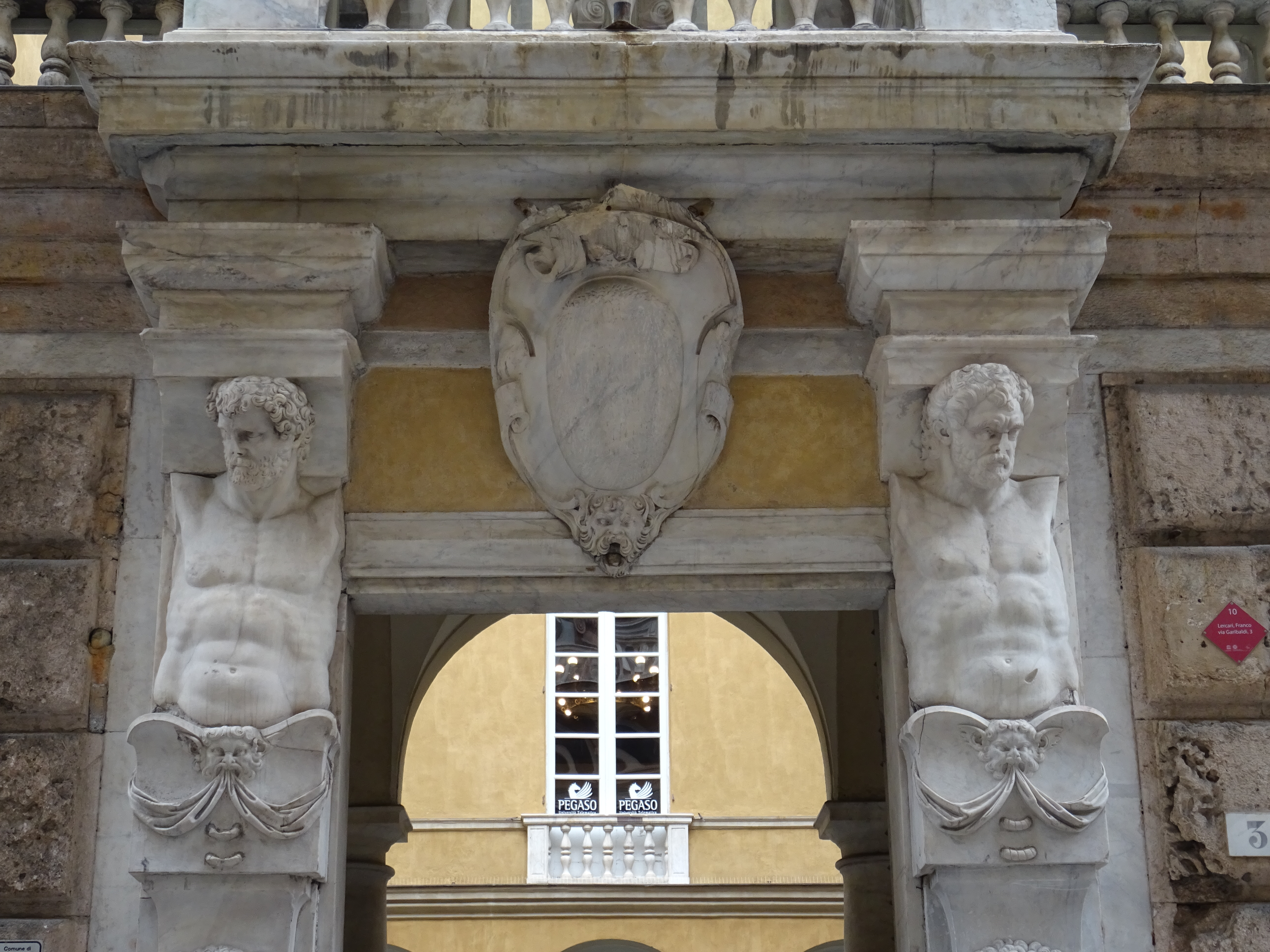
Taddeo Carlone, entrance portal

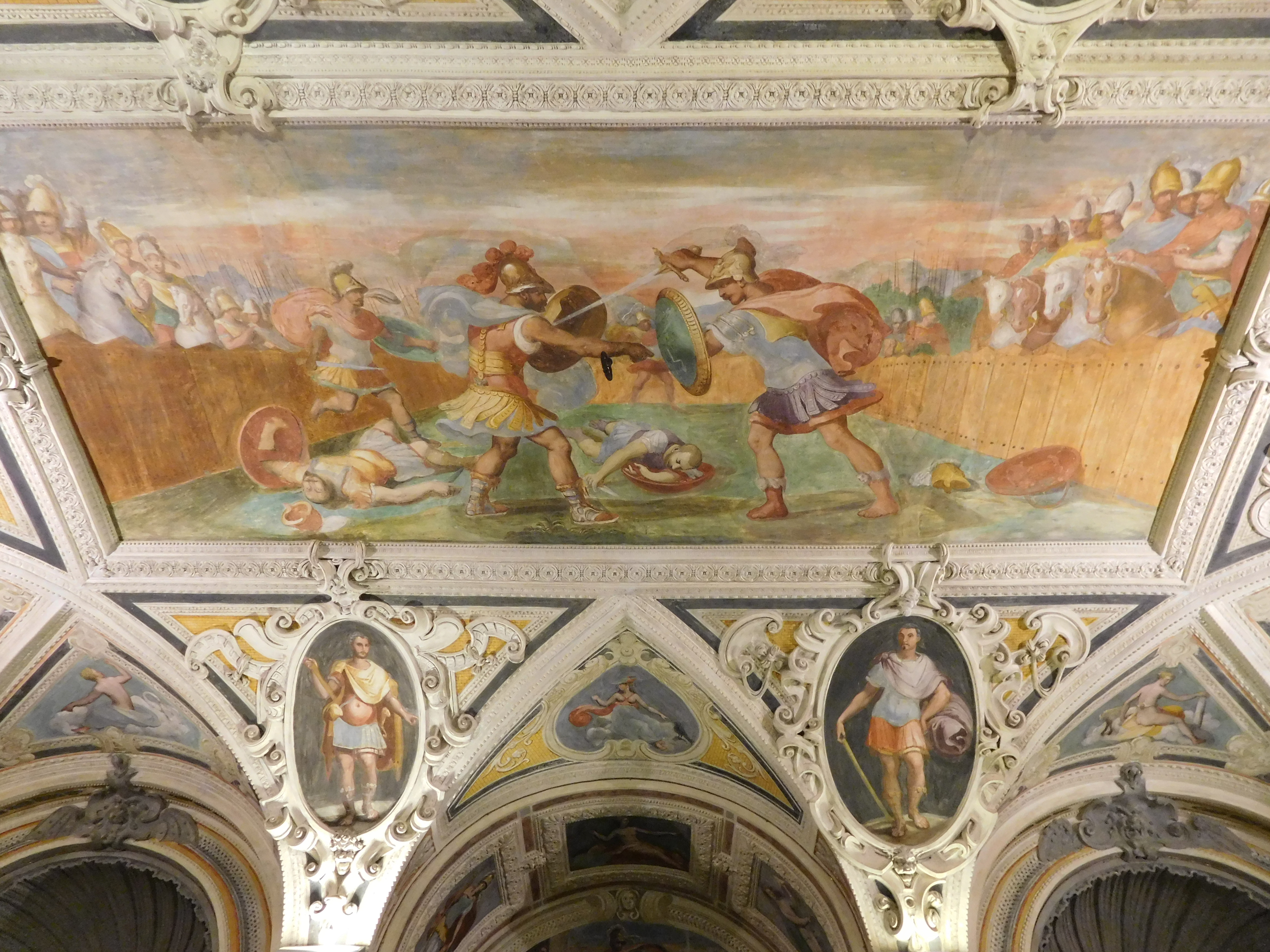
Lazzaro Calvi, Challenge between Horatii and Curiatii

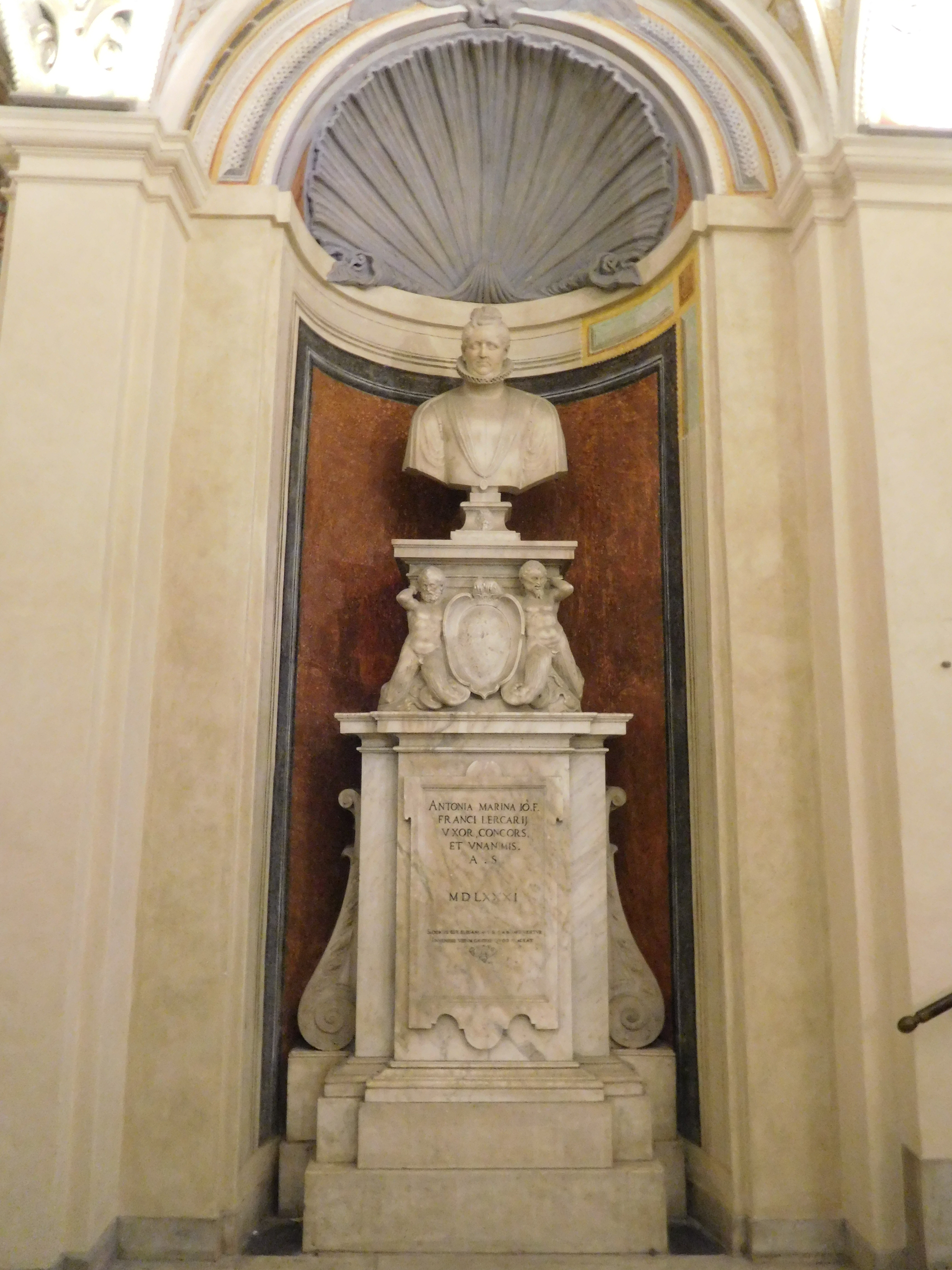
Bust of Antonia De Marini, by Taddeo Carlone

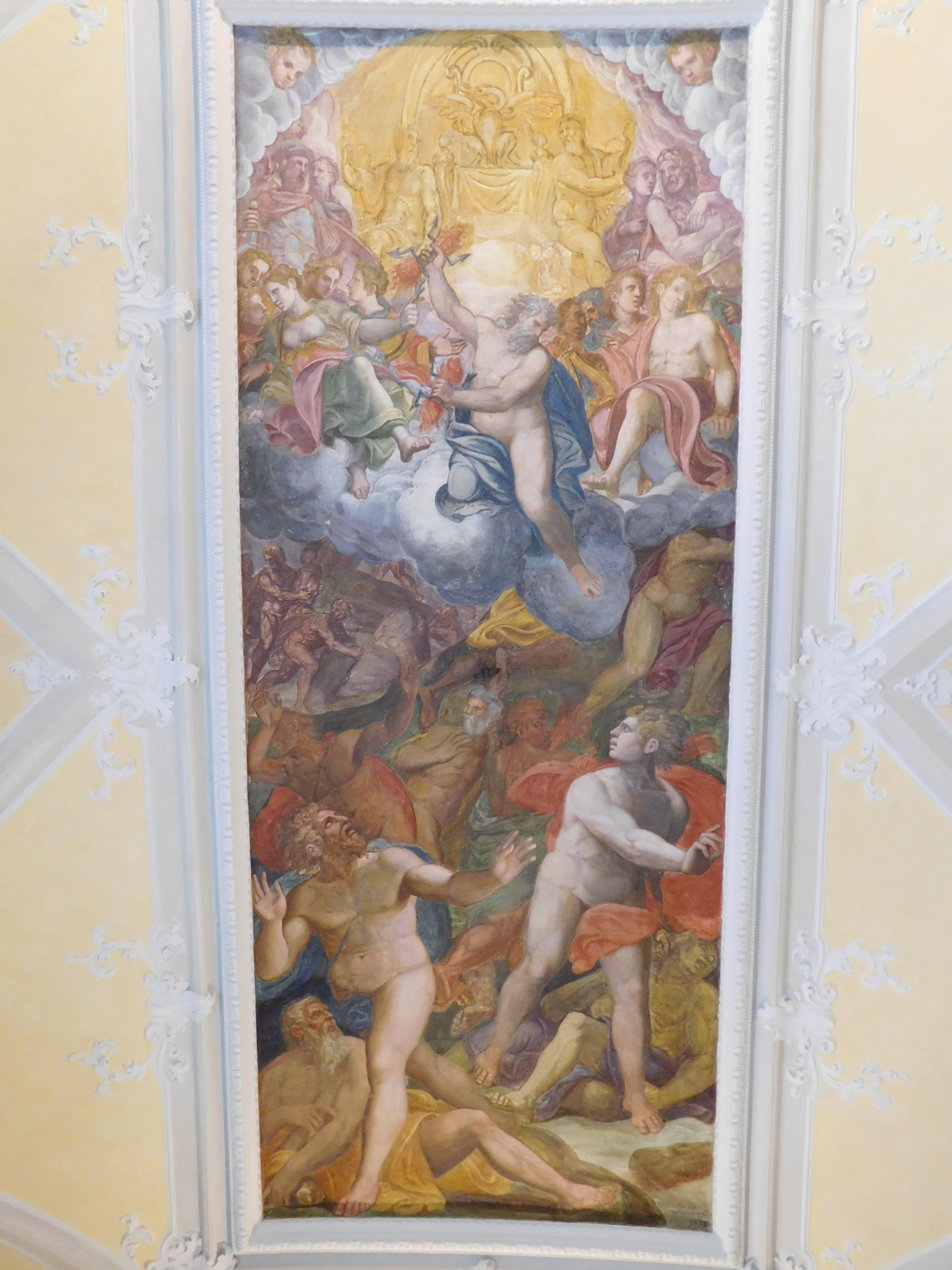
Gigantomachia by Ottavio Semino

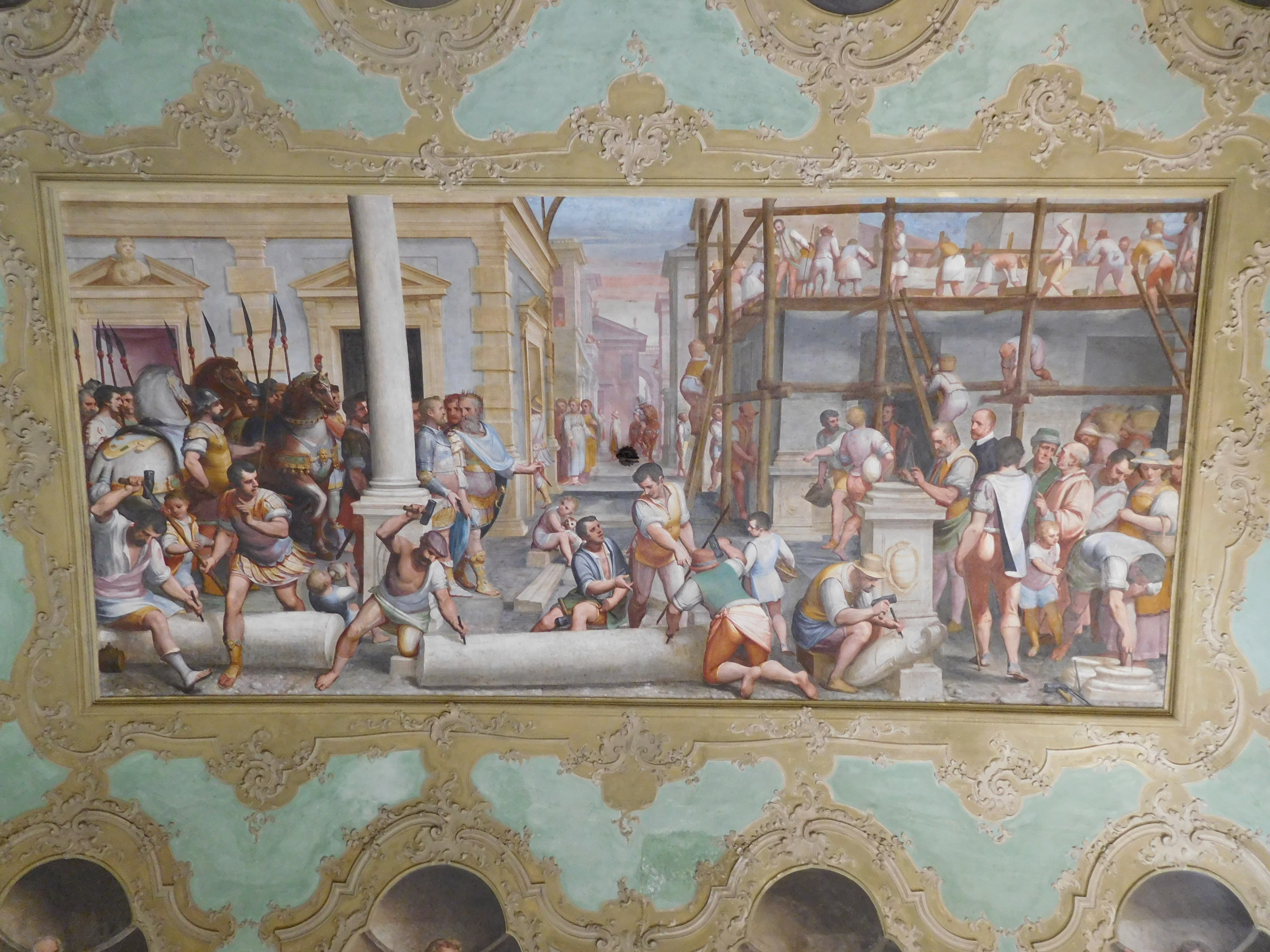
Luca Cambiaso, The enterprise of Megollo Lercari in Trebizond.

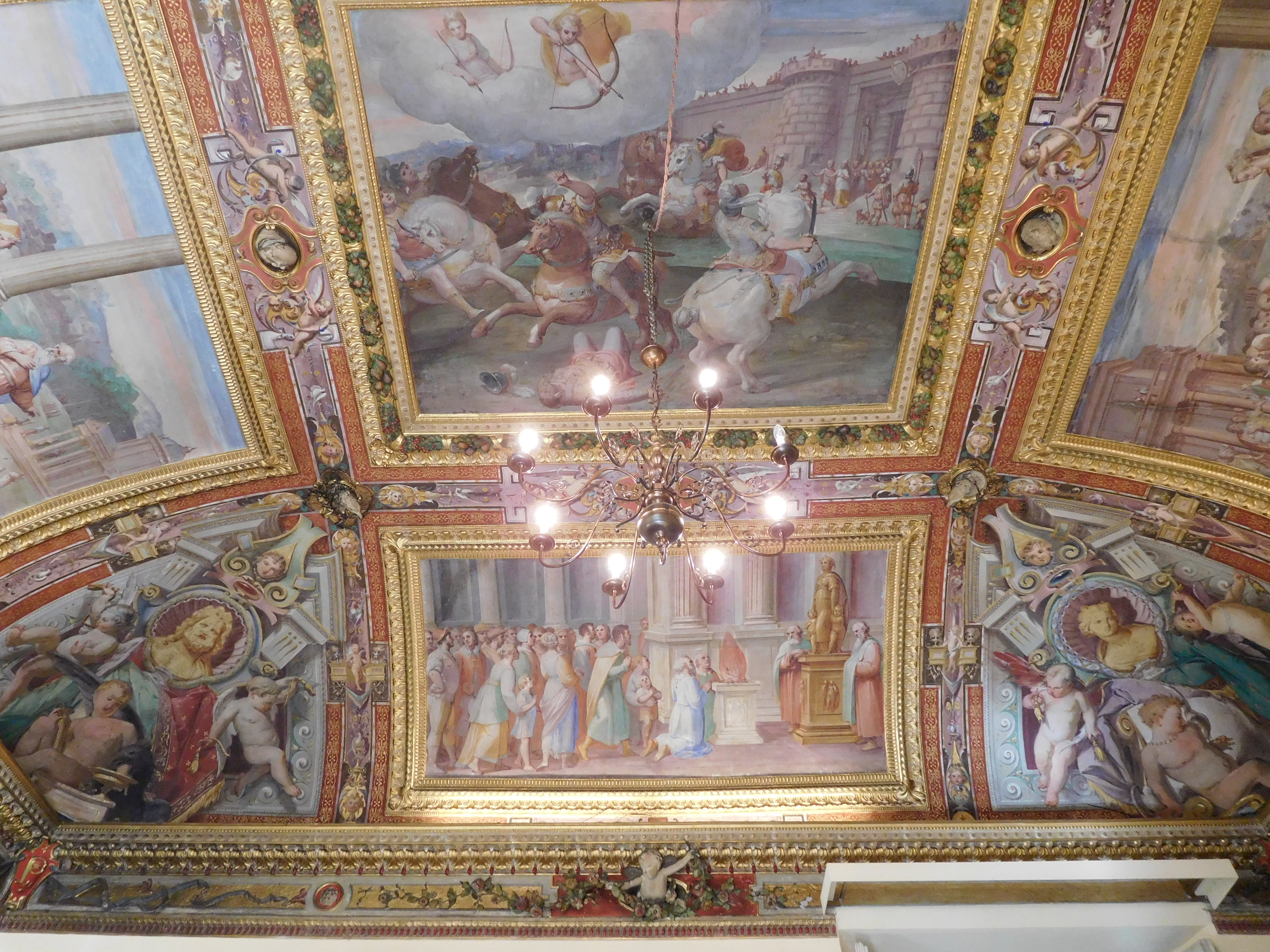
Luca Cambiaso, Stories of Niobe

== Sources ==
=== Italian sources ===
- E. Poleggi, Genova una civiltà di palazzi, Cinisello Balsamo (Milano) 2002, pp. 84–85 (Palazzo di Franco Lercari (1572–1578)).
- E. Poleggi, L’invenzione dei Rolli, catalogo della mostra, Genova 2004.
