= Villa del Principe =

Historic building and art museum in Genoa, Italy

Villa del Principe Palazzo di Andrea Doria
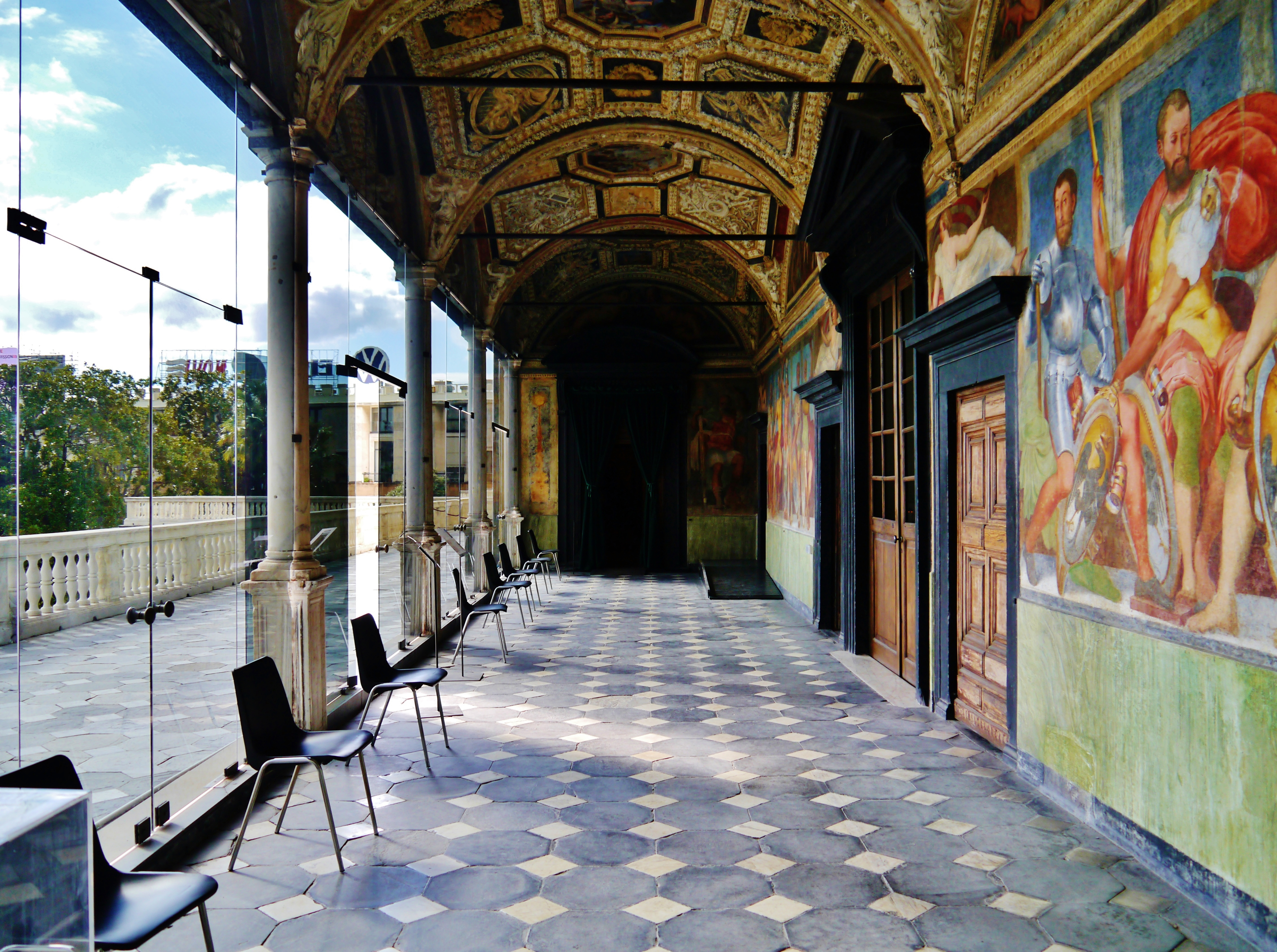
- Perino del Vaga, Loggia degli Eroi
- Interactive fullscreen map
- Location: Piazza del Principe, 4, Genoa, Italy
- Coordinates: 44°24′58″N 8°55′03″E
- Type: Art museum, design/textile museum, historic site
- Public transit access: Genova Piazza Principe railway station
- Website: www.doriapamphilj.it/genova/

Villa del Principe
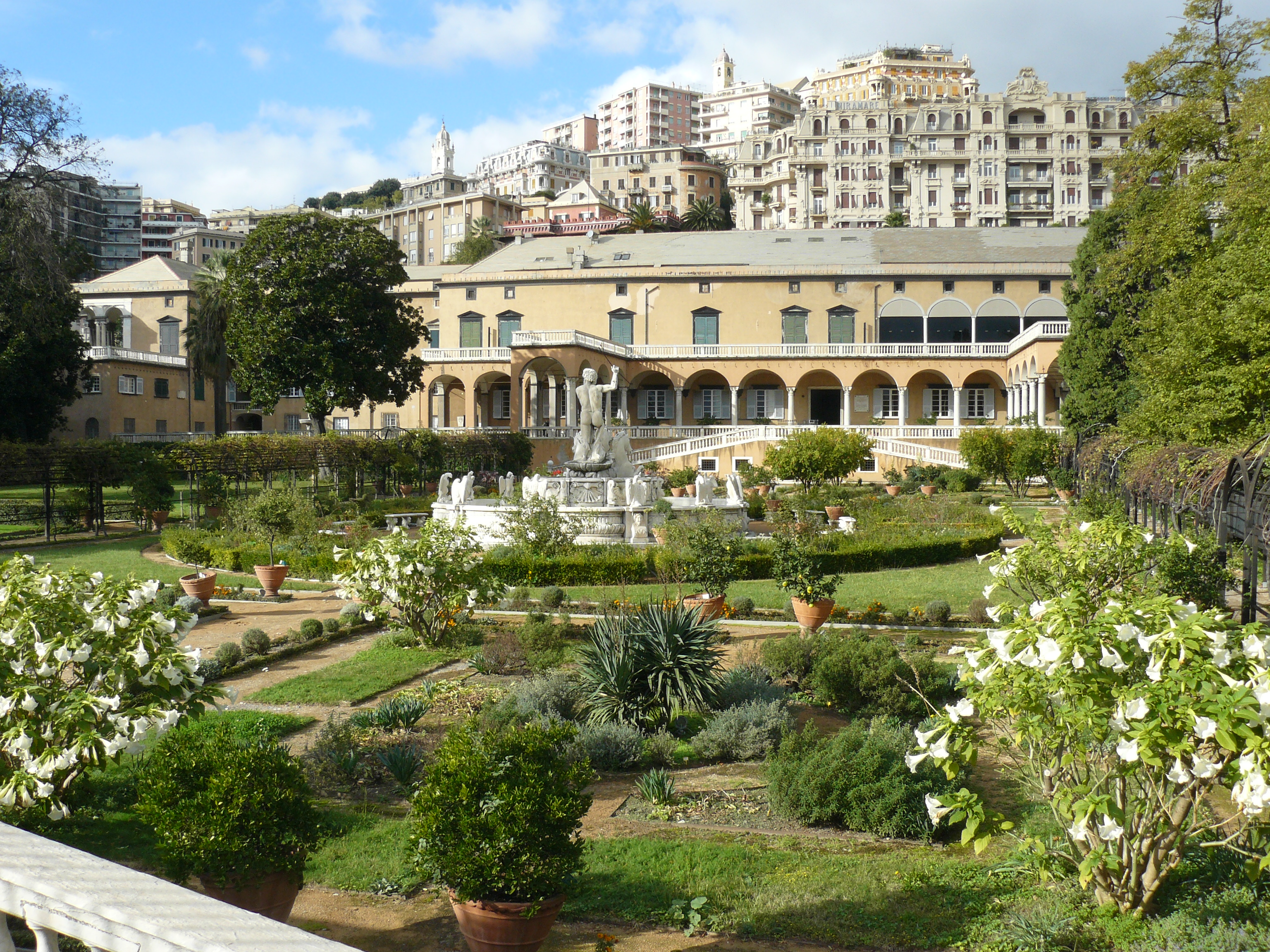
- Villa del Principe and its Italian gardens to the South
- Interactive map of the Villa del Principe area
- Alternative names: Palazzo del Principe or Palace of Andrea Doria in Fassolo

General information
- Status: In use
- Type: Villa
- Architectural style: Italian Renaissance
- Location: Piazza del Principe, 4, 16126, Genoa, Italy
- Named for: Admiral Andrea Doria, Prince of Melfi
- Construction started: 1529
- Completed: 1578
- Client: Andrea Doria; Giovanni Andrea I Doria
- Owner: Trust Doria Pamphilj

Renovating team
- Architects: Perino Buonaccorsi, known as Perino del Vaga; Antonio Roderio; and Giovanni Ponzello

Website
- https://www.doriapamphilj.it/en/genoa

The Villa del Principe, Palazzo del Principe, or Palace of Andrea Doria in Fassolo is one of the main historical suburban villas of Genoa, Italy. It was built in the 16th century in an area that is now located in the city center, but at the time of the construction of the villa was just outside of the city walls towards Capo di Faro and the Lanterna.

The villa was intended as the private residence of the Genoese admiral Andrea Doria, Prince of Melfi, who often hosted emperors, kings and other foreign authorities. The villa was nonetheless never officially listed as a Palazzo dei Rolli of the Republic of Genova as it was a suburban villa and not an urban palace.

From his residence, Andrea Doria was able to exert a strong political influence on the city, while staying away from the Doge's Palace and the often-treacherous political life of the Republic.

The villa is considered one of the masterpieces of the Italian Renaissance. The interior, recently restored, is decorated with frescoes, stuccoes, tapestries and historical wooden furniture. Particularly noteworthy are Perino del Vaga's frescoes in the Salone dei Giganti and in the Loggia degli Eroi (1533), and the Flemish tapestries portraying the Battle of Lepanto (1571).

It still belongs to the Doria Pamphili family and it is open to the public as a museum.

== History ==
=== Andrea Doria and the liberation of Genoa in 1528 ===
Andrea Doria (Oneglia, 1466 – Genova, 1560) was a Genoese aristocrat, statesman and naval commander who served for many years in the Genoese navy, as well as offering his services as mercenary commander.

In 1528, when Genoa was under French military occupation, he attacked the harbor with thirteen galeas and took control of the city. Once the battle was over, he was offered to become the Head of State, but he declined the offer saying that he was “not interested in the perks of power, but only in the independence and prosperity of the Republic”. Realistically, many historians believe that his decision to decline the offer was dictated by his cautious approach and his deep knowledge of the Genoese political landscape.

The Doria family, one of the most illustrious among the Genoese nobility, had its quarters in the heart of the city, around the Church of San Matteo, a Romanic church under their patronage and burial place of the family from its foundation in 1125. On 12 September 1528, after the liberation of the city from the French, Andrea pronounced his non acceptance speech from the stairs of that iconic church. On the same day he received, as a thank you gift from the Senate, the Lazzaro Doria Palace in Piazza San Matteo, which he never inhabited. Instead, he preferred to live outside the city, where he could continue to wield considerable power on the life of the Republic without being entangled in lesser political skirmishes. Thus, twelve reformers were appointed to write the new Constitution, which sanctioned the status of Genoa as an oligarchic republic, and consecrated Andrea Doria as "Censor for life" and ‘Father of the Motherland”.

=== The Villa del Principe in Fassolo ===
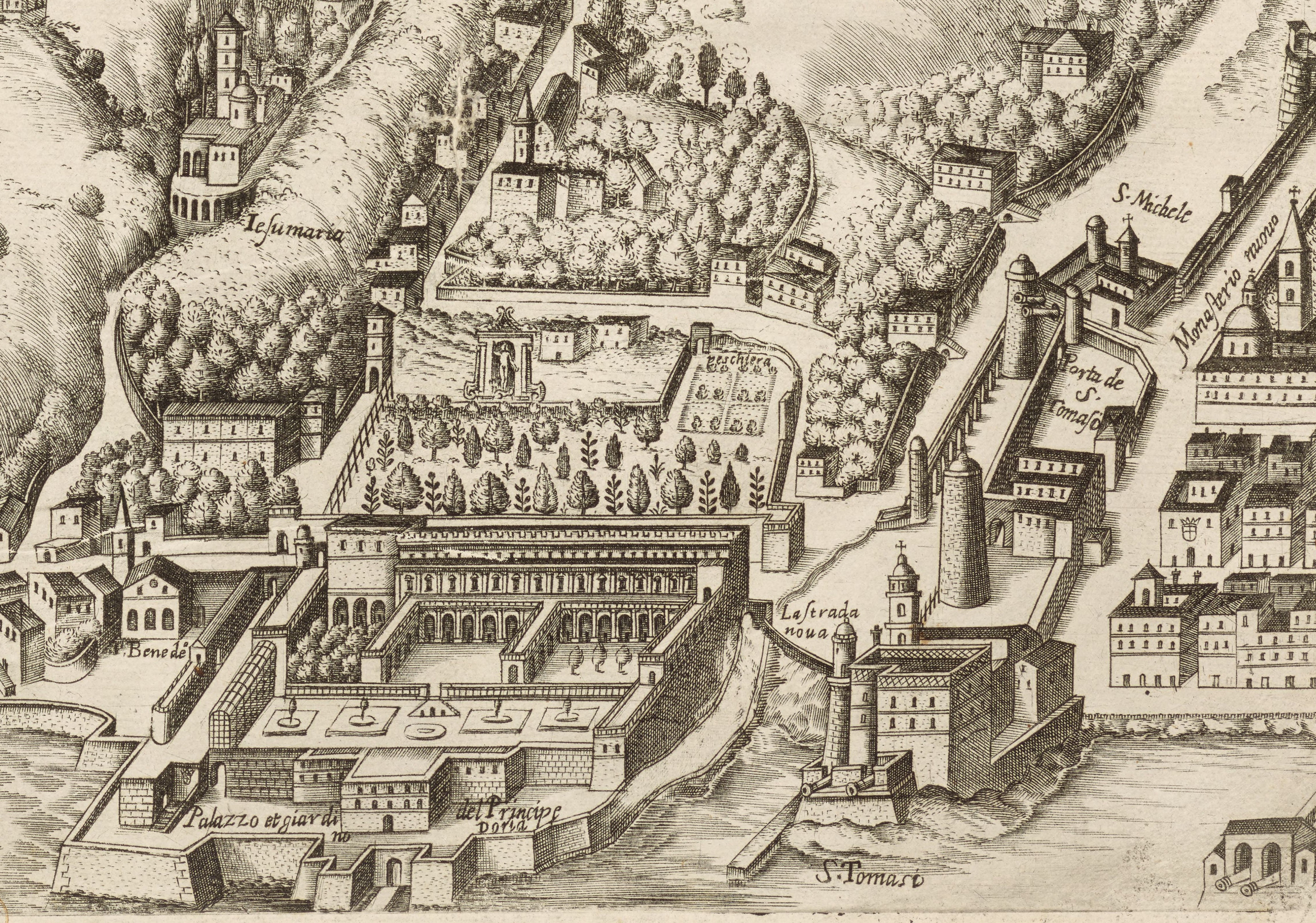
Villa del Principe in 1637 with the statue of the Giant in the Northern part of its park and the Italian gardens at the front

Andrea Doria chose to live in his villa in Fassolo, in an area just outside the now demolished Porta di San Tomaso, where he lived until his death. He purchased the estate in 1521 from the Lomellini family who had acquired it from the Recanelli family in 1498. As the villa was significantly damaged during the war events of 1528, Andrea decided to purchase also the neighboring villa Giustinani Furneto and commissioned the restoration of the combined two villas to Perino Buonaccorsi, known as Perino del Vaga (1501–1547). The restoration took place from 1529 to 1533. After the death of Andrea in 1560, the villa was further enlarged by his successor Giovanni Andrea I Doria, who commissioned from Antonio Roderio the edification of the west wing and from Giovanni Ponzello the construction of the lateral loggias towards the sea.

The villa remained at the center of the political, artistic and mundane life of Genoa for the whole 16th century. In 1529 and 1533, it hosted the Holy Roman Emperor Charles V and, in 1548, the King of Spain Philip II. In those occasions, according to the ancient chronicles, the prince organized sumptuous receptions by the seashore, jousts to celebrate his illustrious guests and fireworks to impress the crowds. In the 16th century, the villa was the one and only court that the Republic of Genoa has ever known.

In the 19th century, the villa was still renowned for its beauty and hosted the French Emperor Napoleon Bonaparte, the King of Italy Victor Emmanuel II and the famous opera composer Giuseppe Verdi.

In 1854 the construction of the Turin–Genoa railway cut off the Northern part of the gardens from the villa, while in the 1880s the Stazione Marittima (English: “Maritime Terminal”) replaced Andrea Doria’s private harbor, cutting off the villa from the sea.

== Description ==
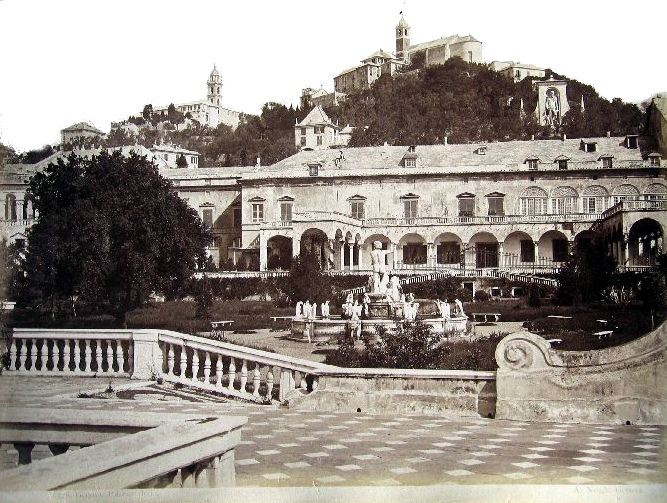
The Villa del Principe in the 19th century by Alfred Noack

=== Architecture ===
The Northern façade on Via San Benedetto is characterized by simple architectural lines, with a portal realized by Perino del Vaga and Silvio Cosini, surmounted by the coat of arms of the Doria family and the Latin motto "Fundavit eam Altissimus" (English: "God the Most High founded it”). The southern façade is an intricate combination of monumental loggias and colonnades overlooking the Italian gardens.

The architectural units preceding the renovation by Perin del Vaga are not fully integrated, as the interest of the architect was mainly decorative, rather than structural. His intervention, however, is clearly visible in the creation of the Loggia degli Eroi, with its different style as compared with the Corinthian column of the underlying colonnade. The lateral loggias, with a Serlian design, are later additions that contribute to the overall grandiosity of the building.

=== Decoration ===
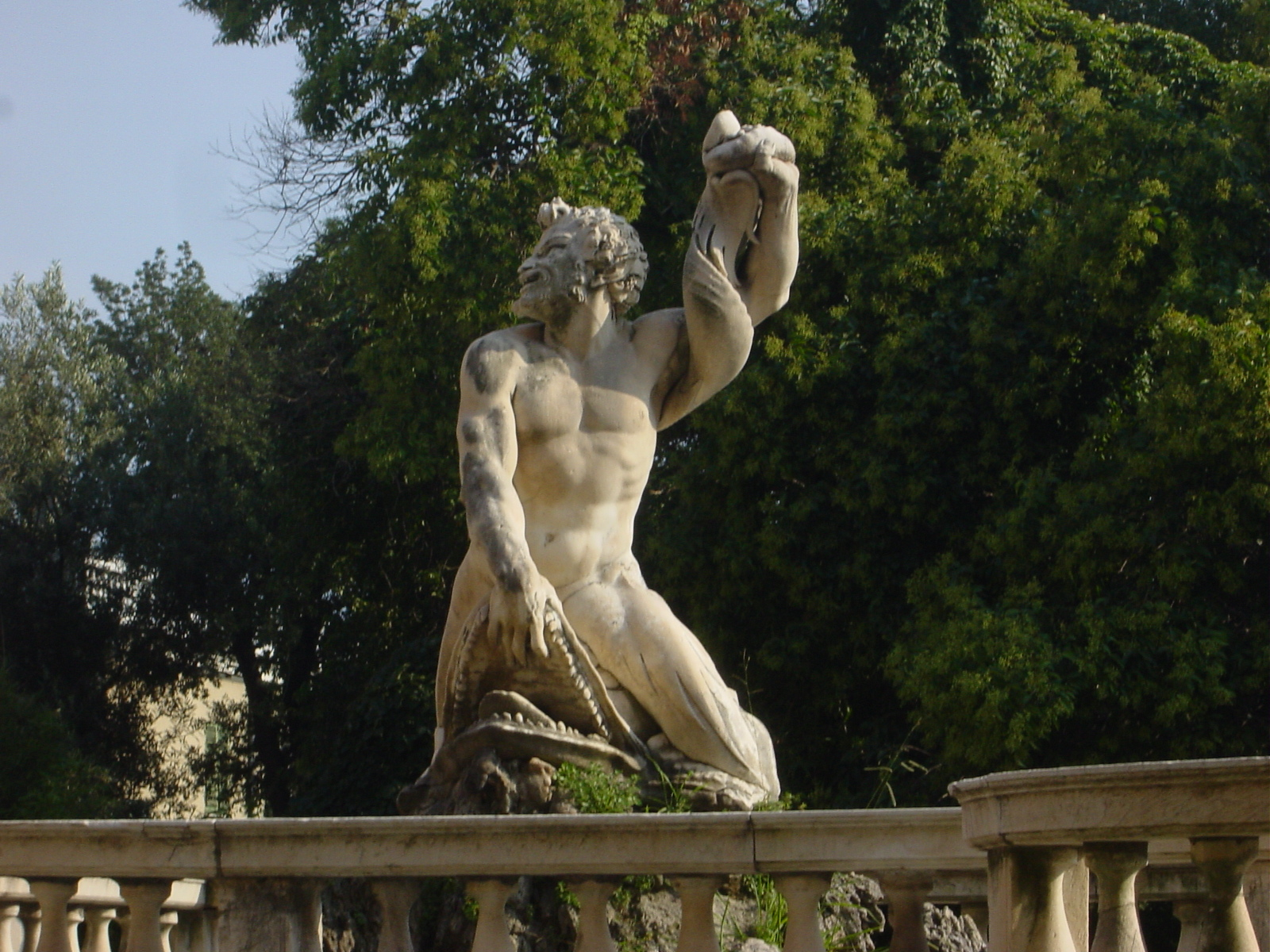
Statue of the Triton

The pictorial decoration of the exterior, vastly celebrated already at the time of the reconstruction of the villa, was attributed to Girolamo da Treviso, Domenico Beccafumi and to Il Pordenone. It is now lost but still worth noting doe to the great influence that it exerted on the Genoese painting school of the 16th century, from Antonio, Ottavio and Andrea Semino to Luca Cambiaso.

The interior still preserves a decoration of great impact and a large art collection, including paintings of Sebastiano del Piombo, Domenico Piola and the Bronzino.

==== The Loggia degli Eroi ====
The Loggia degli Eroi (English: “Loggia of the Heroes”) was decorated by Perino del Vaga with a wide set of frescoes and stuccoes according to mythological themes. In the vaults are depicted the Forefathers of the Dorias and the Roman Virtues.

These frescoes were already celebrated at the time of their execution and mentioned with great praise by Giorgio Vasari in his biography of Perino del Vaga in 1568.

==== The Prince’s Apartment ====
- Sala della Carità Romana
- Salone della Caduta dei Giganti e gli Arazzi di Alessandro Magno
- Camera di Perseo
- Camera dei sacrifici
- Camera di Cadmo
- Camera dello Zodiaco
- Sala di Paride
- Sala di Ercole

==== The Princess’s Apartment ====
- Salone del Nettuno o del naufragio
- Sala di Psiche
- Sala di Aracne
- Sala di Filemone
- Sala di Fetonte
- Sala del Tributo
- Sala del Trionfo
- Sala dei fatti di Prometeo
- Sala della Punizione

==== Galleria Aurea ====
Built for Giovanni Andrea I Doria, the Galleria Aurea (English: "Golden Gallery") has an elongated shape and is open on two sides. At the end of the 17th century, in line with the mutated tastes, it became the main reception hall of the villa instead of the Salone dei Giganti. Built by Battista Cantone e Luca Carlone in 1595, It was decorated with stuccoes and gold by the Italian sculptor Marcello Sparzo.

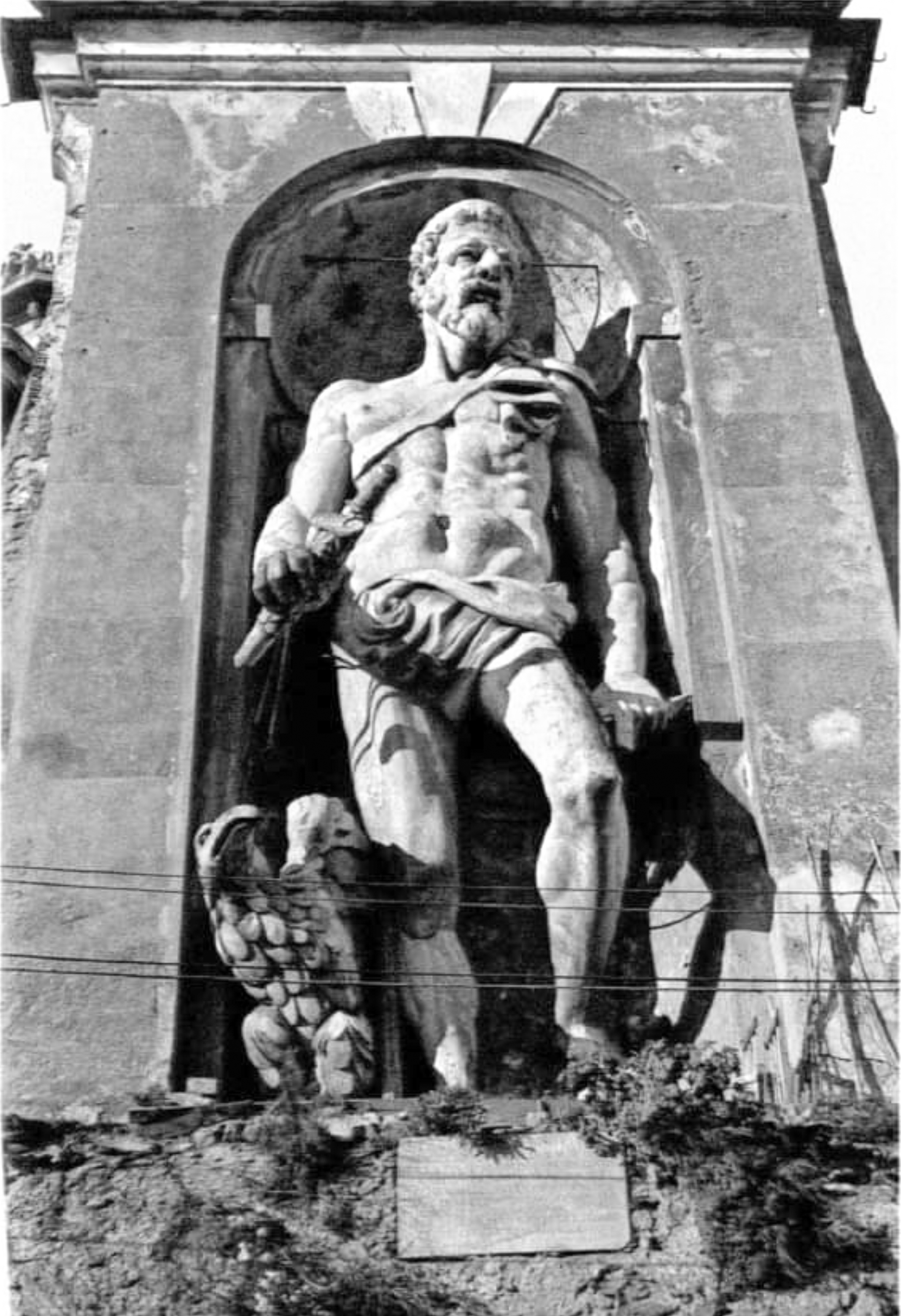
Marcello Sparzo, The colossal statue of Jupiter in the Northern gardens of the Villa del Principe. Demolished in 1929.

=== The gardens ===
The villa was surrounded by a luscious park, once extending from Andrea Doria’s private harbour up half-way to the top of the hill at the back of the villa. An artificial lake was built to source the water necessary for the fountains to flow, now interred but still remembered in the name of the uphill neighborhood called Lagaccio.

==== Southern gardens ====
The Southern part of the park towards the sea is landscaped as an Italian garden. It is open to the public and has been recently restored. It features the Fountain of the Triton by Giovanni Angelo Montorsoli, and the Fountain of Neptune by Taddeo Carlone, Giuseppe Carlone and Battista Carlone built between 1599 and 1601.

==== Northern gardens ====
The Northern part of the park used to be landscaped with monumental stairs, nymphaea and a colossal statue of Jupiter resembling Andrea Doria, made by Marcello Sparzo and known as "the Giant". This part of the park is not lost: cut off from the villa by the construction of the railway and the Genova Piazza Principe train station, it became a residential area. In 1913, the architect Gino Coppedè built the art nouveau Albergo Miramare next to the colossal statue of the Giant, which was eventually demolished in 1929.

== Gallery ==
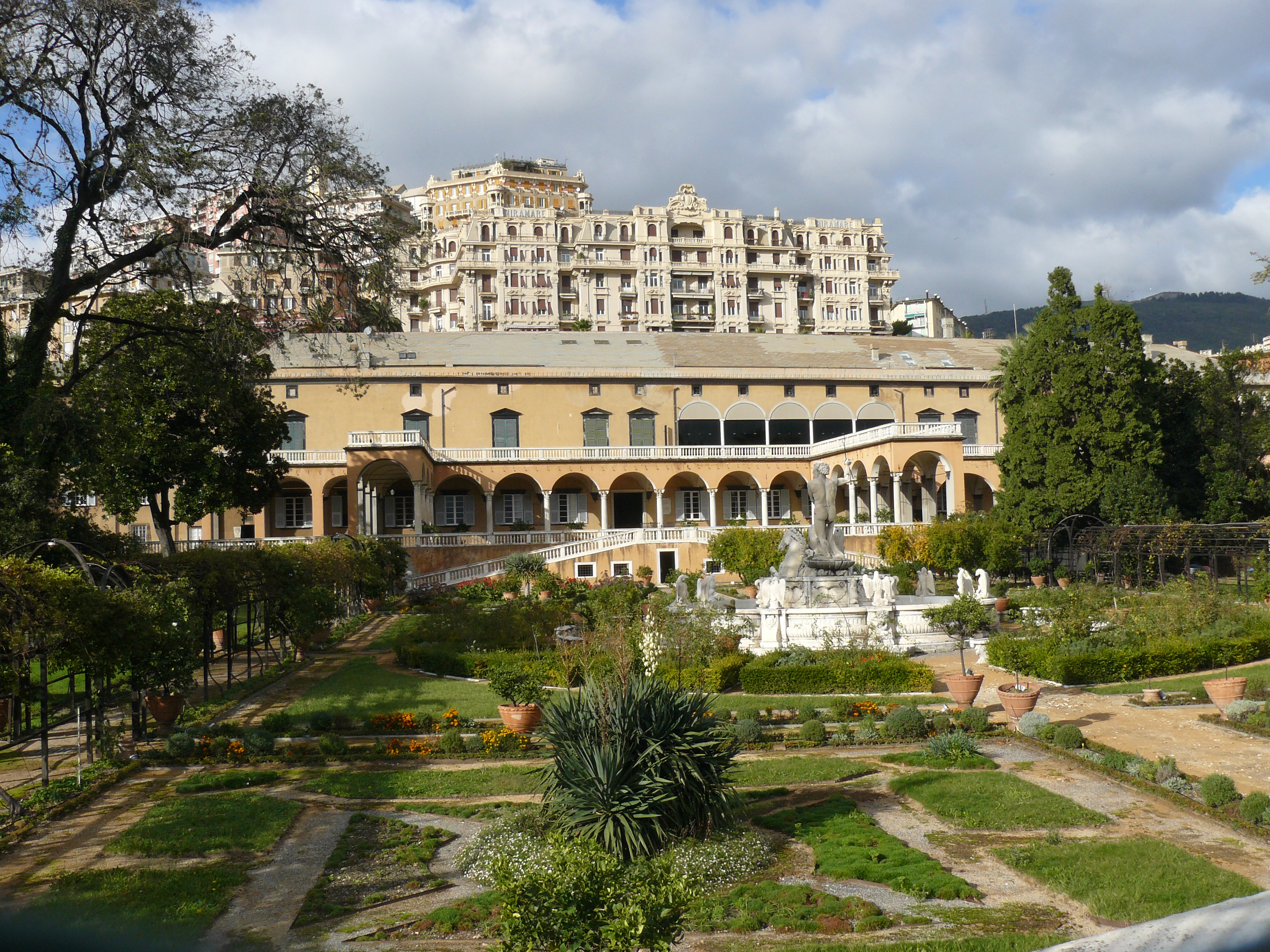

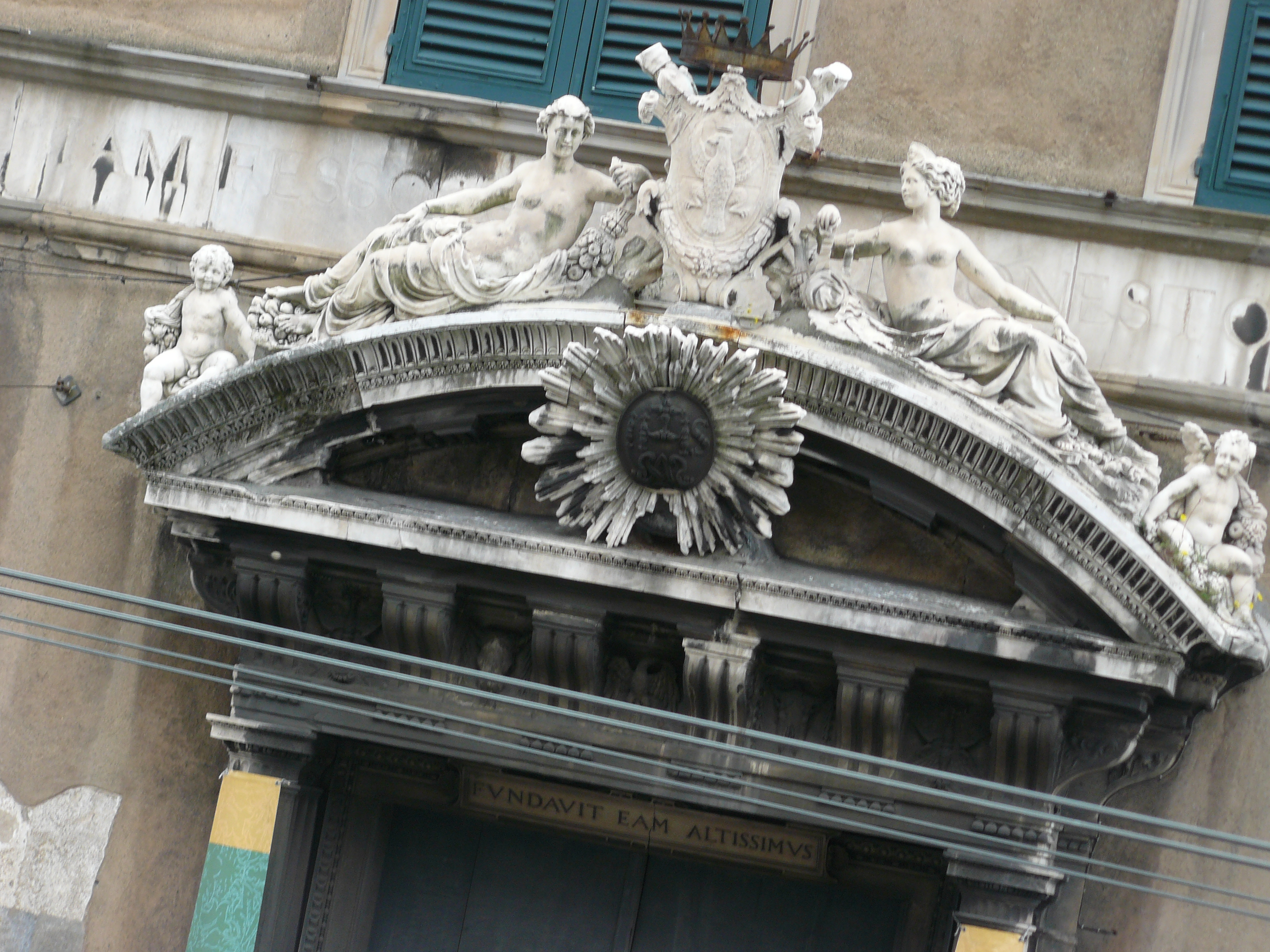

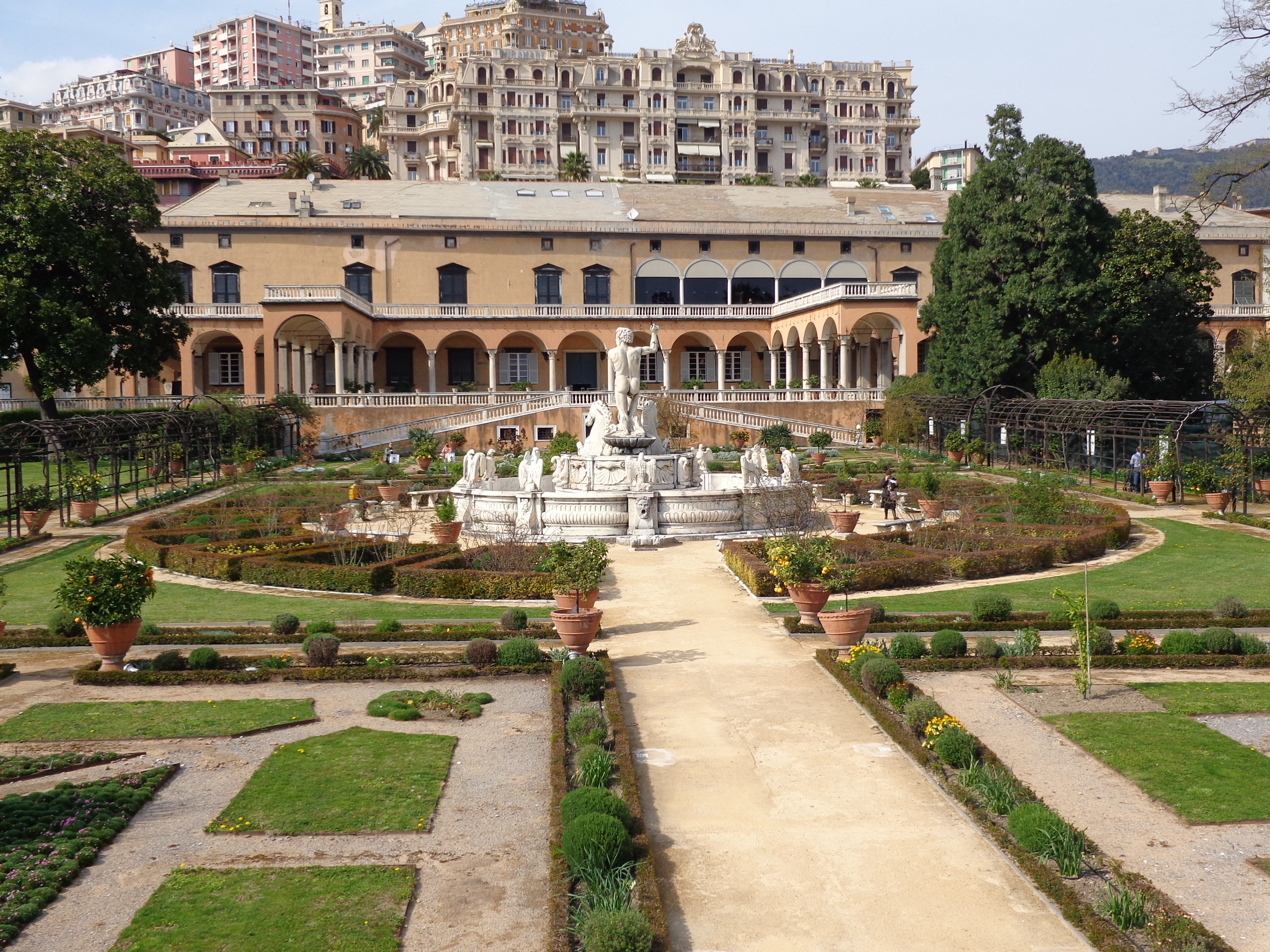

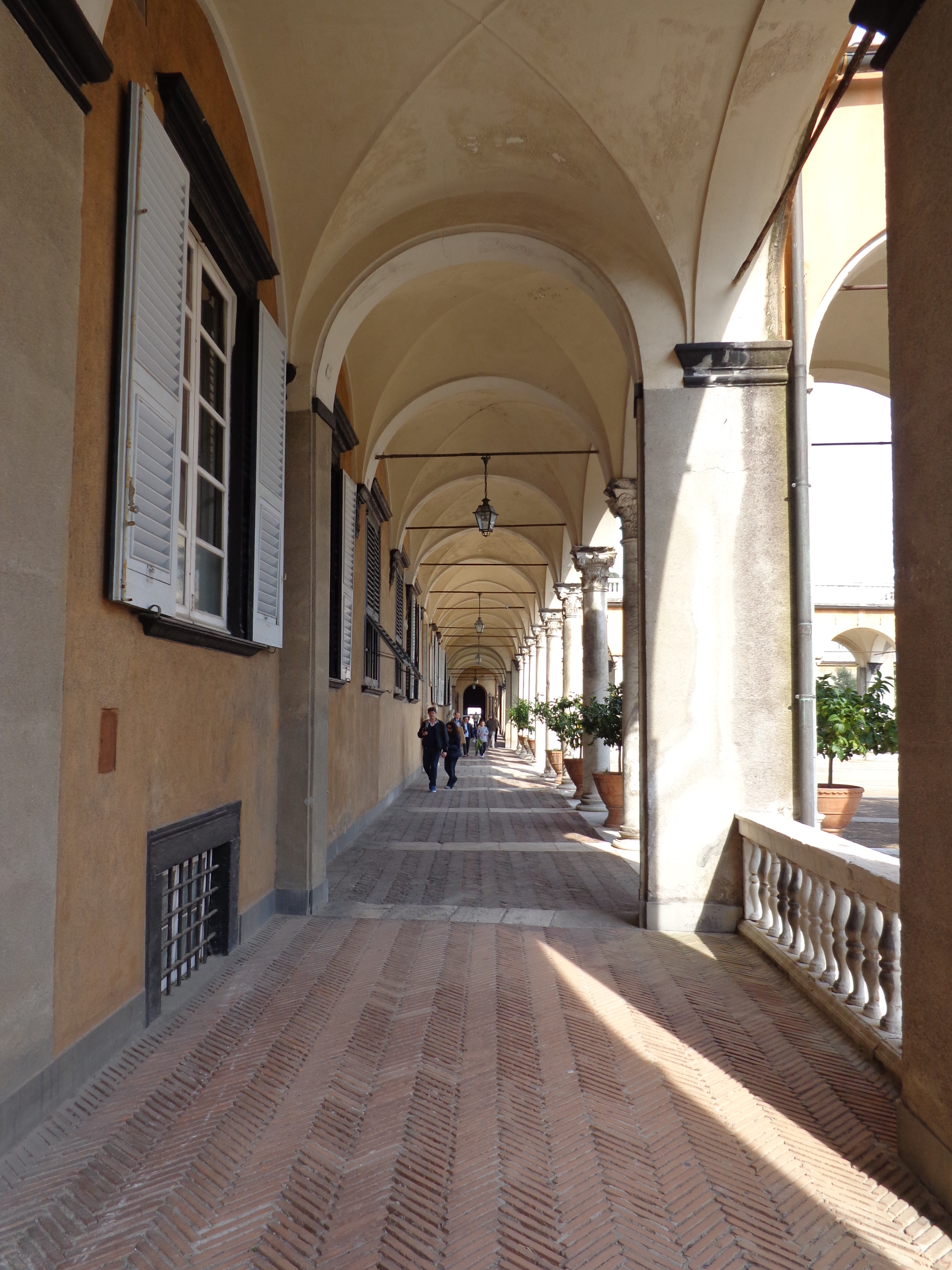

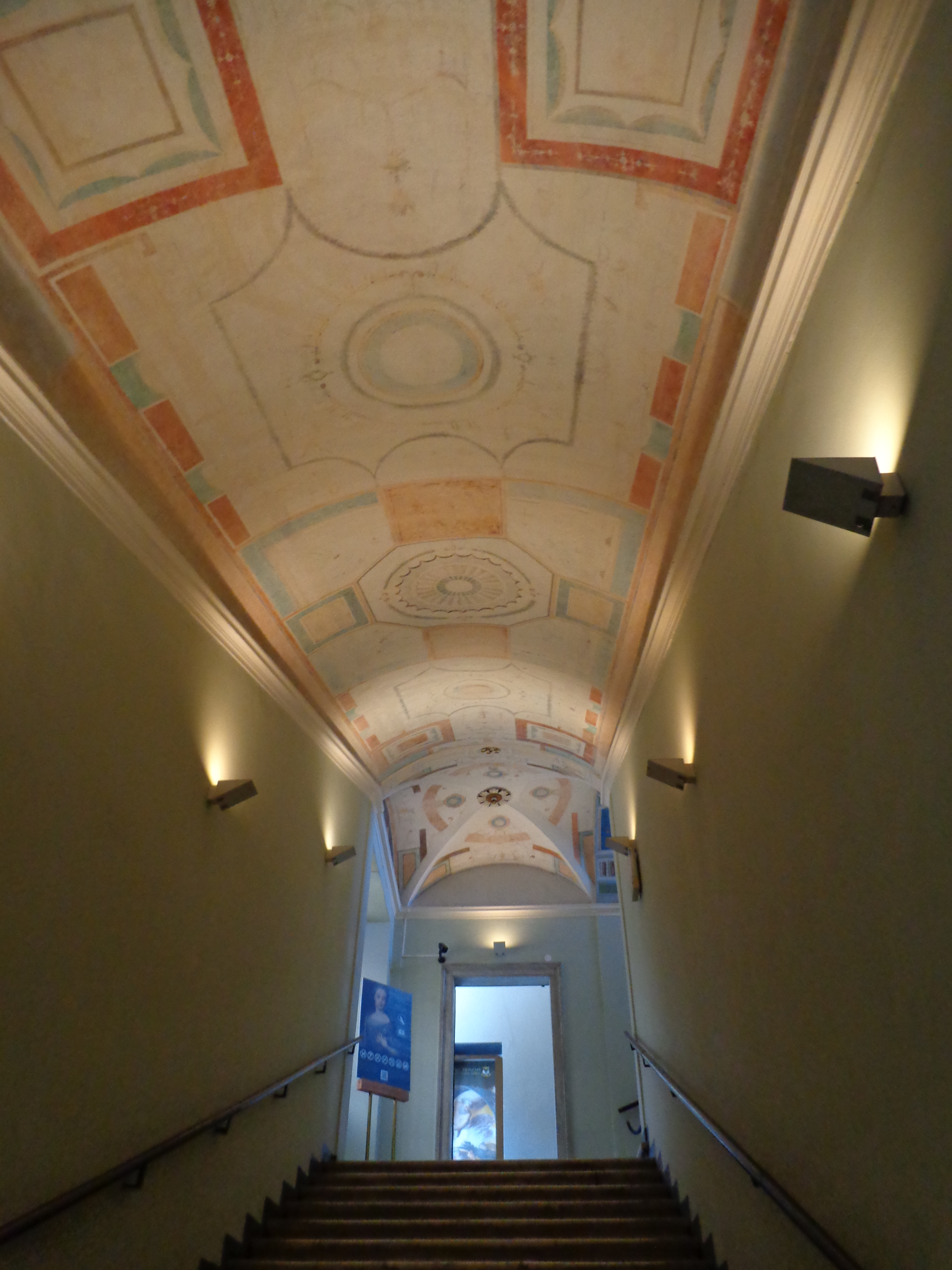

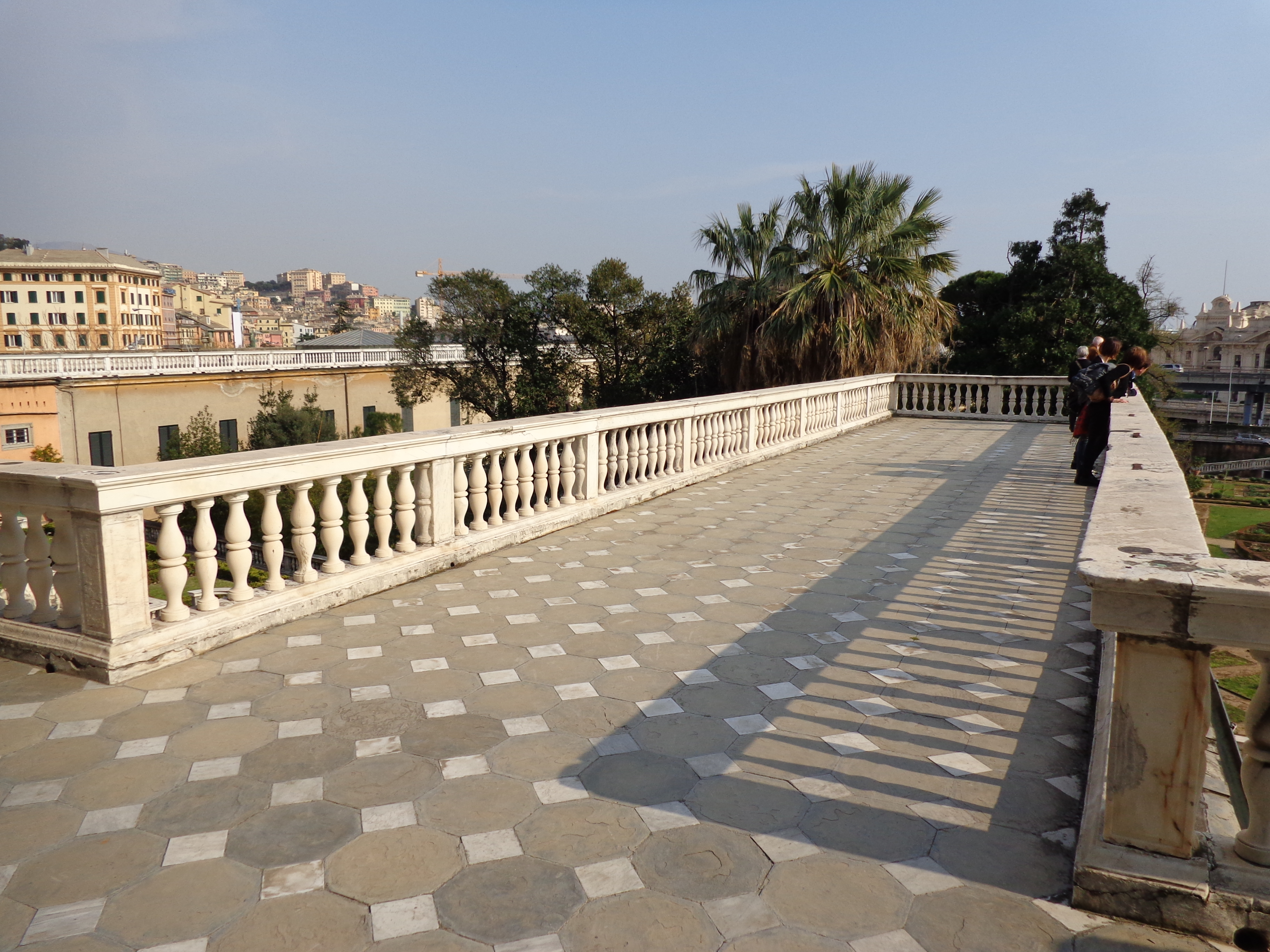

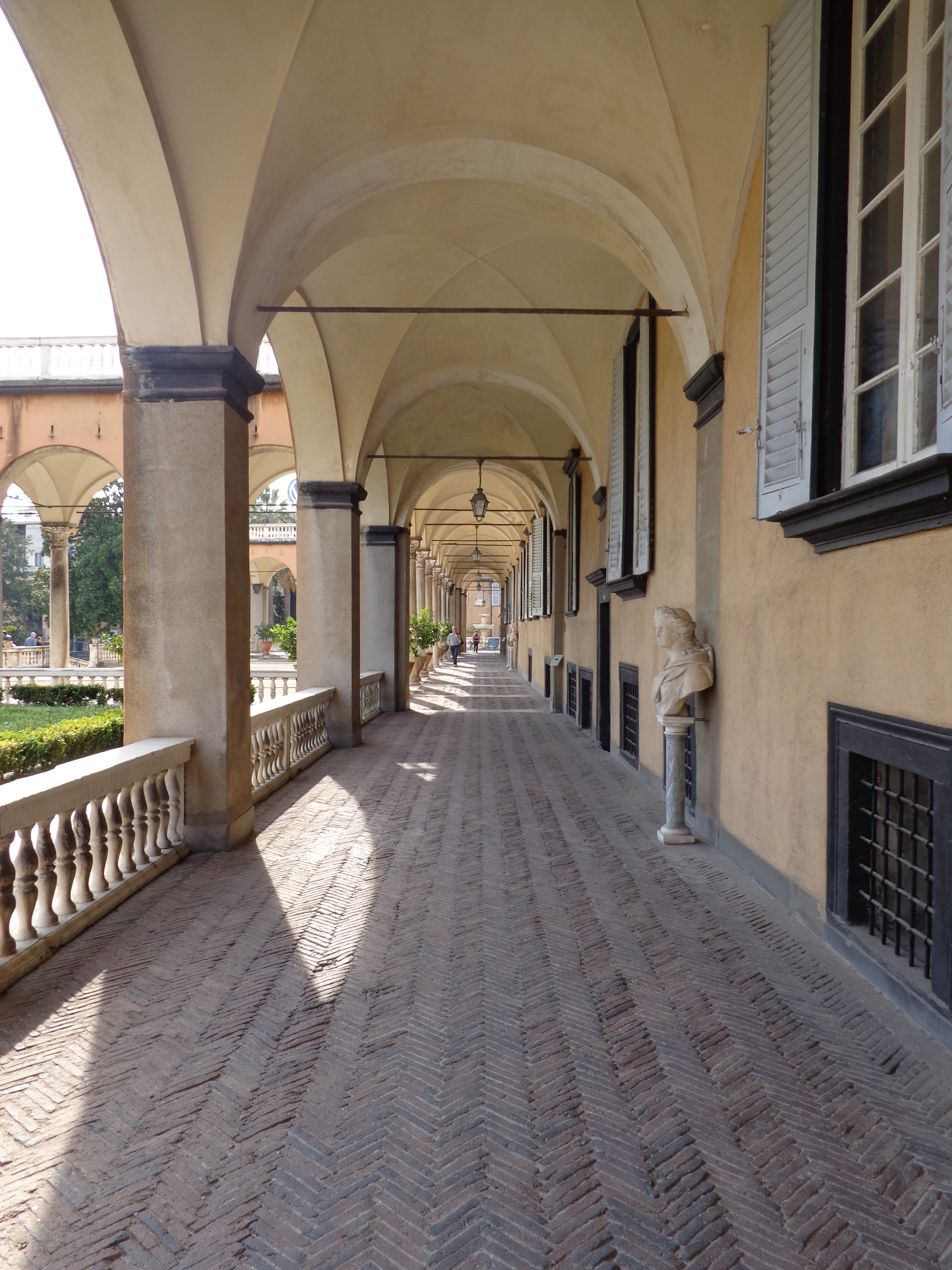

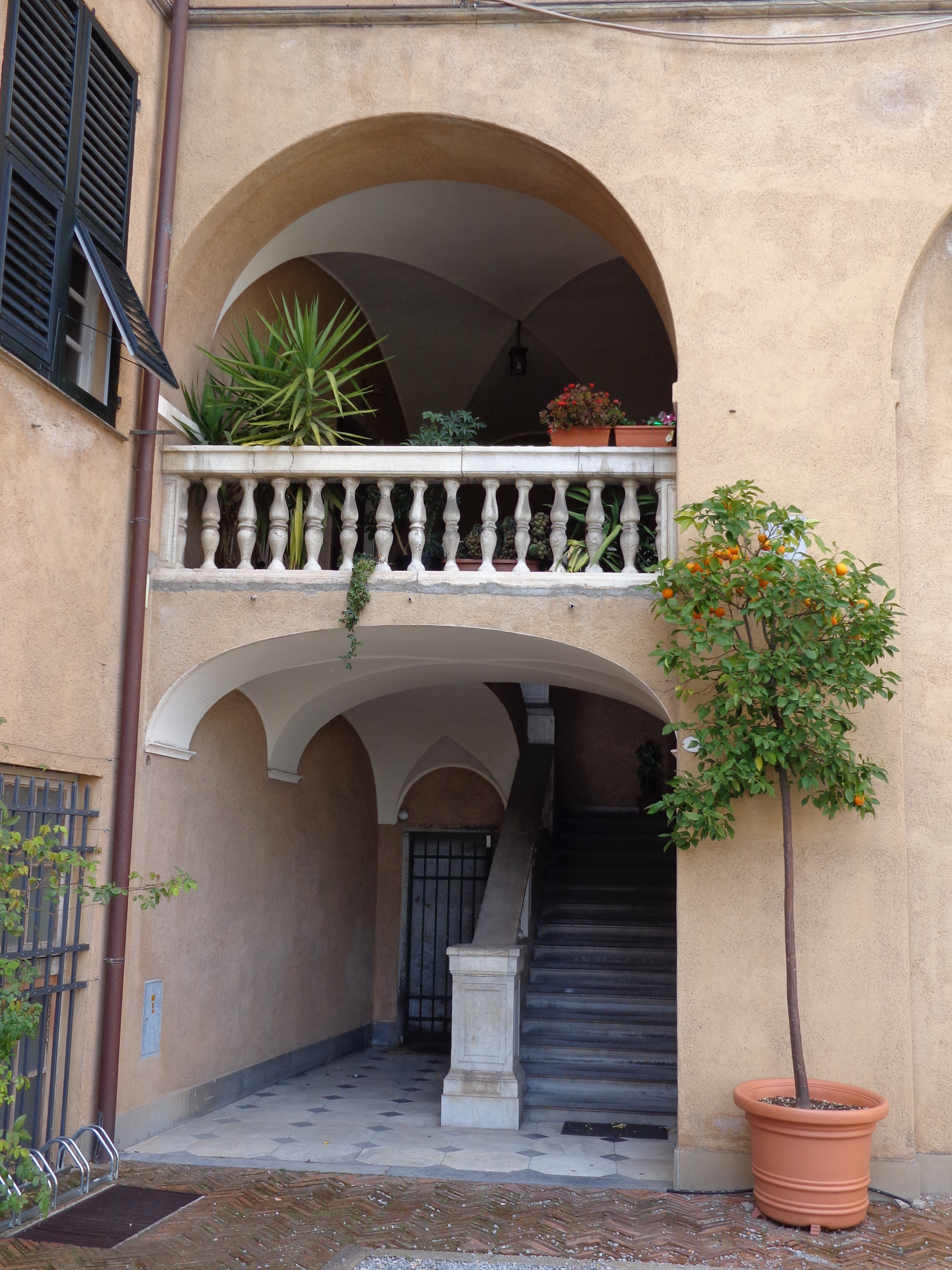

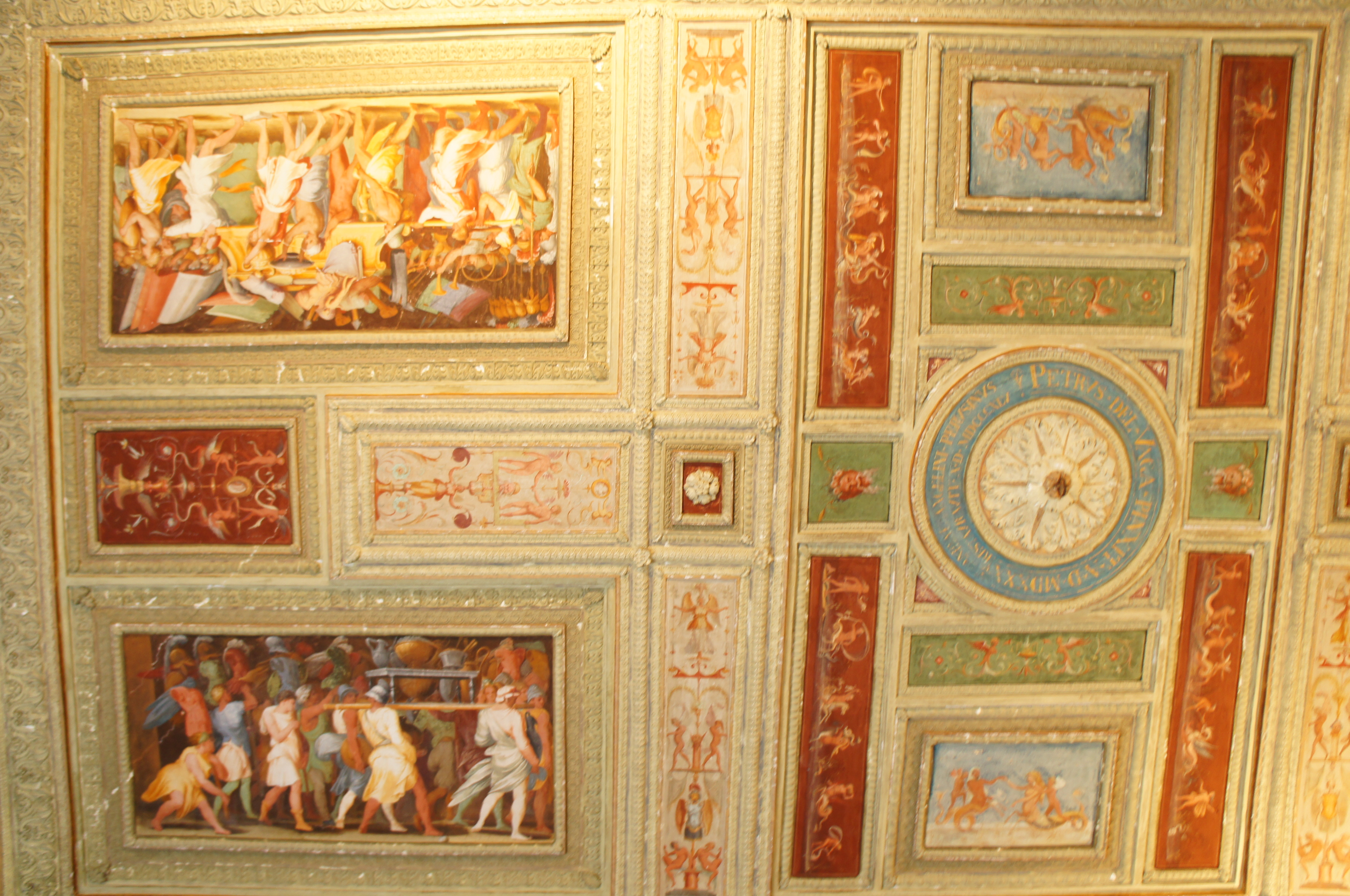

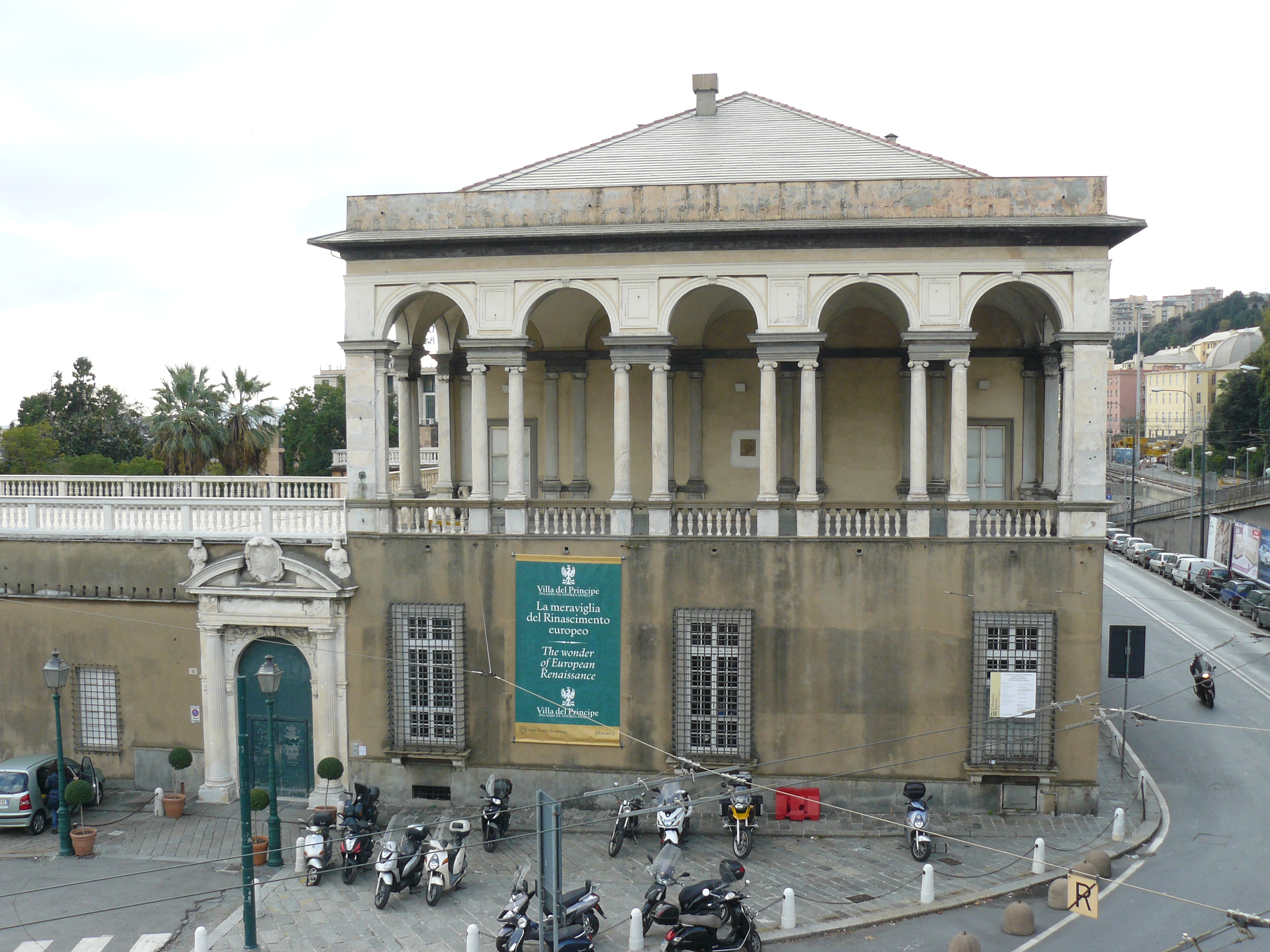

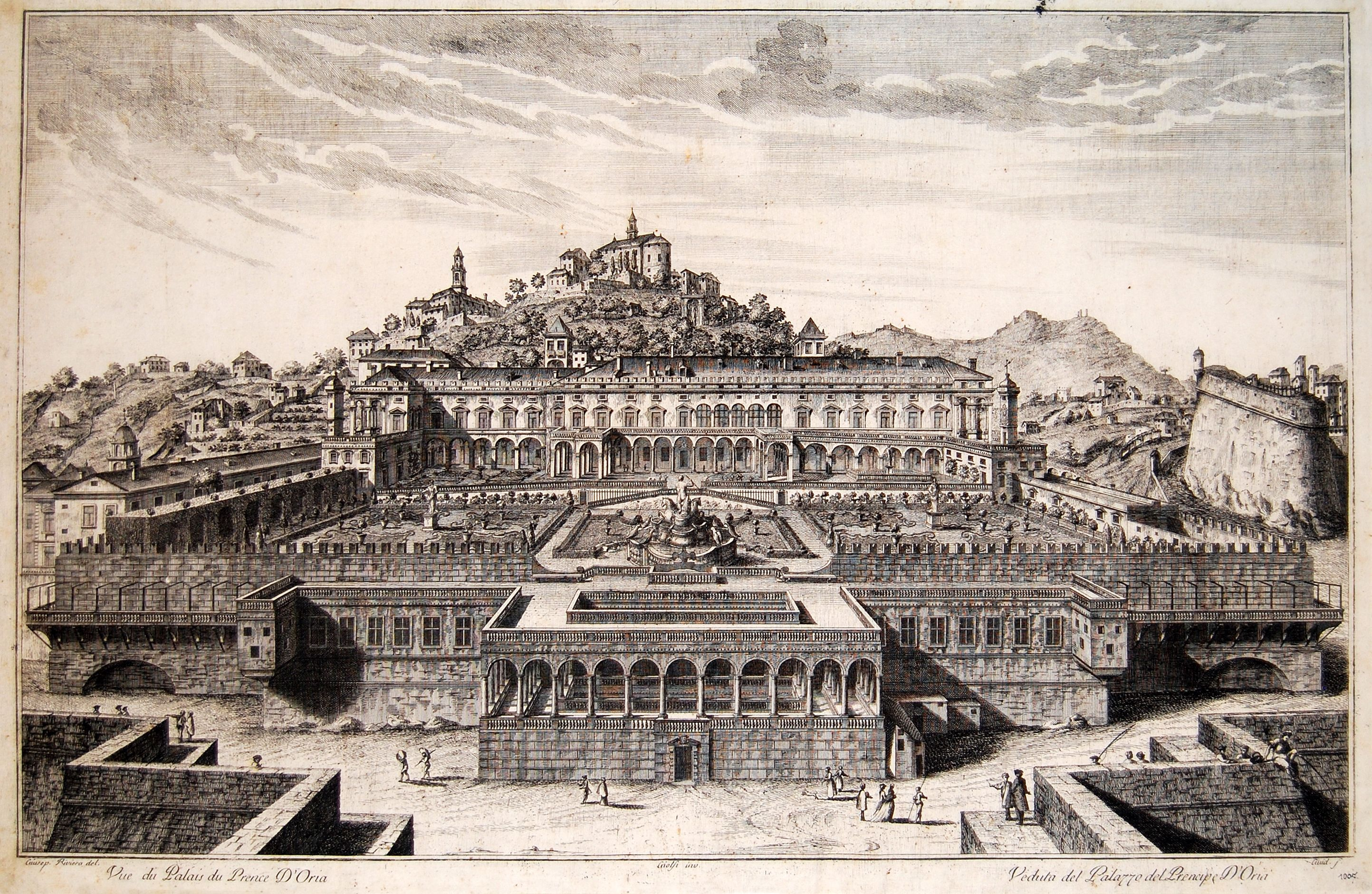

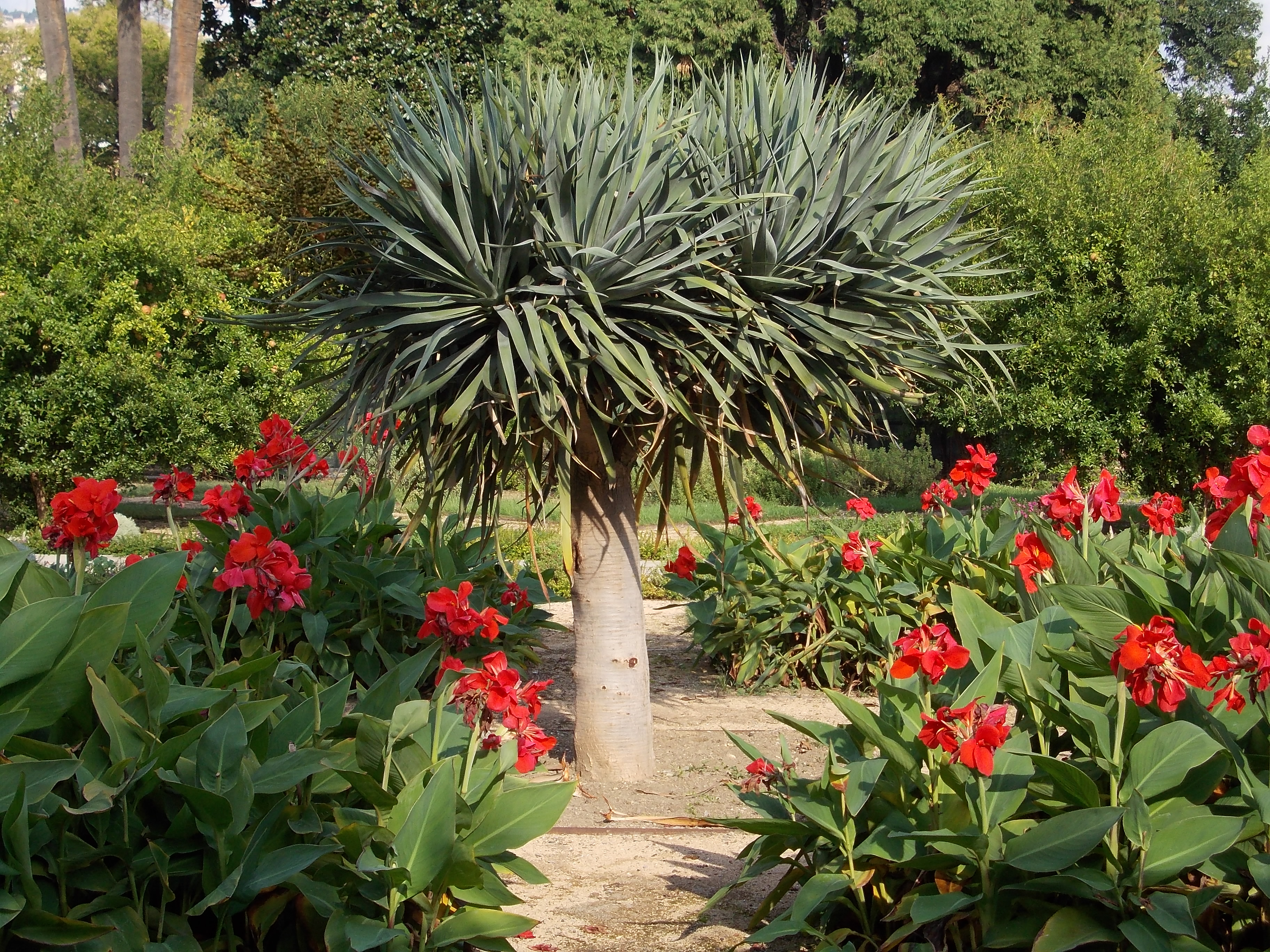

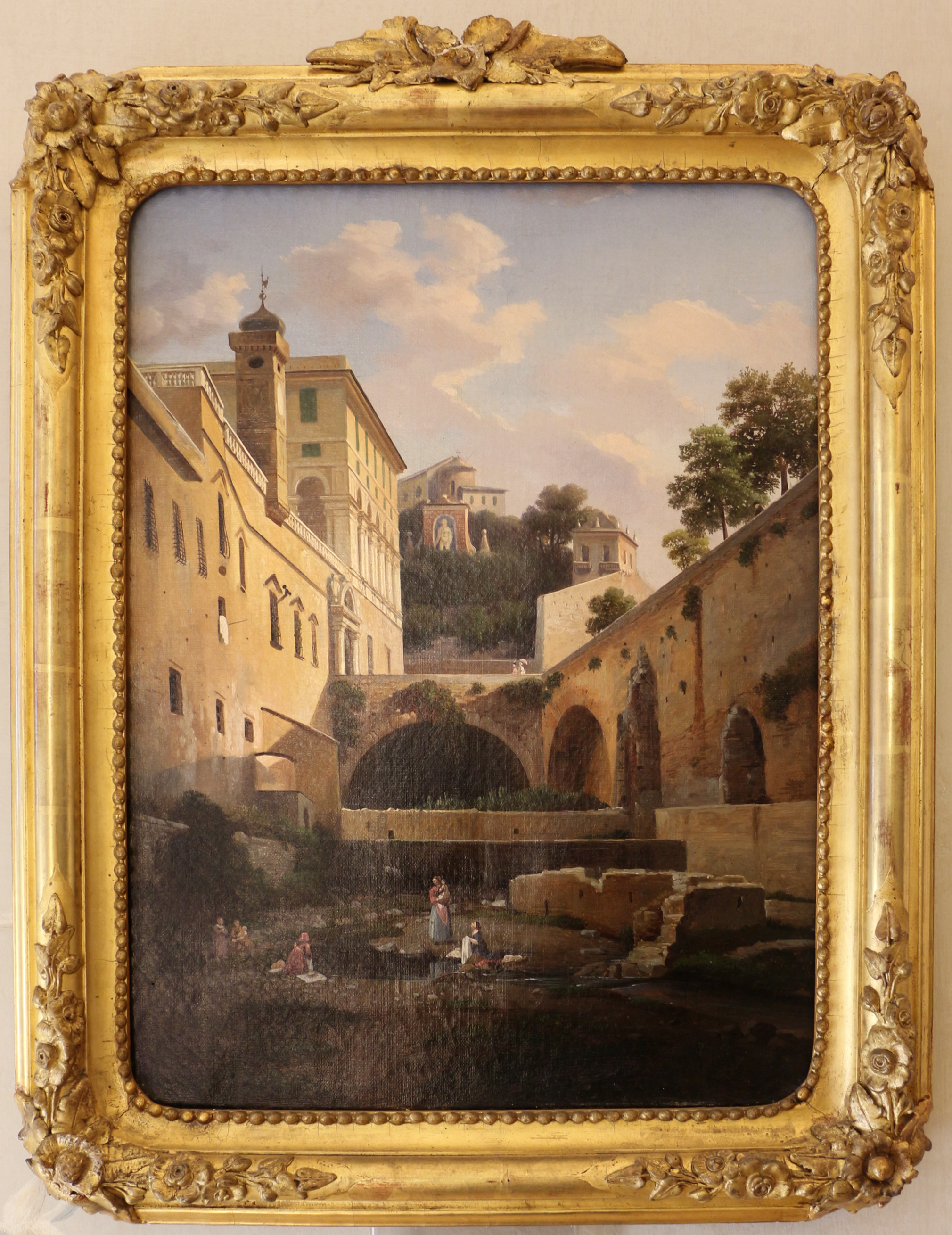

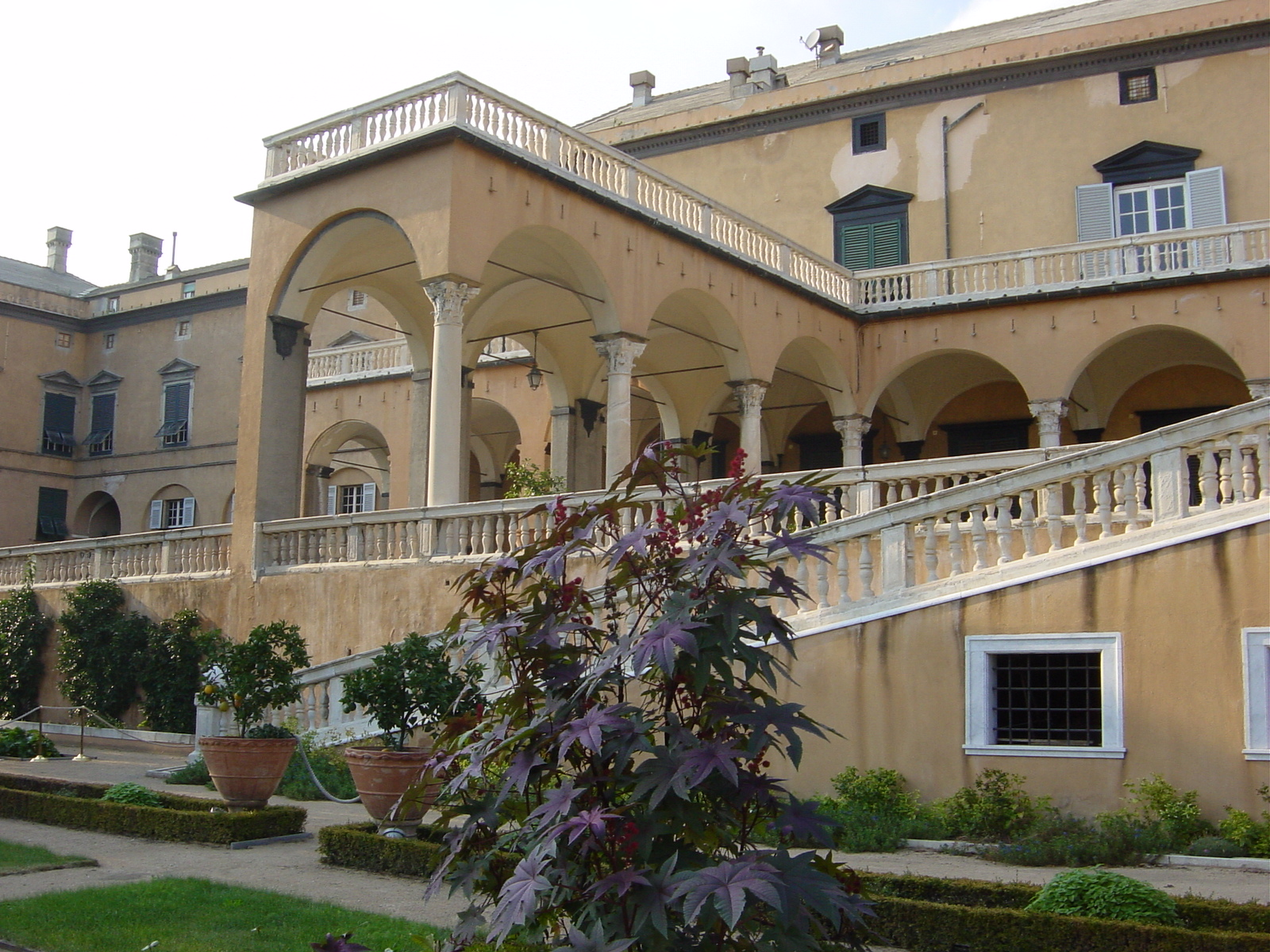

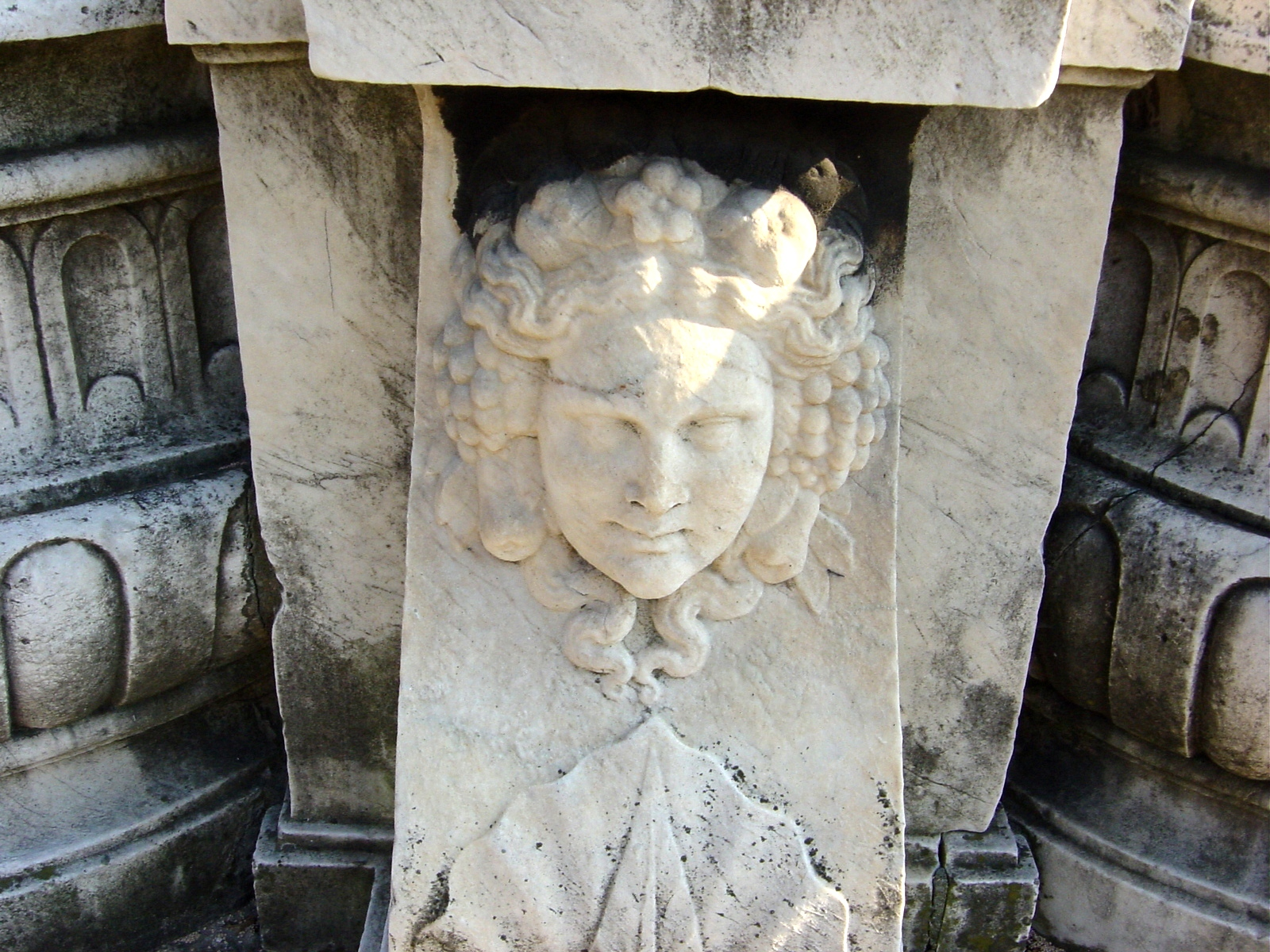

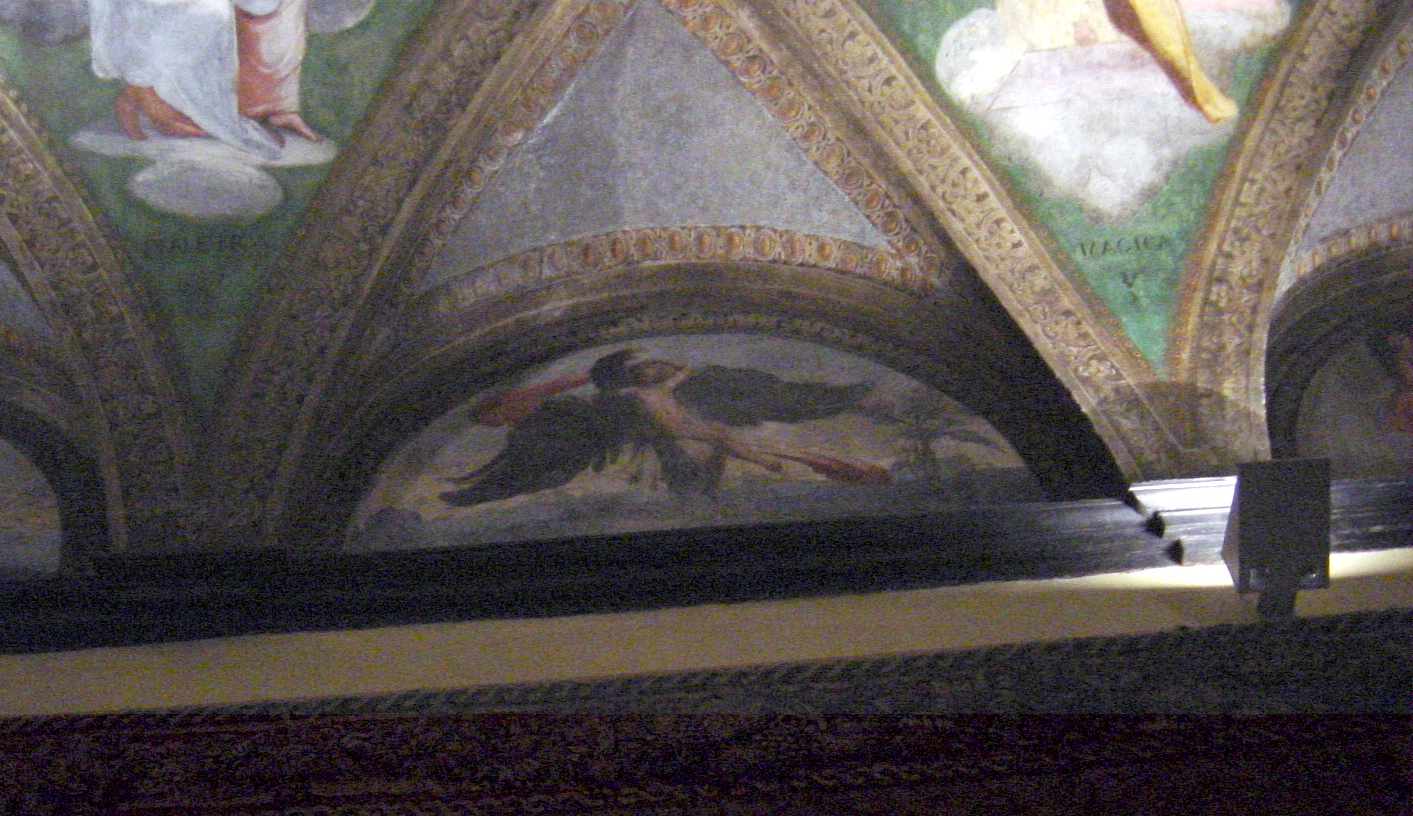

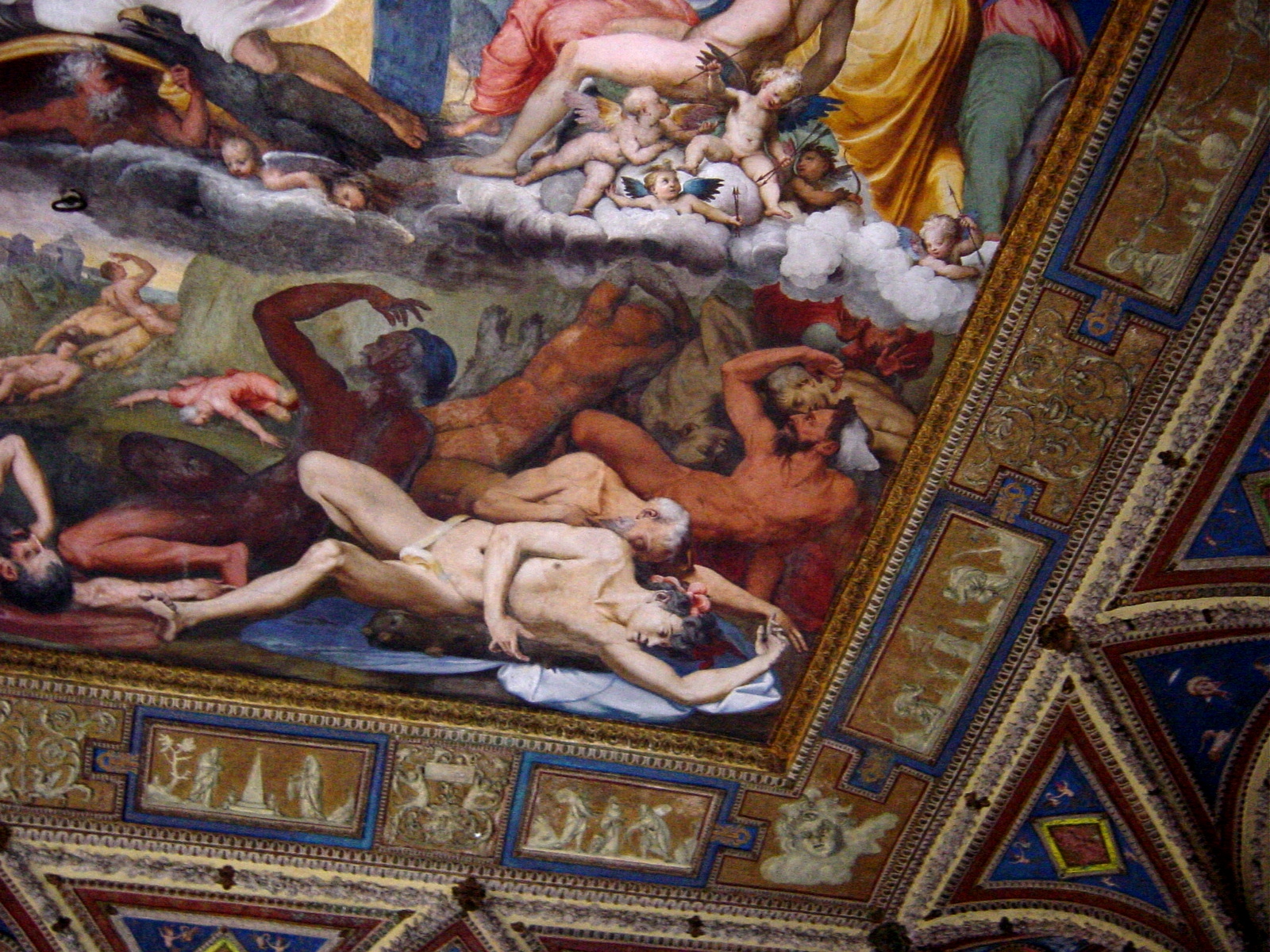

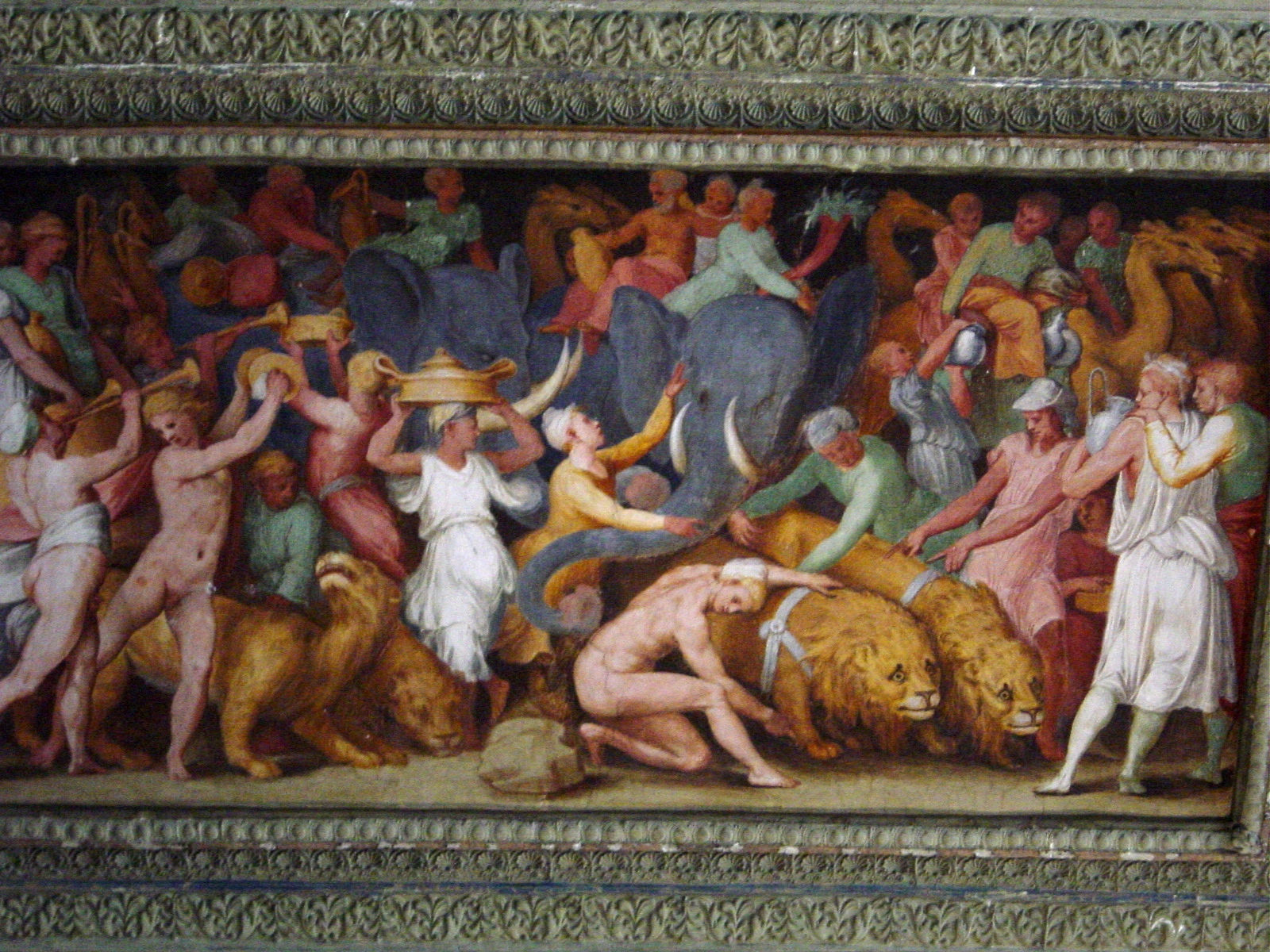

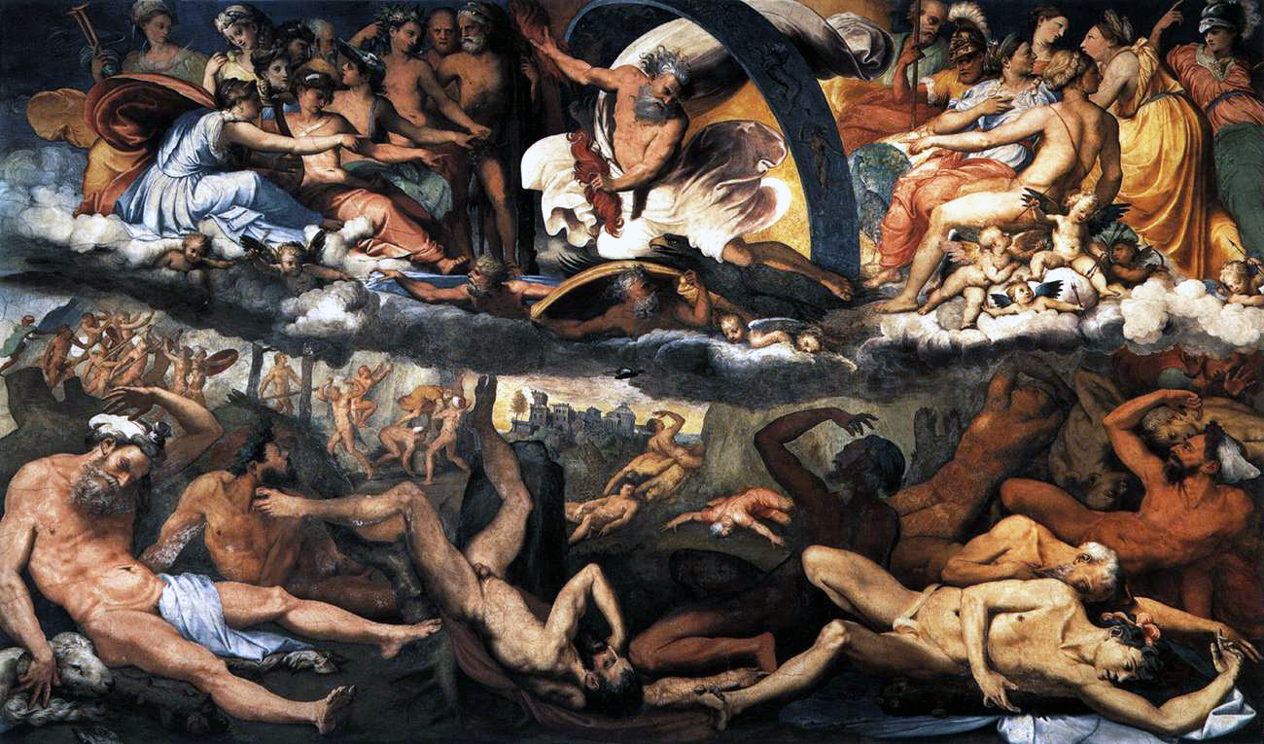

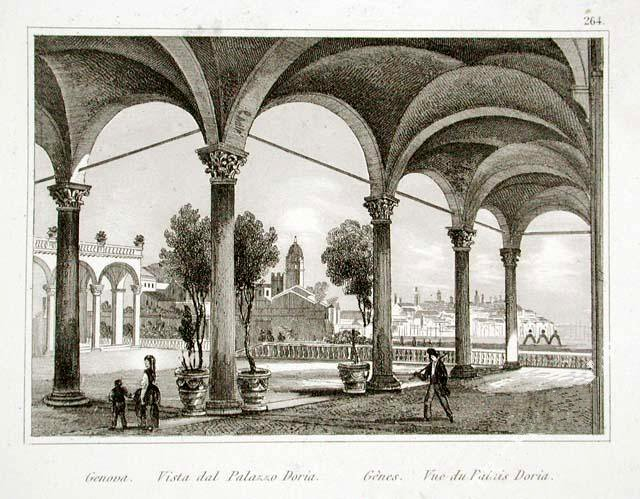

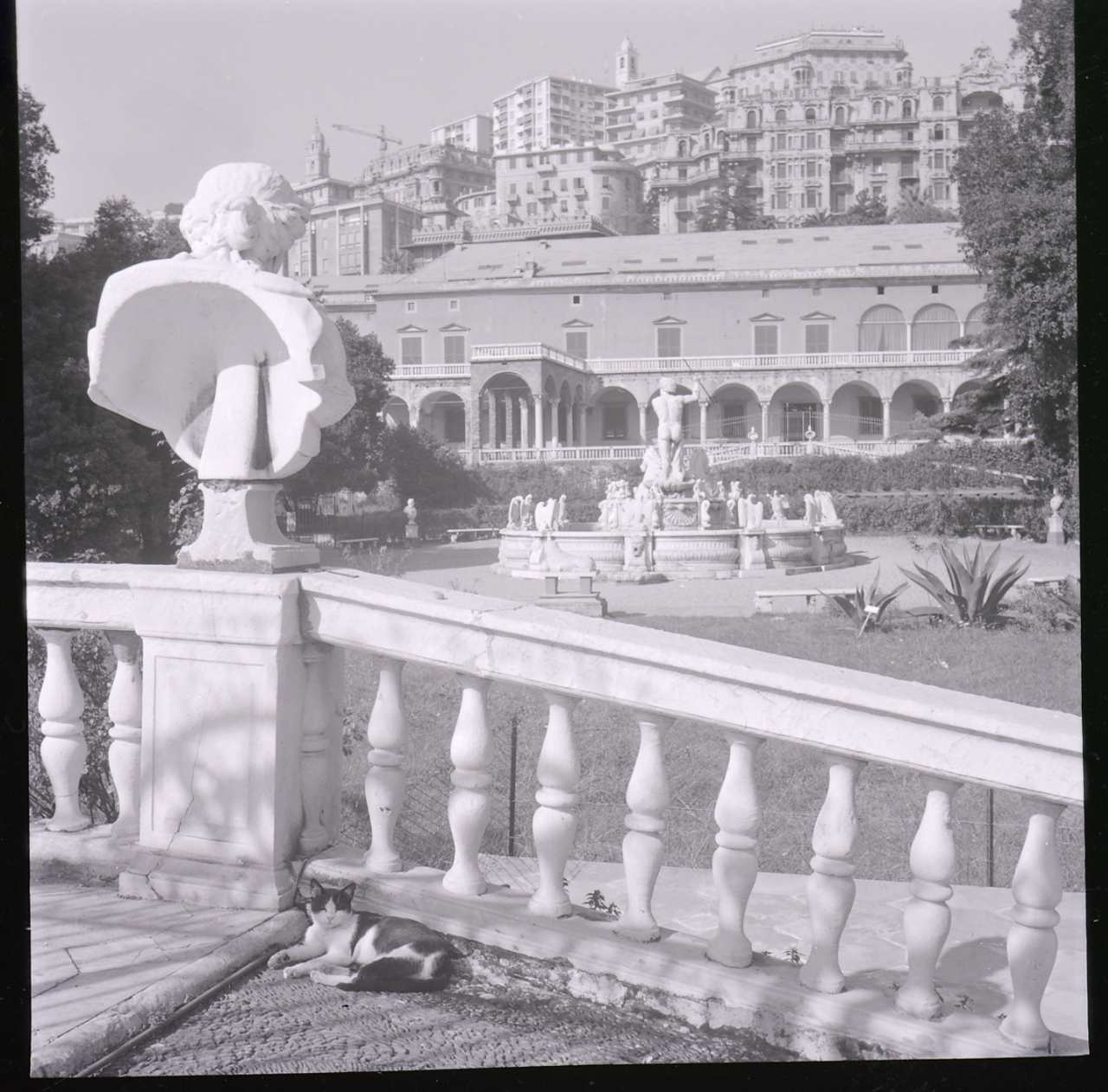

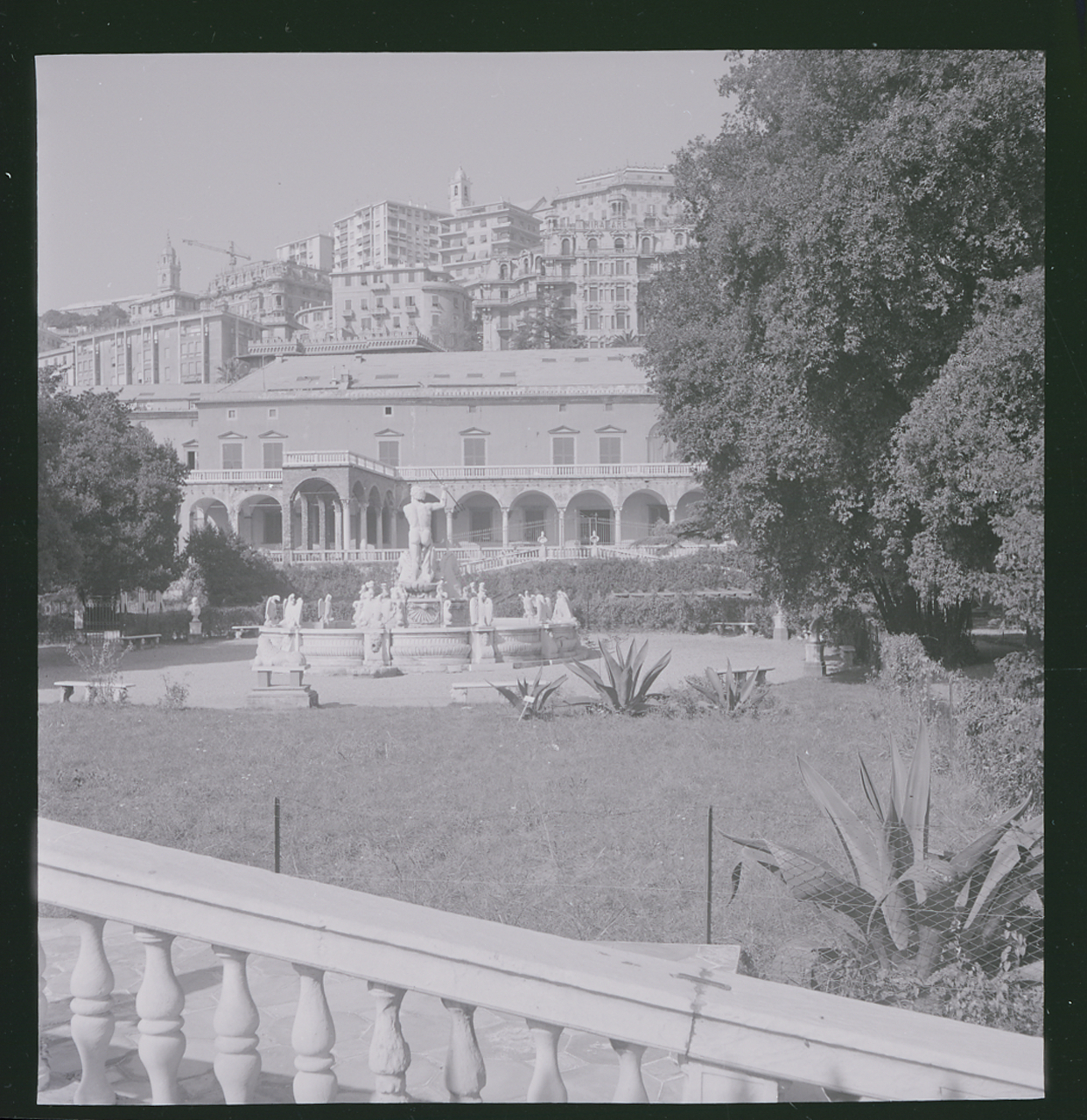

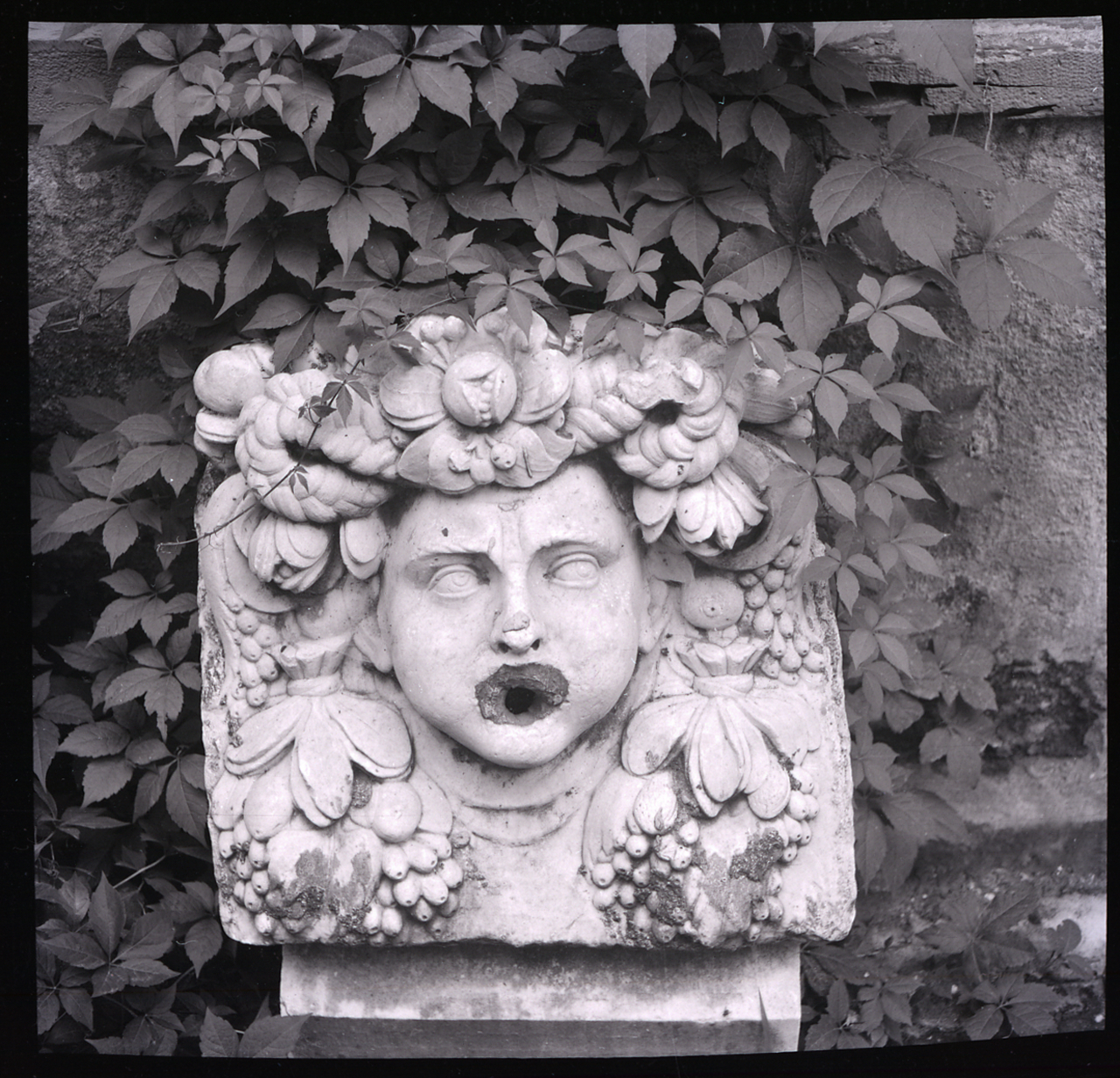

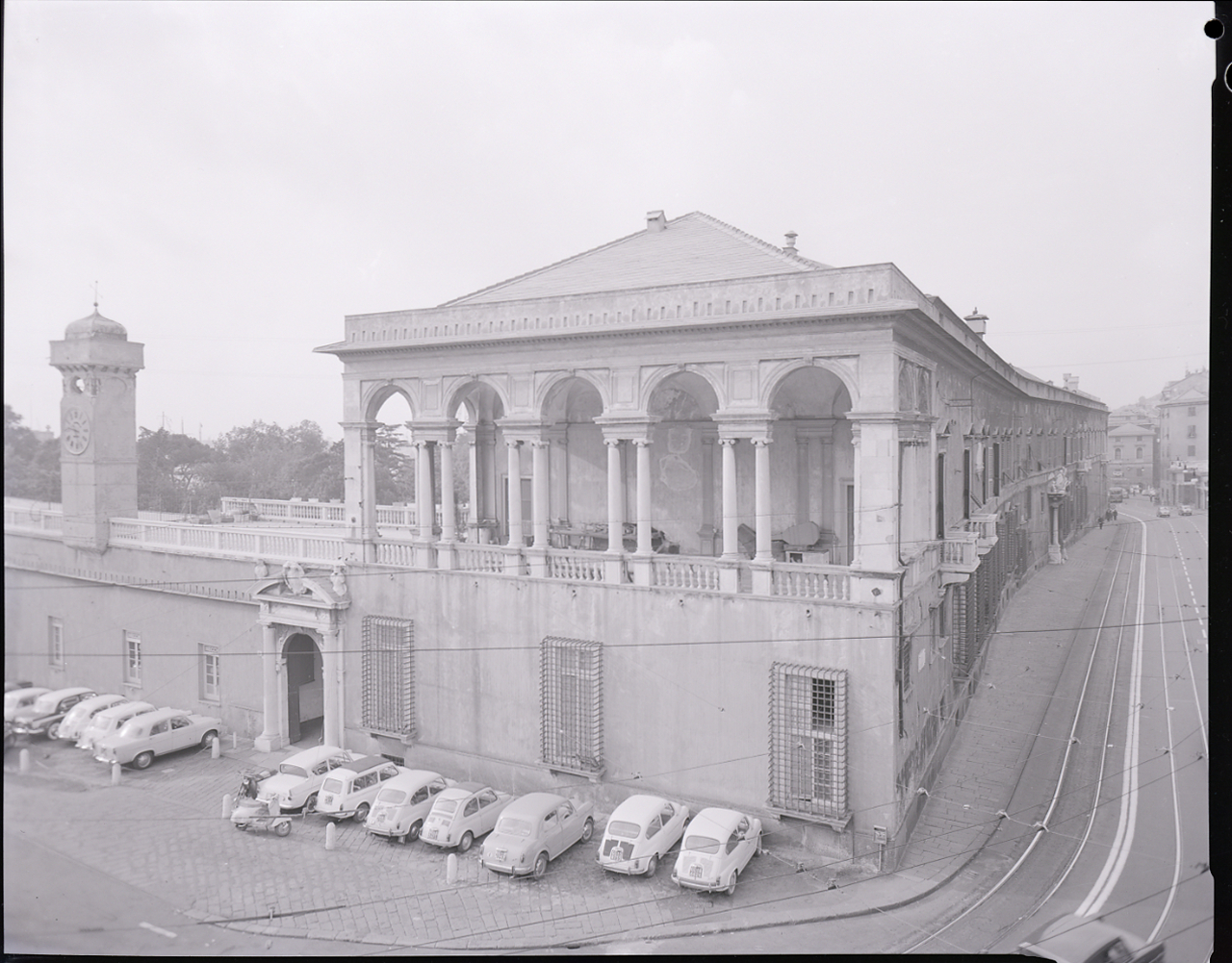

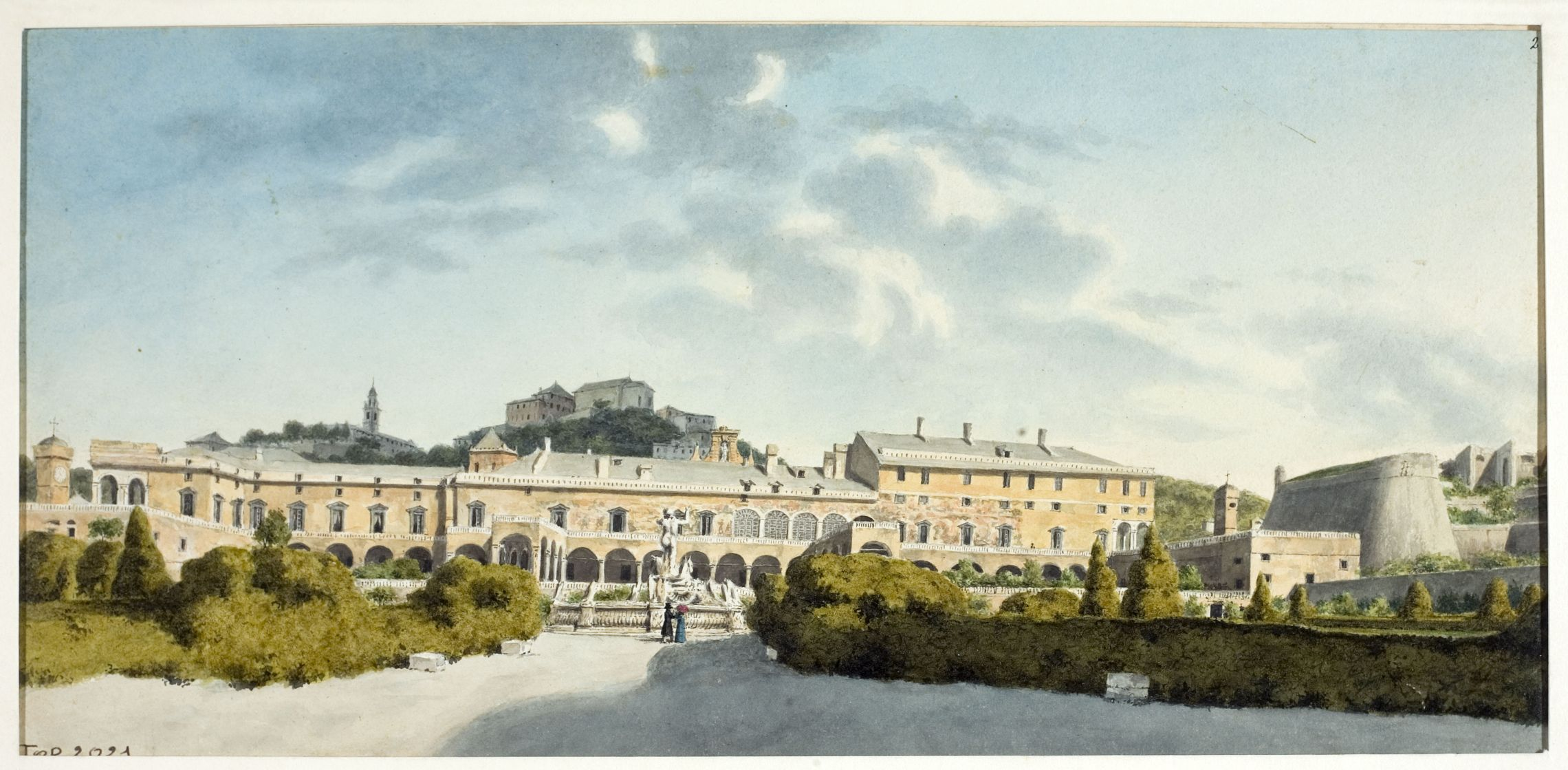

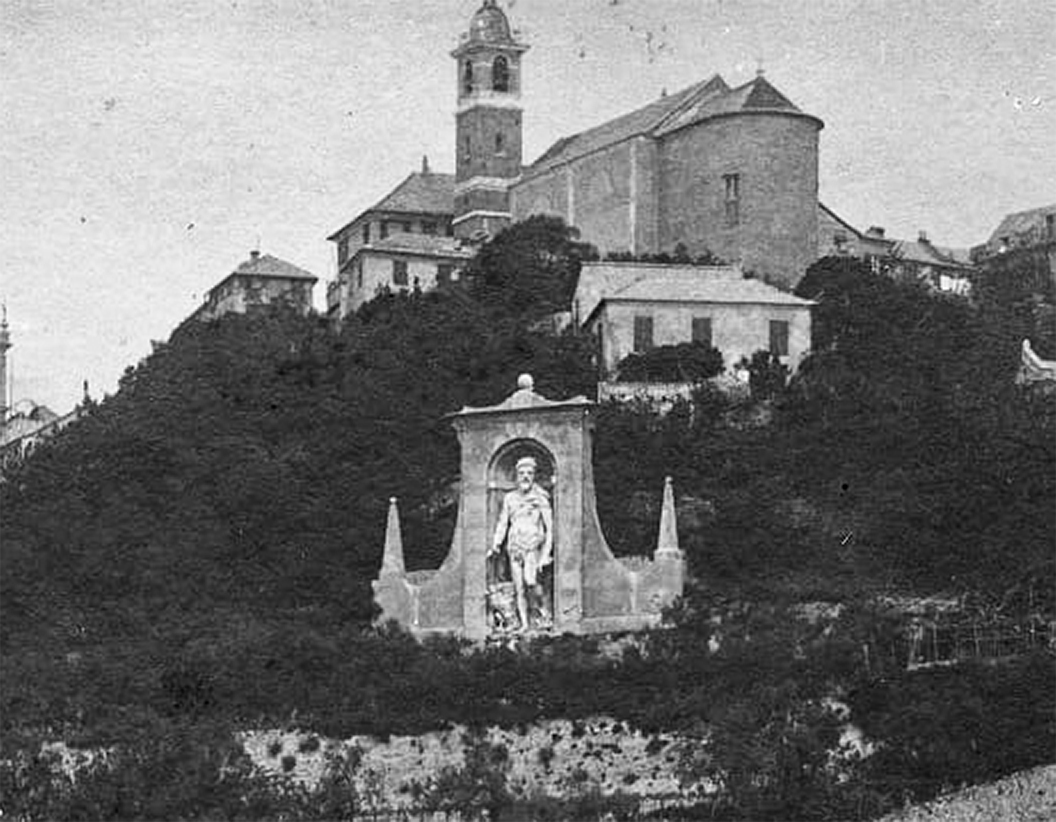

== See also ==
- Genoa
- Andrea Doria
- Doria (family)
- Republic of Genoa
- Genoese Navy
- Rolli di Genova
- Perino del Vaga
- Giovanni Ponzello
- Jupiter (Marcello Sparzo)

== Bibliography ==
- Catalogo delle Ville Genovesi. Genova: Italia Nostra, 1967, pp79–97
- Guida d'Italia, Liguria. Touring Club Italiano, 2009, pp. 171–173.
- Airaldi, Gabriella. Andrea Doria. Salerno Editore. 2015.
- Stagno, Laura. Palazzo del Principe, Villa di Andrea Doria. Genova: SAGEP, 2005. ISBN 8870589358.
