= Doria (family) =

Italian noble family

- Country: Republic of Genoa; Papal States; Kingdom of Naples; Kingdom of Sardinia; Principality of Oneglia; Lordship of Dolceacqua; Marquisate of Dolceacqua
- Current region: Italy; European Union
- Founded: 10th century
- Titles: Doge of Genoa (non-hereditary); Viceroy of Sardinia (non-hereditary); Prince of Melfi; Prince of Oneglia; Prince of Valmontone; Prince of Angri; Duke of Tursi; Duke of Eboli; Marquis of Dolceacqua; Marquis of Torriglia; Marquis of Cirié; Count of Capaccio; Count of Sassocorvaro; Count of Montaldeo; Lord of Oneglia
- Motto: Altiora peto
- Cadet branches: Doria-Pamphili-Landi

The House of Doria (Ligurian: Döia [ˈdɔːja]) originally de Auria (from de filiis Auriae), meaning "the sons of Auria", and then de Oria or d'Oria, is an old and extremely wealthy Genoese family who played a major role in the history of the Republic of Genoa and in Italy, from the 12th century to the 16th century. Numerous members of the dynasty ruled the republic first as Capitano del popolo and later as Doge.

== Origins ==
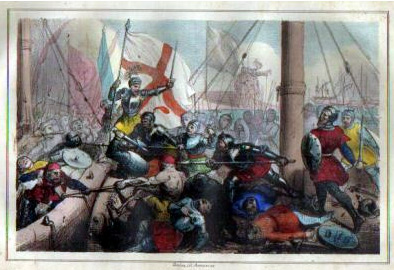
The Battle of Meloria, 1284 a major victory of Oberto Doria followed by his brother, Lamba Doria's victory in 1298 at Curzola

According to legend, a noble Genoese lady named Auria or Oria della Volta fell in love with a noble pilgrim who was going to Jerusalem for the First Crusade; his name was Arduino di Narbonne but their children were named after the mother—de Oria, the children of Oria. Arduino was a typical name of the Arduinici family of the Piemonte, some of whose members bore the title of Counts of Auriate; one might then speculate that one of the Arduinici of Auriate gave origin to this family, which suddenly appears in history as a local major power in Liguria in the late 11th century.

Documentary evidence refers to two members of that family, Martino and Genuardo, in 1110; they are called filii Auriae (the sons or children of Oria). The Doria had fiefs in Sardinia from the 12th century to the 15th century, and also in Dolceacqua, Oneglia and Portofino, in the Riviera to the west of Genoa.

== Notable members ==
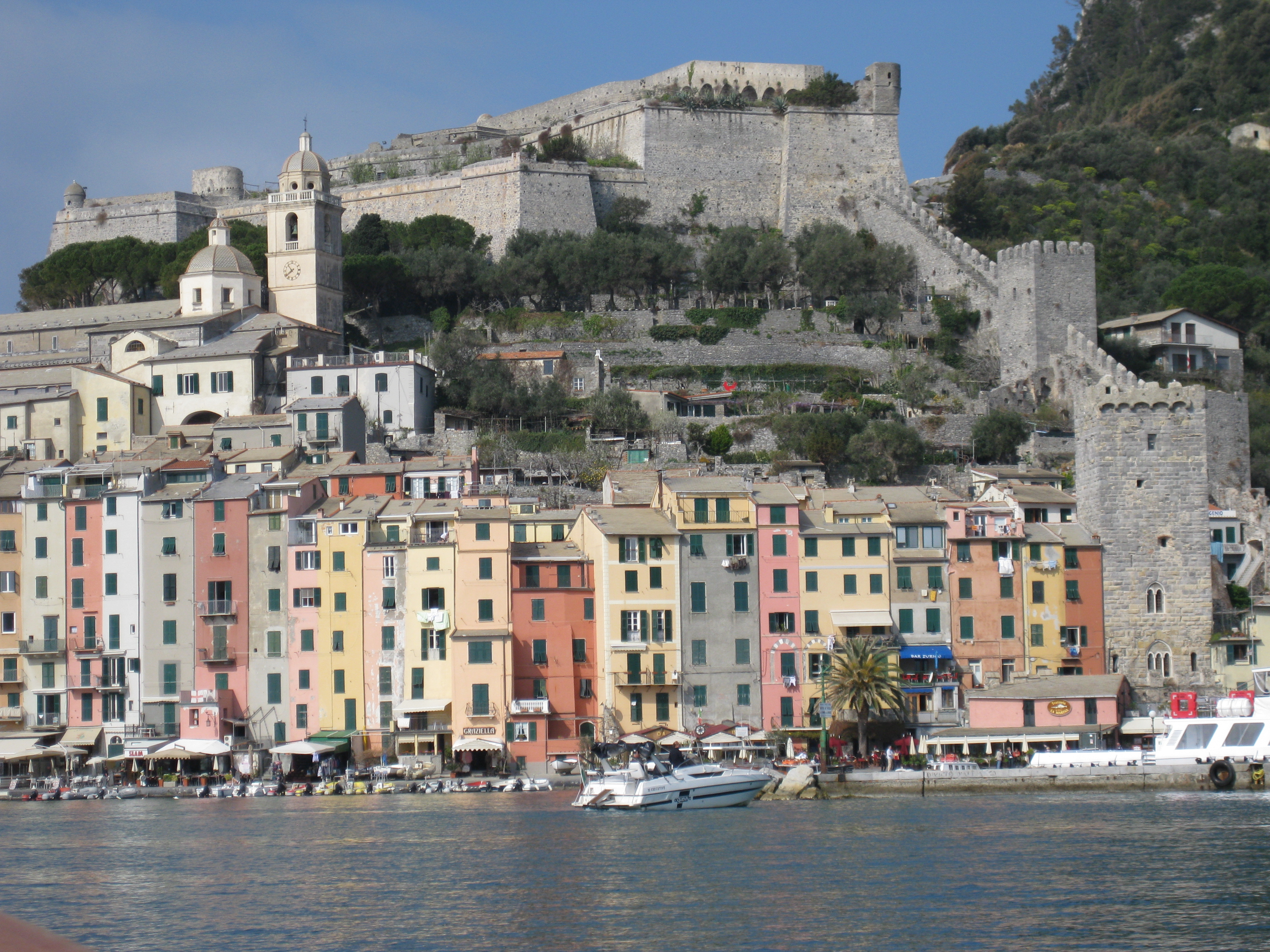
The Doria Castle (up in the photo) in Portovenere

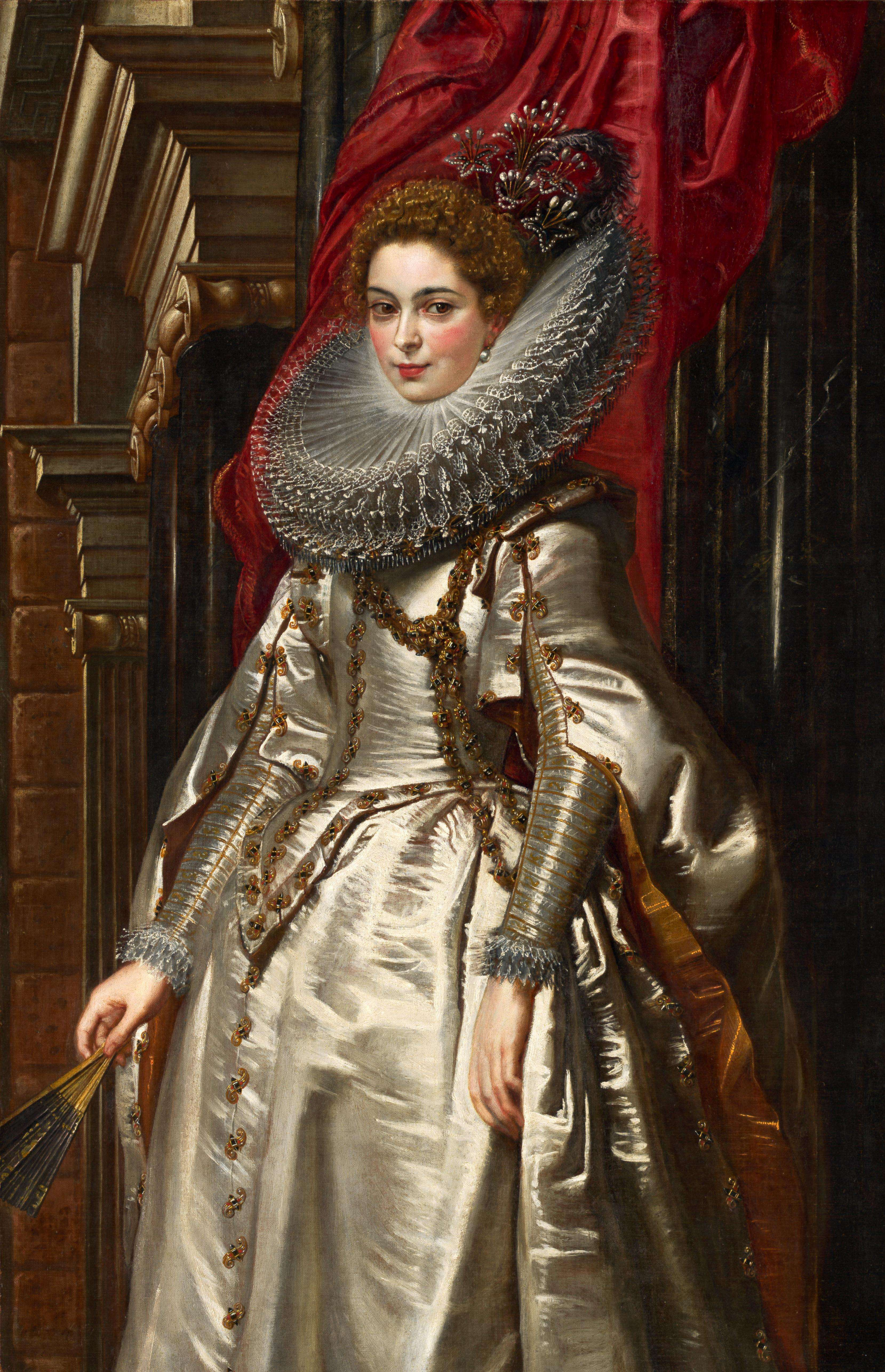
Marchesa Brigida Spinola-Doria, 1606, age 22, as painted by Peter Paul Rubens, shortly after her wedding to Giacomo Massimiliano Doria

Simon Doria lived in the late 12th century and was an admiral of the Genoese in the crusaders' assault against Saint Jean d'Acre. Percivalle Doria an infamous warlord and a well-known Provençal poet who died in 1275, was probably a member of the family. Another poet, Simon Doria was podestà of Savona and Albenga. The brothers Oberto Doria and Lamba Doria were naval commanders and politicians: Oberto was Captain of the People in Genoa and led its naval forces in the victory of La Meloria against Pisa in 1284 while Lamba won a major battle against Venetian Andrea Dandolo at Curzola in 1298. Tedisio Doria (or Teodosio) financed the expedition of Vadino and Ugolino Vivaldi in 1291. Branca Doria is mentioned by Dante in the Divine Comedy because of his treacherous murder of Michele Zanche, his father-in-law, in 1275. Brancaleone Doria ruled the Giudicato of Arborea and nearly conquered the whole of Sardinia in the late fourteenth century.

Ottone Doria commanded the 5,000 or more Genoese crossbowmen hired by the French for the Battle of Crécy against the English, in August 1346. Like many of his troops, he was killed in the battle, where the Genoese ended by being attacked by both sides. Heavy rain had made their bowstrings wet and useless (unlike those of the English longbows, they could not easily be removed) so Ottone ordered a retreat. The French cavalry saw this as cowardice and attacked them, while others were slain by the English bowmen.

A remarkable member of the family is Admiral Andrea Doria, Prince of Melfi (1466–1560), who re-established the Genoese Republic. He was perpetual censor of Genoa in 1528 and admiral to the emperor Charles V. He was created Prince of Melfi (1531) and marquis of Tursi (in the kingdom of Naples) in 1555. These titles were inherited by Giovanni Andrea Doria, son of Giannettino Doria who was a second cousin and adopted son of Andrea Doria. When Giannettino Doria was killed in 1547 during the Fieschi conspiracy against the power of Andrea Doria over Genoa, his descendants inherited the titles granted to the great admiral.

Giovanni Andrea's son Giovanni Doria was a cardinal of the Catholic Church. Other notable Dorias of the period include admiral Carlo Doria and art collector Giovanni Carlo Doria.

The family had relationships with political entities both in and out of Europe. During the attempts by the Mongol Ilkhanate ruler Abaqa to form a Franco-Mongol alliance, his strategy included a strengthening of ties with the Genoese. Many male children of the Doria family were named after foreign rulers, such as Abaga (Abaqa Khan), Casano (Ghazan Khan), and Aitone, named after Hayton, or Hethum I, king of Cilician Armenia.

=== Doges of Genoa ===
Some members of the family became doge of Genoa.

- 1537–1538: Giovanni Battista Doria
- 1579–1581: Nicolò Doria
- 1601–1603: Agostino Doria
- 1621: Ambrogio Doria
- 1633–1635: Giovanni Stefano Doria
- 1793–1795: Giuseppe Maria Doria

== Titled branches ==
Members of the Doria family bore the titles of Prince of Melfi (Doria-Pamphili branch), of Princes of Centola (Doria d'Angri branch), of Counts of Montaldeo, Marquesses of Ciriè e del Maro, Marquesses of San Columbano, Lords of Oneglia, among many others. Agnatic members of the family are marchesi al cognome, that is, bear the title of marquess attached to the family name as a courtesy title.

Non-agnatic princely branches like the Colonna-Doria are still flourishing. There are also titled branches outside Italy, such as the Porrata Doria family in Spain, which rank as marquesses.

== Role in the great explorations ==
The Doria clan helped finance the Portuguese and Spanish navigations in the late 15th and 16th centuries. Francesco Doria, a banker at Seville, financed Christopher Columbus's expeditions, and his son Aleramo Doria was a banker to King John III of Portugal until 1556. Finally, Aleramo's daughter Clemenza Doria was one of the earliest settlers in the 16th-century Portuguese colonization of Brazil. Clemenza Doria married twice; her second husband was Fernão Vaz da Costa (c. 1520–1567), son of Portuguese Chief Justice Cristóvão da Costa and a great-grandson of the legendary navigator Soeiro da Costa; they originated the Costa Doria family which is still thriving today as one of their members, José Carlos Aleluia [da Costa Doria], is a representative in the Brazilian congress, and businessman João Doria Jr. or João Agripino da Costa Doria III was the mayor of the city of São Paulo (2017–2018) and the governor of the State of São Paulo (2019–2022).

Lodisio Doria, a Genoese knight and merchant, was a descendant of several branches of the Doria family of Genoa, primarily the Oneglia lineage, as documented in Natale Battilana's 19th-century genealogical study of old Genoese families, Genealogie delle Famiglie Nobili di Genova. He was inducted into the Order of Christ (Portugal), as were several of his descendants, and later settled on the island of Madeira.

His lineage includes the Teixeira Doria family, Lords of Pena d’Aguia, and the França Doria family, a cadet branch of the former. Although both branches share the Portuguese navigator and explorer Tristão Vaz Teixeira as a common ancestor, the Teixeira Doria represent the agnatic line directly descending from him. The França Doria branch is headed by the Count of Calçada, with a junior branch led by the Viscount of Torre Bela.

== In literature ==
The name Doria was used in Cornelia Funke's Inkheart series (specifically, the book Inkdeath) for a semi-main character who eventually fell in love with the teenage heroine.

A character in Ada Palmer's near-future sci-fi series Terra Ignota is named Julia Doria Pamphili, and is implied to be descended from the historical Doria family.

== See also ==
- Doria Pamphilj Gallery
- Doria-Pamphili-Landi
- Ambrosio Spinola, marqués de los Balbases, Ambrosio Spinola Doria
- Doge of Genoa
