= Doria-Pamphili-Landi =

Princely Roman family of Genoese extraction

Doria Pamphilj Landi Doria Pamphilj
- Noble house
- Parent house: House of Doria (Genoa); House of Pamphilj (Rome); House of Landi (Emilia)
- Country: Italy
- Founded: 1610
- Founder: Giovanni Andrea II Doria
- Final head: Orietta Doria Pamphilj
- Titles: "Prince of Melfi"; "Prince of Borgotaro"; "Prince of Meldola"; "Duke of Montelanico"; "Marquis of Torriglia"
- Style: His Excellency (Cardinal)
- Motto: Optima Pandes
- Estates: Palazzo Doria Pamphilj (Rome); Collegio Innocenziano (Rome); Villa del Principe (Genoa); Palazzo di San Matteo (Genoa)

The House of Doria Pamphilj Landi (also called simply Doria Pamphilj) was a princely Roman family of Genoese extraction. Legend has it that the origins of the Doria family date from the early 11th century, but the authentic pedigree is traced to Ansaldo d'Oria, consul of Genoa in the 12th century. The descent of the several Doria family lines in Genoa is well-known and is described in Natale Battilana's 19th-century genealogical study of old Genoese families.

The Doria Pamphili Landi princely family was a sub-branch of the Doria di Oneglia branch: in 1291, two Doria brothers bought the lordship of Oneglia, which was co-owned by their descendants until the late 15th century. Admiral Andrea Doria was descended from a Doria di Oneglia, Genoese soldier Aitone Doria (also called Antonio Doria), who fought for the French at the Battle of Crécy.

== Famous members ==
Famous members include Andrea Doria and Cardinal Giovanni Battista Pamphilj, who rose to the Papacy as Pope Innocent X.

The marquisate of Civiez and the county of Cavallamonte were conferred on the family in 1576, the duchy of Tursi in 1594, the principality of Avella in 1607, the duchy of Avigliano in 1613, and the principality of Meldola in 1671. In 1760, the title of Reichsfürst or prince of the Holy Roman Empire was added and attached to the lordship of Torriglia and the marquisate of Borgo San Stefano, together with the qualification of Hochgeboren. That same year, the Dorias inherited the fiefs and titles of the house of Pamphilj of Gubbio, patricians of Rome and Princes of San Martino and Valmontone. The name then became Doria Pamphilj. They had already incorporated by marriage the wealthy inheritance of the Landi family.

== Palazzo Doria Pamphilj ==
The Palazzo Doria Pamphilj in Rome was built mostly between the 16th and 18th centuries and contains one of the most valuable private collections of paintings in the world, the Doria Pamphilj Gallery. The Villa Doria Pamphilj was, during the siege of 1849, Giuseppe Garibaldi's headquarters, and was expropriated from the family in the 1970s by the city of Rome.

== Last generations ==
Prince Filippo Andrea VI Doria Pamphilj, a staunch anti-Fascist, in 1944 became the first mayor of Rome following its liberation by the Allies (his father had been Senator of the newborn Kingdom of Italy in 1870).

Princess Orietta Doria Pamphili, Officer of the Most Excellent Order of the British Empire (London, 22 April 1922 - Rome, 19 November 2000) (Note: Princess Orietta Doria Pamphili's other titles were 19th Princess of Melfi, Grandee of Spain First Class, 8th Princess of the Holy Roman Empire, 8th Princess of Santo Stefano d'Aveto and Torriglia, Princess of Valditaro, Valmontone and San Martino al Cimino, Roman Princess, 11th Duchess of Avigliano, Duchess of Montelanico, 15th Marchioness of Carrega, Croce in Val Trebbia, Ottone, Grondona, Vargo, Cremonte, Cabella and Fontana (Doria-Pamphili-Landi barony), Marchioness of Montecalvello and Cabella, Countess of Loano, Countess of Talamello, Baroness of Giffoni (Doria-Pamphili-Landi barony) and San Cipriano, Lady of Rovegno, Laccio, Monte Tanano, Bagnaria, Cariseto, Casanova sul Trebbia, Foreseto, Garbagna, Fontanarossa, Montebruno, Gremiasco, San Sebastiano Curone, Val di Curone and Montacuto, Turbigo, Lagopesole, Lacedonia, Forenza, Candela, San Fele, Rocchetta Sant'Antonio, Stellanello and of its Valley with Rossi, Duranti and San Vincenzo, Gorga, Lugnano, Grotte, Santo Stefano, Poggio, Alviano, Roccamassima, Colleferro, Anzio and Nettuno, Lady of Seguno Pozzuolo, Bucchio, Pondo, Pratolina, Spinello in Collina, Mortano Soasia, Vallenzera and Sassetta, Filetta and Castiglione dei Genovesi, Genoese Patrician, Noble of Viterbo) the last of the line, married Royal Navy Commander Frank George Wignall Pogson (Maidenhead, Berkshire, 6 September 1923 - Rome, 2 October 1998) in London on 6 August 1958. Prior to his marriage and in accordance with the express wishes of the late Prince Filippo Andrea VI Doria Pamphilj, he added "Doria Pamphilj" to his last name by deed poll.

After the reforms of the Second Vatican Council in the 1960s, Princess Orietta and her husband, both Catholics, worked to promote better relations between faiths. In 2000, Queen Elizabeth II visited Rome and the Anglican Centre, which is housed in the Palazzo Doria Pamphilj.

== Patrimonial succession ==
The couple adopted two children:

- Jonathan Paul Andrew Pogson Doria Pamphilj (born 1963) - who became Jonathan Doria Pamphilj in 2006 by deed poll - in 2006 formed a civil partnership at the British Embassy in Switzerland with Elson Edeno Braga, a Brazilian citizen, and has two children by surrogacy: Emily Doria Pamphilj (b. 2006) and Filippo Andrea Doria Pamphilj (b. 2007).
- Gesine Margaret Orietta Mary Pogson Doria Pamphilj (born 1964), married Massimiliano Floridi, with whom she has four daughters: Anna Floridi (b. 1994), Elisa Floridi, Orietta Floridi and Irene Floridi (b. 2004).

Upon Princess Orietta Doria Pamphilj's death on November 19, 2000, her estates were inherited by Jonathan Pogson Doria Pamphilj and Gesine Floridi. In 2013 the heirs settled into the "Trust Doria Pamphilj" all of their inherited estates.

The ability of Jonathan Pogson Doria Pamphilj's children to inherit, after his death, was called into question in October 2009 and legal action was taken by his sister on this point. On the basis that Jonathan Pogson Doria Pamphilj's children were born of surrogate mothers, Gesine Floridi claimed that a recently passed Italian law on assisted procreation debarred them from inheriting. In 2010, a court in Rome declined to hear the case.

== See also ==
- Pamphili – with inclusive family tree

== Sources ==
- N. Battilana, "Famiglia Doria" in Genealogia delle Famiglie Nobili di Genova, 1827.
