= Prince of Melfi =

Italian noble title

Coat of arms of the Princes of Melfi

The title of Prince of Melfi is an Italian noble title that was granted to Andrea Doria, a famous admiral, statesman and condottiere from the Republic of Genoa, in 1531, along with the lands of the country of Melfi by Charles V. The title was handed to his grandson Giovanni Andrea Doria upon Andrea's death.

The title continued to be held by Andrea's descendants through the 17th to 20th centuries. The title ceased to exist in 2000 when the last direct descent of the Doria-Pamphilii-Landi family died.

== Notable holders of the title ==
- Andrea Doria was the first Prince of Melfi.
- Giovanni Andrea Doria was a Prince of Melfi through his adoption by Andrea Doria.
- Princess Leopoldina of Savoy was Princess of Melfi through marriage to Giovanni Andrea VI Doria-Pamphilj-Landi.
