= Palazzo Ambrogio Di Negro =

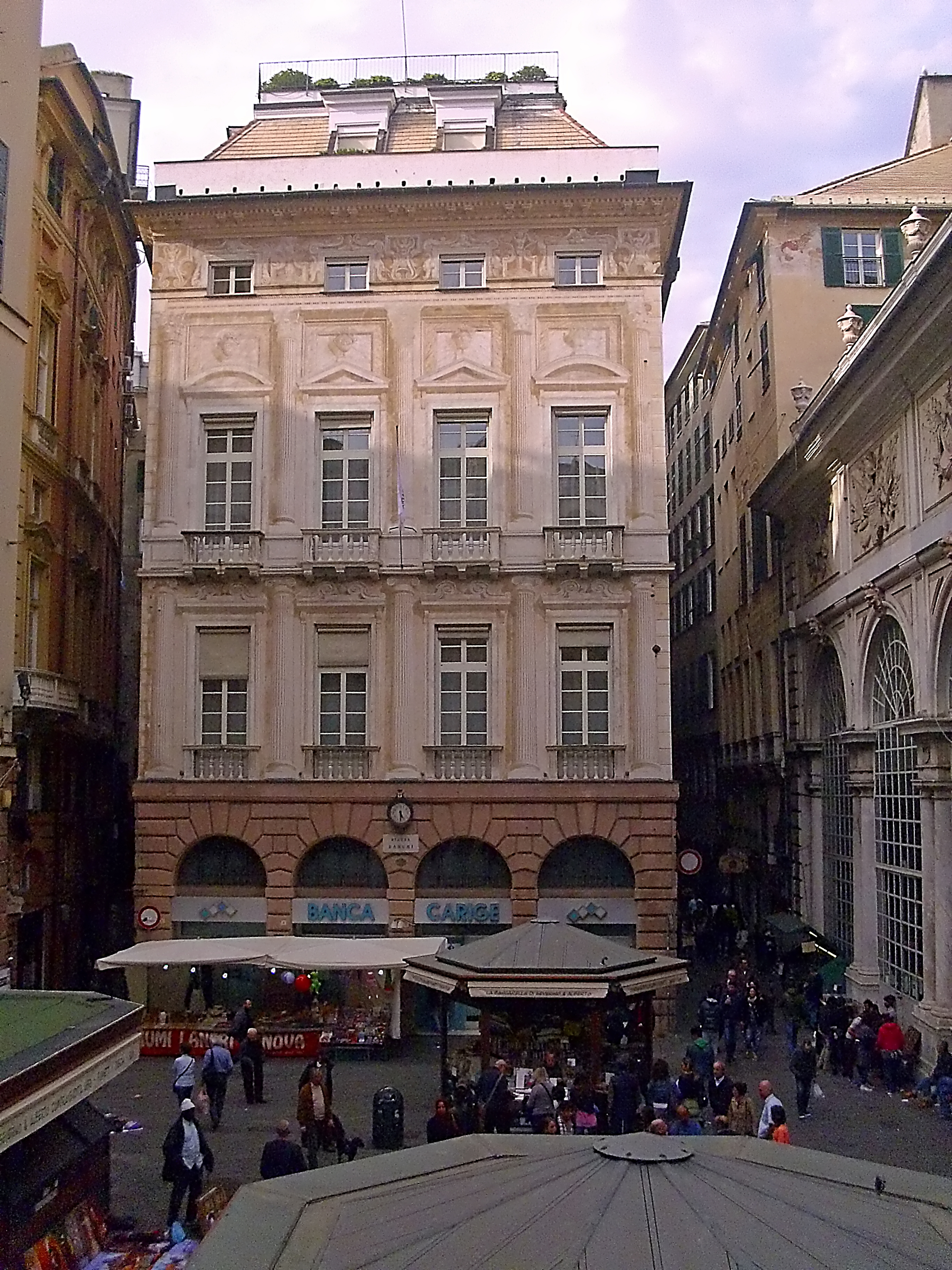
- Glimpse from Via al Ponte Reale
- Interactive map of the Palazzo Ambrogio Di Negro area
- Alternative names: (Palazzo del Sigr Horatio de Negro)

General information
- Status: In use
- Type: Palace
- Architectural style: Mannerist
- Location: Genoa, Italy, 2, Via San Luc
- Coordinates: 44.40946°N 8.92984°E
- Current tenants: housing, offices
- Construction started: 1569
- Completed: 1572

UNESCO World Heritage Site
- Part of: Genoa: Le Strade Nuove and the system of the Palazzi dei Rolli
- Criteria: Cultural: (ii)(iv)
- Reference: 1211
- Inscription: 2006 (30th Session)

The Palazzo Ambrogio Di Negro is a building located in Via San Luca at number 2 in the area of the Mercato di Banchi in the historic centre of Genoa, included on 13 July 2006 in the list of the 42 palaces enrolled in the Rolli di Genova that became World Heritage by UNESCO on that date. It preserves an important Mannerist painting cycle inside. In front of the palace is the Loggia dei Mercanti (Genoa) and the Church of San Pietro in Banchi.

== History ==
Erected between 1569 and 1572 by Ambrogio Di Negro (1519—1601), banker to the Spanish Crown, elected doge of the Republic of Genoa in the two-year period 1585–1587, and cultured exponent of the Accademia degli Addormentati, owner also of the Villa Di Negro in Fassolo, today Rosazza. The palace is included in the 1622 Rubensiana edition of Palazzi di Genova. Present in all the rolli, it reached its maximum splendour at the beginning of the Seventeenth when Orazio, illegitimate son and heir of Ambrogio took over.

The palace remained in the Di Negro family for over two hundred years as the seat of important business activities.

It houses the headquarters of the Edoardo Garrone Foundation.

== Description ==
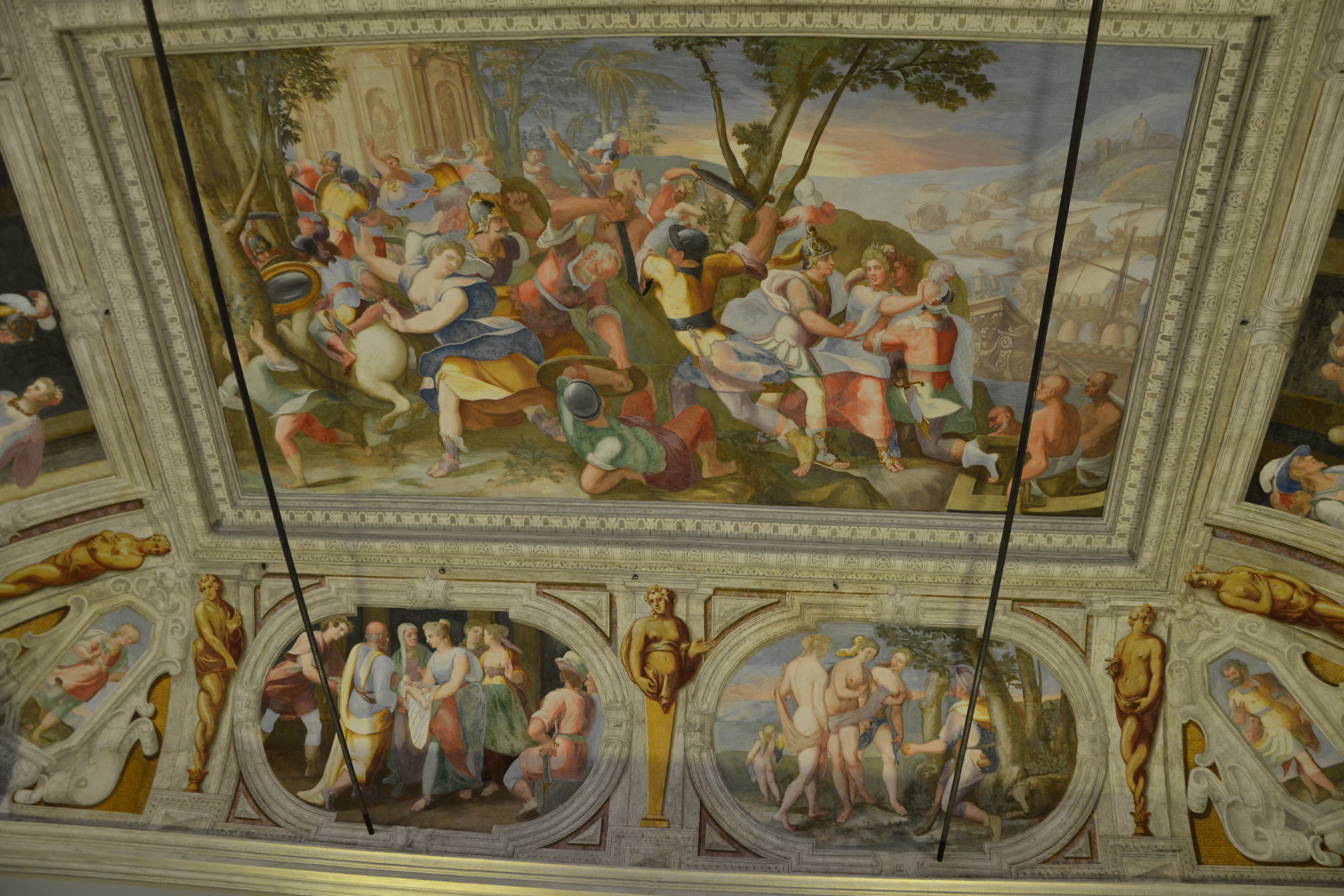
Andrea Semino, fresh

Located next to the Loggia dei Mercanti, it shows two main facades with frescoed squares: on Piazza Banchi, which was reorganised in those years (between 1590 and 1596), and on the carrubeous rectus (today's Via San Luca) where the entrance is.

The vaulted staircase, which rises to the second floor, overlooks the inner courtyard on three sides with a loggia; the portals in white marble and those in black stone of the great hall on the first piano nobile, with Latin sentences reminiscent of Ambrogio Di Negro's humanism, are of note. The main floor hosts an important decorative cycle dating back to the late 16th century, covering the vaults of three rooms, attributed to Andrea Semino and his workshop. The main room hosts the large fresco with «The Rape of Helen», surrounded by panels with episodes from the life of Paris, while the two smaller rooms host the cycles of Danae (with Danae fecodata da Giove) and her son Perseus (with Minerva and the Muses on Helicon). According to recent studies, Andrea's sons, Cesare and Alessandro, and his brother Ottavio.

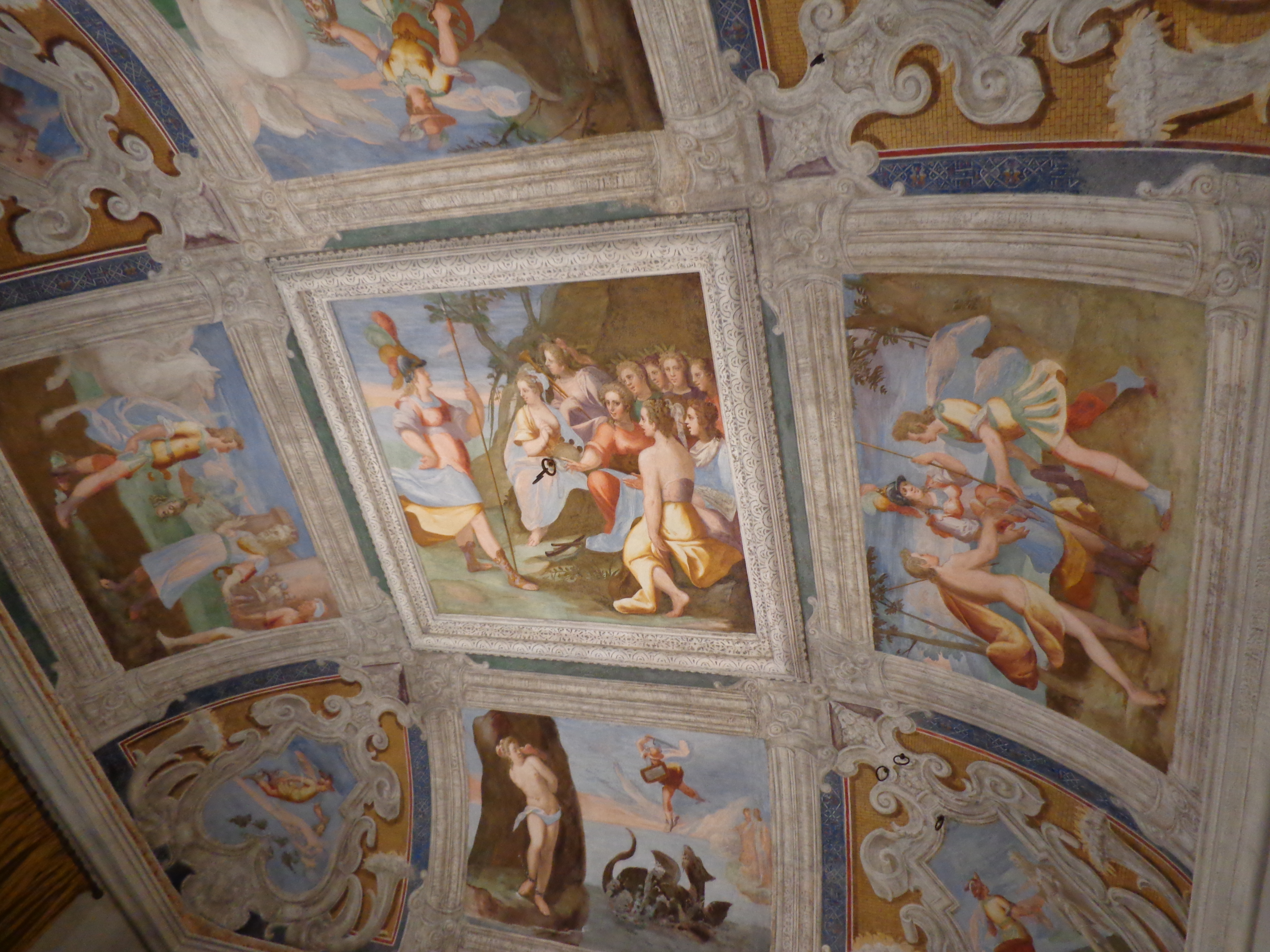
Andrea Semino, frescoes in the Sala di Perseo

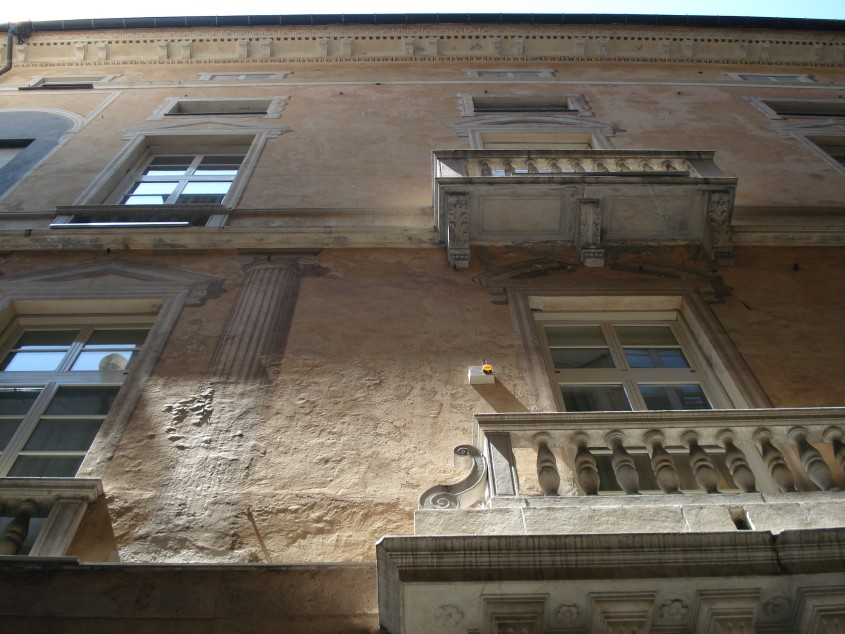
The facade of Palazzo Ambrogio Di Negro on Via San Luca

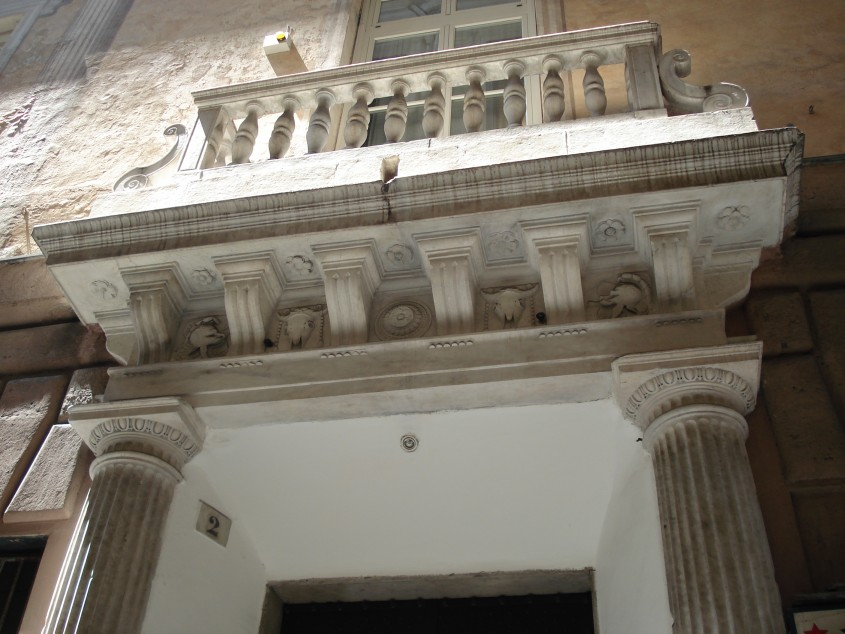
Particular of the portal on Via San Luca

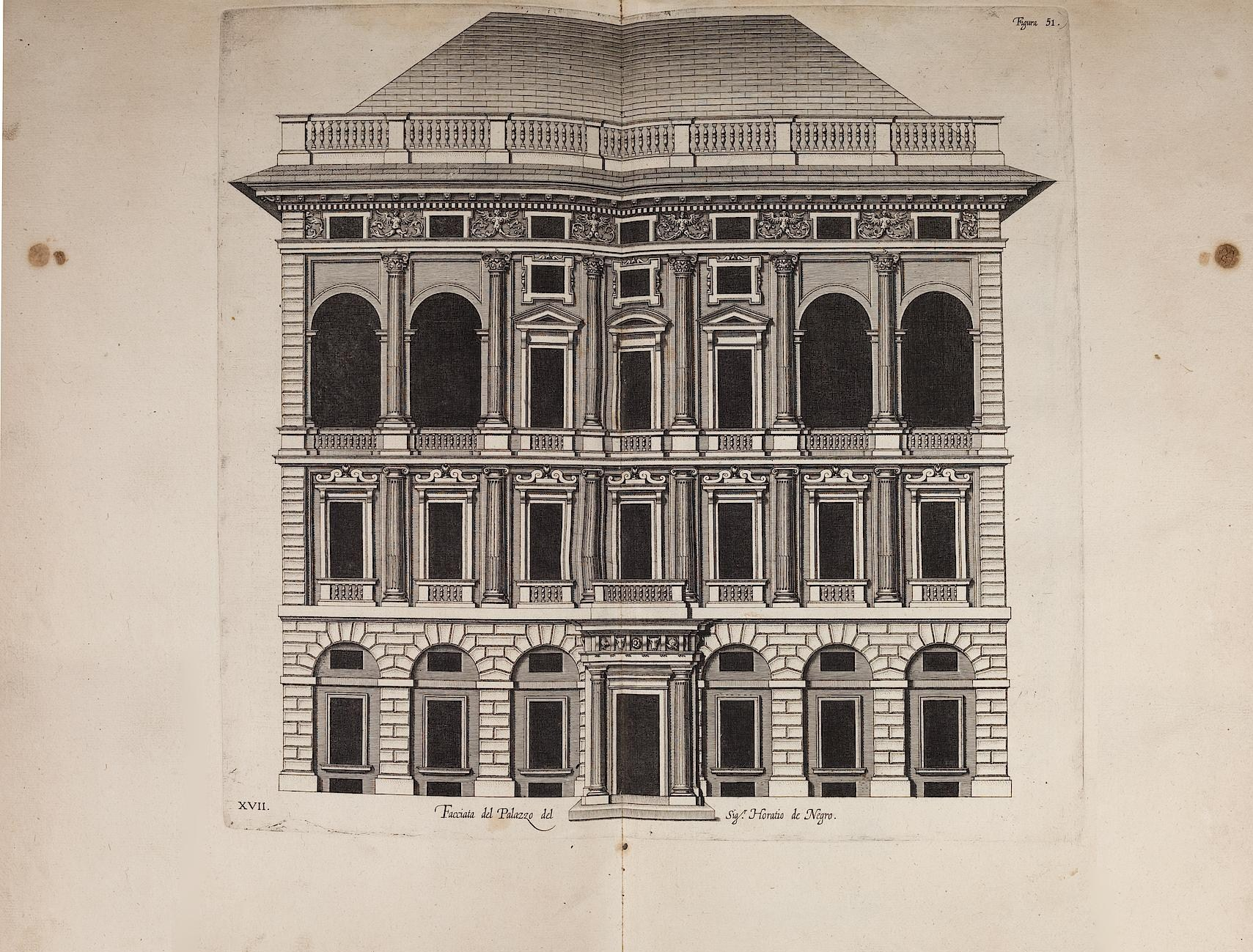
Engraving from Palazzi di Genova by P. P.Rubens, 1622

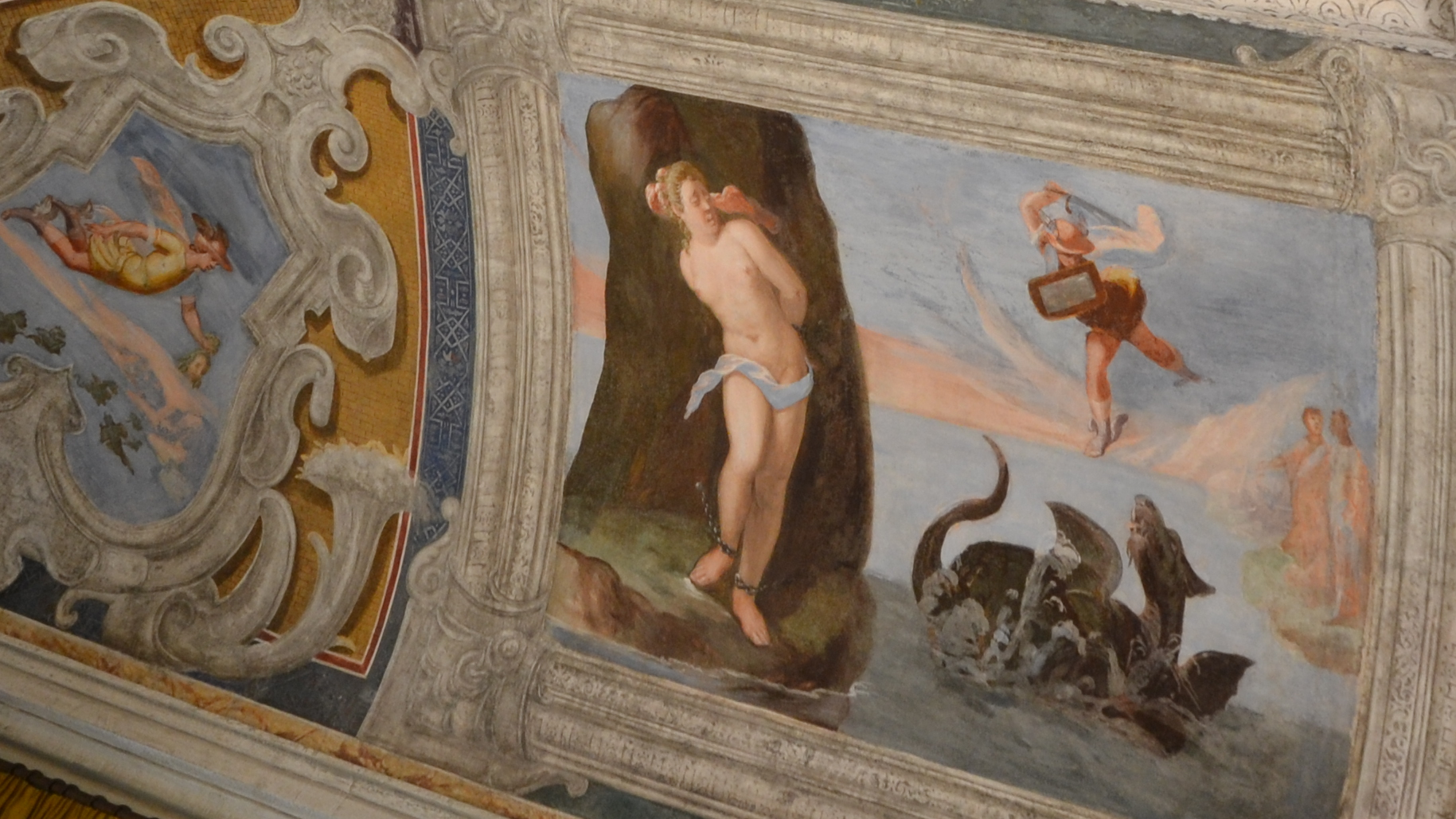
Andrea Semino, "Perseus and Andromeda", late 16th century fresco

== Sources ==
=== Italian sources ===
- E. Poleggi, Genova. Una civiltà di Palazzi, Cinisello Balsamo (Milano) 2002, pp. 100–101 (Palazzo di Ambrogio Di Negro (1569-1572))
- P. P. Rubens, Modern Palaces and Ancient Palaces of Genoa, 1652, published by Jan Van Meurs in Antwerp, fig. 51.
