= Semini =

Semini is an Italian surname. Notable people with the surname include:

- Antonio Semini (c. 1485 – after 1547), Italian painter
- Ottavio Semini (c. 1530–1604), Italian painter

== See also ==
- Seminis (disambiguation)
