= Giacomo Bargone =

Italian painter

Giacomo Bargone (fl.16th century) was an Italian painter of the Baroque period, born and active in Genoa. He trained with Andrea and Ottavio Semini. He excited the jealousy of a contemporary artist, Lazzaro Calvi, who reputedly poisoned him and ransomed his cat for several thousand ducats.
