= Palazzo Campanella o di Baldassarre Lomellini =

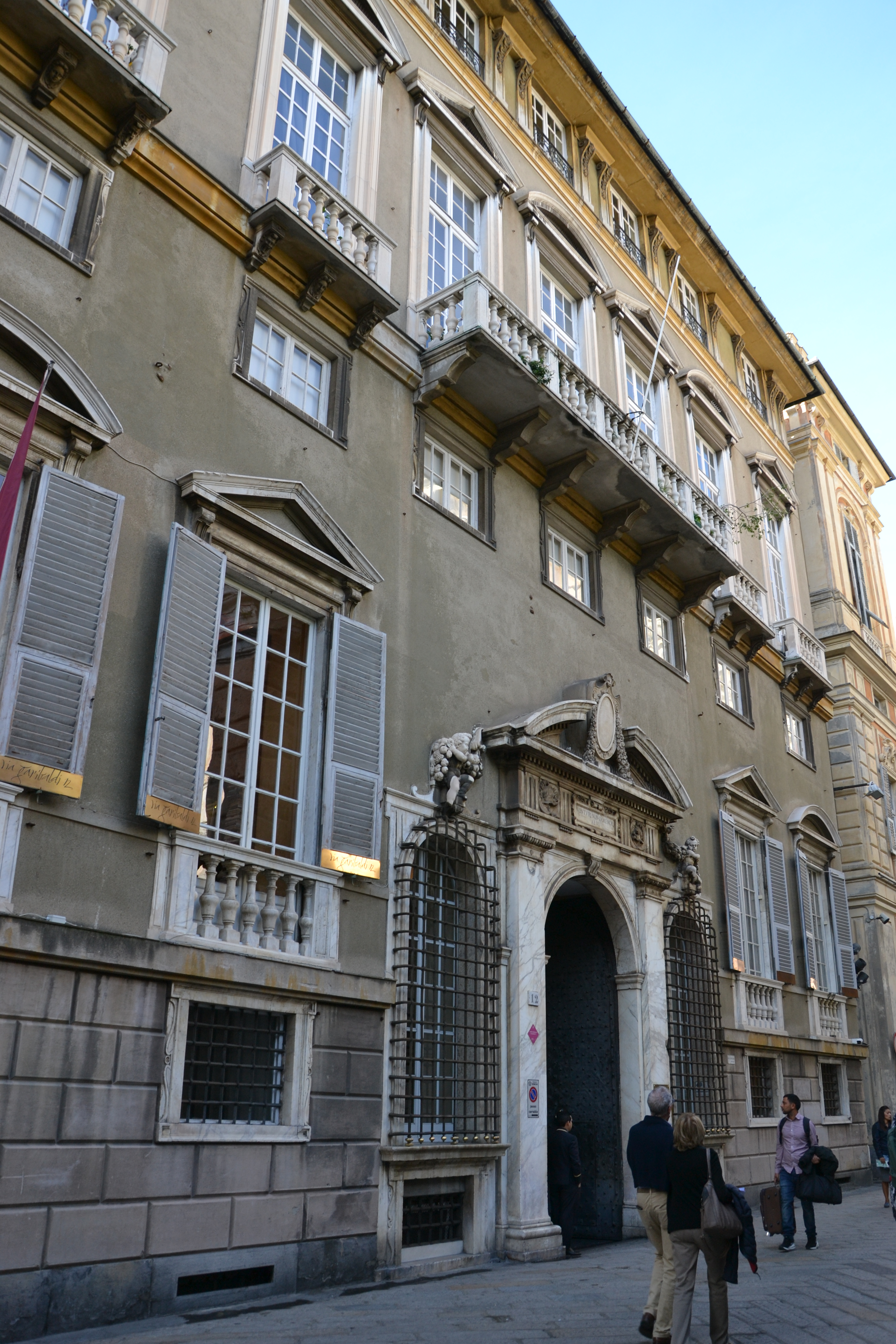
- Facade of the Palazzo Campanella o di Baldassarre Lomellini in via Garibaldi 12
- Interactive map of the Palazzo Campanella o di Baldassarre Lomellini area
- Alternative names: Palazzo Cristoforo Spinola, Palazzo Campanella

General information
- Status: In uso
- Type: Palace
- Architectural style: Mannerist
- Location: Genoa, Italy, 12, Via Garibaldi
- Coordinates: 44.411119°N 8.932597°E
- Current tenants: offices
- Construction started: 1562
- Completed: 1562

Design and construction
- Architects: Giovanni Ponzello; Emanuele Andrea Tagliafichi and Charles De Wailly
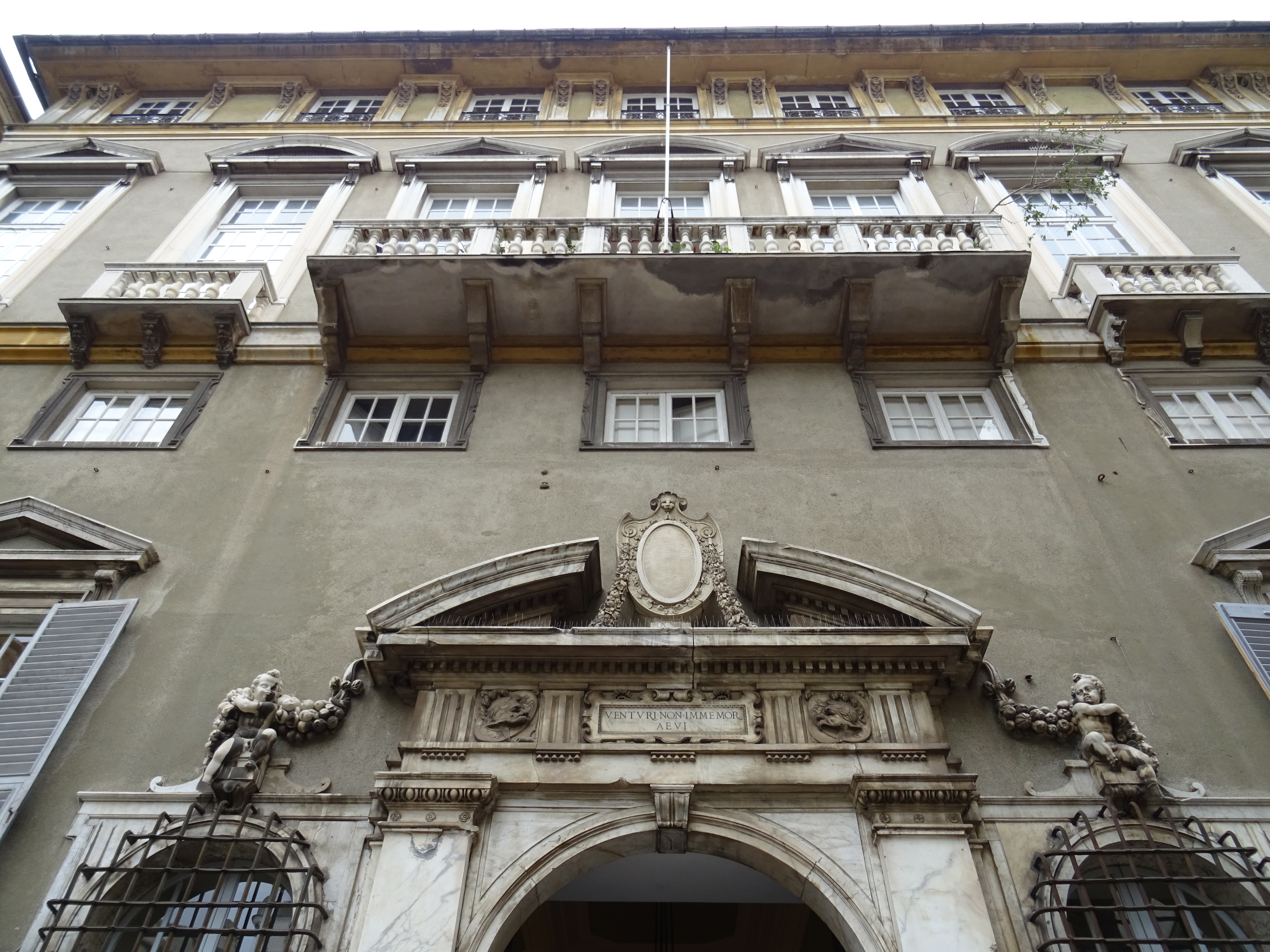

UNESCO World Heritage Site
- Part of: Genoa: Le Strade Nuove and the system of the Palazzi dei Rolli
- Criteria: Cultural: (ii)(iv)
- Reference: 1211
- Inscription: 2006 (30th Session)

The palazzo Baldassarre Lomellini also known as palazzo di Cristoforo Spinola or palazzo Campanella is a building located in via Garibaldi at number 12 in the historical centre of Genoa, included on 13 July 2006 in the list of the 42 palaces inscribed in the Rolli di Genova that became World Heritage by UNESCO on that date.

== History ==
It was built from 1562 for Baldassarre Lomellini, banker to King Philip II of Spain, to a design by Giovanni Ponzello, «chamber architect» of Genoa and designer of Palazzo Tursi, belonging to Niccolò Grimaldi, Baldassarre's son-in-law. Andrea Semino frescoed its halls with Roman stories. Of the original 16th-century façade, only the white marble portal by Taddeo Carlone survives today, bearing the inscription 'venturi non immemor aevi'. Its original appearance can be seen in engravings by Rubens of 1622.

The palace changed hands as early as the end of the 500, first passing into the hands of the Salvago family and then in 1772 into the hands of Marquis Cristoforo Spinola, ambassador of the Republic of Genoa to France, who commissioned the Genoese Emanuele Andrea Tagliafichi, assisted by the famous French architect Charles De Wailly, to renovate it, in order to update its appearance according to the emerging neoclassicism. The intervention, carried out starting in 1773, led to the creation of the sober and rigorous atrium, the porticoed courtyard that replaced the original garden, and the terrace above, adorned with classical-style pavilions. The most famous work, however, was the so-called 'Salone del Sole', a magniloquent masterpiece of architecture and decoration, inspired by the Palace of Versailles on which De Wailly had worked. Its appearance was documented by four engravings by Louis Jean Desprez included in the plates of the entry 'Architecture' of the 'Encyclopédie ou Dictionnaire raisonné des sciences, des arts et des métiers de Denis Diderot et d’Alembert, and became one of the most prestigious destinations of the Grand Tour, mentioned by Stendhal and Flaubert. The salon was gutted by bombing in 1942, and later what remained of the original decorations was removed and never rebuilt.

After a decade of work, which led to the extension of the west wing and a renewed interior decoration in the French taste, Spinola, having moved to France, sold the building to Marquis Domenico Serra. In 1917 it was then purchased by the shipowner Tito Campanella, who established his offices there and lived on the second piano nobile.

== Description ==
Today the first floor is open to the public, where it is possible to admire the so-called Sala degli zecchini with frescoes by Semino depicting Stories of Scipio from Titus Livius (in the vault, Scipio’s Continence, to the south, Burning of the Carthaginian Ships, to the west, Scipio allied with Massinissa sets fire to the camps of the Carthaginians and Siface and Scipio defeats the Carthaginians at the Campi Magni and takes Siface prisoner, to the north, Scipio refuses gifts, finally, to the east, Scipio after the taking of Cartagena honours with crowns Tiberius and Digitius and with the golden one Admiral Caius Lelius and Scipio meets Hannibal before the battle of Zama). On the second floor, a room with frescoes by Giovan Battista Castello il Bergamasco depicting Storie di Enea e Didone survives, and a room of romantic taste painted in the early 19th century by Michele Canzio.

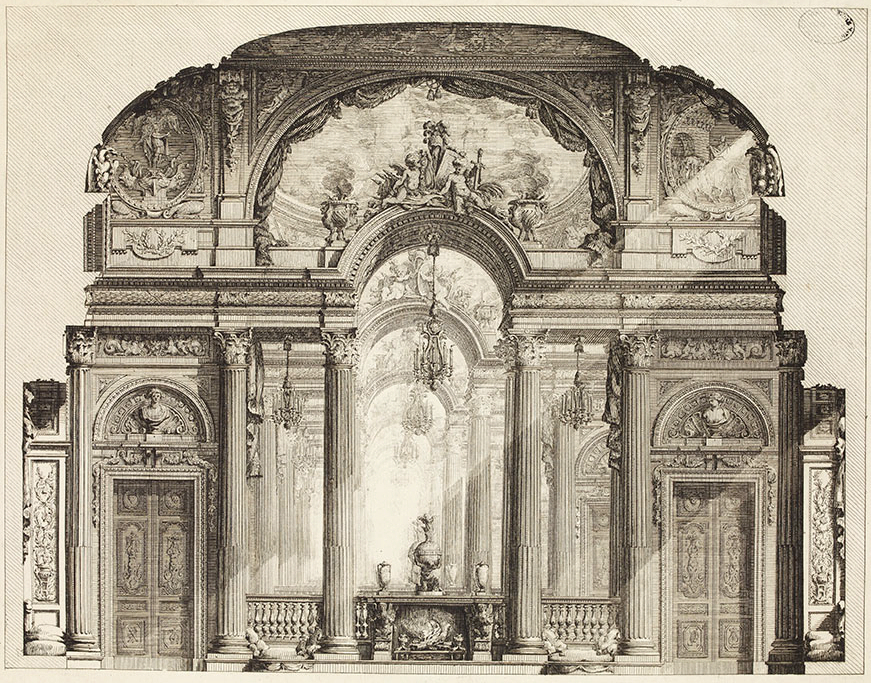
«Salon of the Sun» by Charles De Wailly

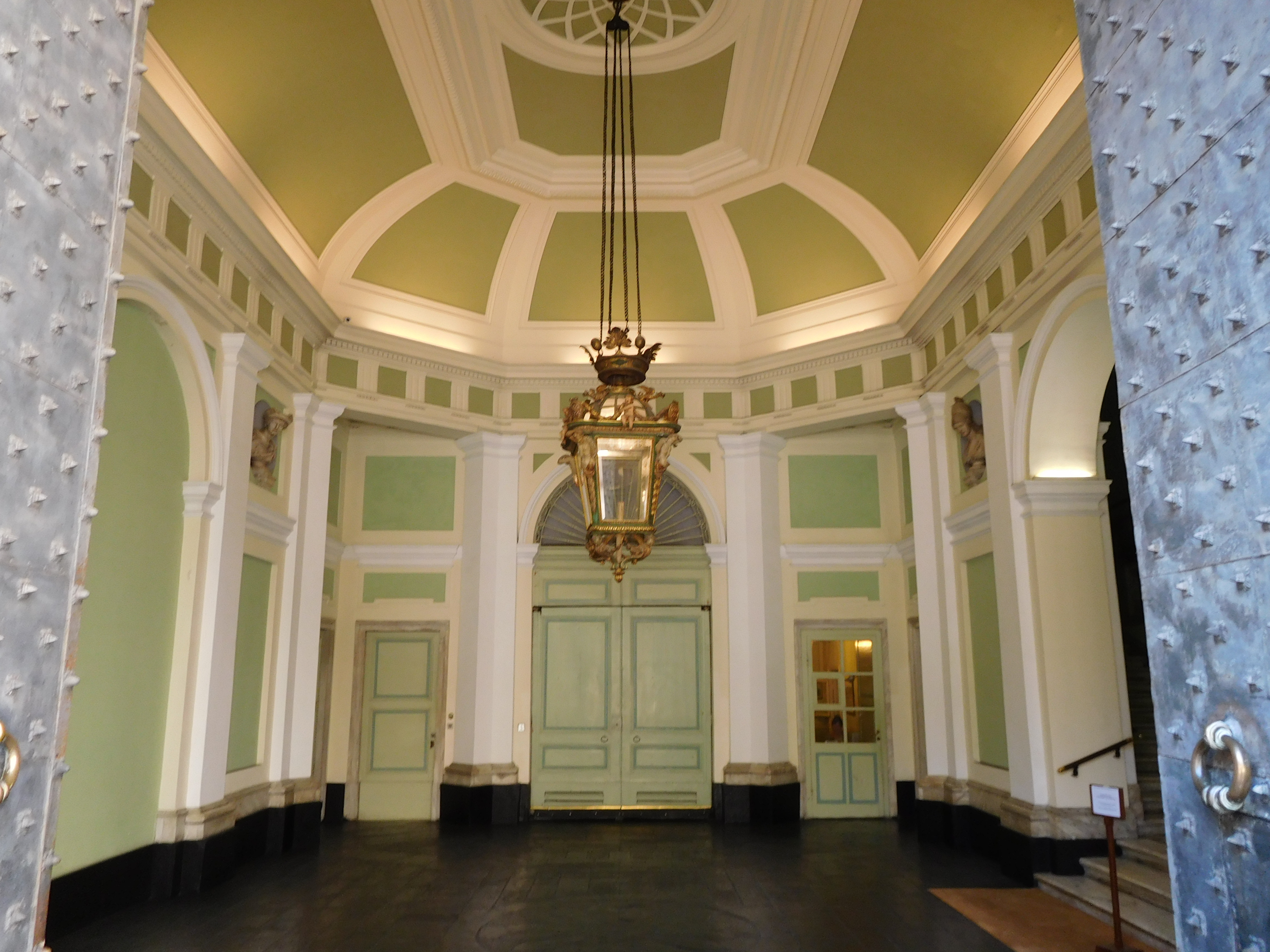
Neoclassical atrium

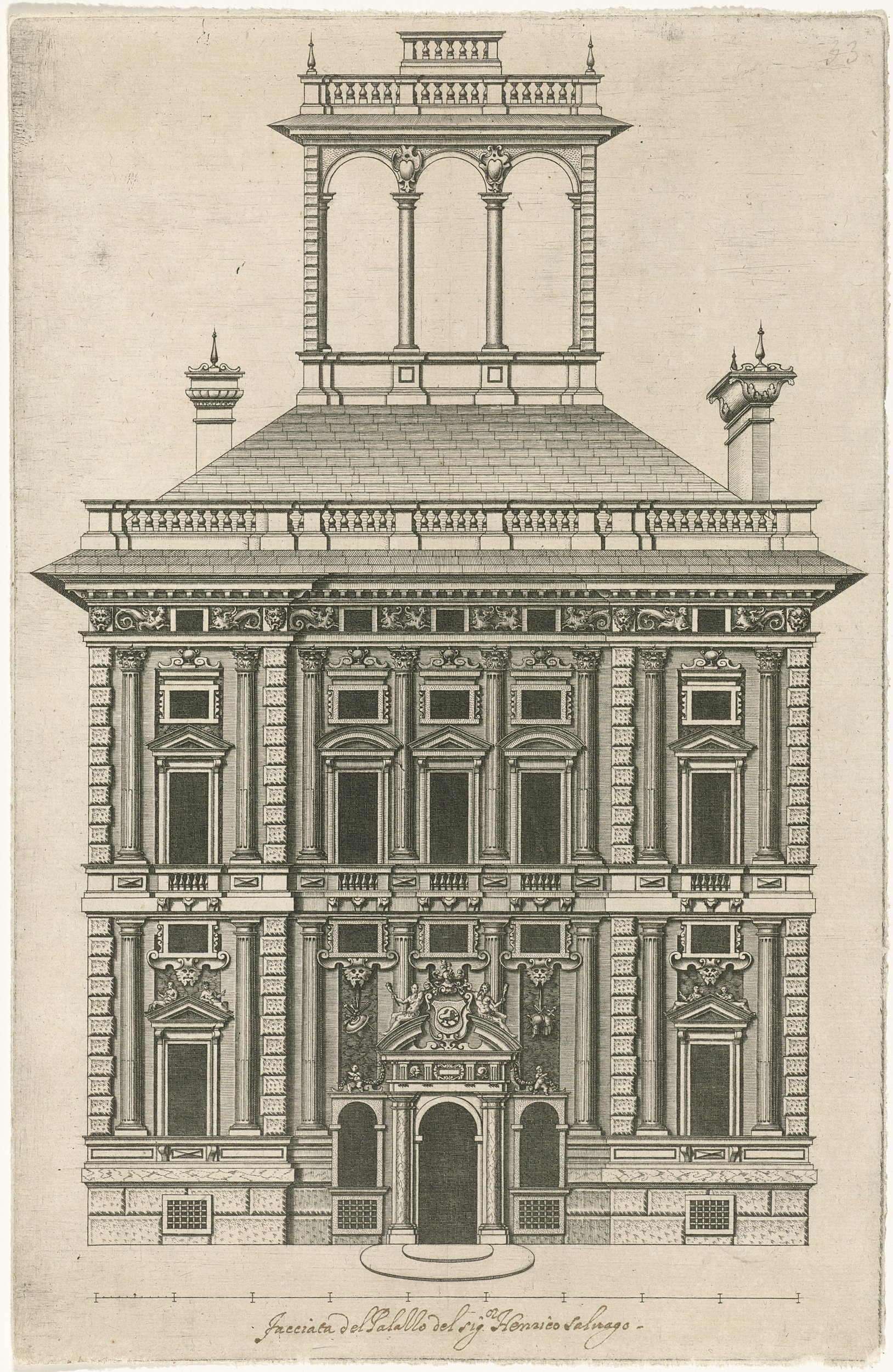
P. P. Rubens, Palazzi di Genova

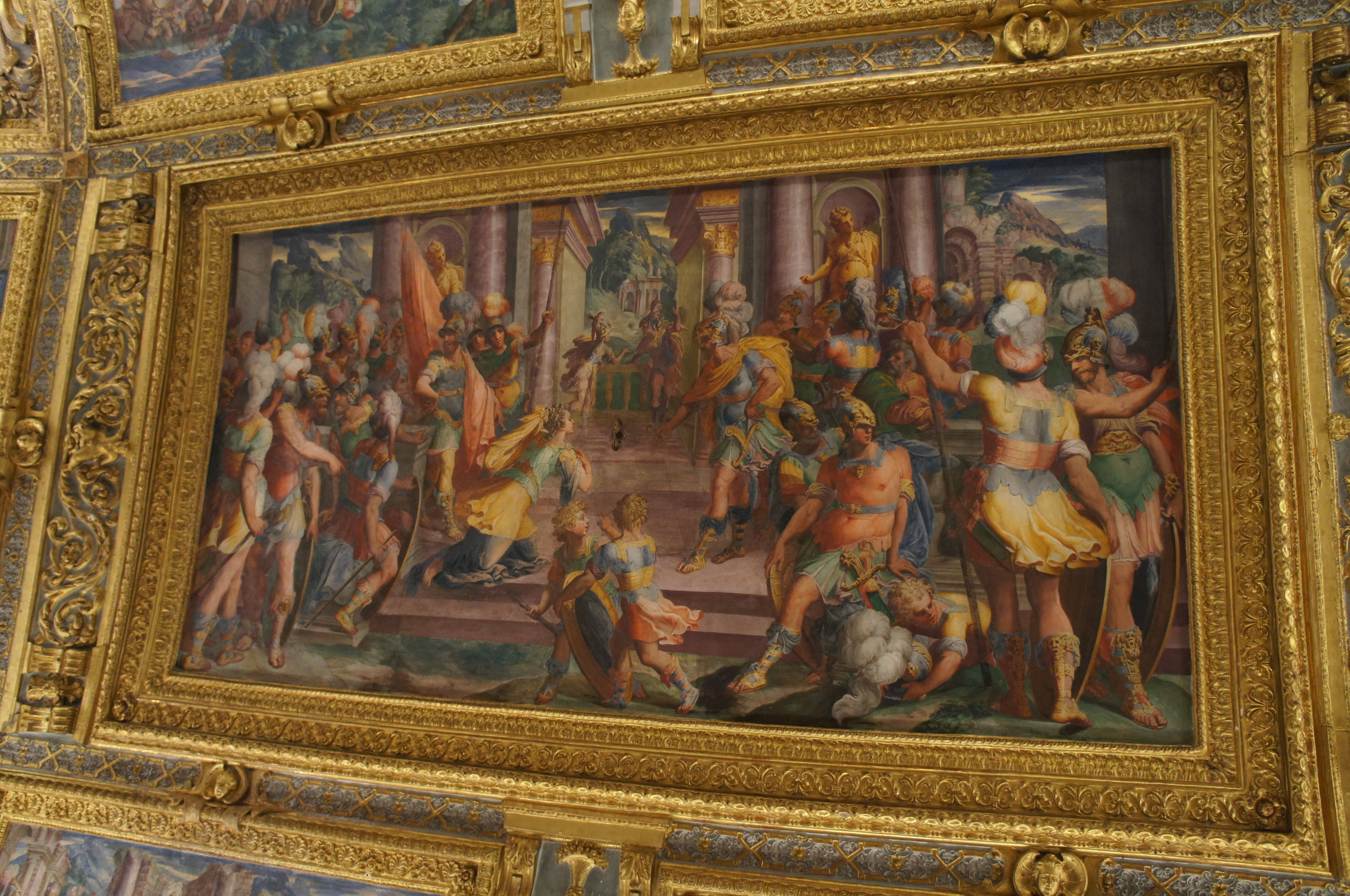
Andrea Semino, Continence of Scipio

== Sources ==
=== Italian sources ===
- E. Poleggi, L’invenzione dei Rolli, catalogo della mostra, Genova 2004.
- M. Spesso, L’architettura a Genova nell’età dell’Illuminismo, Pisa 2007
