= Palazzo Angelo Giovanni Spinola =

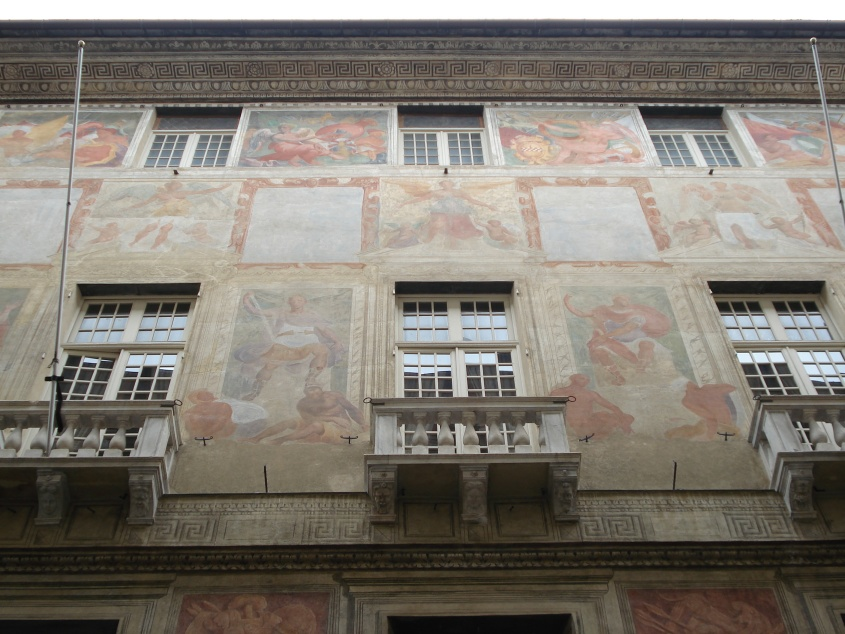
- Facade of Palazzo Angelo Giovanni Spinola
- Interactive map of the Palazzo Angelo Giovanni Spinola area
- Alternative names: Palazzo Doria

General information
- Status: Intact
- Type: Palace
- Architectural style: Mannerist
- Location: Genoa, Italy, 5, Via Garibaldi
- Coordinates: 44°24′39.6″N 8°56′1.3″E
- Current tenants: Deutsche Bank
- Named for: Angelo Giovanni Spinola
- Construction started: 1558
- Completed: 1576
- Renovated: 1580

Design and construction
- Architect: Giovanni Ponzello

UNESCO World Heritage Site
- Part of: Genoa: Le Strade Nuove and the system of the Palazzi dei Rolli
- Criteria: Cultural: (ii)(iv)
- Reference: 1211
- Inscription: 2006 (30th Session)

The Palazzo Angelo Giovanni Spinola is a palace located in Via Garibaldi, in the historical center of Genoa, in Northwestern Italy. It was one of the 163 Palazzi dei Rolli of Genoa, the selected private residences where the notable guests of the Republic of Genoa were hosted during State visits. On 13 luglio del 2006 it was included in the list of 42 palaces which now form the UNESCO World Heritage Site Genoa: Le Strade Nuove and the system of the Palazzi dei Rolli. Now owned by a bank, it is possible to visit the areas open to the public.

== The Rolli of Genoa ==
The Rolli di Genova - or, more precisely, the Rolli degli alloggiamenti pubblici di Genova (Italian for "Lists of the public lodgings of Genoa") were the official lists at the time of the Republic of Genoa of the private palaces and mansions, belonging to the most distinguished Genoese families, which - if chosen through a public lottery - were obliged to host on behalf of the Government the most notable visitors during their State visit to the Republic. Later, these palaces hosted many famous visitors to Genoa during their Grand Tour, a cultural itinerary around Italy

== History ==
The construction of the palace was commissioned in 1558 by Angelo Giovanni Spinola, Ambassador of the Republic of Genoa to Spain and banker in Toledo to Emperor Charles V. The palace was completed in 1576 by his son Giulio, who also ordered in 1580 the excavation of part of the hill behind the palace to expand it with a courtyard and a garden. The building was designed by the architect Giovanni Ponzello. In 1919, the palace was sold to the bank Crédit Commercial de France and was converted into an office building. In 1926, it passed to the Banca d'America e d'Italia and now belongs to Deutsche Bank.

The facade of the palace is decorated with frescoes executed by the Calvi brothers, possibly together with Lazzaro Tavarone. The frescoes depict members of the House of Spinola dressed as Roman condottieri. A staircase decorated by grotesque frescoes leads to the upper floor, decorated with frescoes by Andrea Semino, Bernardo Castello and Lazzaro Tavarone. A fresco attributed to Semino shows the building in its original state, as viewed from a mountain.

== Gallery ==
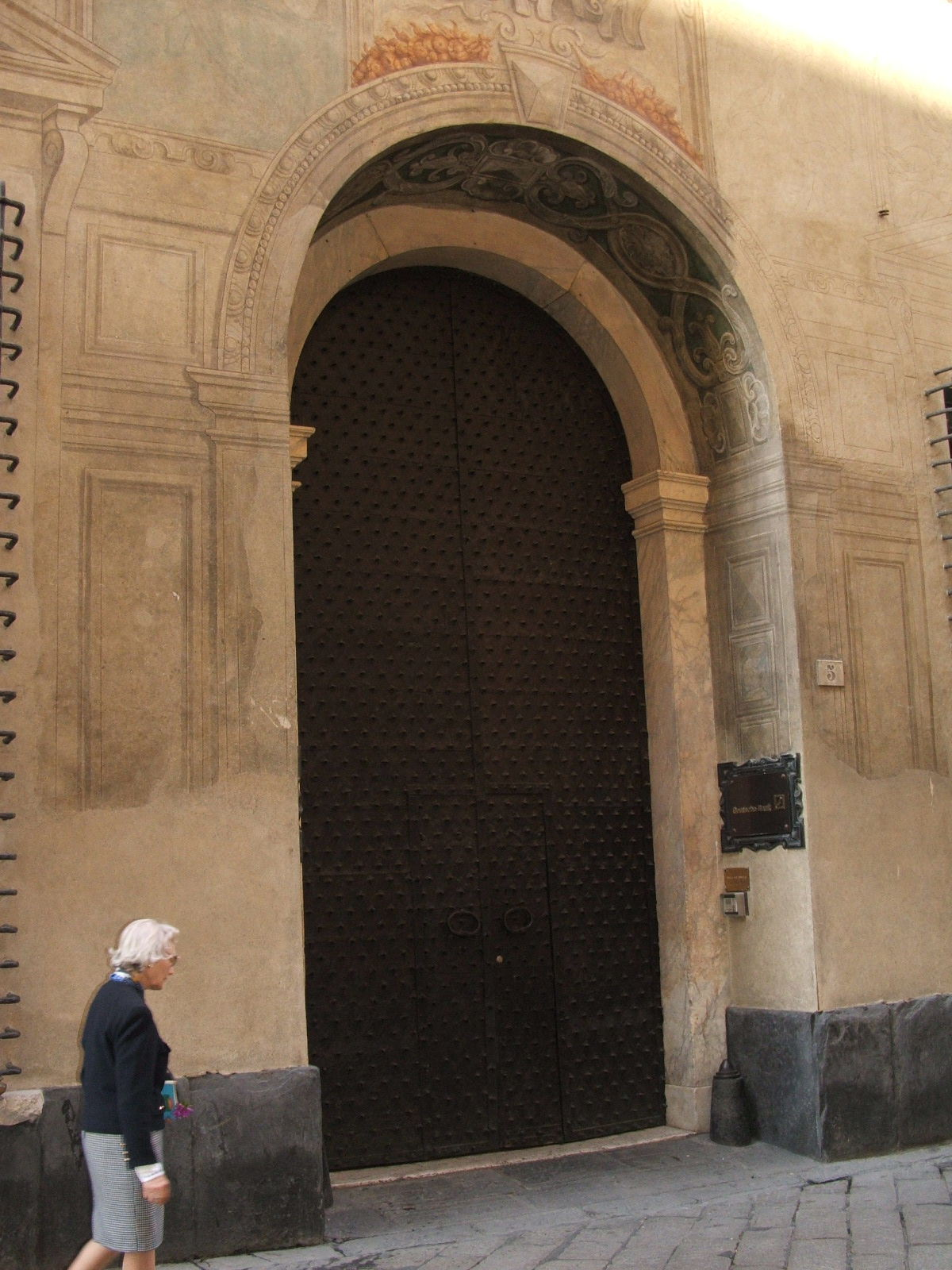
Palazzo Angelo Giovanni Spinola, Main entrance

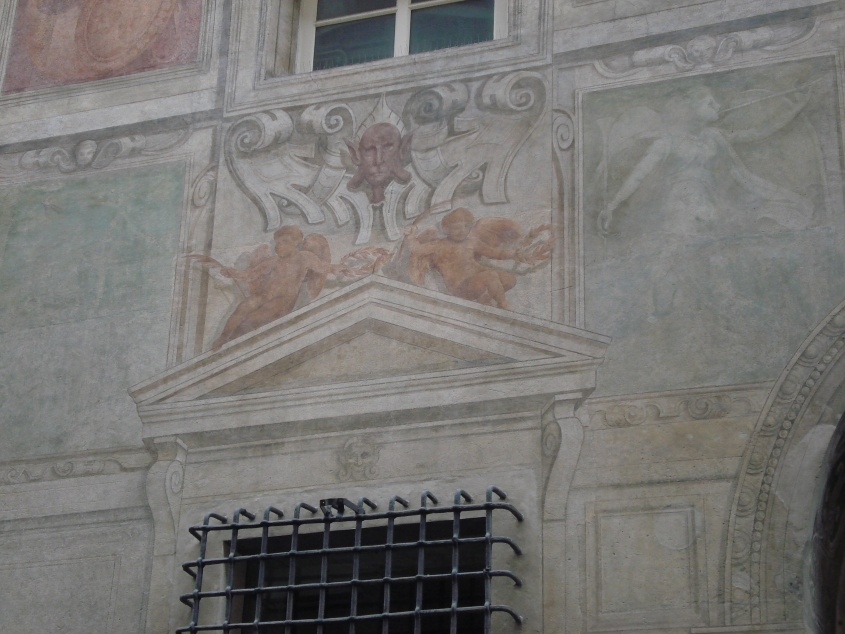
Palazzo Angelo Giovanni Spinola, frescoes on the facade

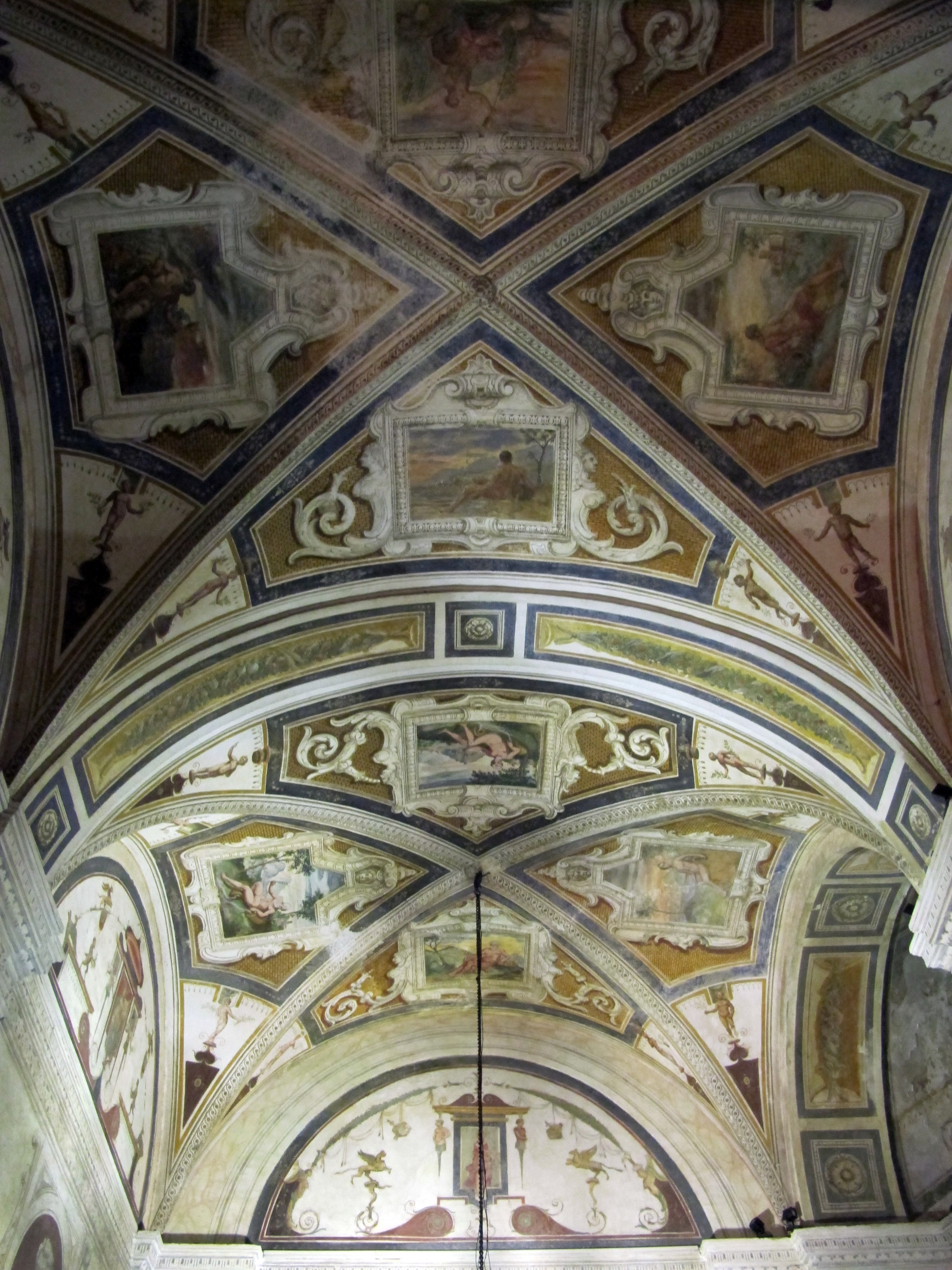
Palazzo Angelo Giovanni Spinola, frescoes of the atrium

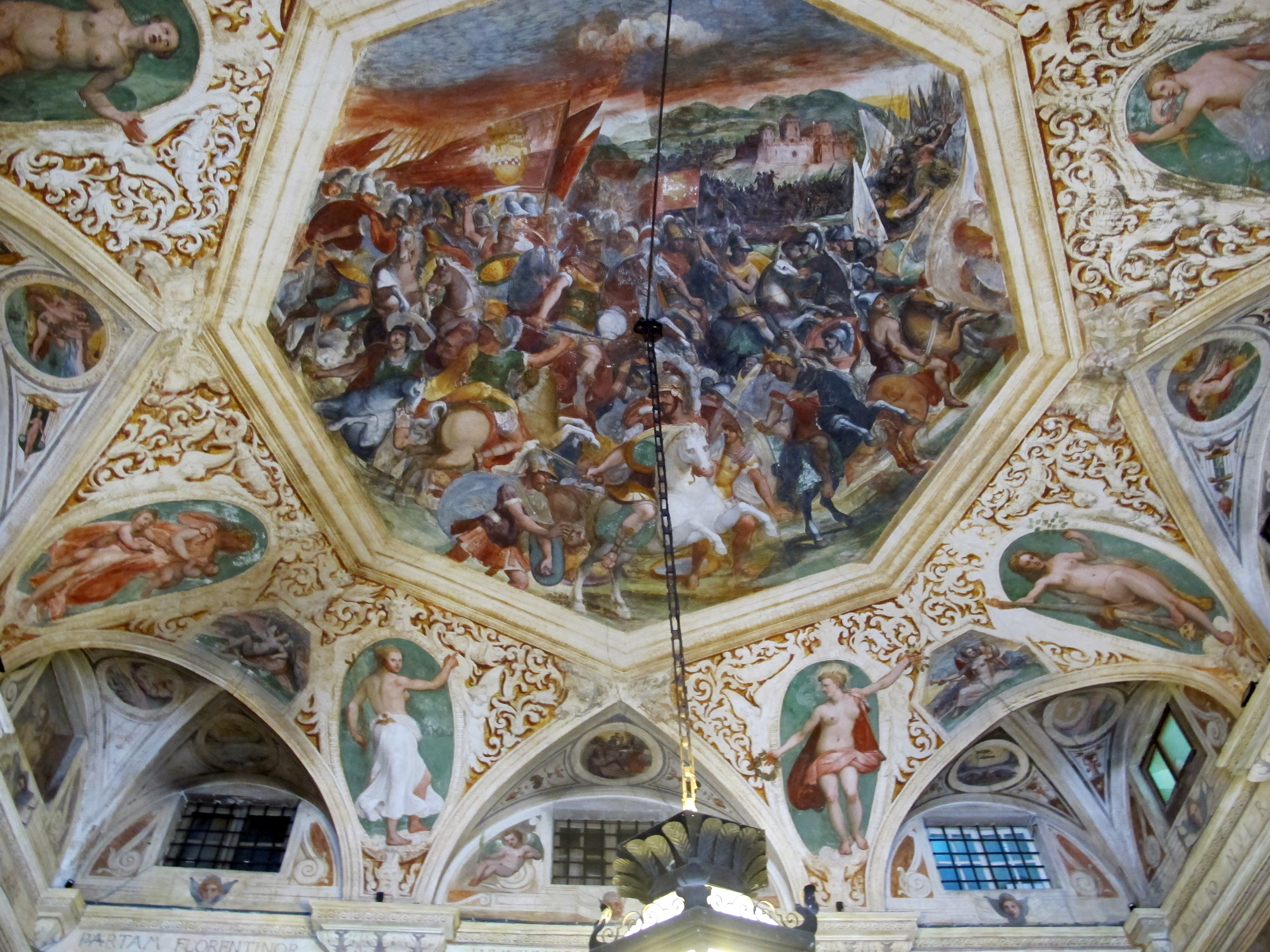
Palazzo Angelo Giovanni Spinola, frescoes of the atrium

== Bibliography ==
- Gioconda Pomella (2007), Guida Completa ai Palazzi dei Rolli Genova, Genova, De Ferrari Editore(ISBN 9788871728155)
- Mauro Quercioli (2008), I Palazzi dei Rolli di Genova, Roma, Libreria dello Stato (ISBN 9788824011433)
- Fiorella Caraceni Poleggi (2001), Palazzi Antichi e Moderni di Genova raccolti e disegnati da Pietro Paolo Rubens (1652), Genova, Tormena Editore (ISBN 9788884801302)
- Mario Labò (2003), I palazzi di Genova di P.P. Rubens, Genova, Nuova Editrice Genovese
