= Teramo (disambiguation) =

Teramo may refer to:

Places:

- Teramo, a city in central Italy

Names:

- Teramo Piaggio, Italian painter of the late-Renaissance
- Jacobus de Teramo (1349-1417), medieval canon lawyer and bishop
- Zacara da Teramo (1350 to 1360 – 1416), medieval composer, singer and papal secretary

Sports:

- Teramo Basket, an Italian basketball club
- Teramo Calcio, an Italian football club

Other:

- Teramo, a sports car in Driver: Parallel Lines.
