= Lazzaro Calvi =

Italian painter

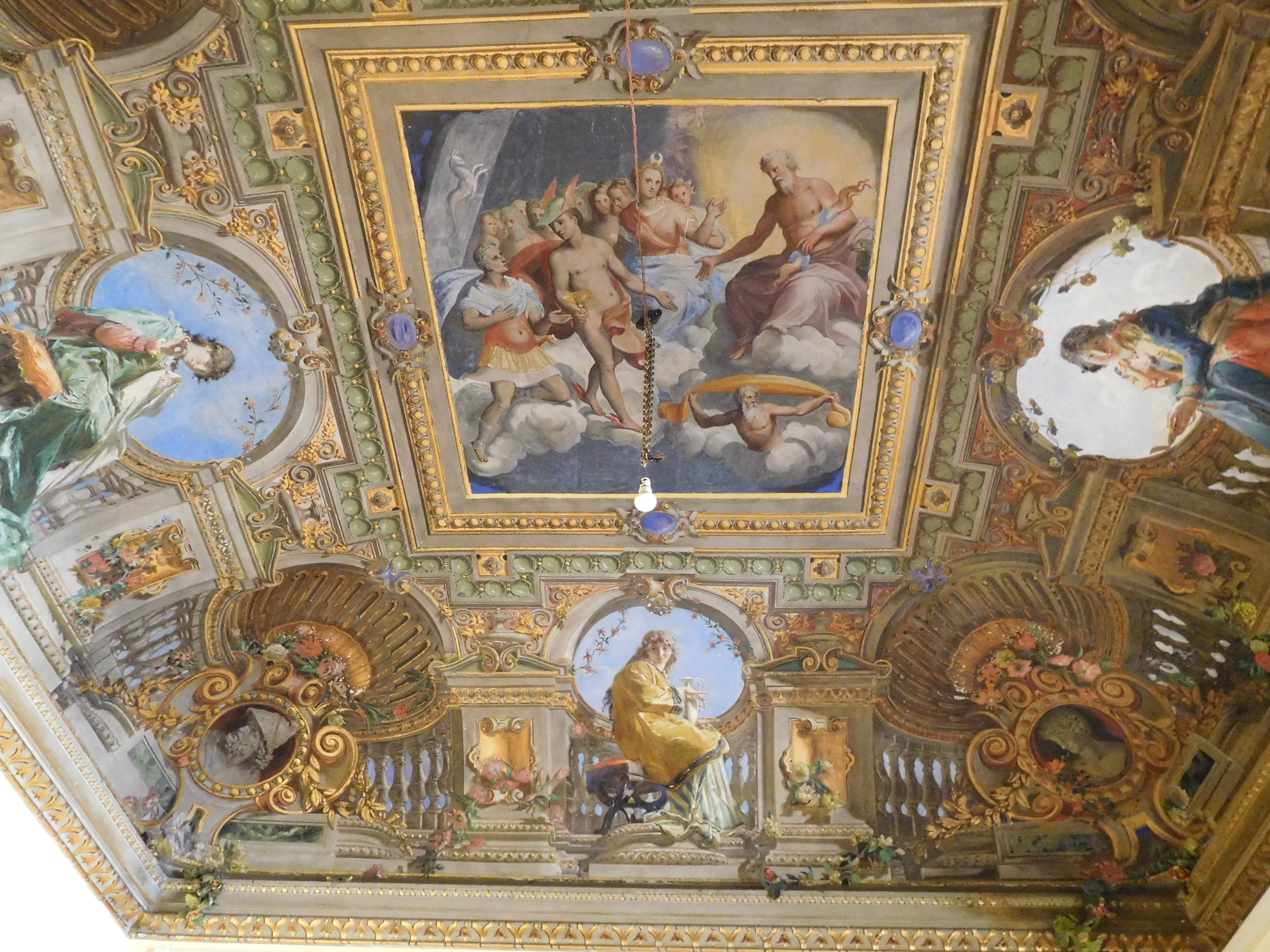

Lazzaro Calvi (1512–1587) was an Italian painter of the late-Renaissance period. He was born in Genoa and trained with his father Agostino Calvi and Perin del Vaga. Older sources claim he lived till the improbable age of 105 years

== Biography ==
His elder brother Pantaleone (died 1595) was also a painter. They worked together at Genoa and the different cities of the republic, as well as at Monaco and Naples. Pantaleono acting as the decorator for Luzzato's works. They painted a façade of the Palazzo Doria (now Palazzo Spinola). They painted a Continence of Scipio for a palace in Genoa. Lazzaro, irritated by the success of some of his contemporaries, prompted him to the commission the poisoning of Giacomo Bargone; and he hired persons to vilify the works of the ablest painters of the time, and to extol his own. While engaged in these schemes, he was engaged to paint the Birth and Life of St. John the Baptist, together with Andrea Semini and Luca Cambiaso, for the chapel of the Nobili Centurioni. Lazzaro was so mortified at this challenge, that he became a mariner, and withdrew himself from painting for twenty years. He returned, however, to his profession, which he continued till he was in his 85th year. His last works were for the church of Santa Cattaprina.

Pantaleone's sons: Aurelio, Marcantonio, Benedetto, and Felice; also became painters. Of these, Marcantonio Calvi was the most distinguished painting with his brothers decorations in palazzo Doria, and by himself in Pegli, San Pietro d'Ancona, and other palaces of Liguria, including the loggia degli Spinola. He then moved to Venice. The brothers painted in the Convent of Gesu e Maria in Genoa, and in the church of Santa Caterina.
