= Giovanni Ponzello =

Italian mannerist architect (1520–1598)

- Born: 1520; Caravonica
- Died: 1598 (aged 77–78); Genoa
- Known for: Mannerist architect

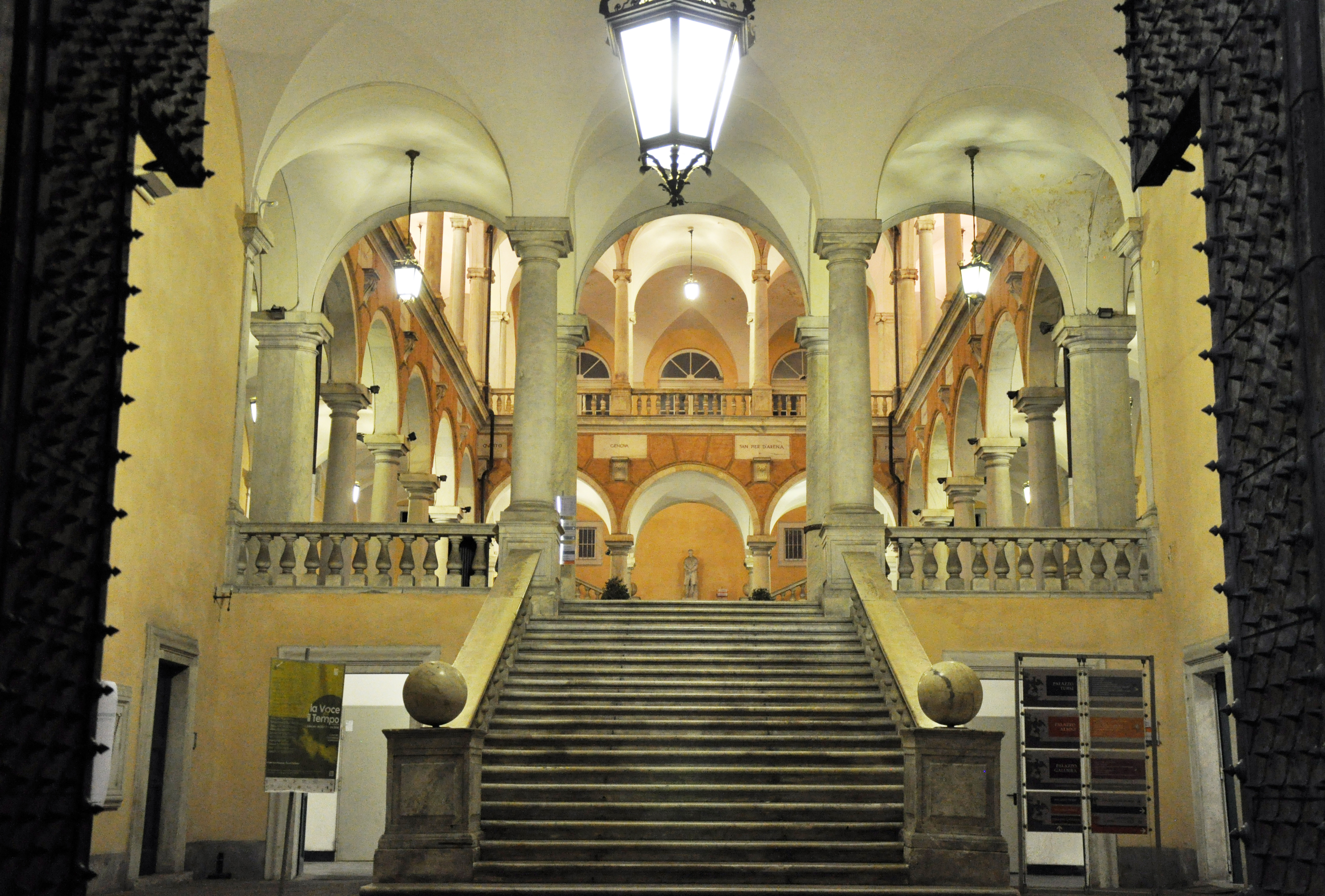
Palazzo Doria Tursi, staircase

Giovanni Ponzello (or Ponsello) (Caravonica, 1520 – Genoa, 1598) was an Italian mannerist architect active in the Republic of Genoa, where he supervised the construction of several distinguished palaces and churches during the Renaissance period.

Several of his works are included in the UNESCO World Heritage Site Genoa: Le Strade Nuove and the system of the Palazzi dei Rolli.

== Works ==
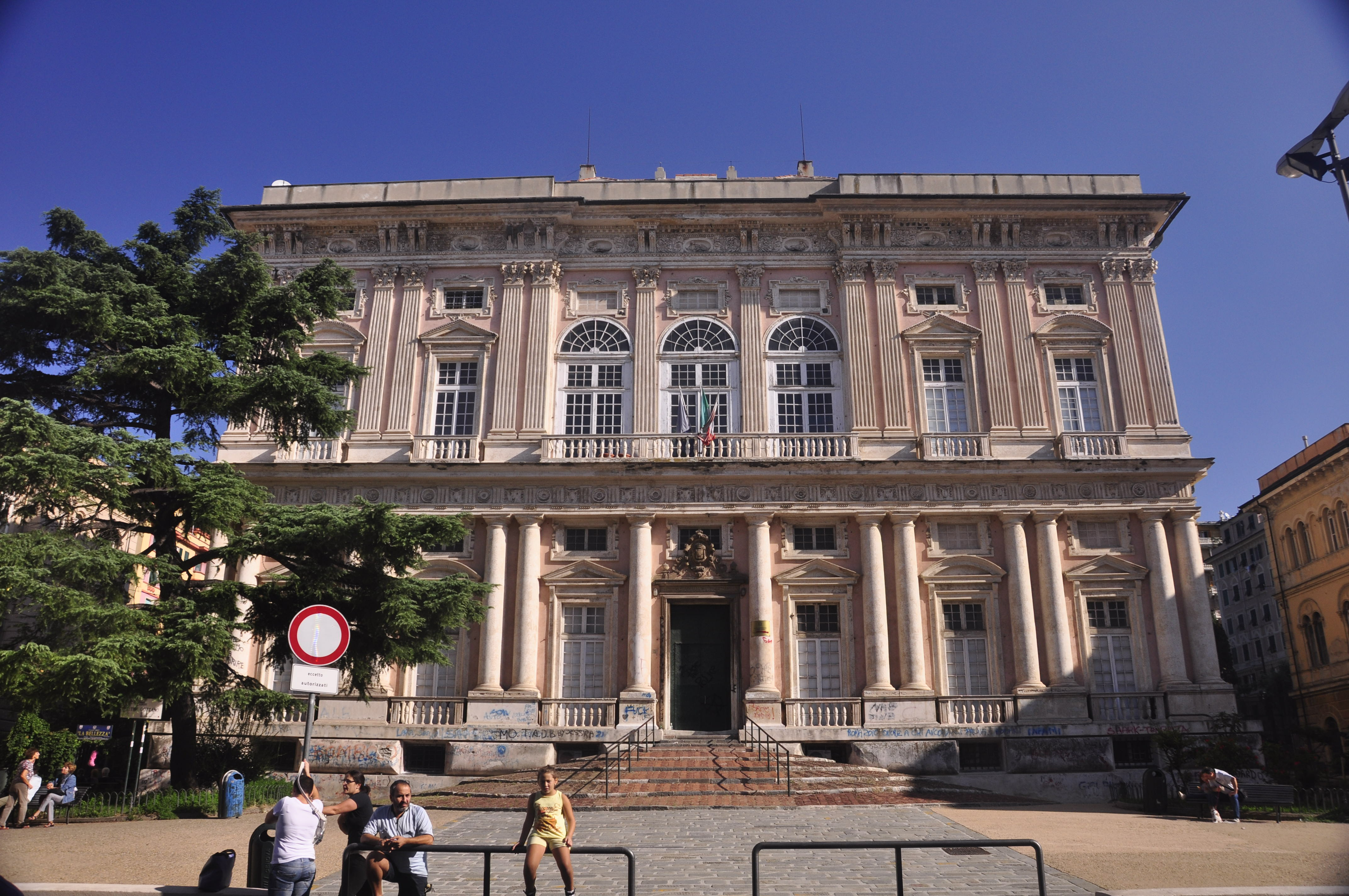
Genoa, Villa Imperiale Scassi, main facade

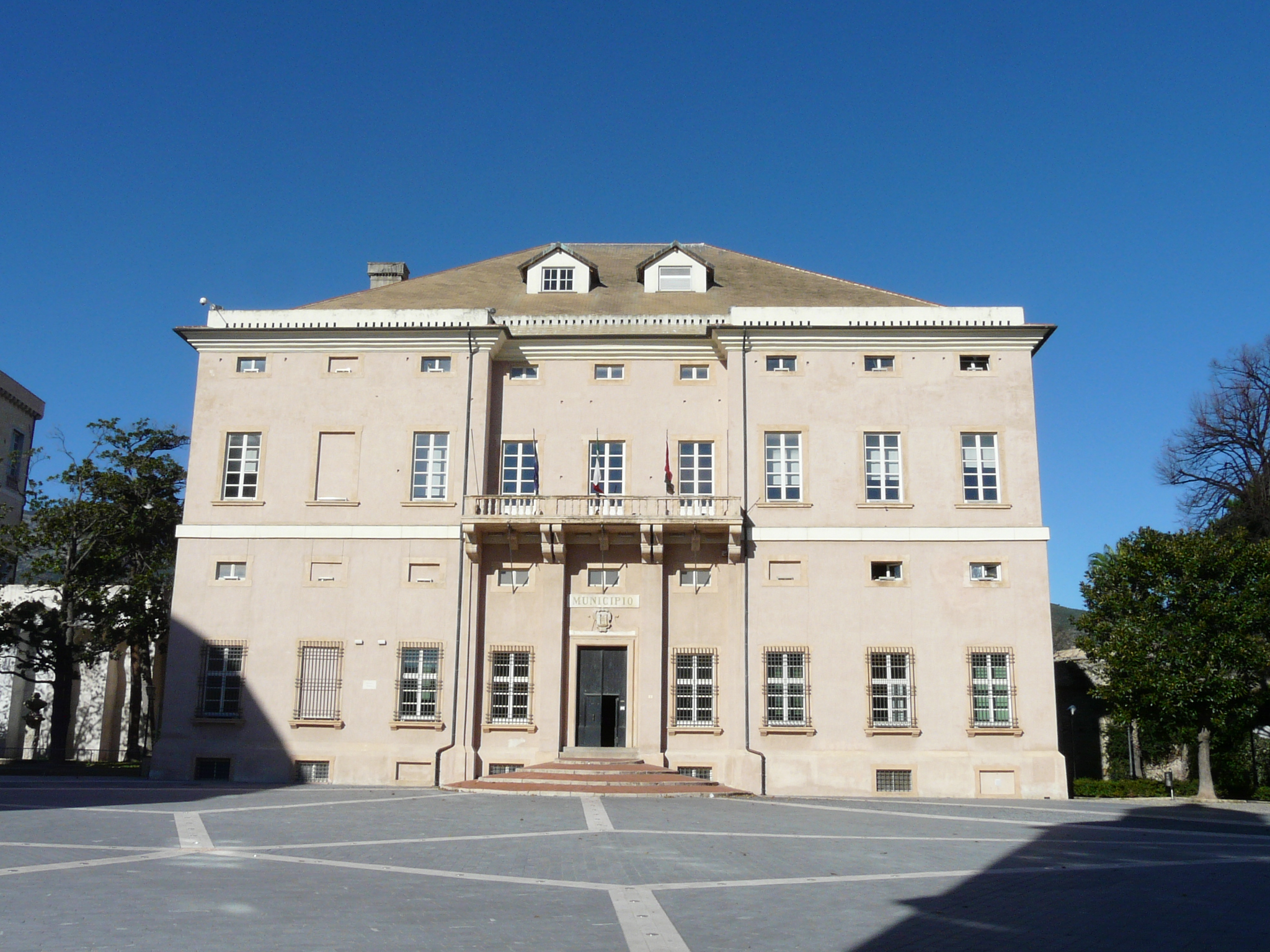
Loano, Palazzo Doria

- 1558, Genoa, historical center: Palazzo Angelo Giovanni Spinola, UNESCO World Heritage Site.
- 1560-1563, Genoa Sampierdarena: Villa Imperiale Scassi "La Bellezza", designed together with his brother Domenico. Inspired by the style of Galeazzo Alessi.
- 1562, Camogli: Torre Doria near the Abbey of San Fruttuoso di Capodimonte.
- 1562-1566, Genoa, Via Garibaldi: Palazzo Baldassarre Lomellini, UNESCO World Heritage Site.
- 1565, Genoa, Via Garibaldi: original facade of the former Palace of Luca Grimaldi (later redeveloped into Palazzo Bianco), in cooperation with his brother Domenico.
- 1565-1579, Genoa, Via Garibaldi: Palazzo Doria-Tursi, now the seat of the Municipality of Genoa, designed together with his brother Domenico. UNESCO World Heritage Site.
- 1567, Genoa Sampierdarena: completed the construction of Villa Grimaldi "La Fortezza", after the death of the architect Bernardo Spazio in 1564. Inspired by the style of Galeazzo Alessi.
- 1574-1578, Loano: Palazzo Doria, now seat of the Municipality of Loano
- 1577, Genoa, Fassolo: Expansion of the Villa del Principe with the construction of the sea loggias and the landscaping of the gardens
- 1581, Genoa, historical center: planned the expansion, never realized, of the Church of Saint Mary Magdalene.
- 1583, Genoa, historical center: Palazzetto criminale, the tribunal and prison of the Republic of Genoa, build in cooperation with Daniele Casella and Giovanni Orsolino.
- 1585, Genoa, historical center: planned the Church of San Pietro in Banchi, in cooperation with Andrea Ceresola, known as "Vannone".
- 1588-1589, Loano: Church of Our Lady of Mercy (known as "Chiesa di Sant'Agostino e Santa Rita") and Convent of Saint'Augustine, now used as offices for the Bishopric of Albenga-Imperia
- 1589, Genoa, historical center: Loggia di Banchi, in cooperation with Andrea Ceresola, known as "Vannone"
- 1593, Genoa, Fassolo: remodeling of the Church San Benedetto al Porto, the chapel of the Villa del Principe

== See also ==
- Genoa
- Genoa: Le Strade Nuove and the system of the Palazzi dei Rolli
- Republic of Genoa
- Doria (family)
- Mannerism

== Bibliography ==
- F. Alizeri, Notizie dei professori del disegno in Liguria dalla fondazione dell'Accademia, vol. 3, Genova, 1864
- E. Poleggi, Strada Nuova: Una lottizzazione del Cinquecento a Genova, Sagep, Genova, 1972
- Guida d'Italia, Liguria, Touring Club Italiano, 2009.

== Other projects ==
- Wikimedia Commons has images or other files about Giovanni Ponzello
