= Teramo Piaggio =

Italian painter (1485-1554)

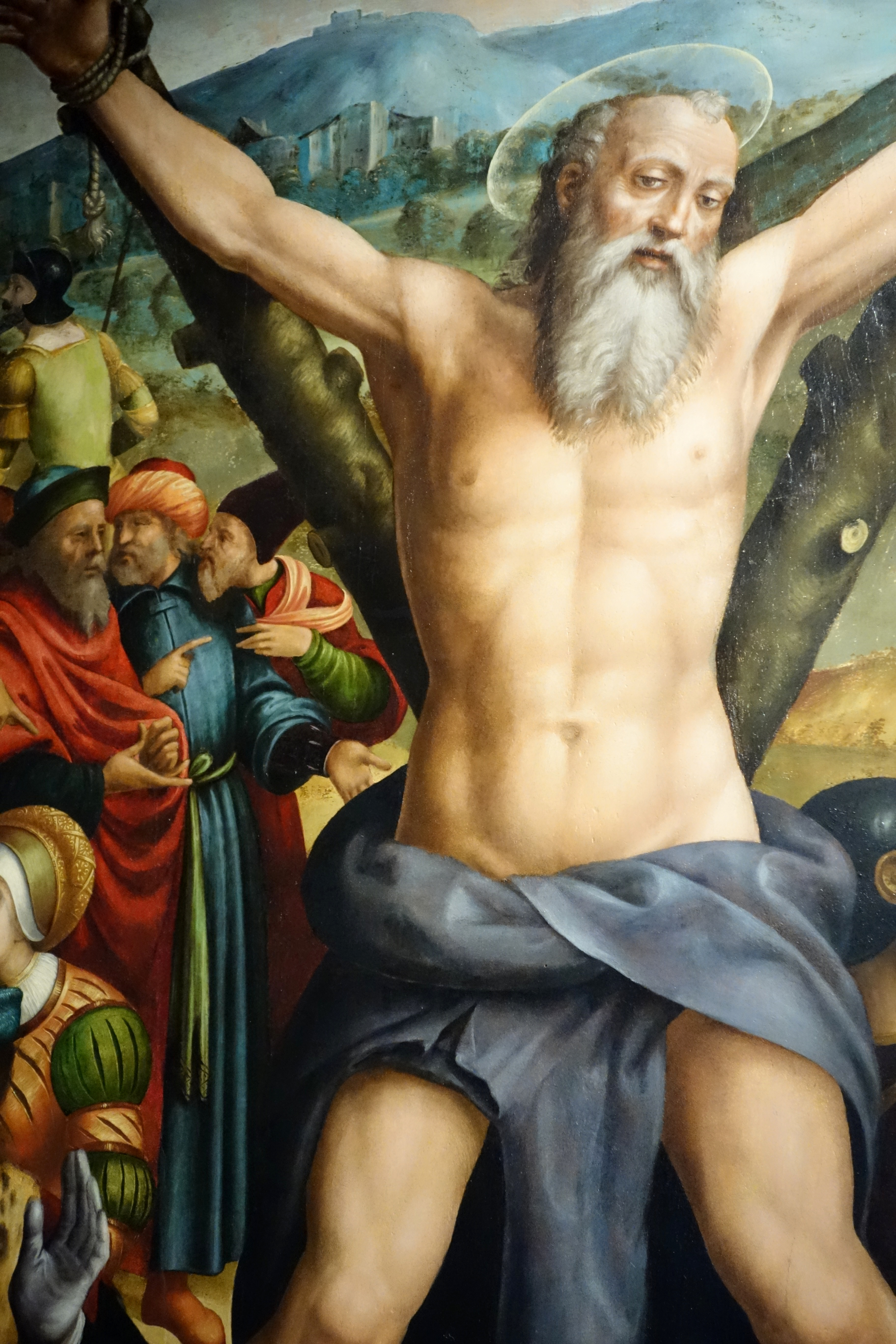
Martyrdom of Saint Andrew (detail) by Antonio Semini and Teramo Piaggio, 1532

Teramo Piaggio (died before 1562) was an Italian painter of the late-Renaissance, active in Genoa.

He was born in Zoagli. He was a pupil of Ludovico Brea, and painted in collaboration with Andrea Semini.
