= Sant'Angelo, Milan =

Church in Milan, Italy

Coordinates: 45°28′33″N 9°11′34″E

Church of Sant'Angelo (Basilica di Sant'Angelo)
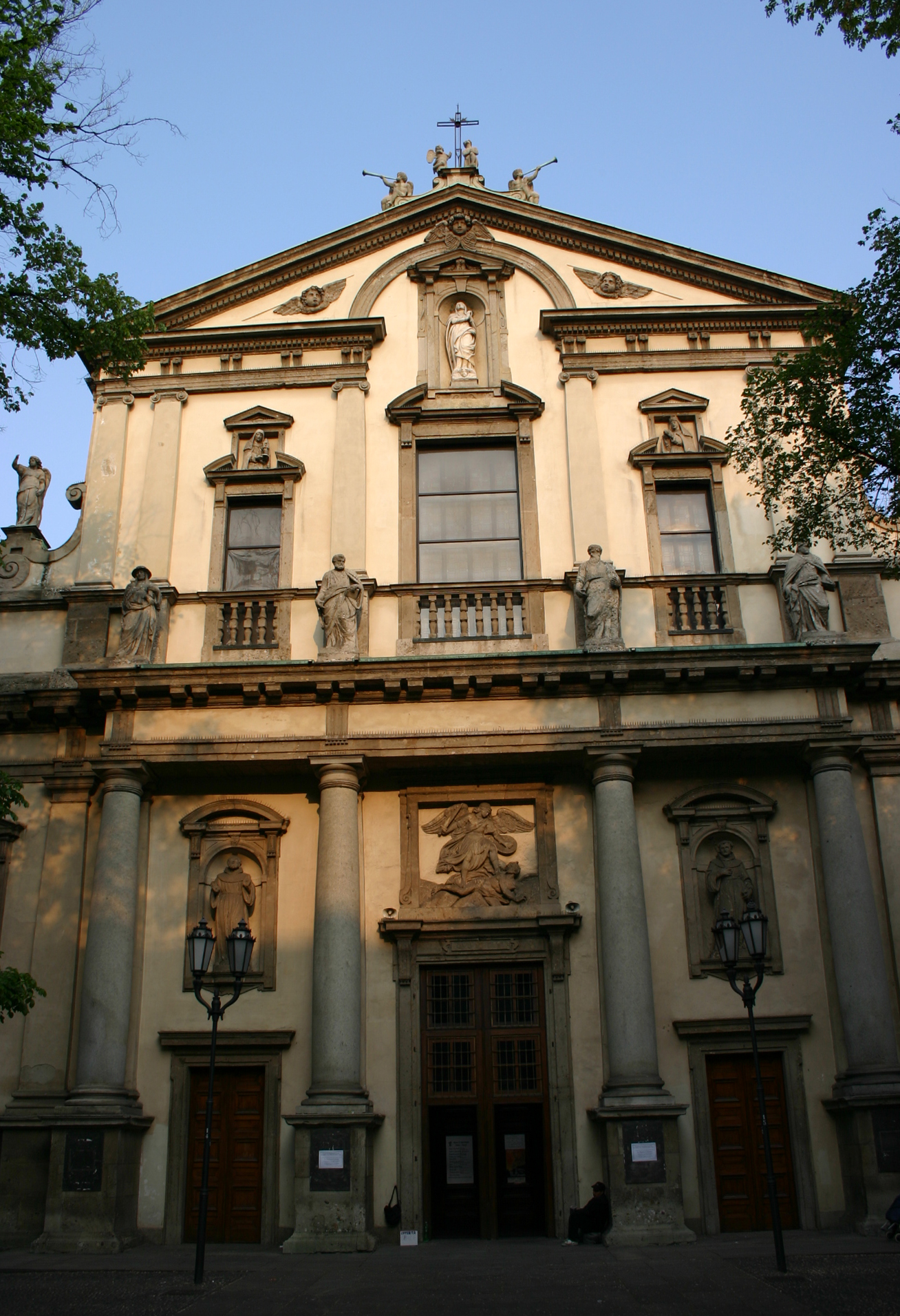
- Façade of the church.

Religion
- Affiliation: Roman Catholic
- Province: Milan
- Status: Active

Location
- Location: Milan, Italy
- Interactive map of Church of Sant'Angelo (Basilica di Sant'Angelo)

Architecture
- Type: Church
- Style: Baroque
- Groundbreaking: 16c
- Completed: 18c

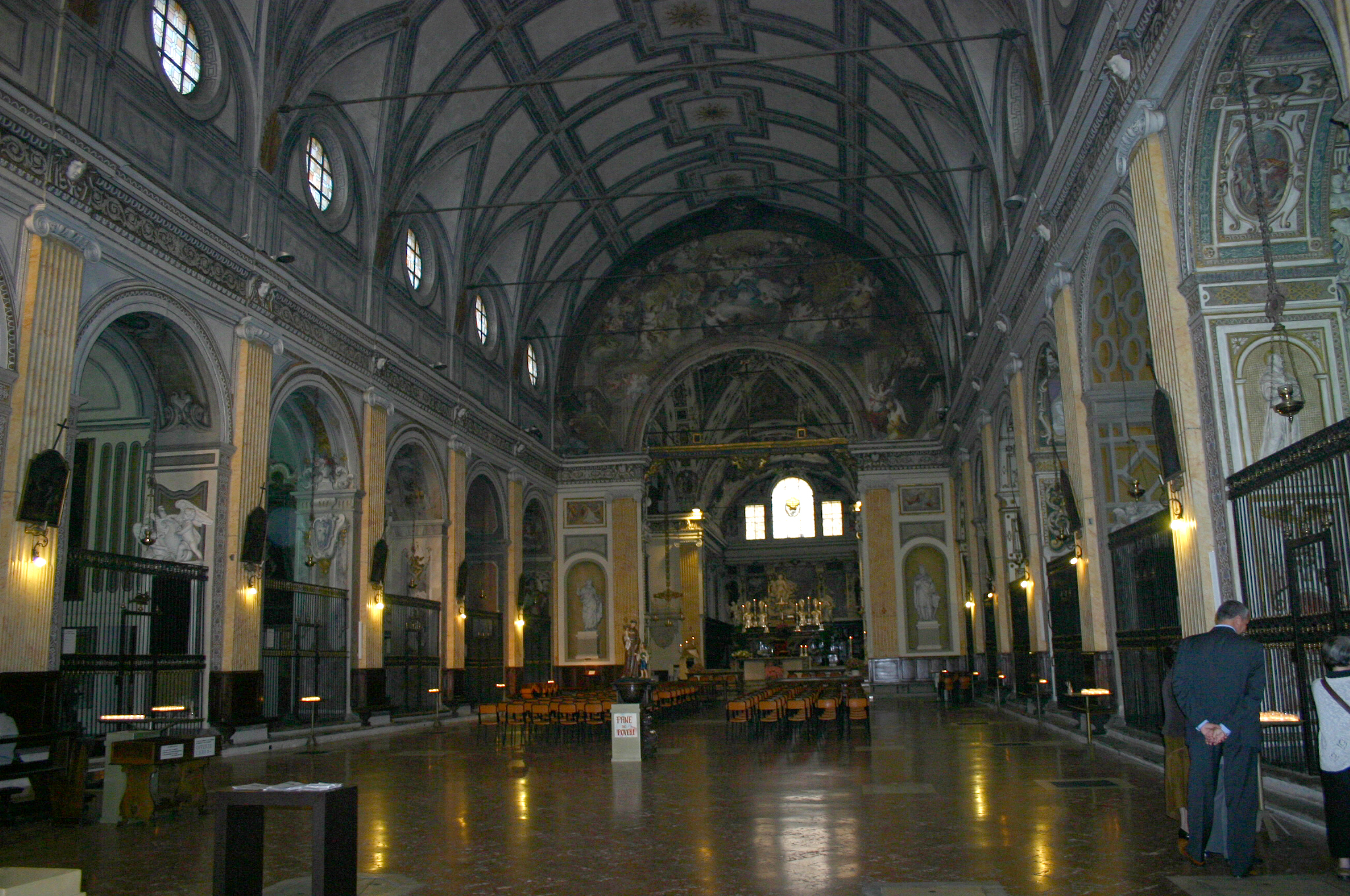
Nave

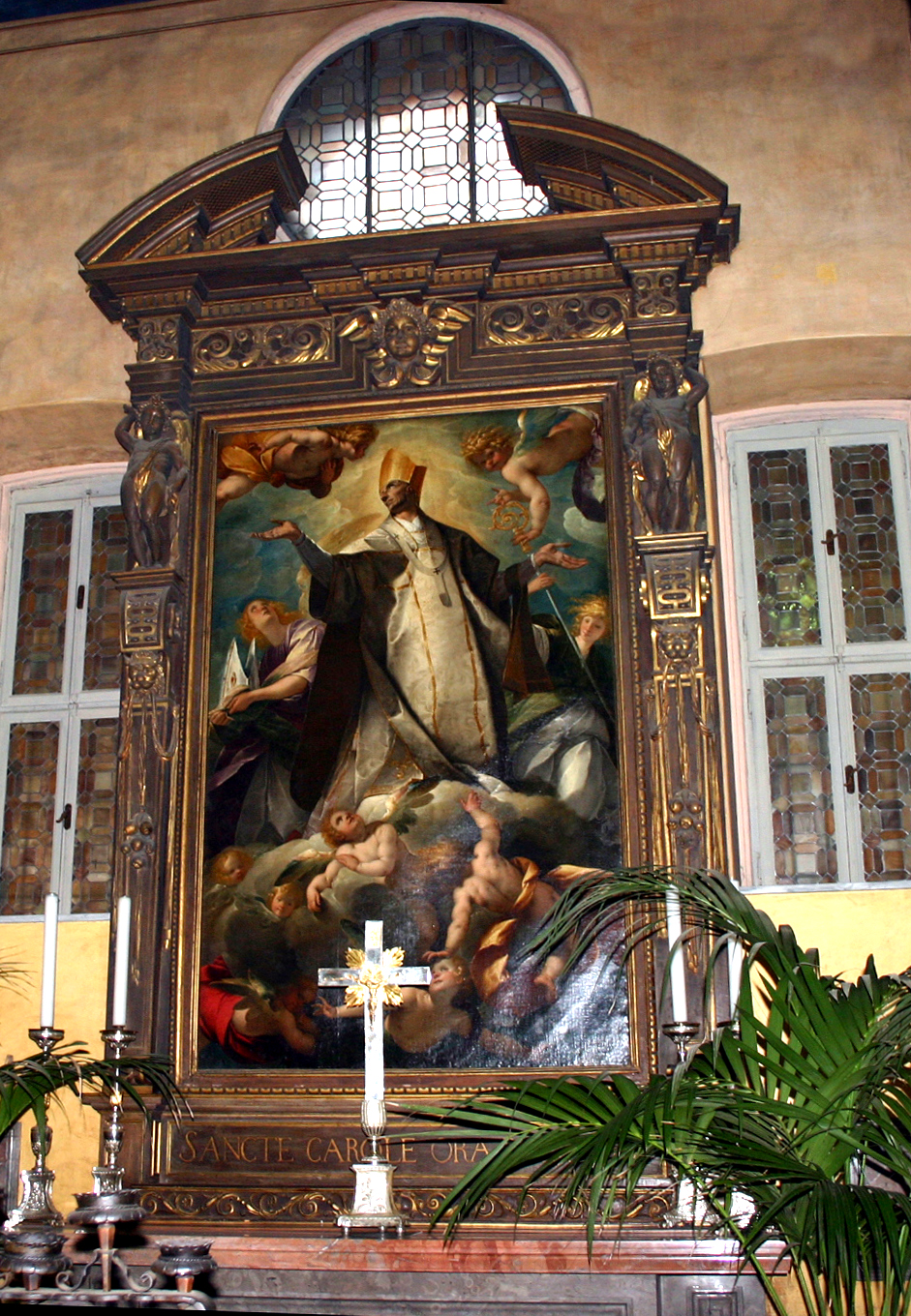
Glory of St. Charles Borromeo, by Morazzone.

Sant'Angelo (officially Santa Maria degli Angeli) is a church in Milan, Lombardy, northern Italy, belonging to the Franciscan Order.

== History ==
The church was constructed in the mid-16th century by the Spanish general and Governor Milan Ferrante Gonzaga, over an edifice already existing in 1418, in replacement of the eponymous one, which had been destroyed to build the new walls. The design was by Domenico Giunti. The small bell tower was added in 1607, while the façade was finished only in 1630, in late-Mannerist or early-Baroque style. The church is one of the few in the city which was not restored in "neo-medieval" style during the 19th century.

It has a single nave with side chapels and barrel vault, a transept and a deep presbytery. Artworks include works by Gaudenzio Ferrari (chapel of St. Catherine, now replaced by a copy; the original is in the Pinacoteca di Brera), Antonio Campi (same chapel), Morazzone (a St. Charles Borromeo in Glory), Simone Peterzano (frescoes in the St. Anthony Chapel), Ottavio Semino (Brasca Chapel in the transept), Camillo Procaccini (frescoes in the transept and in several chapels) and Giulio Cesare Procaccini (a Nativity, in the Rococo-style sacristy).

The triumphal arch has a frescoes with a solemn Incoronation of Mary by Stefano Maria Legnani (Legnanino).

In the transept is the tomb of Blessed Beatrice Casati, the wife and widow of Francino Rusca, the Earl of Locarno. She raised four children—three sons and one daughter, the latter of whom placed this monument to their mother—and was a devout member of the Franciscan tertiaries. She died in 1490.

Her epitaph reads, “Here lies Beatrix, the shining jewel of the Rusca family, who was married to Count Francino. When she was left a widow, the sacred Franciscan Order sustained her in wonderful chastity under the shelter of your wings, and the Third Order provided her with a regime for living such that she rejoices with those who have been blessed by God above.”

The convent is a 20th-century addition.

== Funerals ==
The funerals of the Countess and fashion designer Marta Marzotto took place in Sant'Angelo on 1 August 2016.
