= Seminis (disambiguation) =

Seminis is an American developer, grower and marketer of fruit and vegetable seeds.

Seminis may also refer to:

- Receptaculum seminis, an organ of the female reproductive tract in insects, some molluscs, oligochaeta worms and certain other invertebrates and vertebrates

== See also ==
- Semini (disambiguation)
