= Ludovico Brea =

Italian painter

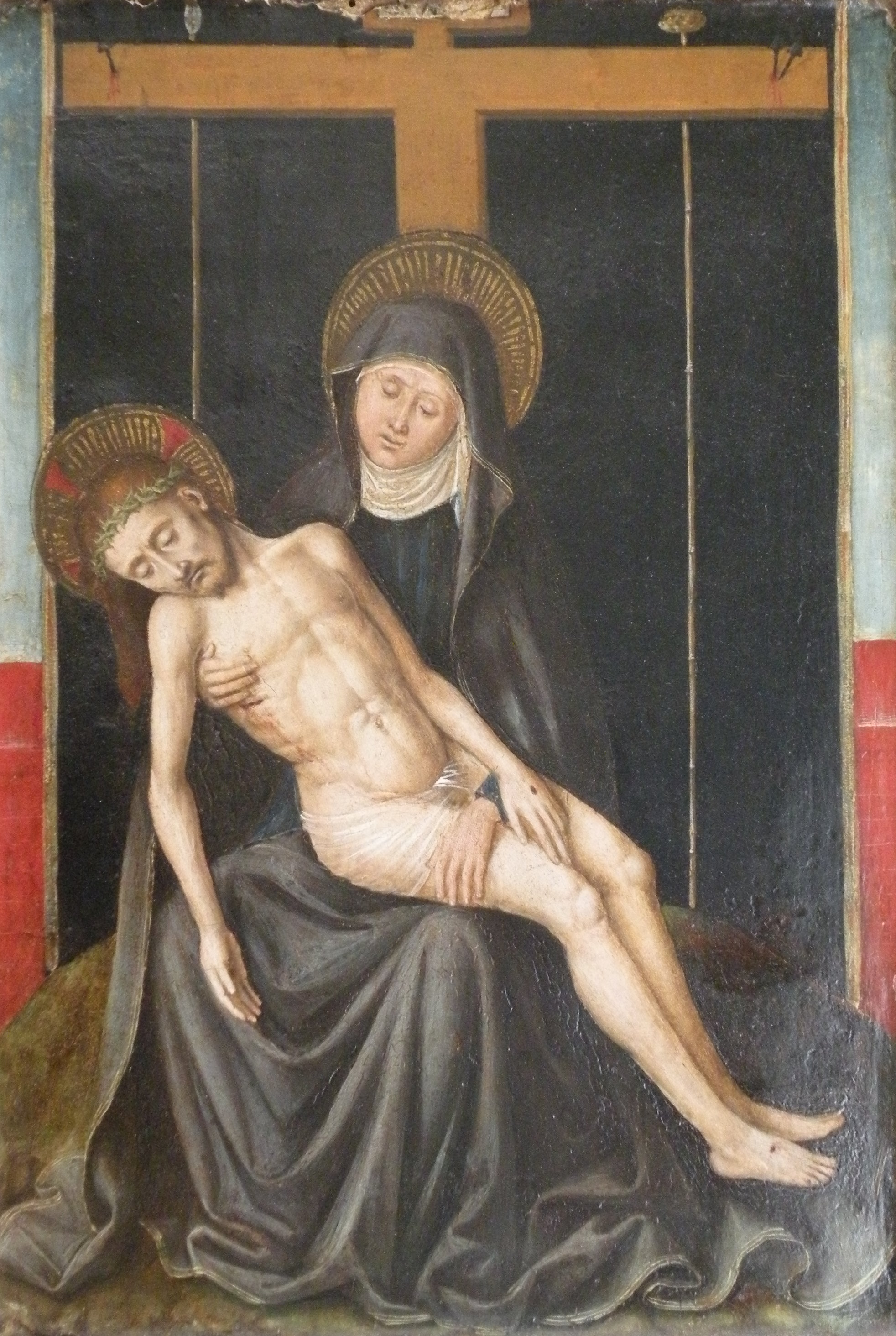
Ludovico Brea, Pietà, Musée du Louvre

Ludovico (or Louis) Brea (c. 1450 – c. 1523) was an Italian painter of the Renaissance, active mainly in and near Genoa.

Brea was born into a family of coopers in Nice, and later moving to Liguria, he painted numerous altarpieces that displayed both Lombardy and Flemish influences. One of his pupils was Teramo Piaggio.

His earliest definite work is the Mercy between Saint Martino and Catherine of Alexandria, painted for the monastery of Cimiez, near Nice, in 1475; recent historical searches have also suggested his having painted the Madonna of the Confraternity of the Misericordia at Nice in 1465. Other notable works by Brea can be found along all the coast from Monaco to Mentone, from Taggia to Imperia (where the influence of the Lombardy painter Vincenzo Foppa can be seen, and during which time he was in the service of Pope Julius II), and from Savona to Genoa, where he was active from 1483, leaving his work to the Church of the Consolation.

In Liguria, Ludovico's siblings Peter and Antonio Brea also operated as painters, as did Antonio's son, Francisco Brea (of whom details are only known for the period from 1512 to 1555).

== Notable works and their locations ==
- Piety (1475), Monastère de Cimiez
- Crucifixion (1481), Gallery of the White Palace, Genoa
- Ascension (1483), Galleria Durazzo Giustiniani
- Madonna of Misericordia (Madonna of Mercy) (1483–84)
- Polyptych of San Caterina (1488) and Baptism of Christ (1495), both at the Dominican church and convent, Taggia
- Piety, Monaco Cathedral
- Maestà, church of Arcs-Van
- Altarpiece of Savona Cathedral (1490), in collaboration with Vincenzo Foppa
- Altarpiece of Ognissanti (1512), San Maria di Castello, Genoa
- Polyptych of San Giorgio (1516), church of Montalto
