= Loggia della Mercanzia (Genova) =

Historical building in Genoa, Italy

Coordinates: 44°24′33.82″N 8°55′48.26″E

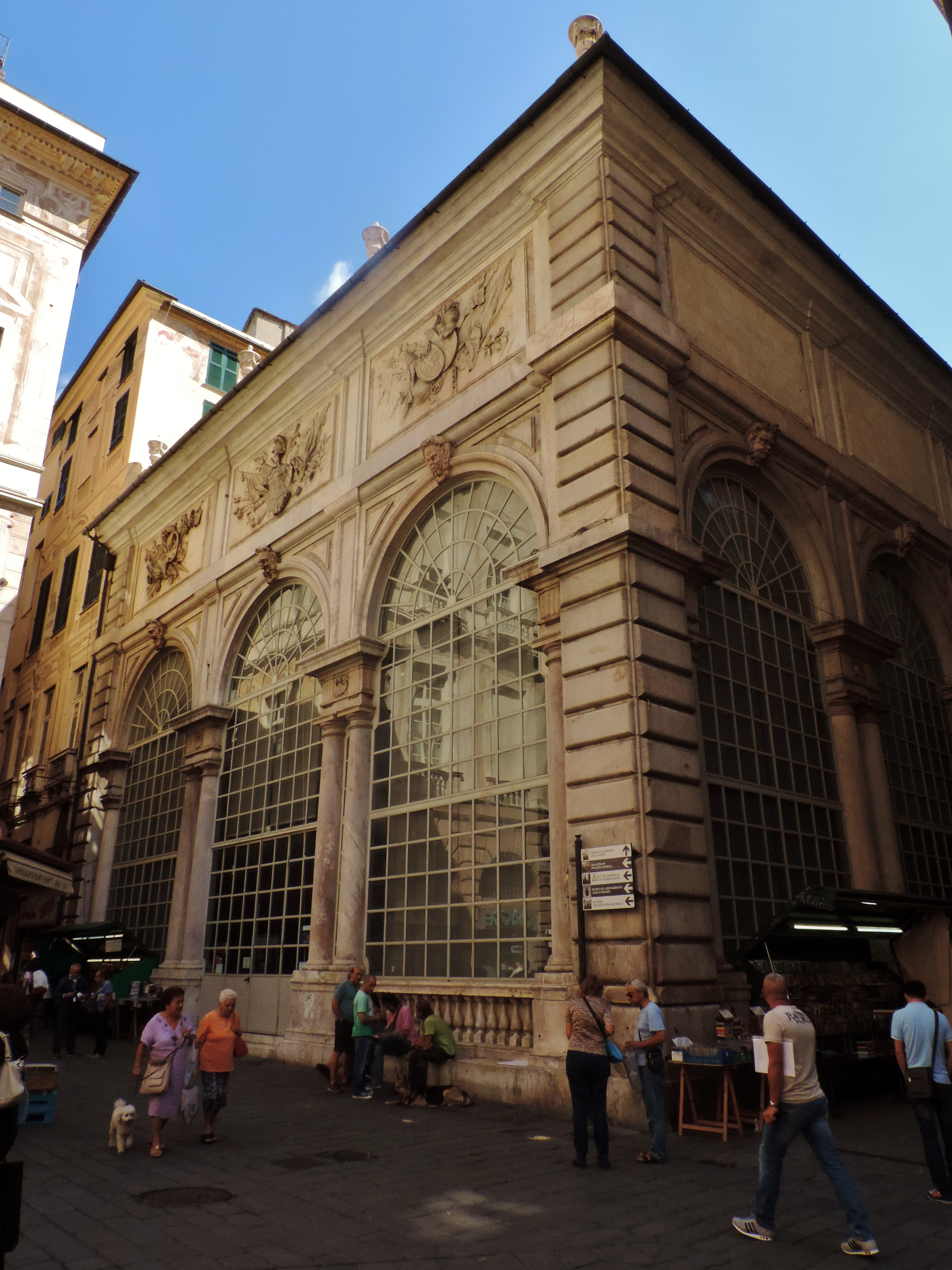
The Loggia

The Loggia della Mercanzia (also known as Loggia di Banchi or Loggia dei Mercanti) is one of the most representative buildings in the historical centre of Genoa. It is located in Piazza Banchi, at the corner with Via San Luca, in the ancient sestiere of the Maddalena, not far from the church of San Pietro in Banchi, in the commercial heart of the ancient city.

== History ==
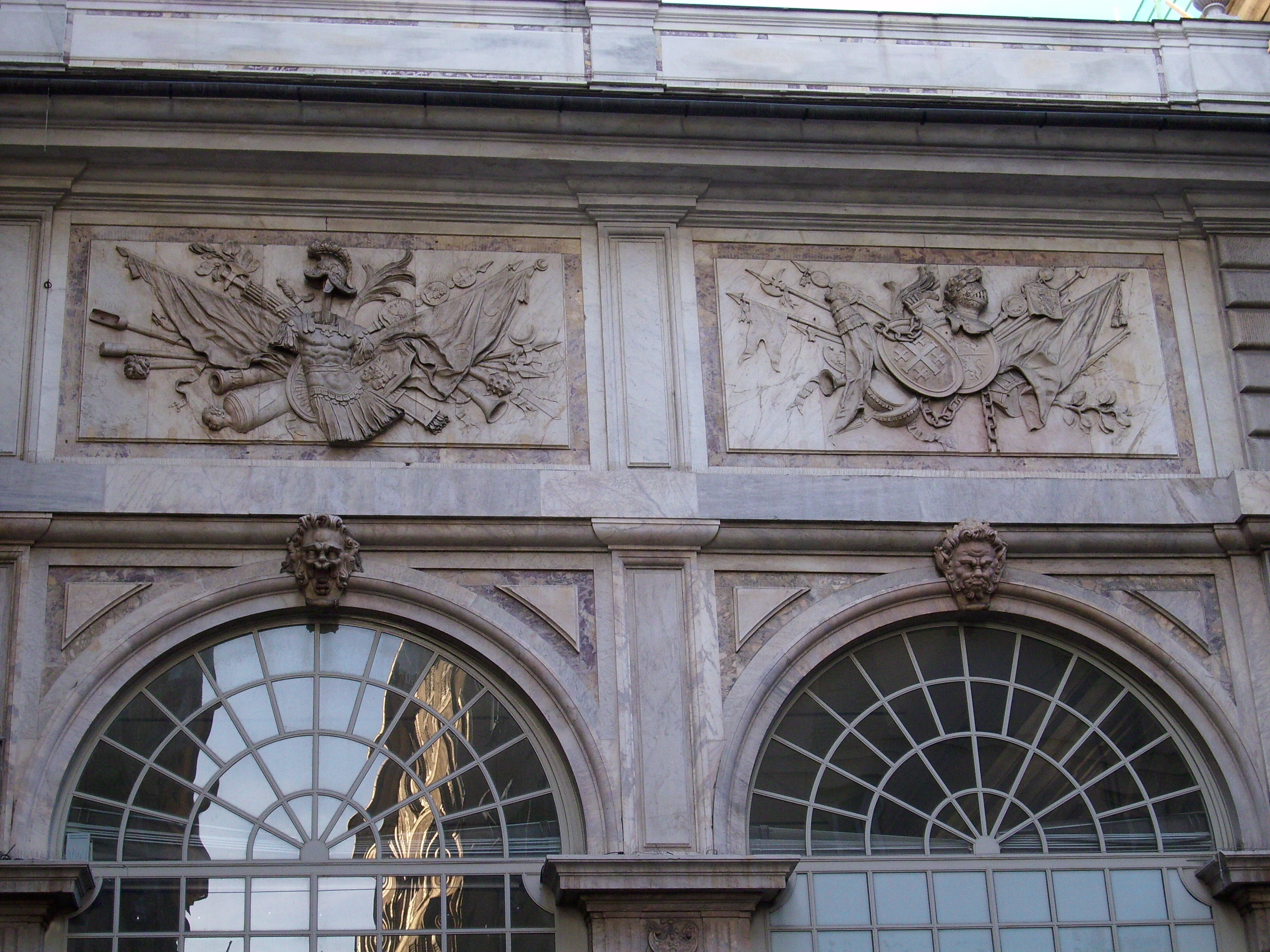
Particular of the reliefs on the facade

The origins of this building date back to the Middle Ages, when in the area adjacent to the port goods and currencies were traded. The construction of the building was ordered by the Padri del Comune, the city's administrators, in the context of the urban planning of Piazza Banchi (so called because of the presence of the currency exchange banks), after a fire at the end of the 14th century.

A first building intended to house the trading of merchants and bankers was built in 1415. In the centre was a large stone where the cintraco, i.e. the public auctioneer, read aloud the orders issued by the authorities. The original building, seriously damaged by a fire in 1455 and subsequently restored, was replaced towards the end of the 16th century by the current one, built between 1589 and 1595, whose design is attributed to Andrea Ceresola, known as il Vannone, with the collaboration of Giovanni Ponzello. Over the years it has undergone various decorative interventions.

The loggia was ceded to the Chamber of Commerce in 1839 and underwent a general renovation to a design by Giovanni Battista Resasco: on this occasion the two open sides, those facing Piazza Banchi and Via Banchi, were closed with windows. From 1855 it housed the Genoa Stock Exchange and the Commodities Exchange. In 1912 the former was transferred to the new premises in Piazza De Ferrari, while the Commodity Exchange remained in Banchi.

Due to an aerial bombardment in 1942, the roof, which had a pavilion vault with a wooden structure, was destroyed by a fire; in 1950 after restoration and reconstruction of the roof with metal reinforcement, the loggia was reopened and used for cultural activities, including exhibitions and cultural events of various kinds.

In December 2020 the final project for the construction of the Museum of the History of the City of Genoa was presented to the City Council. In 2021, some remains of the medieval city were found during work in the Loggia. Following the discovery, archaeological excavations began to unearth the remains of the ancient city. The remains are identified as a part of the quarter attributed to the Usodimare family, some shops, currency exchange counters and other structures are exhumed, as well as deposits of valuable materials. The archaeological site can be visited within the Museum of the History of the City of Genoa. The structure remains closed to the public to date while work is being carried out; the museum is scheduled to open in the year 2025.

== Description ==
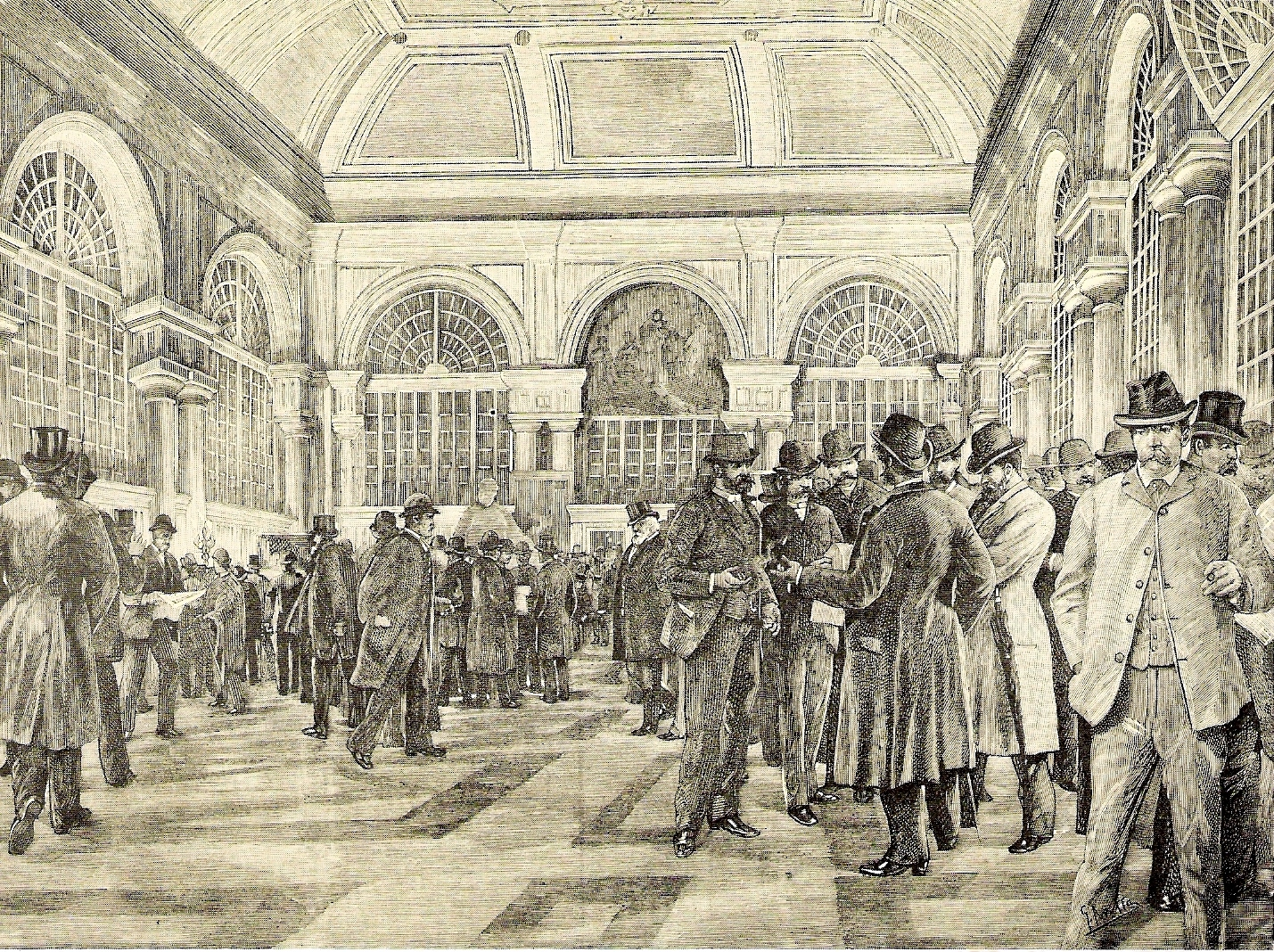
Engraving depicting the interior of the loggia in the 19th century

The interior presents itself as a single room with a rectangular plan with the vault (architecture) supported by a series of columns doric twin columns around the perimeter, with no internal supporting elements. The arches facing Via and Piazza Banchi are, as mentioned, closed by windows, while those facing Piazza Senarega and those leaning against the adjacent building are blind.

On the back wall is a fresco, painted at the end of the 16th century by the Tuscan painter Pietro Sorri, depicting the Madonna Enthroned with Child and Saints John the Baptist and George, patron saints of Genoa. The painting was saved from the fire following the 1942 bombing, while the one in the vault, by Giovanni Battista Brignole, depicting the coat of arms of the Republic of Genoa, was destroyed.

All’esterno lo spazio al di sopra degli archi è decorato con una serie di bassorilievi raffiguranti trofei d’armi, realizzati da Taddeo Carlone.

== Bibliography ==
- Guida d’Italia – Liguria, Milano, TCI, 2009.
- Fiorella Caraceni Poleggi, Genova – Guida Sagep, SAGEP Editrice – Automobile Club di Genova, 1984.
- Autori vari, Descrizione di Genova e del Genovesato, vol. III, Genova, Tipografia Ferrando, 1846.
