= Antonio Semini =

Italian painter (1485–1554)

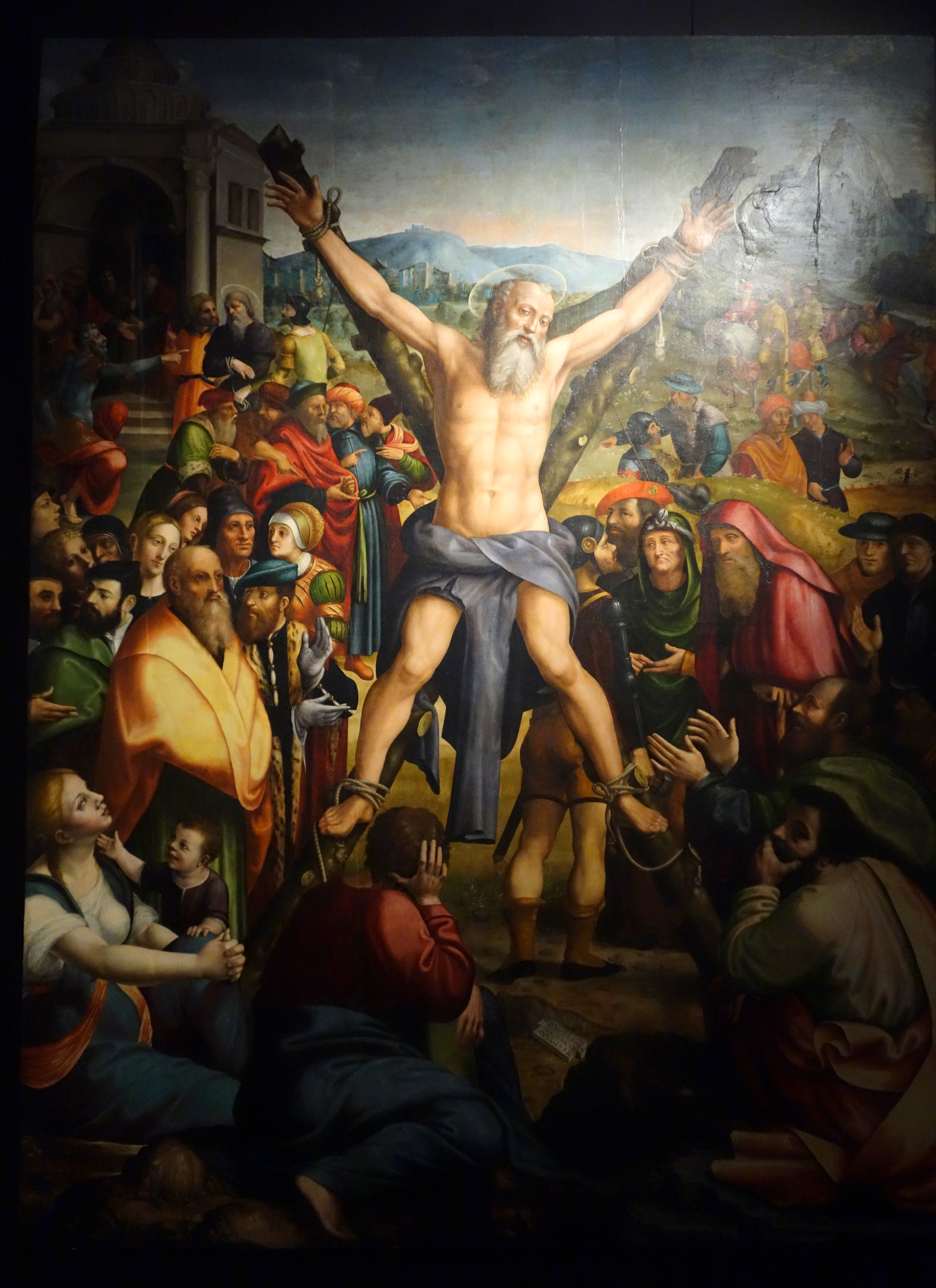
Martyrdom of Saint Andrew by Antonio Semini and Teramo Piaggio, 1532

Antonio Semini (c. 1485 – after 1547) was an Italian painter of the late Renaissance, active in his native Genoa.

He was born and trained in Genoa and died in Milan. He was the pupil of Ludovico Brea, and painted in collaboration with Teramo Piaggio. Antonio painted a Nativity for S. Domenico, Savona. Among his pupils were his sons Andrea and Ottavio Semini.

== Sources ==
- Champlin, John Denison (1887). Charles Callahan Perkins (ed.). Cyclopedia of Painters and Paintings (Volume IV). Milan: Gaetano Schiepatti. pp. 170. "Denison Champlin Callahan."
