= Ottavio Semini =

Italian painter

Ottavio Semini (c. 1530–1604) was an Italian painter of the late-Renaissance.

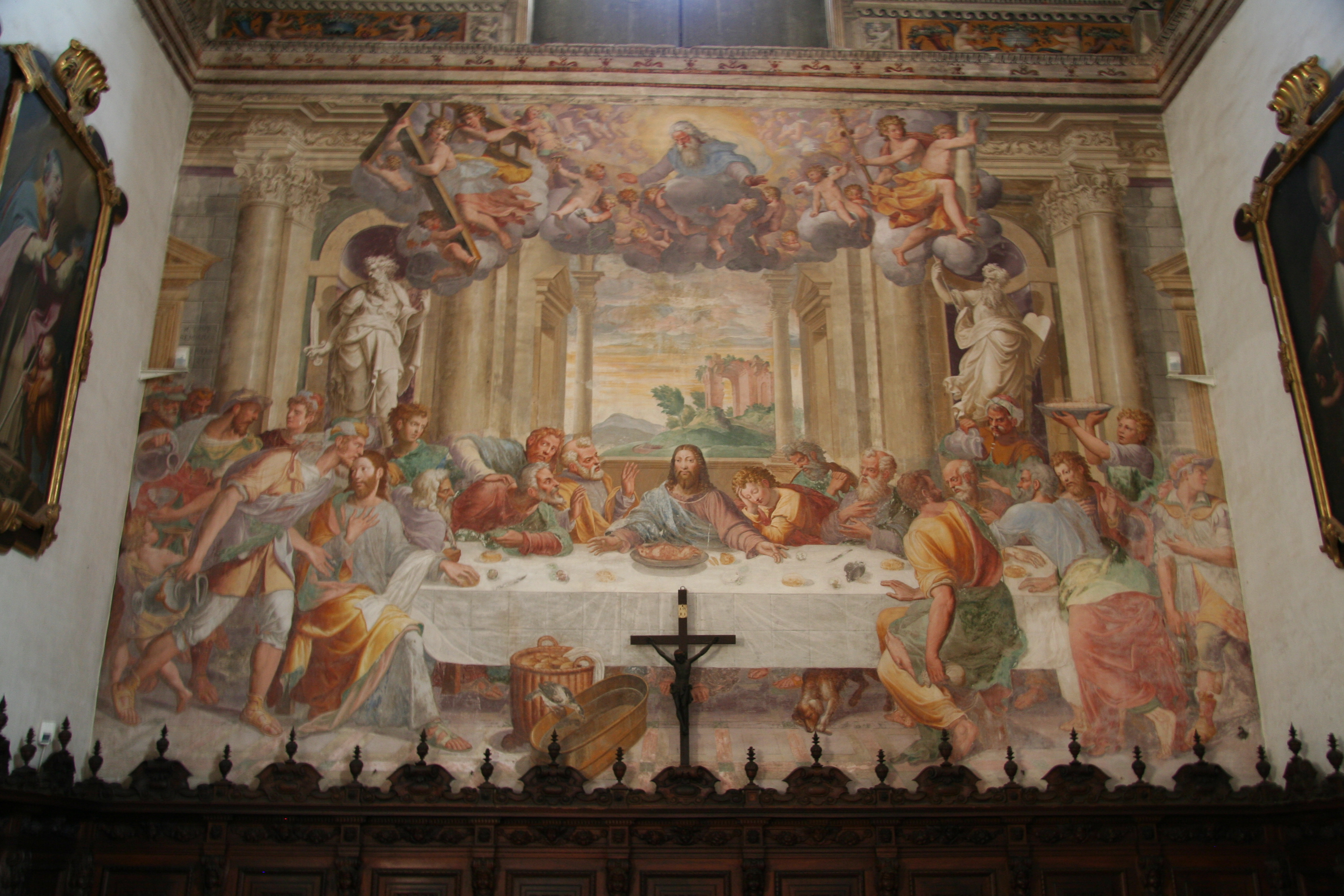
Last Supper by Ottavio Semini, located in the refectory of the Certosa di Pavia

He was born and trained in Genoa and died in Milan. He was the son and pupil of Antonio Semini, and was influenced by Perino del Vaga. Aided his brother Andrea in many works, but was obliged to leave Genoa on account of a homicide and rape, and afterwards led a dissipated life in Milan. He helped paint for the chapel of San Girolamo in Sant'Angelo in Milan. With his brother, Andrea Semini, he frescoed some salons the Palazzo Marino in Milan. He may have committed suicide. Among his pupils were Paolo Camillo Landriani and Niccolosio Granielli.

The large fresco of the Last Supper, located in the refectory of the Certosa di Pavia was painted by Ottavio Semini in 1567.
