= Andrea Semini =

Italian painter

Andrea Semini (or Semino; 1525–1594) was an Italian painter of the late-Renaissance, active mainly in his native Genoa.

He was born in Genoa, son and pupil of the painter Antonio Semini. After studying some time under his father, together with his brother Ottavio he went to Rome, and they realized some work in collaboration (frescoes in the Palazzo Marino in Milan).

He is well known for his frescoes in several palaces in Genoa, painting for churches and portraits.
