= PAK5 =

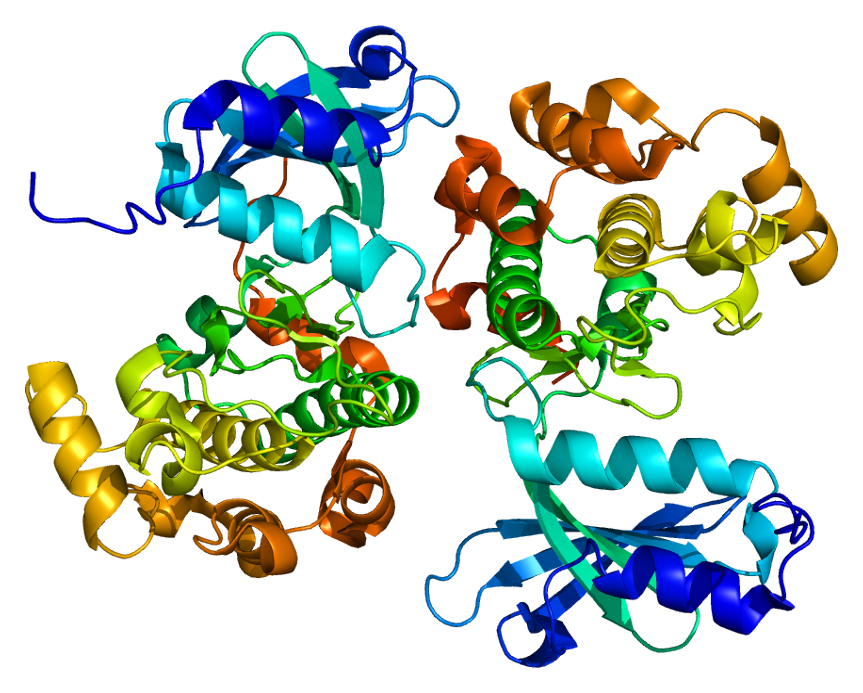

Identifiers
- Aliases: PAK5, PAK7, p21 (RAC1) activated kinase 7, p21 (RAC1) activated kinase 5
- External IDs: OMIM: 608038; MGI: 1920334; GeneCards: PAK5
Available structures
PDB	Ortholog search: PDBe RCSB
PDB	List of PDB id codes 2F57
Enzyme activity
EC #	BRENDA	ExPASy	KEGG	MetaCyc
2.7.11.1	↗	↗	↗	↗

Gene location (Human)
Chr.	Chromosome 20 (human)
Band	20p12.2	Start	9,537,370 bp
Band	20p12.2	End	9,839,076 bp

Gene location (Mouse)
Chr.	Chromosome 2 (mouse)
Band	2|2 F3	Start	135,923,024 bp
Band	2|2 F3	End	136,229,887 bp
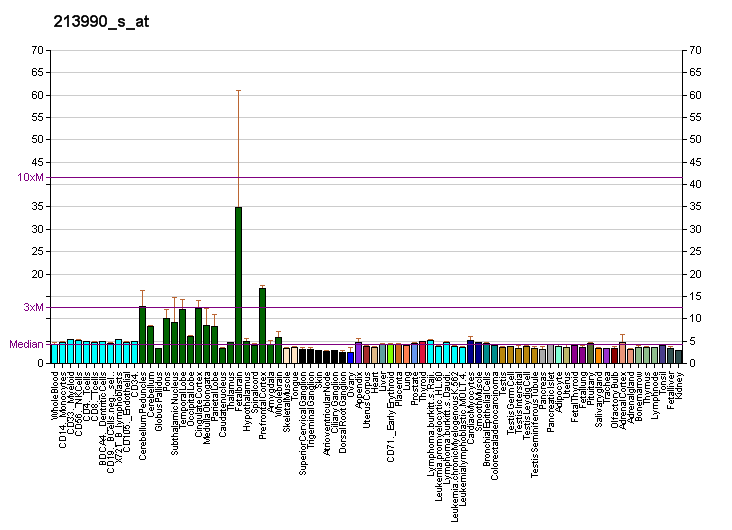

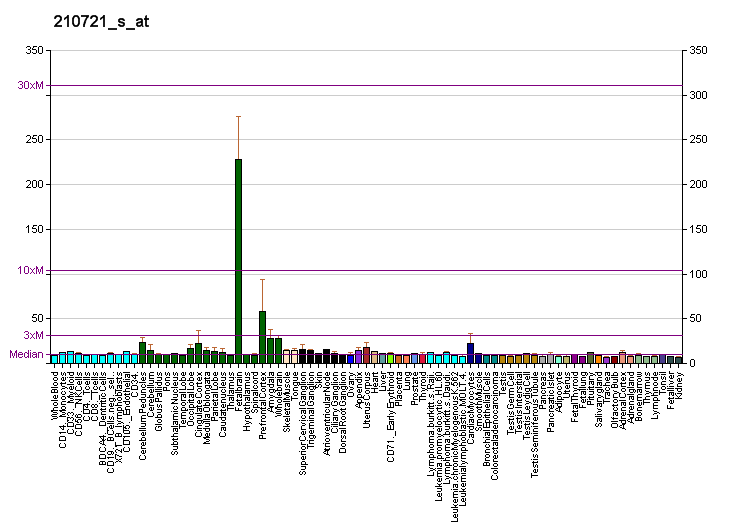
RNA expression pattern
Bgee	Human / Mouse (ortholog); Top expressed in: middle temporal gyrus; ganglionic eminence; Brodmann area 23; cerebellar vermis; endothelial cell; primary visual cortex; Brodmann area 46; buccal mucosa cell; cerebellar hemisphere; prefrontal cortex / Top expressed in: lumbar subsegment of spinal cord; zygote; Rostral migratory stream; secondary oocyte; primary motor cortex; primary oocyte; retinal pigment epithelium; ganglionic eminence; primary visual cortex; superior frontal gyrus; More reference expression data
BioGPS	More reference expression data
Gene ontology
Molecular function	transferase activity; nucleotide binding; protein kinase activity; kinase activity; ATP binding; protein binding; protein serine/threonine kinase activity
Cellular component	cytoplasm; mitochondrion; nucleus; nucleoplasm; synapse
Biological process	locomotory behavior; phosphorylation; negative regulation of extrinsic apoptotic signaling pathway; memory; learning; protein phosphorylation; cytoskeleton organization; cell population proliferation; cell migration; signal transduction; apoptotic process; Rho protein signal transduction; regulation of mitotic cell cycle; actin cytoskeleton organization; stress-activated protein kinase signaling cascade; activation of protein kinase activity; regulation of apoptotic process; regulation of MAPK cascade; cell growth; regulation of cell growth
Sources:Amigo / QuickGO
Orthologs
Databases	NCBI: entry; OMA: entry
Species	Human	Mouse
Entrez	57144	241656
Ensembl	ENSG00000101349	ENSMUSG00000039913
UniProt	Q9P286	Q8C015
RefSeq (mRNA)	NM_020341; NM_177990	NM_172858; NM_001360382; NM_001360384
RefSeq (protein)	NP_065074; NP_817127	NP_766446; NP_001347311; NP_001347313
Location (UCSC)	Chr 20: 9.54 – 9.84 Mb	Chr 2: 135.92 – 136.23 Mb
PubMed search
- Wikidata
View/Edit Human	View/Edit Mouse

Serine/threonine-protein kinase PAK 5 is an enzyme that in humans is encoded by the PAK5 gene.

The PAK5 enzyme is one of three members of Group II PAK family of serine/threonine kinases, and evolutionary conserved across species.

== Discovery ==
The PAK5 was initially cloned as a brain-specific kinase with a predominant expression in brain with a suggested role in neurite growth in neuronal cells. Selectivity of PAK5 signaling was recognized by its ability to stimulate the JNK kinase but not p38 or ERK kinases.

== Gene and spliced variants ==
The PAK5 gene, the longest among the PAK family, contains a total of 12 exons of which four exons are for 5'-UTR and remaining 8 exons for protein coding(Gene from review). Alternative exon splicing of the PAK5 gene generates three transcripts, and one of the transcript encodes a 719 amino acids long protein(Gene from review). The exon splicing of the murine PAK5 gene generates three transcripts, two of which code an identical 719 amino acids long polypeptide while the 2.0-kb transcript is a non-coding RNA with retained intron.

== Protein domains ==
Similar to PAK4, PAK5 consists of a kinase, a CDC42/Rac1 interactive binding (CRIB) motif.

== Function ==
The protein encoded by this gene is a member of the PAK family of Ser/Thr protein kinases. PAK family members are known to be effectors of Rac/Cdc42 GTPases, which have been implicated in the regulation of cytoskeletal dynamics, proliferation, and cell survival signaling. This kinase contains a CDC42/Rac1 interactive binding (CRIB) motif, and has been shown to bind CDC42 in the presence of GTP.

This kinase is predominantly expressed in brain. It is capable of promoting neurite outgrowth, and thus may play a role in neurite development. This kinase is associated with microtubule networks and induces microtubule stabilization. The subcellular localization of this kinase is tightly regulated during cell cycle progression. Alternatively spliced transcript variants encoding the same protein have been described.

Genetic deletion of PAK5 with or without PAK6 deletion in mice has been shown to be associated with a defective locomotion, memory, and learning. PAK5 is co-expressed with DISC1, a psychosis risk gene, and the pathway is likely to be involved in modulating synapse plasticity. Physiological level of PAK5 is linked with an overall physical activity in mice as PAK5 deletion in mice has been shown to be associated with an increased activity upon amphetamine stimulation. PAK5 has been also thought to be one of genetic variants regulating gene expression (eQTL) and its expression associates with an inhibited glucose-regulated secretion of insulin in INS1 cells.

== Upstream regulators ==
PAK5 expression is positively regulated by Aurora-A and both PAK5 and Aurora-A are co-upregulated in esophageal squamous carcinoma. The levels of PAK5 are regulated by miR-129 in hepatocacinoma cancer cells, and by the binding of the long non-coding RNA Colorectal neoplasia differentially expressed (CRNDE) to miR-186 in glioma cells.

== Downstream targets ==
PAK5 phosphorylates Pacsin-1 and Synaptojanin-1 and regulates synaptic vesicle trafficking. PAK5-mediated phosphorylation of GATA1 at S161 and S187 contributes to Epithelial-mesenchymal transition. PAK5 phosphorylation of p120-catenin at S288 plays a role in cytoskeleton remodeling. In addition to the cytoplasm, the PAK5 also localizes in mitochondria and phosphorylates BAD at S112. PAK5 inhibits the MARK2/Par1 activity and modulates microtubules dynamics.

== Clinical significance ==
PAK5 levels are upregulated in osteosarcoma, hepatocellular carcinomas, gastric cancer, glioma, esophageal squamous cell cancer, colon cancer, ovarian cancer, and breast cancer. There are also examples of gain-of-function activating PAK5 mutations in non-small-cell lung cancer lung cancer. PAK5 promotes the cell survival and sensitivity of cancer cells to chemotherapy.
