= University of Genoa =

University in Italy

Coordinates: 44.4150°N 8.9258°E

- Università di Genova
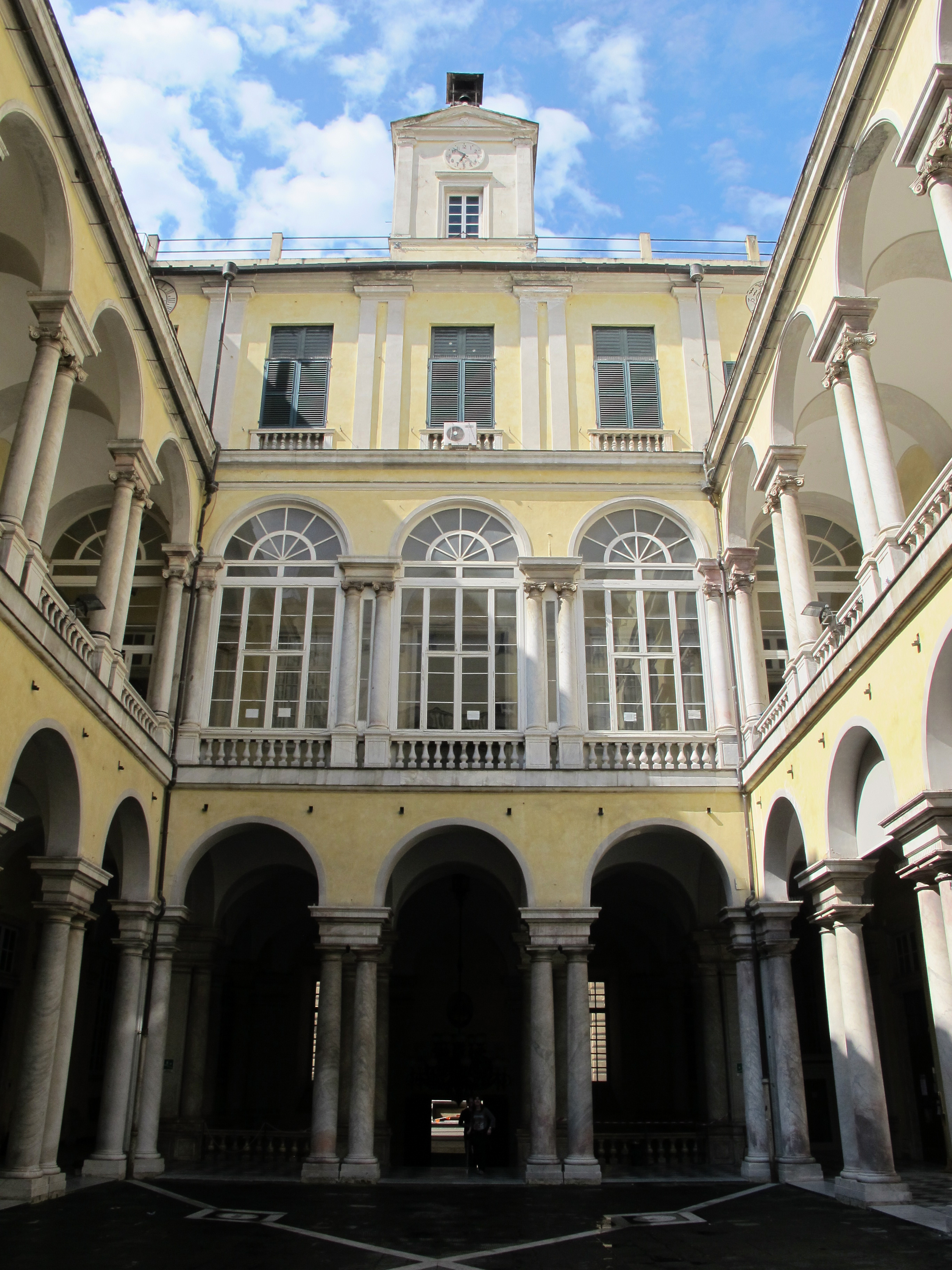
- Latin: Genuense Athenaeum
- Type: State-supported
- Established: 1481; 545 years ago
- Affiliations: EUA, CoNiSMA, Consorzio Nettuno
- Rector: Federico Delfino
- Administrative staff: 1,711
- Students: ~ 31,860
- Location: Genoa, Italy
- Campus: Urban
- Sports teams: CUS Genova
- Website: www.unige.it

The University of Genoa (Italian: Università di Genova, abbreviated as UniGe), is a public research university. It is one of the largest universities in Italy and it is located in the city of Genoa, on the Italian Riviera in the Liguria region of northwestern Italy. The original university was founded in 1481.

== Campuses ==
The University of Genoa is organized in several independent campuses located in different city areas:

- The Balbi campus: includes the Rectorate, the central administration offices, the departments of Economics, Humanities, Philosophy, Languages, Law and Political Science;
- The Sarzano campus: includes the departments of Education Sciences and Architecture;
- The Albaro campus: comprises the departments of Engineering;
- The Valletta Puggia campus: comprises the Departments of Mathematics, Physics and Chemistry;
- The San Martino campus: comprises the Departments of Medicine and Earth Sciences;

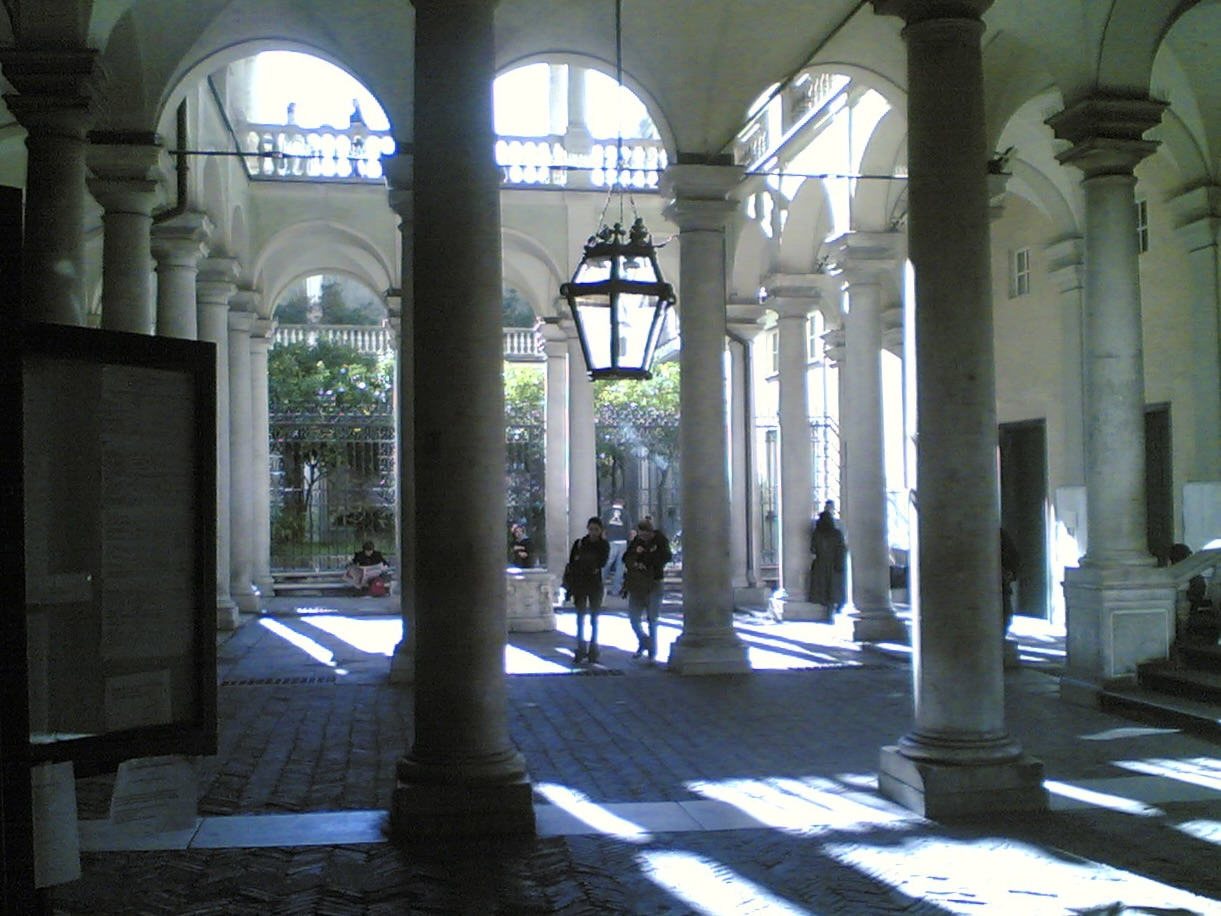
School of Humanities

Of great historical and artistic interest are the buildings in Via Balbi and in particular: the main university premises (via Balbi, 5) designed by the architect Bartolomeo Bianco and built in 1640, Palazzo Balbi Cattaneo (via Balbi, 2), and Palazzo Balbi Senarega (via Balbi, 4). Also of major historical interest is the complex of Albergo dei Poveri (piazza Emanuele Brignole).

The university's botanical garden, the Orto Botanico dell'Università di Genova, occupies one hectare in the city center, just above the university's main building.

University of Genoa also has a number of regional campuses in Savona, Imperia, Ventimiglia and La Spezia. In particular,

- The Savona campus: hosts courses in Engineering, Medicine and Communication Sciences;
- The La Spezia campus: hosts courses in Engineering, Design, Economics and Law;
- The Imperia campus: hosts courses in Law and Economics.

Near Ventimiglia, the University of Genoa operates the Hanbury Botanical Garden, a Protected Area and candidate for UNESCO World Heritage status within the "Mediterranean Alps" project.

== History ==
In the 13th century in Genoa there were already Colleges which conferred degrees in law, theology, medicine and arts.

The College of Theology was established officially in 1471 with a papal bull of Sixtus IV (Francesco della Rovere). Some years after dates the promulgation of a Statute of the College of Medicine by the Council of the Elders in 1481.

In 1569, by a decree of the Senate of Republic of Genoa, the Colleges were incorporated into the schools run by the Jesuits. The Jesuits settled near the old Church of San Girolamo Del Rosso, and enlarged their premises by buying some land on which to house their College and schools. The building, which is now the main university premises, was designed by the architect Bartolomeo Bianco, and began to be used in 1640.

After the suppression of the Society of Jesus in 1773, a special committee reorganized the various courses of study, dividing them in higher education (Canon Law, Philosophy, Civil Law, Theology, Logic and Metaphysics, Physics) and primary education (courses in Rhetoric, Reading and Writing).

After the establishment of the French Empire, which absorbed the Republic of Genoa, higher education was subdivided into different special schools: Law, Medicine, Physical and Mathematical Sciences, Commerce, Language and Literature, Chemistry. The University of Genoa was affiliated to the Imperial University of Paris. It was reinstated as a separate university in 1812.

After the fall of Napoleon, the provisional Government of the Republic appointed a new Committee in charge of higher education, and at the Congress of Vienna in 1815, it was decided that the University of Genoa be entrusted to the Kingdom of Sardinia, enjoying the same privileges as those granted to the University of Turin. The university was closed owing to political disturbances between 1821 and 1823 and again between 1830 and 1835.

In 1870, two first technical institutes of higher education were established: the Royal Naval School and the Royal School of Economic Studies, that in 1936, were absorbed by the Royal University of Genoa, becoming the Faculties of Engineering and Economics respectively.

In the late 20th century, the university expanded rapidly, with new regional campuses. In 1996, some departments were established in Savona within a remodeled Army Barrack area. That campus hosts the Department of Engineering and also courses in Business. New laboratories have been made in Simulation, Logistics & Industrial Engineering, among others.

== Organization ==
=== Schools and Departments ===
As of the academic year 2012-2013, the university is headed by a rector and it was divided into 5 schools, comprising a total of 23 departments (one of which is inter-school):

- School of Natural Sciences, Mathematics and Physics
  - Department of Chemistry and Industrial Chemistry (DCCI)
  - Department of Physics (DIFI)
  - Department of Mathematics (DIMA)
  - Department of Earth, Environmental and Life Sciences (DISTAV)
  - Department of Computer Science, Bioengineering, Robotics and System Engineering (DIBRIS) inter-school department
- School of Medical and Pharmaceutical Sciences
  - Department of Pharmacy (DIFAR)
  - Department of Internal Medicine and Medical Specialties (DIMI)
  - Department of Experimental Medicine (DIMES)
  - Department of Neurosciences, Rehabilitation, Ophthalmology and Maternal-Fetal Medicine (DINOGMI)
  - Department of Surgical and Integrated Diagnostic Sciences (DISC)
  - Department of Health Sciences (DISSAL)
- School of Social Sciences
  - Department of Economics (DIEC)
  - Department of Law (DIGI)
  - Department of Science Education (DISFOR)
  - Department of Political Sciences (DISPO)
- School of Humanities
  - Department of Antics, Philosophy and History (DAFIST)
  - Department of Italian, Roman, Antics, Arts and Drama Studies (DIRAAS)
  - Department of Modern Cultures and Languages (DLCM)
- Polytechnic School
  - Department of Computer Science, Bioengineering, Robotics and System Engineering (DIBRIS) inter-school department
  - Department of Civil, Chemical and Environmental Engineering (DICCA)
  - Department of Mechanical, Energy, Management, and Transportation Engineering (DIME)
  - Department of Naval, Electrical, Electronic and Telecommunications Engineering (DITEN)
  - Department of Architectural Sciences (DAD)

The University of Genoa shares a branch campus of Florida International University in Miami, Florida, United States, in Genoa. The two universities mutually host students of either university's School of Architecture.

== Rankings ==
University rankings

Global – Overall
- ARWU World: 401–500
- QS World: =530 (2026)
- THE World: 401–500

In the ranking of Italian universities, the University of Genoa is ranked 13th by ARWU, 18th by QS, and 18th by THE.

The university is ranked 151–200 in Engineering - Civil and Structural in the QS World University Subject Rankings.

Times Higher Education gave the university a rank of 150+ in the Law category in its 2020 list of subjects.

According to Microsoft Academic Search 2016 rankings, the University of Genoa has high-ranking positions among the European universities in multiple computer science fields:

- in machine learning and pattern recognition the University of Genoa is the best scientific institution in Italy and is ranked 36th in Europe;
- in computer vision the University of Genoa is the best scientific institution in Italy and is ranked 34th in Europe;
- in computer graphics the University of Genoa is ranked 2nd institution in Italy and 35th in Europe.

== Students ==
In the academic year 21/22, the university has a student population around 39,766. Of these, 33,920 are students entrolled in bachelor's and master's degree courses; 3,328 are students enrolled in doctorate, master's or specialisation school courses. Finally, 2,518 are students enrolled in other courses. The number of freshmen was 6,293 and the number of graduating students was 5,257.

== Faculty ==
In 2021, there were 1,307 professors and scientific employees and 1,228 non-scientific employees working for University of Genoa.

== Honorary titles ==
Since its foundation, the University of Genoa has awarded 46 gold medals to Italian students and 2 gold medals to international students, namely the Israeli student Khor Hoksari in 1993 and the Albanian student Agasi Bledar in 2021. Since 1992, it has awarded 140 honorary degrees and 1 honorary doctorate. The most recent honorary titles granted are:

Honorary Laureate	Honorary degree	Year of award
Ivano Fossati	Letterature moderne e spettacolo	2023
Pietro Salini	Ingegneria civile	2022
Riccardo Muti	Scienze Internazionali e della Cooperazione	2019
Giuseppe Tornatore	Scienze Storiche	2017
Andrea Camilleri	Letterature moderne e spettacolo	2016
Giovanni Maria Flick	Economia e istituzioni finanziarie	2013
Mario Rigoni Stern	Scienze Politiche	2007

== Notable alumni ==
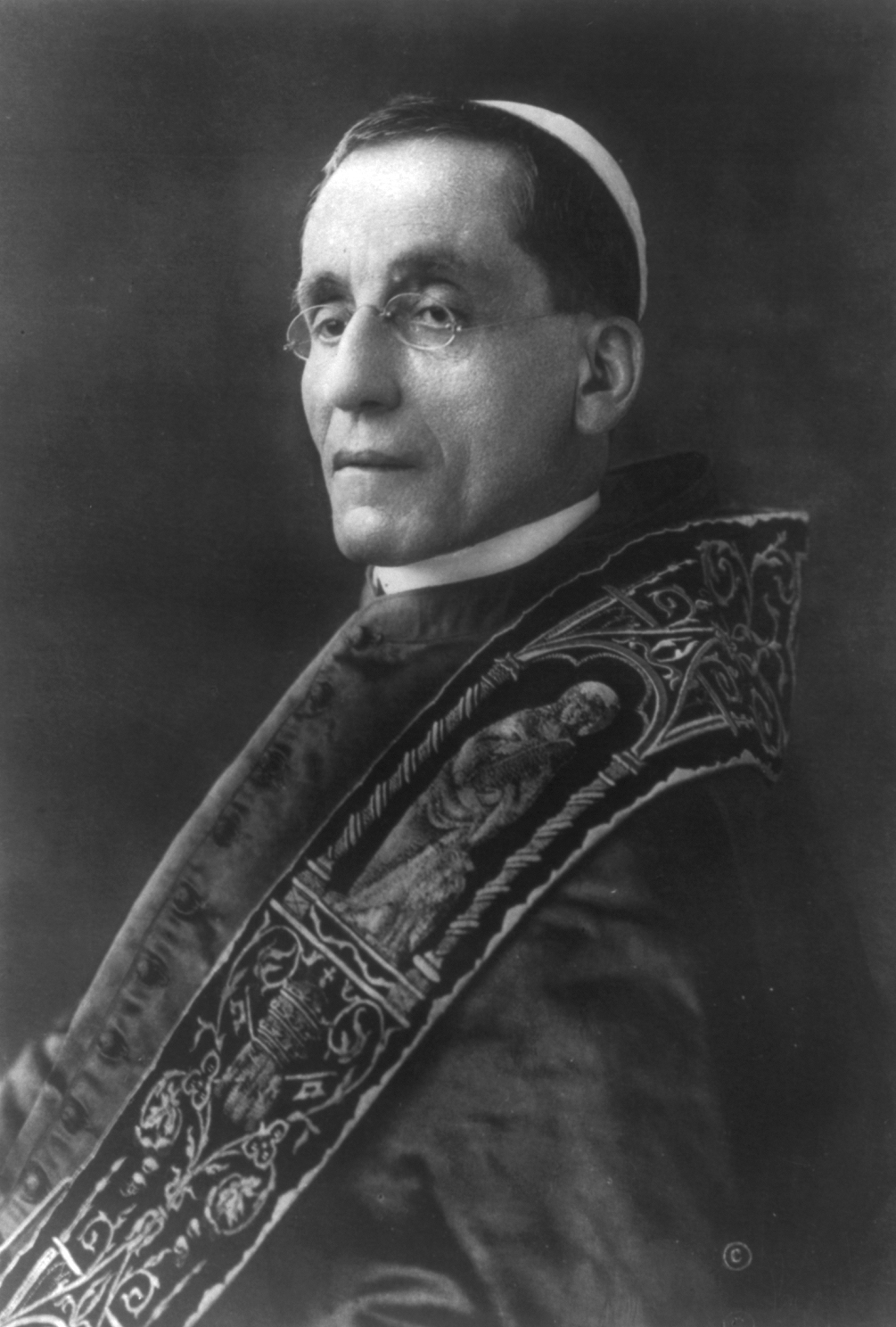
Giacomo Della Chiesa studied theology at Genoa and later became Pope Benedict XV

- Ornella Barra, founder of a pharmaceutical distribution company known as Di Pharma. Now chief executive of Alliance Healthcare, the Pharmaceutical Wholesale Division of Alliance Boots
- Carlo Maria Becchi, theoretical physicist
- Luigi Corradi, engineer and CEO of Trenitalia
- Gianaurelio Cuniberti, Italian scientist and professor
- Giacomo Della Chiesa, later Pope Benedict XV
- Fabio Fazio, television presenter
- Kostas Georgakis, anti-fascist dissident who set himself ablaze as a protest against the Greek military junta of 1967–1974
- Serena Ivaldi, Italian roboticist
- Alberto Izzotti, researcher and academic
- Franco Malerba, first Italian astronaut
- Vittorio Maragliano, pioneering radiologist
- Giuseppe Mazzini
- Sandro Pertini, antifascist dissident, later 7th President of the Italian Republic
- Enrico Piaggio, industrialist
- Tomaso Poggio, Eugene McDermott professor at MIT
- Alessandro Riberi, noted physician and surgeon
- Federico Sesti, Italian neuroscientist
- Paolo Ardoino, CEO of Tether

== Collaborations ==
The University of Genoa has a strong collaboration with the Italian Institute of Technology (IIT), since its foundation in 2005.

== See also ==
- List of Italian universities
- List of Jesuit sites
- List of medieval universities
