= Alberto Izzotti =

Italian medical researcher

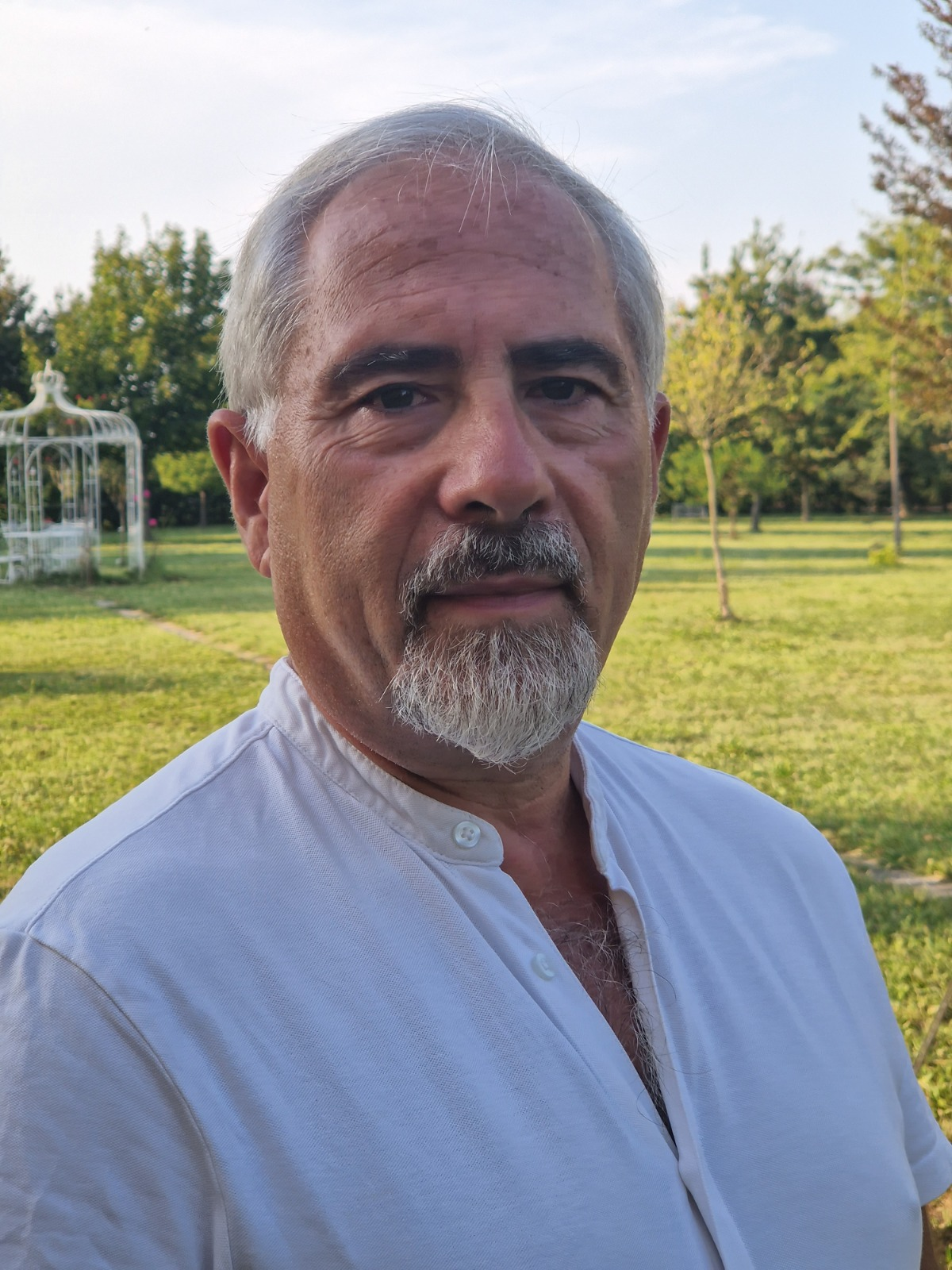
- Occupations: Medical doctor, researcher, and academic

Academic background
- Education: MD., Medicine and Surgery; MD Specialty., Hygiene and Preventive Medicine; Ph.D., Environmental and Food Toxicology; Master in Management
- Alma mater: University of Genoa; University of Camerino

Alberto Izzotti is a medical doctor, researcher, and academic. He is a professor and director of the PhD School in Health Sciences and Cancer Prevention at the University of Genoa, Italy.

Izzotti's research spans across molecular medicine, chronic degenerative diseases, the development of drugs for cancer prevention, human biomonitoring, and microarray analysis. He is the editor-in-chief of MicroRNA.

== Education ==
Izzotti graduated from the University of Genoa in 1987 with an MD in Medicine and Surgery. He then completed an MD specialist degree in Hygiene and Preventive Medicine from the same institute in 1991. In 1995 they received a Young Scientist Award from the European Environmental Mutagen Society.

In 1996 he earned a Ph.D. in Environmental and Food Toxicology from the University of Camerino. Moreover, in 2015, he received a master's degree in Management for Executives of Complex Structures of the National Health System from the University of Genoa.

== Career ==
Izzotti began his academic career in 1996 by joining the University of Genoa as an assistant professor and was then promoted to the rank of associate professor there in 2000. Since 2006, he has been appointed as a full professor there.

Izzotti was named director of the Research Unit of Mutagenesis and Cancer Prevention at the National Cancer Institute in San Martino Hospital in 2013. He is the director of the Ph.D. School of Health Sciences and Cancer Prevention at the University of Genoa since 2019. He is also the editor-in-chief of the medical journal MicroRNA.

== Research ==
In his research related to chemoprevention and cancer, Izzotti studied the effectiveness of chemopreventive drugs in preventing cancer and other mutation-related diseases. He studied the mechanisms through which these drugs work, particularly in relation to smoking-related outcomes. He showed that these medicines can reduce DNA damage and other cancer related effects in preclinical models.

Izzotti also investigated how microRNA (miRNA), which are small molecules that regulate gene expression, respond to noxious agents in healthy tissues. His studies demonstrated that miRNA impairment in lungs is induced by exposure to cigarette smoke. He also found that miRNA alterations occur as an early response in the tissue of cells exposed to environmental carcinogens before the onset of cancer. In related research, he also deduced the presence of extra-cellular miRNAs in biological fluids in order to determine their feasibility as potential cancer markers that can be detected through non-invasive procedures. It was then found that some panels of miRNAs can emerge as cancer biomarkers, but there is a need to identify more specific and reliable miRNA panels. In related work, Izzotti also explored the use of oral ozonized oils as a complementary therapy alongside conventional cancer treatments.

Beyond cancer, Izzotti investigated the causes of the molecular mechanisms responsible for the development of glaucoma, a leading cause of irreversible blindness. He found significantly higher levels of 8-hydroxy-2′-deoxyguanosine (8-OH-dG) in the trabecular meshwork of eyes of glaucoma patients. In similar research, he examined the levels of 8-OH-dG in relation to intraocular pressure, visual field damage, and disease duration. The results of this study found the presence of oxidative damage alongside neuronal cell death in optic nerves among patients with primary open-angle glaucoma (POAG), which supported the possible pathogenetic role of this phenomenon. Correspondingly, he also analyzed the role of mitochondrial damage in the eye of POAG patients and found that mitochondrial DNA deletion was significantly increased in the human trabecular meshwork within POAG patients.

== Selected articles ==
- Izzotti, Alberto; Saccà, Sergio C; Cartiglia, Cristina; De Flora, Silvio (2003). "Oxidative deoxyribonucleic acid damage in the eyes of glaucoma patients". The American Journal of Medicine. 114 (8): 638–646. doi:10.1016/S0002-9343(03)00114-1. ISSN 0002-9343. PMID 12798451.
- Saccà, Sergio Claudio; Pascotto, Antonio; Camicione, Paola; Capris, Paolo; Izzotti, Alberto (2005). "Oxidative DNA Damage in the Human Trabecular Meshwork: Clinical Correlation in Patients with Primary Open-Angle Glaucoma". Archives of Ophthalmology. 123 (4): 458–463. doi:10.1001/archopht.123.4.458. ISSN 0003-9950. PMID 15824217.
- Izzotti, Alberto; Bagnis, Alessandro; Saccà, Sergio C. (2006). "The role of oxidative stress in glaucoma". Mutation Research/Reviews in Mutation Research. 612 (2): 105–114. Bibcode:2006MRRMR.612..105I. doi:10.1016/j.mrrev.2005.11.001. ISSN 1383-5742. PMID 16413223.
- Izzotti, Alberto; Calin, George A.; Arrigo, Patrizio; Steele, Vernon E.; Croce, Carlo M.; De Flora, Silvio (2009). "Downregulation of microRNA expression in the lungs of rats exposed to cigarette smoke". The FASEB Journal. 23 (3): 806–812. doi:10.1096/fj.08-121384. ISSN 1530-6860. PMC 2653990. PMID 18952709.
- Izzotti, Alberto (2012). "Molecular medicine and the development of cancer chemopreventive agents". Annals of the New York Academy of Sciences. 1259 (1): 26–32. Bibcode:2012NYASA1259...26I. doi:10.1111/j.1749-6632.2012.06646.x. ISSN 1749-6632. PMID 22758633.
- Izzotti, Alberto; Fracchia, Enzo; Rosano, Camillo; Comite, Antonio; Belgioia, Liliana; Sciacca, Salvatore; Khalid, Zumama; Congiu, Matteo; Colarossi, Cristina; Blanco, Giusi; Santoro, Antonio; Chiara, Massimo; Pulliero, Alessandra (2022). "Efficacy of High-Ozonide Oil in Prevention of Cancer Relapses Mechanisms and Clinical Evidence". Cancers. 14 (5): 1174. doi:10.3390/cancers14051174. ISSN 2072-6694. PMC 8909345. PMID 35267482.
