= Federico Sesti =

Italian–American neuroscientist

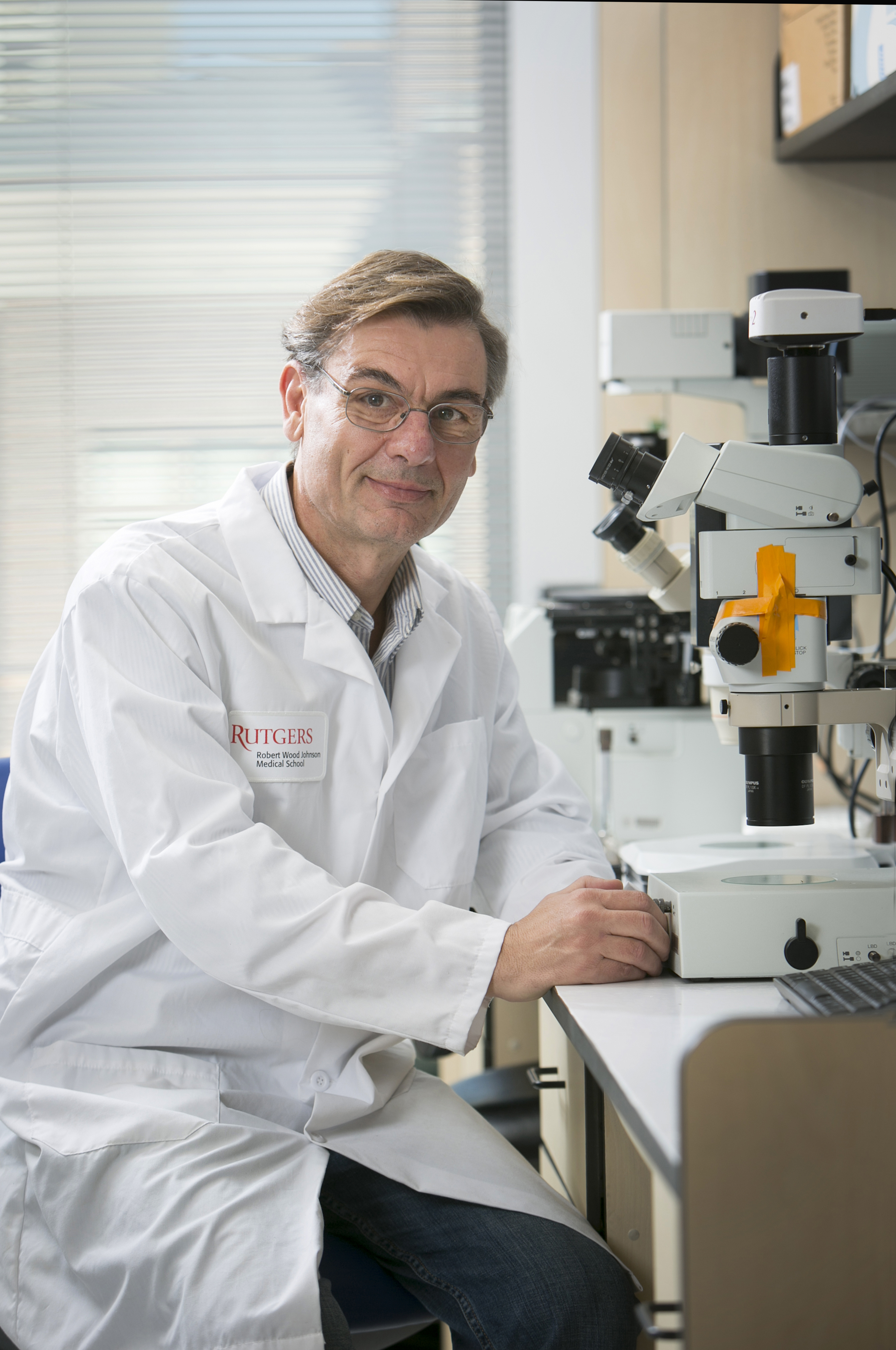
- Born: Italy
- Education: University of Genoa
- Occupations: Academic; Neuroscientist

Federico Sesti is an Italian-born neuroscientist and academic at the Robert Wood Johnson Medical School of Rutgers University.

== Biography ==
Sesti obtained his Laurea and Ph.D. in physics from the University of Genoa. Following this, he conducted postdoctoral research at the Institut für Biologische Informationsverarbeitung, Forschungszentrum Jülich in Germany under Benjamin Kaupp and at Yale University in the USA under Steve Goldstein. He joined the faculty of the Robert Wood Johnson Medical School in 2001.

Sesti has been recognized as a Fulbright Scholar and is a member of various scientific societies. Additionally, Sesti serves on the editorial boards of several journals and serves on panels of several international, federal, and private funding agencies.

== Research ==
His research topics include ion channels, potassium channels, aging, oxidative stress, reactive oxygen species (ROS), Srctyrosine kinases, C. Elegans, and cell signaling.

Sesti's laboratory has conducted research on the non-conducting functions of ion channels, focusing on the molecular mechanisms of neuronal aging in vertebrates and invertebrates. Specifically, the lab has studied how excess oxidants affect K+ channels and the role this plays in the decline of neuronal function during aging and in neurodegenerative diseases.

== Selected publications ==
- Bortolami et al. "Integrin-KCNB1 potassium channel complexes regulate neocortical neuronal development and are implicated in epilepsy" Cell Death & Differentiation. doi:10.1038/s41418-022-01072-2.
- Bortolami et al. "Abnormal cytoskeletal remodeling but normal neuronal excitability in a mouse model of the recurrent developmental and epileptic encephalopathy-susceptibility KCNB1-p.R312H variant" Communications Biology. doi:10.1038/s42003-024-07344-6.
- Vitali et al. "Apoptotic cell death in disease--current understanding of the NCCD 2023" Cell Death & Differentiation. doi:10.1038/s41418-023-01153-w.
- Forzisi et al. "Antagonistic roles of Ras-MAPK and Akt signaling in Integrin-K+ channel Complexes-mediated cellular apoptosis" The FASEB Journal. doi:10.1096/fj.202200180R
- Wei Y. et al. "Oxidation of KCNB1 channels in the human brain and in mouse model of Alzheimer's disease". Cell Death & Differentiation. doi:10.1038/s41419-018-0886-1
- Sesti F. Oxidation of Ion Channels in the Aging Process. ISBN 9781138196971
- Sesti F. "Oxidation of K+ channels in aging and neurodegeneration". Aging and Disease. doi:10.14336/AD.2015.0901.
- Cotella D. et al. "Toxic role of K+ channel oxidation in mammalian brain". The Journal of Neuroscience, doi:10.1523/JNEUROSCI.6153-11.2012.
- Sesti F. et al. "Oxidation of K+ channels by ROS: a general mechanism of aging and neurodegeneration?". Trends in Cell Biology, doi:10.1016/j.tcb.2009.09.008
- Cai S. and F. Sesti. "Oxidation of a potassium channel causes progressive sensory function loss during aging". Nature Neuroscience. doi:10.1038/nn.2291
- Park K. and F. Sesti (2007). "An arrhythmia susceptibility gene in Caenorhabditis elegans" Journal of Biological Chemistry. doi:10.1074/jbc.M701625200.
- Cai S. et al. "MPS-1 is a K+ channel β-subunit and a serine/threonine kinase". Nature Neuroscience. doi:10.1038/nn1557
- Park K., et al. "Single-walled carbon nanotubes: A new class of ion-channel blockers". Journal of Biological Chemistry. Dec 12;278(50):50212-6 doi:10.1074/jbc.M310216200
- Sesti F. et al. "A common polymorphism associated with cardiac arrhythmia increases sensitivity to a common antibiotic". Proceedings of the National Academy of Sciences of the United States of America, doi:10.1073/pnas.180223197
- Abbot G.W. et al. "MiRP1 forms Ikr potassium channels with HERG and is associated with cardiac arrhythmia". Cell, doi:10.1016/s0092-8674(00)80728-x
- Sesti F. and S.A.N. Goldstein "Single-channel characteristics of wildtype Iks channels and channels formed with two MinK mutants that cause long QT syndrome". The Journal of General Physiology, doi:10.1085/jgp.112.6.651.
