= Via Cairoli =

Street in Genoa, Italy

- Strada Nuovissima
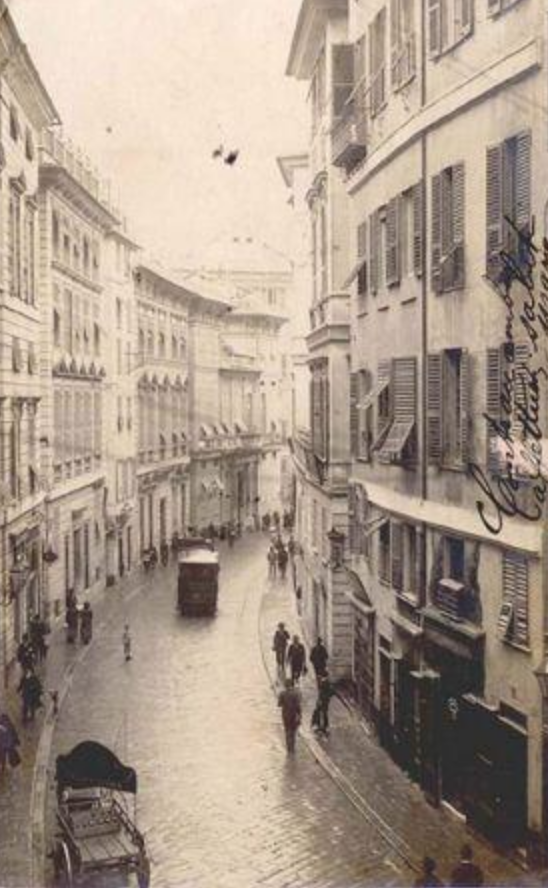
- Via Cairoli, Genova
- Interactive map of Via Cairoli
- 44.4119886°N 8.9307744°E
- Location: Genoa
- Region: Liguria

UNESCO World Heritage Site
- Official name: Genoa: The Strade Nuove and the system of the Palazzi dei Rolli
- Type: Cultural
- Criteria: (ii)(iv)
- Designated: 2006
- Reference no.: 1211
- Region: Italy

Via Cairoli is a street in the historical centre of Genoa, in North-western Italy, named after the 10th Prime Minister of Italy Benedetto Cairoli (1825-1889). Built in the 18th century as “Strada Nuovissima” (Italian for “the most new street”), it is one of the Strade Nuove (Italian for "new streets") inscribed in July 2006 in the list of UNESCO World Heritage Site Genoa: the Strade Nuove and the system of the Palazzi dei Rolli.

== History ==
Via Cairoli, then known as Strada Nuovissima, was built between 1778 and 1786 by the architect Gregorio Petondi.

During the Reinassance period, the nobility of the Republic of Genoa started a careful town planning to transform the existing medieval city and initiate a sizeable urban expansion to the North. After this expansion, however, the two “Strade Nuove” - the 16th-century Strada Nuova (now via Garibaldi) and the 17th-century Strada Balbi (now via Balbi) – remained without a comparable thoroughfare connecting them, separated by a number of medieval alleys and squares. In the 18th century, therefore, the city decided to improve the connection between the two monumental streets and give a boost to the westward traffic through the construction of Strada Nuovissima. This required sacrificing some ancient working-class homes and adapting some of the aristocratic palaces, such as the Palazzo Lomellini Doria-Lamba, which were located alongside the new street.

== Palaces listed as a UNESCO World Heritage Site ==
20	Gerolamo Grimaldi	Salita San Francesco, 4, Genoa	Palazzo della Meridiana
21	Gio Carlo Brignole	Piazza della Meridiana, 2, Genoa	Palazzo Durazzo Brignole
23	Stefano Lomellini	Via Cairoli, 18, Genoa	Palazzo Lomellini Doria Lamba

== See also ==
- Genoa: The Strade Nuove and the system of the Palazzi dei Rolli
- Via Garibaldi (Genoa)
- Via Balbi (Genoa)
- Republic of Genoa
- Genoa

== Bibliography ==
- “Le Strade Nuove”, Genova, SAGEP Editrice, 1986.
- Giorgio Doria (1995), Nobiltà e investimenti a Genova in Età moderna, Genova
- Gioconda Pomella (2007), Guida Completa ai Palazzi dei Rolli Genova, Genova, De Ferrari Editore(ISBN 9788871728155)
- Mauro Quercioli (2008), I Palazzi dei Rolli di Genova, Roma, Libreria dello Stato (ISBN 9788824011433)
- Fiorella Caraceni Poleggi (2001), Palazzi Antichi e Moderni di Genova raccolti e disegnati da Pietro Paolo Rubens (1652), Genova, Tormena Editore (ISBN 9788884801302)
- Mario Labò (2003), I palazzi di Genova di P.P. Rubens, Genova, Nuova Editrice Genovese
