= Vittorio Maragliano =

Italian pioneer of nineteenth century radiology

- Born: 1878
- Died: 1944 (aged 65–66)
- Medical career
- Sub-specialties: Radiology

Vittorio Maragliano (1878–1944) was an Italian pioneer of nineteenth century radiology. Born in Genoa, he was the son of Edoardo Maragliano, physician and professor of internal medicine at the University of Genoa. Vittorio Maragliano graduated from the University of Genoa in 1901.
