= Via Balbi (Genoa) =

Street in Genoa, Italy

- Strada Balbi
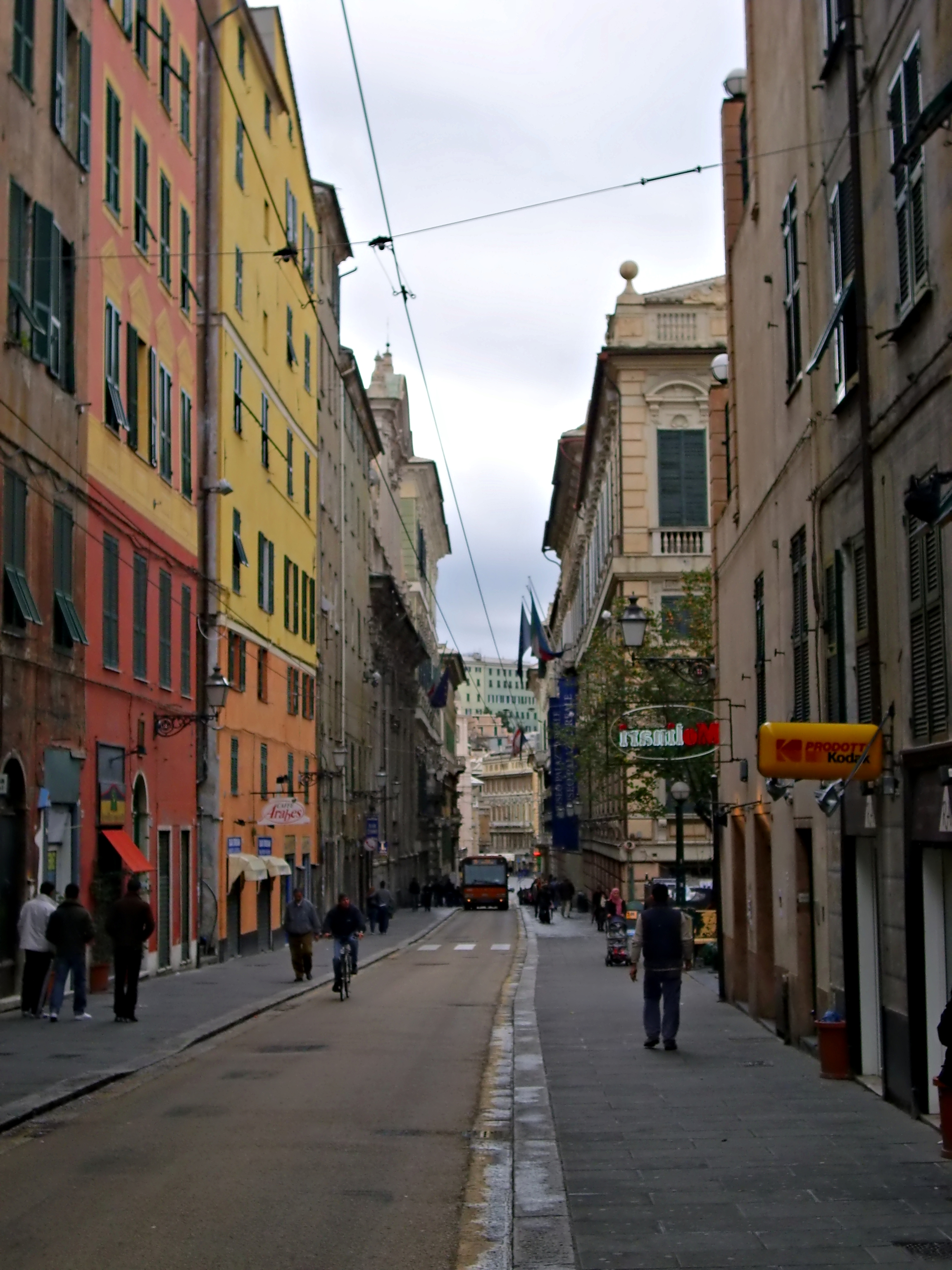
- Via Balbi
- Interactive map of Via Balbi
- 44.415017°N 8.926264°E
- Location: Genoa
- Region: Liguria

UNESCO World Heritage Site
- Official name: Genoa: The Strade Nuove and the system of the Palazzi dei Rolli
- Type: Cultural
- Criteria: (ii)(iv)
- Designated: 2006
- Reference no.: 1211
- Region: Italy

Via Balbi is a street in the historical centre of Genoa, in Northwestern Italy, named after the aristocratic Genoese Balbi family. It is one of the Strade Nuove (Italian for "new streets") built by the Genoese aristocracy during the Renaissance. Since July 2006 it is inscribed in the list of UNESCO World Heritage Site Genoa: the Strade Nuove and the system of the Palazzi dei Rolli.

== History ==
Formerly known as Strada Balbi, the street was built between 1602 and 1620 as a cooperation between the city authorities and the Balbi family to improve the connection between the city center and the area around the harbor.

Between the first half of the 16th century and the first half of the 17th century, the nobility of the Republic of Genoa started a careful town planning to transform the existing medieval city and initiate a sizeable urban expansion to the North. The move to expand the antique palaces and to build new sumptuous ones was driven by the extraordinary wealth that came into the city through prosperous financing activities towards several European powers. In particular, the Genoese aristocracy financed the expensive undertakings of the Spanish Crown, such as the mercenary army that Spain kept in Flanders from 1566 to the peace of Westphalia in 1648. The ruling class of Genoa, mixing nobility of blood with new mercantile wealth, sought to underpin their prestige by the construction of grand city palaces and suburban villas of unusual splendor.

The first stretch of the street includes seven palaces, all formerly owned by the Balbi family, the former Collegium of the Jesuits (now the main seat of the University of Genoa) with the church of San Girolamo e Francesco Saverio and the Carmelite church of San Vittore e Carlo. The final stretch, which used to count eight 17th century monasteries, was modified in the 19th century, when the nearby train station of Genova Principe was built.

== Palaces listed as a UNESCO World Heritage Site ==
No. on the UNESCO list	Original Owner	Location	Current name of the Palace	Photo
26	Gio. Agostino Balbi	Via Balbi, 1, Genoa	Palazzo Durazzo Pallavicini	
27	Gio Francesco Balbi	Via Balbi, 2, Genoa	Palazzo Balbi Cattaneo	
28	Giacomo and Pantaleo Balbi	Via Balbi, 4, Genoa	Palazzo Balbi Senarega	
29	Francesco Balbi Piovera	Via Balbi, 6, Genoa	Palazzo Balbi Piovera Raggio	
30	Stefano Balbi	Via Balbi, 10, Genoa	Royal Palace of Genoa	

== Quotes ==
- Stendhal, describes via Balbi and Le Strade Nuove as the most beautiful in Italy

Taking a letter to Mrs Mojon, in Strada Balbi; this is one of the three names of one long street, which is also the most beautiful in Italy

— Stendhal, Journal d'un voyage en Italie et in Suisse pendant l'annee 1828

- Charles Dickens gave a suggestive description of Strada Balbi in his travelogue Pictures from Italy.

...When shall I forget the Streets of Palaces: the Strada Nuova and the Strada Balbi!

— Charles Dickens, Pictures from Italy

== Gallery ==
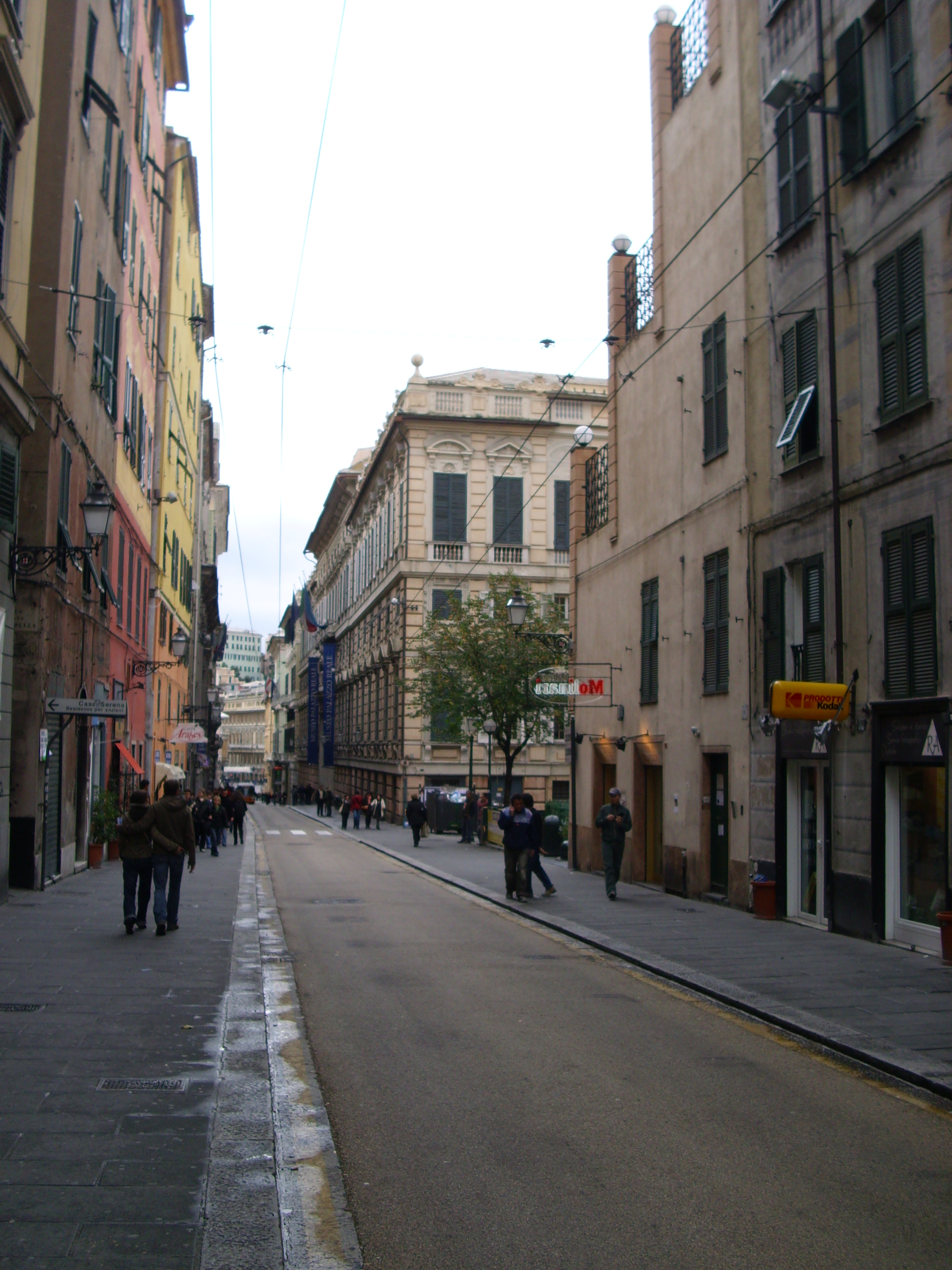

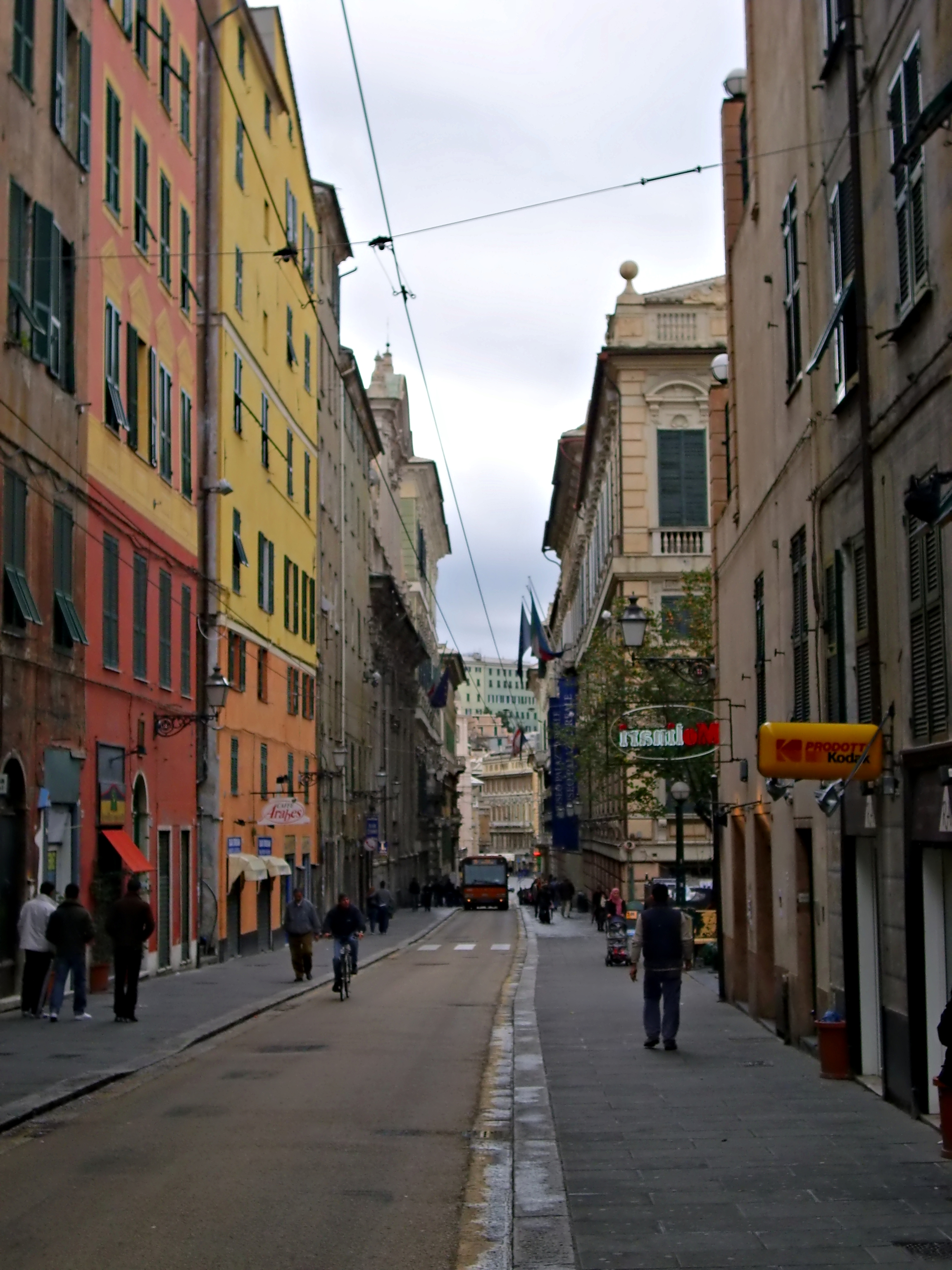

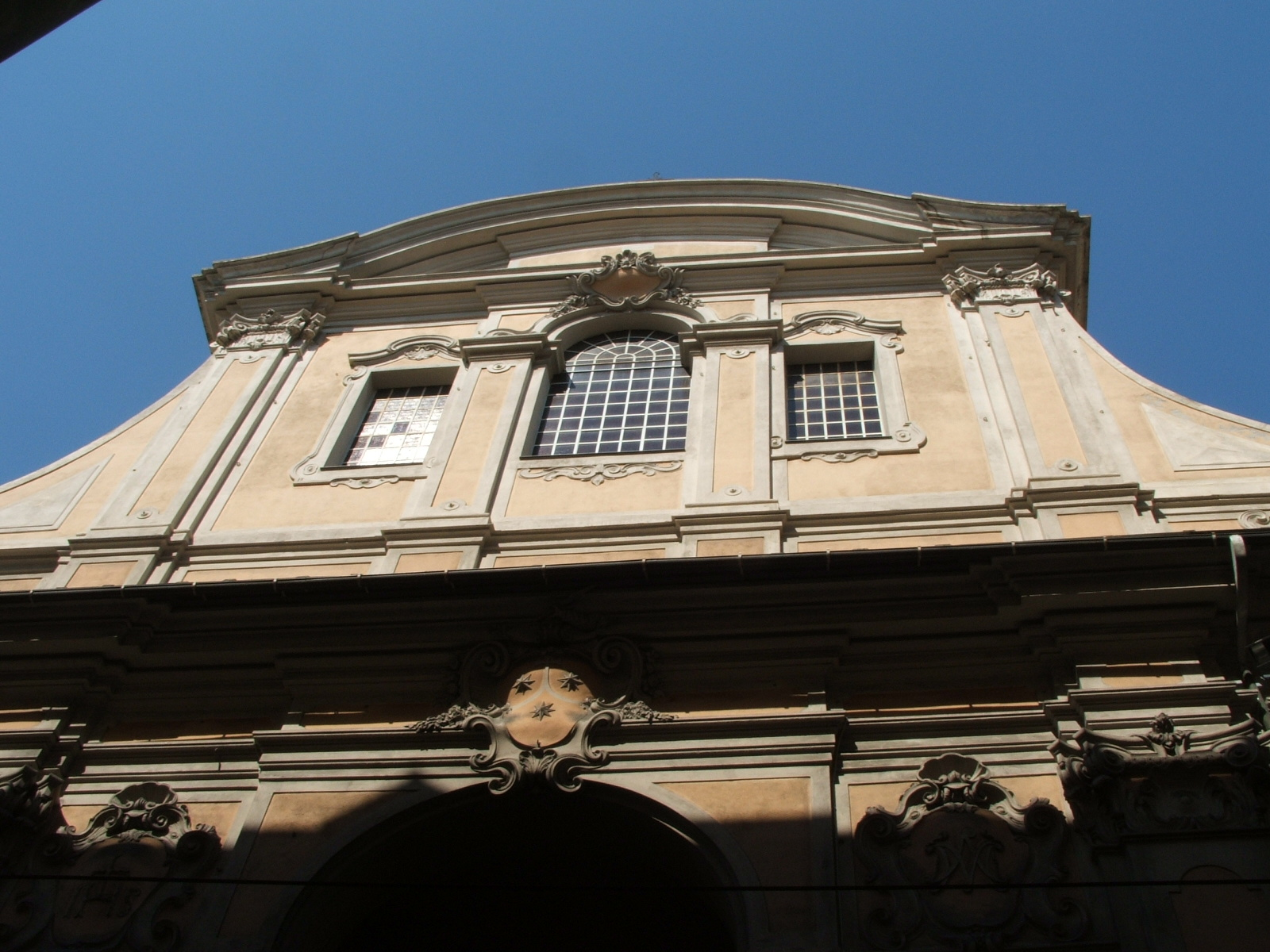

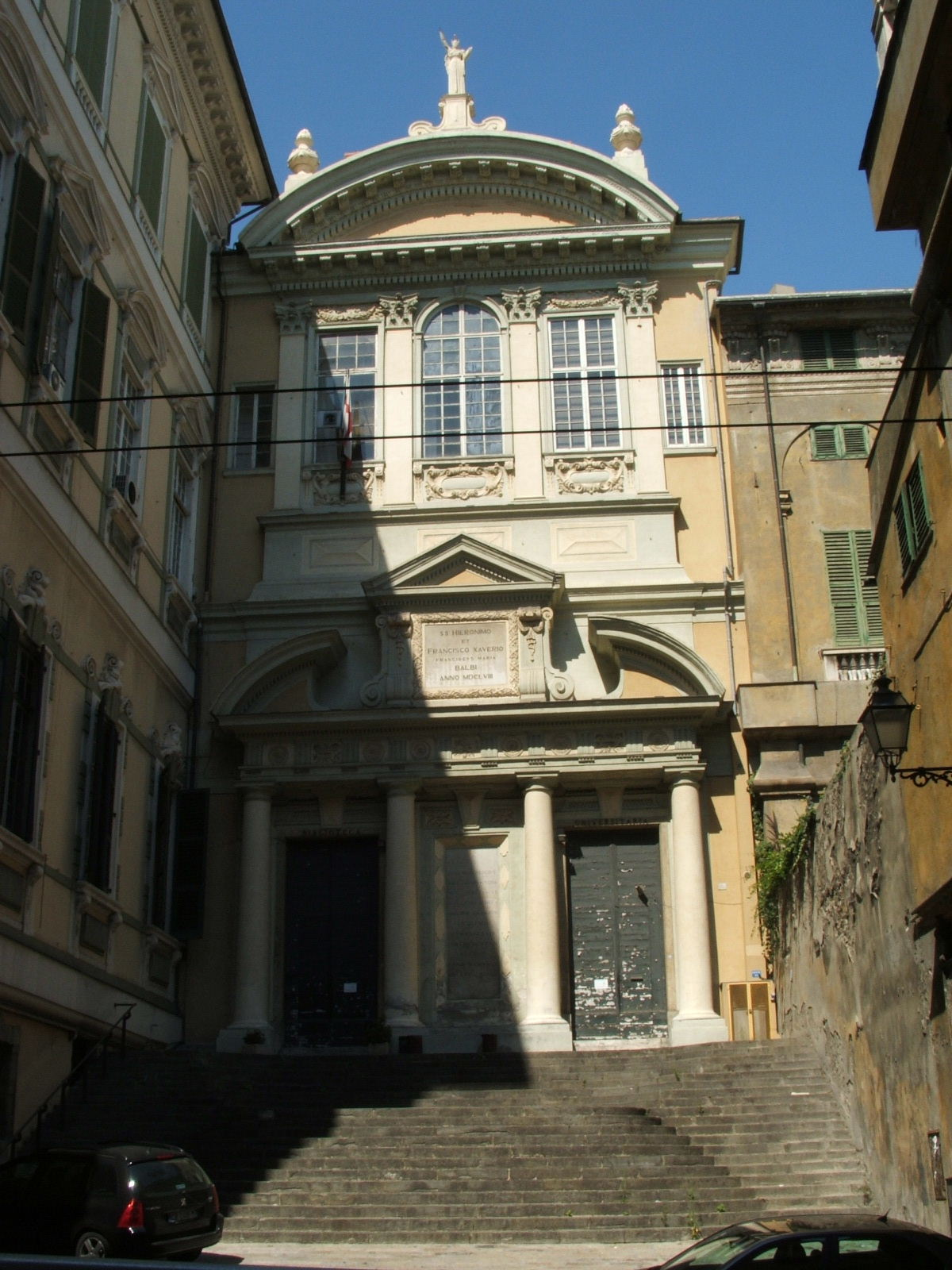

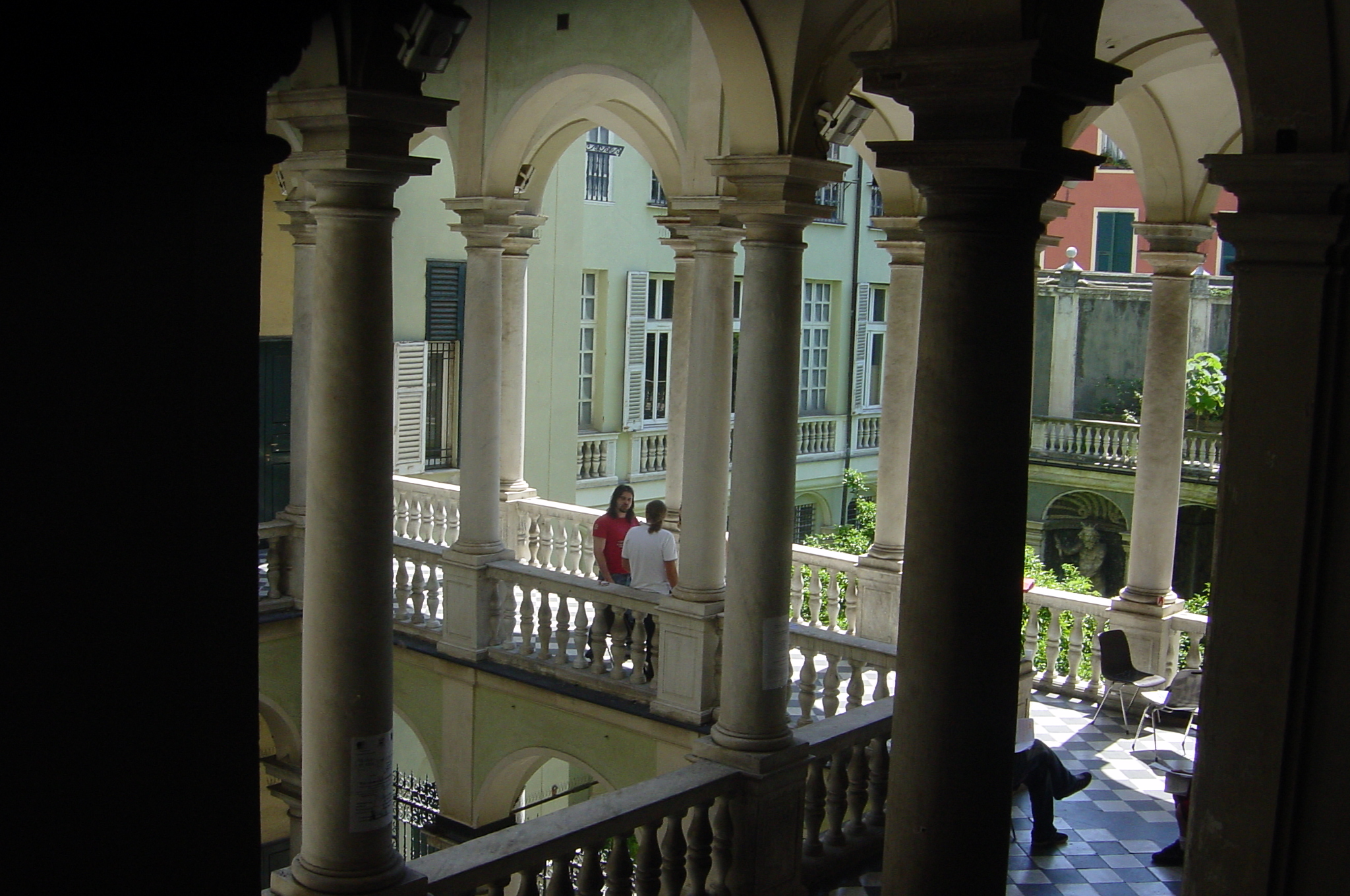

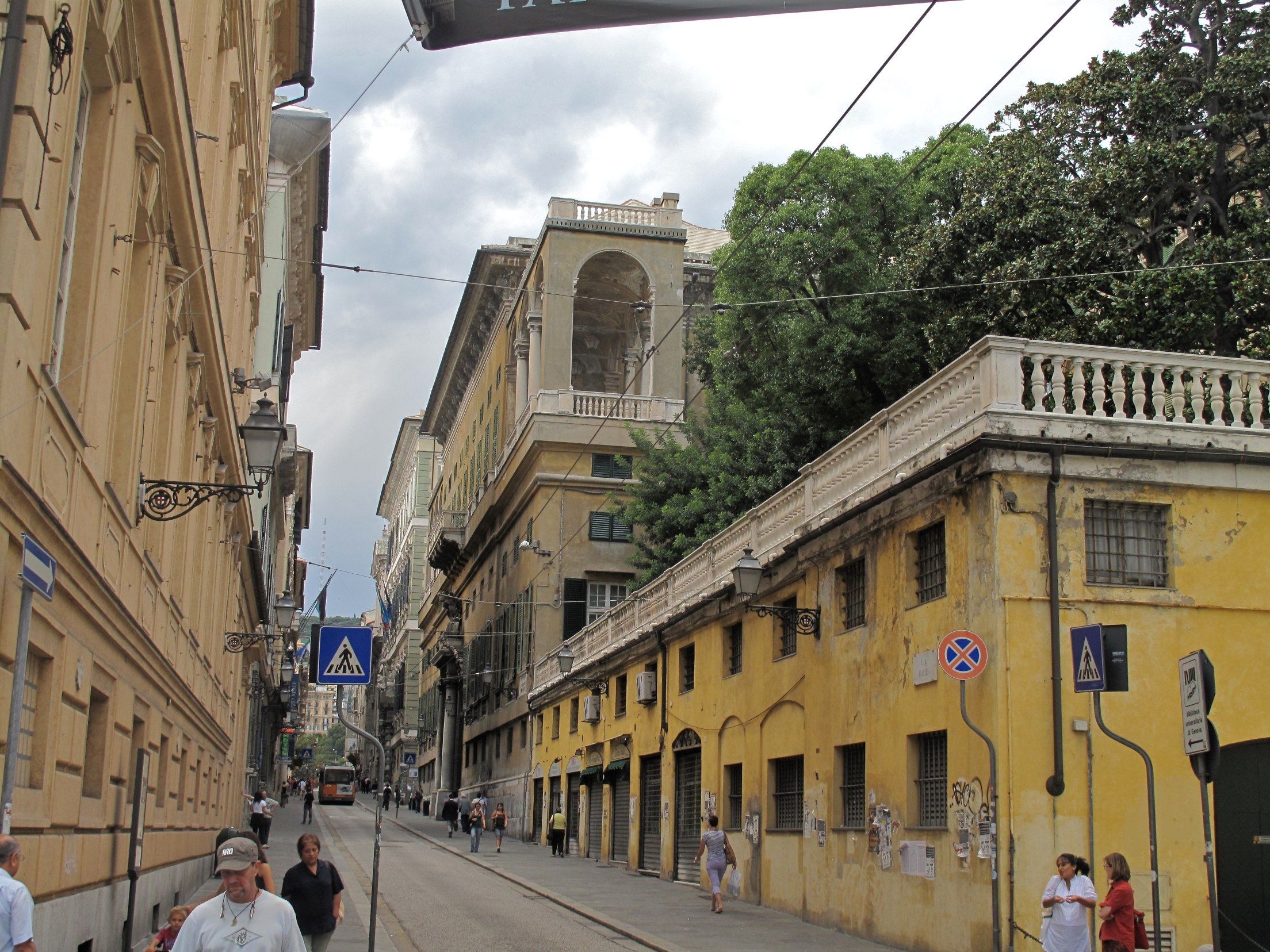

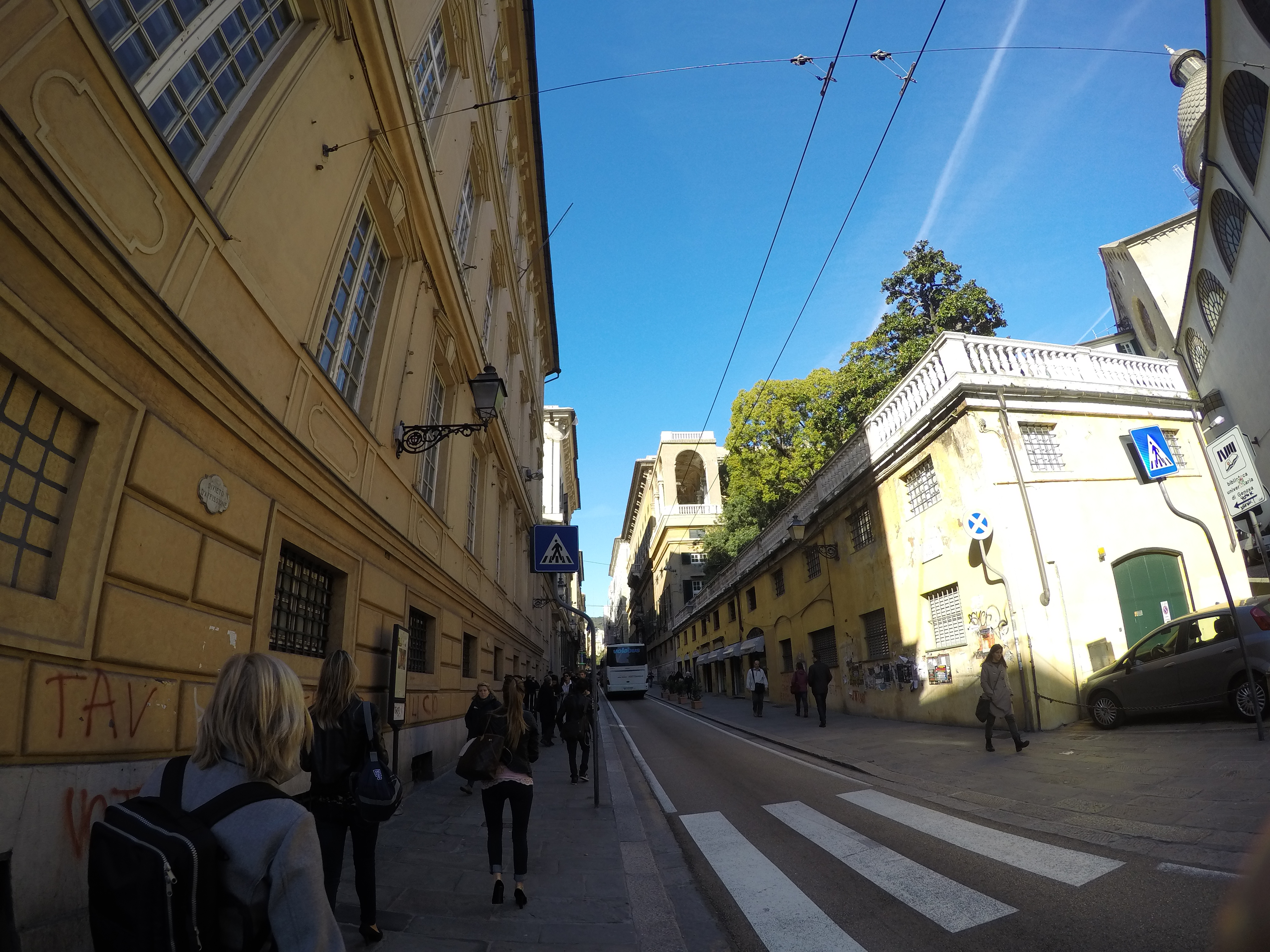

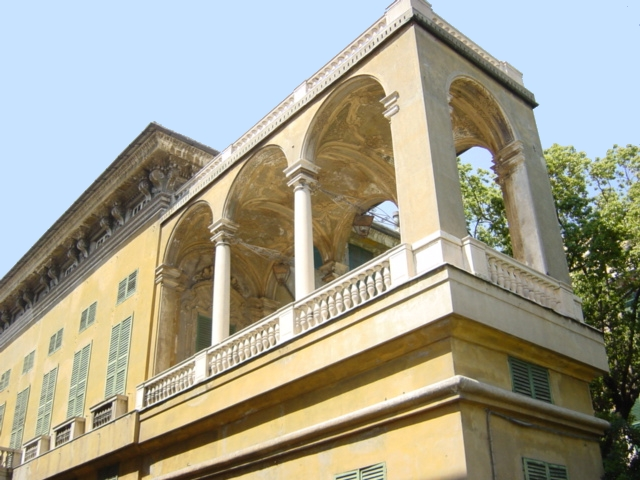

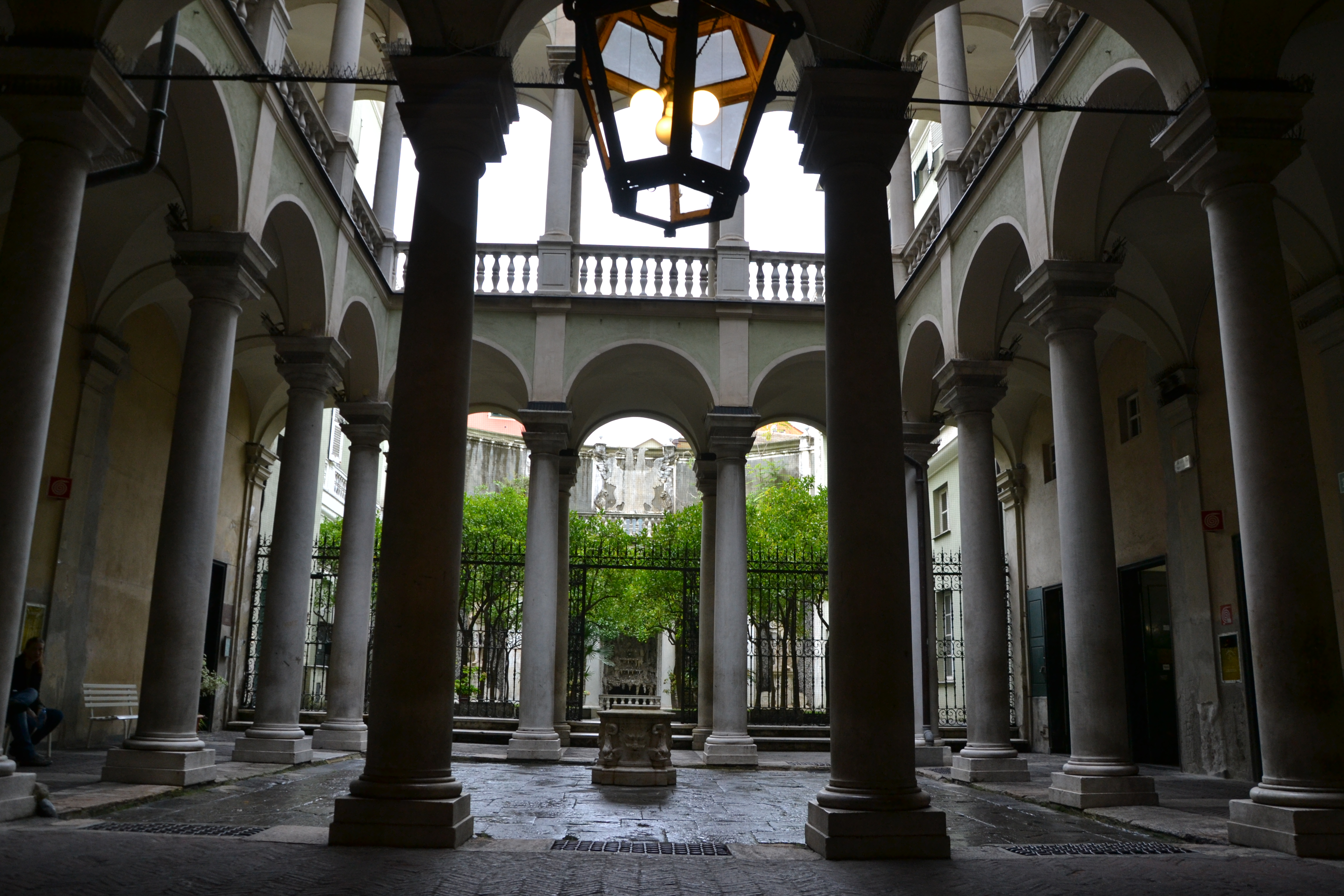

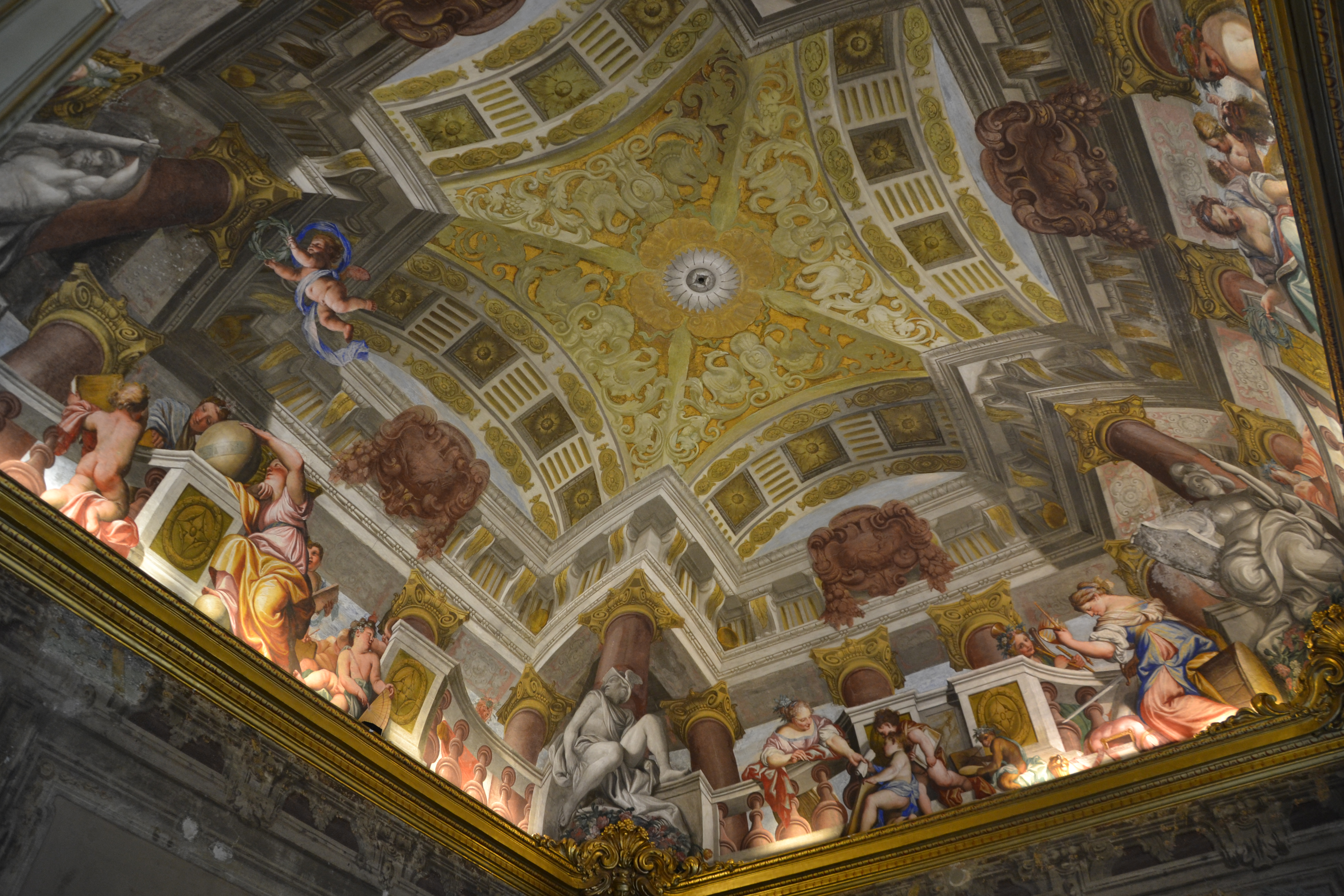

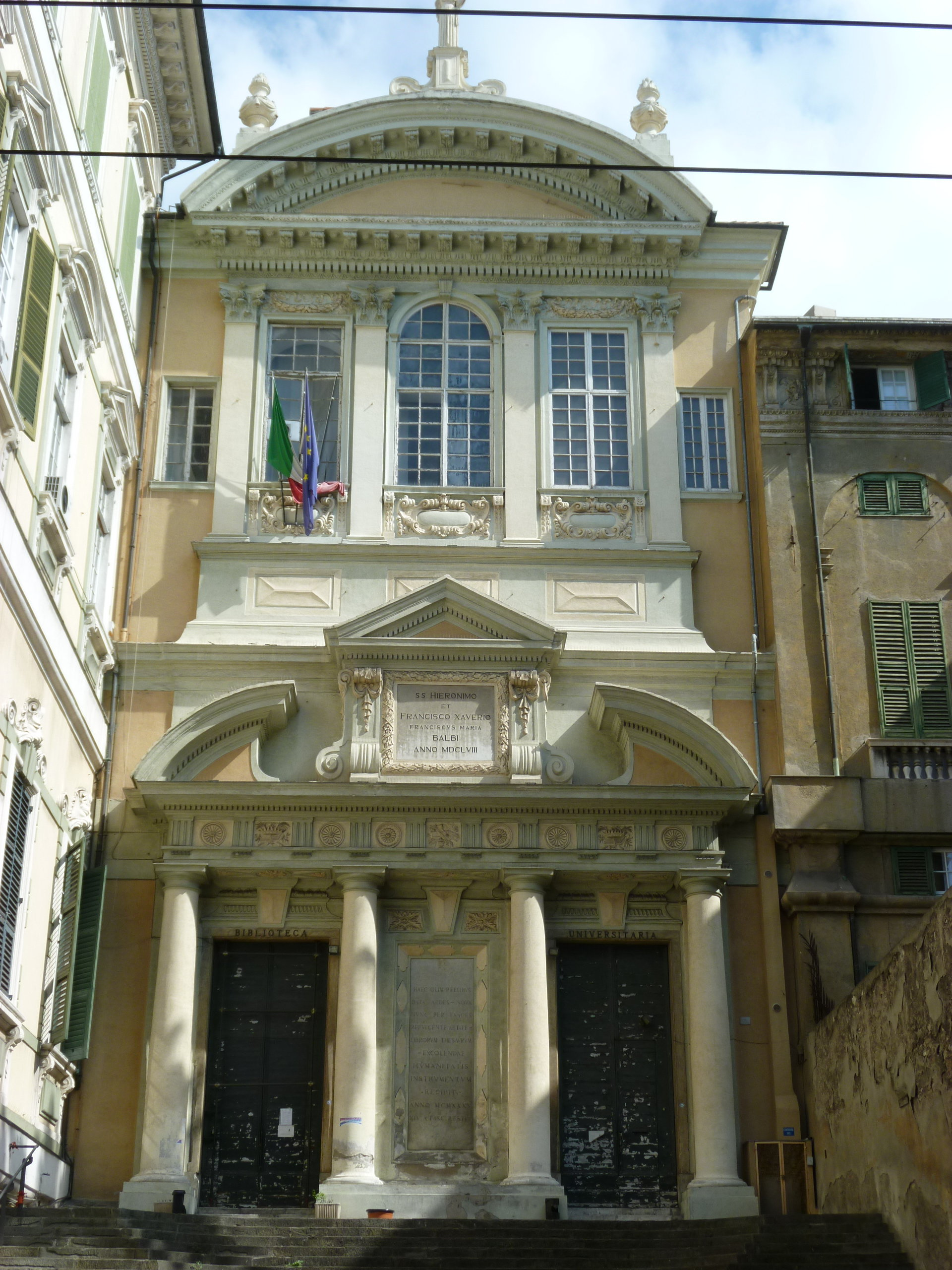

== See also ==
- Genoa: The Strade Nuove and the system of the Palazzi dei Rolli
- Via Giuseppe Garibaldi (Genoa)
- Via Cairoli (Genoa)
- Republic of Genoa
- Genoa

== Bibliography ==
- Giorgio Doria (1995), Nobiltà e investimenti a Genova in Età moderna, Genova
- Gioconda Pomella (2007), Guida Completa ai Palazzi dei Rolli Genova, Genova, De Ferrari Editore(ISBN 9788871728155)
- Mauro Quercioli (2008), I Palazzi dei Rolli di Genova, Roma, Libreria dello Stato (ISBN 9788824011433)
- Fiorella Caraceni Poleggi (2001), Palazzi Antichi e Moderni di Genova raccolti e disegnati da Pietro Paolo Rubens (1652), Genova, Tormena Editore (ISBN 9788884801302)
- Mario Labò (2003), I palazzi di Genova di P.P. Rubens, Genova, Nuova Editrice Genovese
