= Aging and Disease =

- Discipline: Gerontology
- Language: English
- Edited by: Kunlin Jin, Ashok Shetty, David Greenberg

Publication details
- History: 2010–present
- Publisher: JKL International on behalf of the International Society on Aging and Disease
- Frequency: Bimonthly
- Open access: Yes
- Impact factor: 9.968 (2021)

Standard abbreviations
- ISO 4: Aging Dis.

Indexing
- ISSN: 2152-5250
- LCCN: 2009203531
- OCLC no.: 488681823

Links
- Journal homepage; Online access; Online archive

Aging and Disease is a bimonthly peer-reviewed open access medical journal published by JKL International on behalf of the International Society on Aging and Disease. It covers all issues pertaining to the biology of aging, pathophysiology of age-related diseases, and novel treatments for diseases affecting the elderly. The journal was established in 2010 and the editors-in-chief are Kunlin Jin (University of North Texas), Ashok K. Shetty (Texas A&M Health Science Center College of Medicine), and David Greenberg (Buck Institute for Research on Aging). The impact factor of the journal in 2021 is 9.968.

== Abstracting and indexing ==
The journal is abstracted and indexed in: PubMed Central, Science Citation Index Expanded, and BIOSIS Previews.
