= Neuronal cell cycle =

The Neuronal cell cycle represents the life cycle of the biological cell, its creation, reproduction and eventual death. The process by which cells divide into two daughter cells is called mitosis. Once these cells are formed they enter G1, the phase in which many of the proteins needed to replicate DNA are made. After G1, the cells enter S phase during which the DNA is replicated. After S, the cell will enter G2 where the proteins required for mitosis to occur are synthesized. Unlike most cell types however, neurons are generally considered incapable of proliferating once they are differentiated, as they are in the adult nervous system. Nevertheless, it remains plausible that neurons may re-enter the cell cycle under certain circumstances. Sympathetic and cortical neurons, for example, try to reactivate the cell cycle when subjected to acute insults such as DNA damage, oxidative stress, and excitotoxicity. This process is referred to as “abortive cell cycle re-entry” because the cells usually die in the G1/S checkpoint before DNA has been replicated.

== Cell cycle regulation ==
Transitions through the cell cycle from one phase to the next are regulated by cyclins binding their respective cyclin dependent kinases (Cdks) which then activate the kinases (Fisher, 2012). During G1, cyclin D is synthesized and binds to Cdk4/6, which in turn phosphorylates retinoblastoma (Rb) protein and induces the release of the transcription factor E2F1 which is necessary for DNA replication (Liu et al., 1998). The G1/S transition is regulated by cyclin E binding to Cdk2 which phosphorylates Rb as well (Merrick and Fisher, 2011). S phase is then driven by the binding of cyclin A with Cdk2. In late S phase, cyclin A binds with Cdk1 to promote late replication origins and also initiates the condensation of the chromatin in the late G2 phase. The G2/M phase transition is regulated by the formation of the Cdk1/cyclin B complex.

Inhibition through the cell cycle is maintained by cyclin-dependent kinase inhibitors (CKIs) of the Ink and Cip/Kip families which inhibit the cyclin/CDK complex. CDK4/6 is inhibited by p15Ink4b, p16Ink4a, p18Ink4c, and p19Ink4d. These inhibitors prevent the binding of CDK4/6 with cyclin D (Cánepa et al., 2007). The Cip/Kip families (p21Cip1, p27^{Kip1}, and p57Kip2) also bind to cyclin/CDK complexes and prohibit advancement through the cell cycle. The cell cycle uses these CDKs and CKIs to regulate the cell cycle through checkpoints. These checkpoints ensure that the cell has completed all of the tasks of the current phase before they can gain entry into the next phase of the cycle. The criteria for the checkpoints are met through a combination of activating and inhibiting cyclin/CDK complexes as the result of different signaling pathways (Besson et al., 2008; Cánepa et al., 2007; Yasutis and Kozminski, 2013). If the criteria are not met, the cell will arrest in the phase prior to the checkpoint until the criteria are met. Progression through a checkpoint without having first met the appropriate criteria can lead to cell death (Fisher, 2012; Williams and Stoeber, 2012).

== Abortive cell cycle re-entry ==
It is believed that neurons are permanently blocked from the cell cycle once they differentiate. As a result, neurons are typically found outside of the cell cycle in a G0 state. It has been found that various genes that encode the G1/S transition, such as D1, Cdk4, Rb proteins, E2Fs, and CKIs, can be detected in different areas of a normal human brain (Frade and Ovejero-Benito, 2015). The presence of these core cell cycle factors can be explained through their role in neuronal migration, maturation, and synaptic plasticity (Christopher L. Frank1 and Li-Huei Tsai1, 2009). However, it is also possible that, under certain conditions, these factors can induce cell cycle re-entry. Under conditions such as DNA damage, oxidative stress, and activity withdrawal these factors have been shown to be upregulated. However the cells usually die in the G1/S checkpoint before DNA has been replicated (Park et al., 1998).

The process by which the cell re-enters the cell cycle and dies is called “abortive cell cycle re-entry” and is characterized by the upregulation of cyclin D-cdk4/6 and downregulation of E2F, followed by cell death (Frade and Ovejero-Benito, 2015). In cerebellar granule cells and cortical neurons, E2F1 can trigger neuronal apoptosis through activation of Bax/caspase-3 and the induction of the Cdk1/FOXO1/Bad pathway (Giovanni et al., 2000). The downregulation of p130/E2F4 (a complex which has been shown to maintain the post mitotic nature of neurons) induces neuronal apoptosis by upregulating B-myb and C-myb (Liu et al., 2005).

== Cell cycle re-entry ==
Tetraploid neurons (neurons with 4C DNA content) are not restricted to retinal neurons, 10% of human cortical neurons have DNA higher than 2C (Frade and Ovejero-Benito, 2015). Typically differentiated neurons that replicate their DNA die. However, this is not always the case as exhibited by sensory and sympathetic neurons, which are able to replicate their DNA without neuronal death (Smith et al., 2000). Neurons that are Rb deficient have also been found to re-enter the cell cycle and survive in a 4C DNA state (Lipinski et al., 2001). Duplication of DNA can lead to neuronal diversification in vertebrates, as seen in observations in the developing chick retina.

These neurons re-enter the cell cycle as they travel to the ganglion cell layer when they are activated by p75NTR. These neurons are unable to enter mitosis and are stuck in a 4C DNA content state. Cell cycle re-entry by p75NTR is not dependent on Cdk4/6 (Morillo et al., 2012) and, therefore, differs from other cell types that re-enter the cell cycle. In retinal ganglion cells, p75NTR is mediated by p38MAPK and then phosphorylates E2F4, before progressing the cell through the cell cycle. Tetraploid neurons in mice are made in a p75NTR dependent manner in cells that contain Rb during their migration to their differentiated neuronal layers (Morillo et al., 2012). It is still unknown why these neurons are able to pass through the G1/S checkpoint and not induce apoptosis through E2F1.

== Neurodegenerative diseases ==
Cell cycle re-entry usually causes apoptosis. However, in some neurodegenerative diseases, re-entry into the cell cycle occurs. The neurons that are able to re-enter the cell cycle are much more likely to undergo apoptosis and lead to the disease phenotypes. In Alzheimer’s disease, affected neurons show signs of DNA replication such as phosphorylated Mcm2 and cell cycle regulators cyclin D, Cdk4, phosphorylated Rb, E2F1, and cyclin E. Not much is currently known about the direct mechanism by which the cell cycle is reactivated, however it is possible that MiR26b may regulate the activation of cell cycle progression by upregulating cyclin E1 and downregulating p27Kip1 (Busser et al., 1998; Yang et al., 2003).

Alzheimer diseased neurons rarely exhibit the ability to enter mitosis and, if they don’t undergo rapid mitosis, can survive for long periods of time in a tetraploid state. These neurons are able to enter the S phase and replicate their DNA, however they become blocked in the G2 state.

In affected and unaffected tetraploid neurons, during development and during the progression of the disease, passing the G2/M checkpoint leads to cell death. This hints that the G2/M checkpoint aids in the survival of tetraploid neurons. This is supported by experiments in which the G2/M checkpoint is removed through addition of brain-derived neurotrophic factor (BDNF) blockers in tetraploid cells that resulted in cell death. BDNF prevents the G2/M transition through its receptor TrkB and their capacity to decrease cyclin B and Cdk1. The mechanism by which neurons undergo apoptosis after the G2/M transition is not yet fully understood, it is known that Cdk1 can activate the pro-apoptotic factor Bad by phosphorylating its Ser128 (Frade, 2000).

== Interkinetic nuclear migration ==
Interkinetic nuclear migration is a feature of developing neuroepithelia and is characterized by the periodic movement of the cell’s nucleus with the progression of the cell cycle. Developing neuroepithelia are tissues composed of neural progenitor cells, each spanning the entire thickness of the epithelium from the ventricular surface to the laminal side. Cell nuclei occupy different positions along the apical–basal axis of the tissue. S phase occurs close to the basal side whereas mitosis exclusively occurs close to ventricular apical side. The nuclei then move to upper regions near the basal side where they proceed through S-phase.

This nuclear movement is repeated at each cell cycle and is maintained by an apical-to-basal migration during G1- phase and a reverse basal-to-apical movement during G2- phase. It was proposed that the INM maximized the amount of mitotic events in the limited space and that, since neuronal progenitors have a basal body, they need to move their nucleus to the apical side in order to assemble the mitotic spindle used in mitosis. It has been reported that the INM is not required for the cell cycle since removing the INM doesn’t change the length of the cell cycle. Interestingly, blocking or delaying the cell cycle results in the arrest or reduction of the INM respectively. Nuclear migration is not necessary for cell cycle regulation, however cell cycle regulators have tight control over the INM (Del Bene, 2011).

== Bibliography ==
- Del Bene, F. (2011). Interkinetic nuclear migration: Cell cycle on the move. EMBO J. 30, 1676–1677.
- Besson, A., Dowdy, S.F., and Roberts, J.M. (2008). CDK Inhibitors: Cell Cycle Regulators and Beyond. Dev. Cell 14, 159–169.
- Busser, J., Geldmacher, D.S., Herrup, K., Hof, P.R., Duff, K., and Davies, P. (1998). Ectopic cell cycle proteins predict the sites of neuronal cell death in Alzheimer’s disease brain. J. Neurosci. 18, 2801–2807.
- Cánepa, E.T., Scassa, M.E., Ceruti, J.M., Marazita, M.C., Carcagno, A.L., Sirkin, P.F., and Ogara, M.F. (2007). INK4 proteins, a family of mammalian CDK inhibitors with novel biological functions. IUBMB Life 59, 419–426.
- Christopher L. Frank1 and Li-Huei Tsai1, 2 (2009). Alternative functions of core cell cycle regulators in neuronal migration, neuronal maturation, and synaptic plasticity. NIH Public Access 62, 312–326.
- Fisher, R.P. (2012). The CDK network: Linking cycles of cell sdivision and gene expression. Genes and Cancer 3, 731–738.
- Frade, J.M. (2000). Unscheduled re-entry into the cell cycle induced by NGF precedes cell death in nascent retinal neurones. J Cell Sci 113, 1139–1148.
- Frade, J.M., and Ovejero-Benito, M.C. (2015). Neuronal cell cycle: The neuron itself and its circumstances. Cell Cycle 14, 712–720.
- Giovanni, A., Keramaris, E., Morris, E.J., Hou, S.T., O’Hare, M., Dyson, N., Robertson, G.S., Slack, R.S., and Park, D.S. (2000). E2F1 mediates death of B-amyloid-treated cortical neurons in a manner independent of p53 and dependent on Bax and caspase 3. J. Biol. Chem. 275, 11553–11560.
- Lipinski, M.M., Macleod, K.F., Williams, B.O., Mullaney, T.L., Crowley, D., and Jacks, T. (2001). Cell-autonomous and non-cell-autonomous functions of the Rb tumor suppressor in developing central nervous system. EMBO J. 20, 3402–3413.
- Liu, D., Nath, N., Chellappan, S., and Greene, L. (2005). Regulation of neuron survival and death by p130 and associated chromatin modifiers. GENES Dev. 18, 719–723.
- Liu, N., Lucibello, F.C., Engeland, K., and Müller, R. (1998). A new model of cell cycle-regulated transcription: Repression of the cyclin A promoter by CDF-1 and anti-repression by E2F. Oncogene 16, 2957–2963.
- Merrick, K. a, and Fisher, R.P. (2011). Putting one step before the other: distinct activation pathways for Cdk1 and Cdk2 bring order to the mammalian cell cycle. 9, 706–714.
- Morillo, S.M., Abanto, E.P., Roman, M.J., and Frade, J.M. (2012). Nerve Growth Factor-Induced Cell Cycle Reentry in Newborn Neurons Is Triggered by p38MAPK-Dependent E2F4 Phosphorylation. Mol. Cell. Biol. 32, 2722–2737.
- Park, D.S., Morris, E.J., Padmanabhan, J., Shelanski, M.L., Geller, H.M., and Greene, L. a. (1998). Cyclin-dependent kinases participate in death of neurons evoked by DNA- damaging agents. J. Cell Biol. 143, 457–467.
- Smith, D.S., Leone, G., DeGregori, J., Ahmed, M.N., Qumsiyeh, M.B., and Nevins, J.R. (2000). Induction of DNA replication in adult rat neurons by deregulation of the retinoblastoma/E2F G1 cell cycle pathway. Cell Growth Differ. 11, 625–633.
- Williams, G.H., and Stoeber, K. (2012). The cell cycle and cancer. 352–364.
- Yang, Y., Mufson, E.J., and Herrup, K. (2003). Neuronal Cell Death Is Preceded by Cell Cycle Events at All Stages of Alzheimer’s Disease. J. Neurosci. 23, 2557–2563.
- Yasutis, K.M., and Kozminski, K.G. (2013). Cell cycle checkpoint regulators reach a zillion. Cell Cycle 12, 1501–1509.
