= George R. Goldner =

American art historian

- Education: Columbia University (BA); Princeton University (MFA, PhD)
- Occupation: Curator of The Metropolitan Museum of Art (1993–2015)
- Spouse: Nancy Krieg

George R. Goldner is an American curator and art historian. He is in charge of the Metropolitan Museum of Art's Department of Drawings and Prints from 1993 to 2015. He previously was J. Paul Getty Museum's curator of drawings and paintings from 1983 to 1993.

== Biography ==
Goldner received his B.A. in 1965 from Columbia University. He entered as a mathematics major and switched to art history after being encouraged by his roommate and best friend, Vieri Salvadori, son of Manhattan Project consultant and Columbia University professor Mario Salvadori, to visit Italy. He then earned a MFA and Ph.D. from Princeton University in 1972.

In the 1970s, he taught at the State University of New York at Albany for three years and spent seven years at Occidental College.

He left Occidental for the J. Paul Getty Museum in Los Angeles, where he was first head of the photo archives in 1979, then founded the drawings department in 1981 and was named its curator in 1983 by then-director John Walsh. Goldner became the curator of the paintings department in 1989.

Under his tenure, the Getty spent over $300 million in acquiring about 370 paintings. Goldner oversaw famous acquisitions including Portrait of Cosimo the Elder and Portrait of a Halberdier by Pontormo, Vincent van Gogh's Irises, Allegory of Fortune by Dosso Dossi, and La Promenade by Pierre-Auguste Renoir. He also has made important additions of works by Canaletto, Gerrit van Honthorst, Edouard Manet, and Peter Paul Rubens.

The Independent called him the "art world's number one spender."

In 1993, Goldner was hired by the Metropolitan Museum of Art to be Drue Heinz Chairman of the Department of Drawings and Prints. Over the next 21 years, he led his team in making 8,200 acquisitions and strengthened the collection "to the point where it is the most comprehensive and best in the US" with major works by Leonardo, Pontormo and Albrecht Altdorfer. Goldner announced retirement in 2014 and worked as an advisor to Leon Black in building his personal art collection. He did not accept payment from the patron until after he retired from the museum. He also remained an advisor to director Thomas P. Campbell until his 2017 exit.

== Personal life ==
Goldner married Nancy Krieg, a paintings restorer, on February 16, 1992. His first marriage ended in divorce.
