= Saint Anthony Abbot (Pontormo) =

Painting by Pontormo

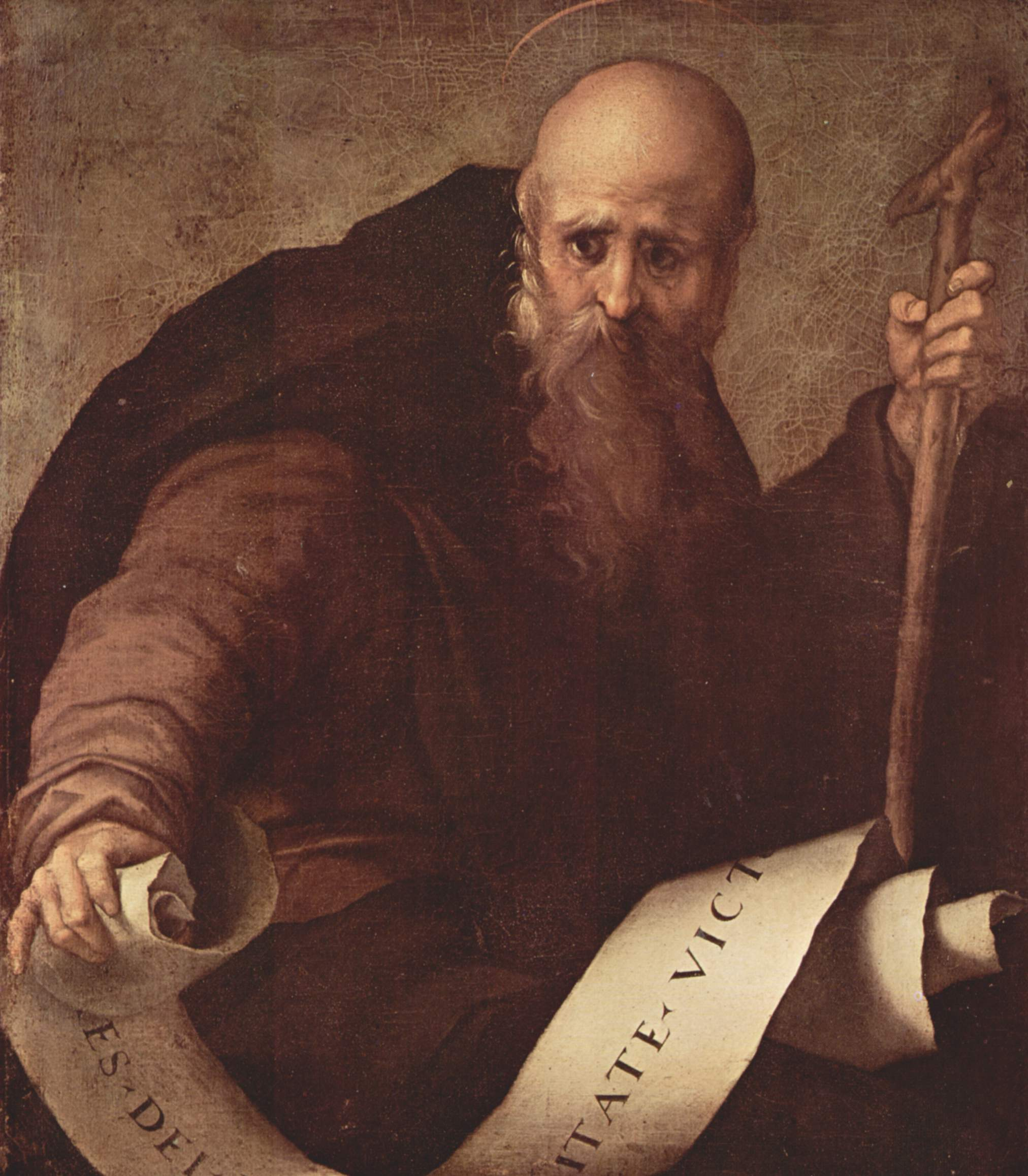
Saint Anthony Abbot (c. 1519) by Pontormo

Saint Anthony Abbot is an oil on panel painting by Pontormo, now in the Uffizi in Florence.

Its original location and commissioner are unknown, but it is dated to c 1519 is based on stylistic similarities to the St John in Pontorme and the very similar scroll in Portrait of Cosimo the Elder. This dating is universally accepted except by Clapp and Salvini, who argue for a later date.

Luciano Berti (1973) also sees a Durerian influence in the saint's expression and the sibyls and prophets from Michelangelo's Sistine Chapel ceiling in the gesture - Pontormo may have seen the latter on a trip to Rome around 1515 and his admiration for North European prints is also noted.
