= Woman with a Basket of Spindles =

Painting attributed to Pontormo or Andrea del Sarto

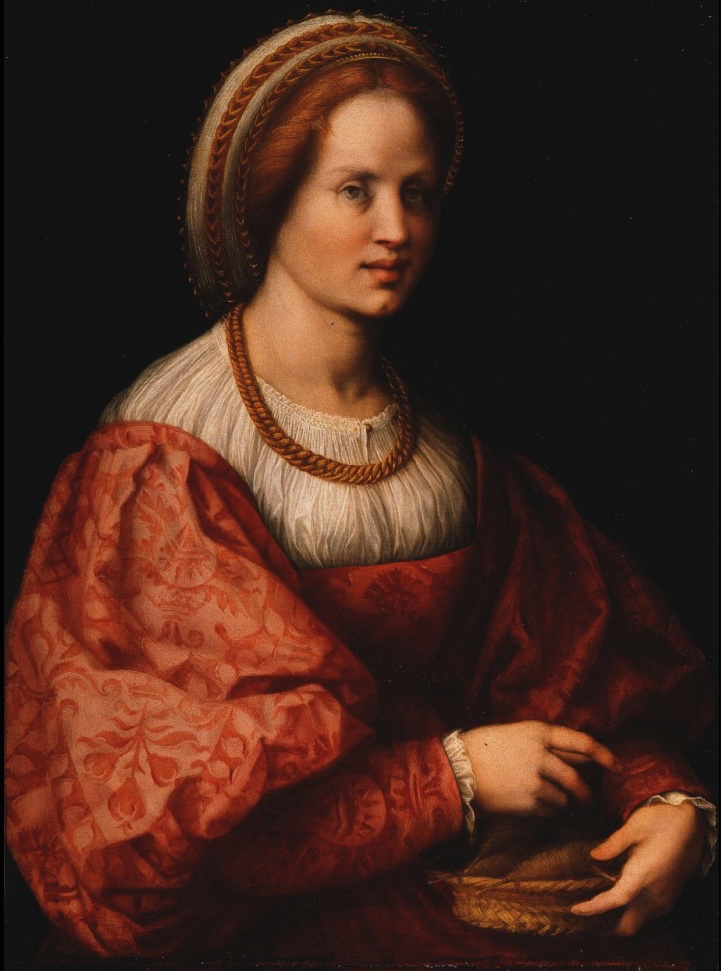
Woman with a Basket of Spindles (c. 1514–1515) attributed to Andrea del Sarto

Woman with a Basket of Spindles is an oil-on-panel painting, executed c. 1514–1515, now in the Uffizi in Florence. It is attributed to Pontormo or Andrea del Sarto. The work arrived in the Palazzo Pitti's gallery in 1773, as recorded in a note on the reverse, and in 1784 it was hanging in the Sala dell'Ermafrodito. It was last restored in 1996.

The attribution to Andrea del Sarto is traditional, though Gamba and others also speak of Pontormo and Bernard Berenson of one of the Puligo brothers. Luciano Berti supports the Pontormo attribution, seeing similarities to La Velata by Raphael, who was then in Rome and which the artist could have seen on a hypothetical trip in 1515. Antonio Natali supports the traditional attribution to Andrea del Sarto, whilst Philippe Costamagna assigns it to a student of Andrea and dates it to c.1525 based on the shape of the dress.
