= Expulsion from the Garden of Eden (disambiguation) =

The Expulsion from the Garden of Eden and the Expulsion from Paradise refer to the Biblical account of the ejection of Adam and Eve from the Garden of Eden as part of the Fall of man.

== Paintings ==
"Expulsion from the Garden of Eden" and "Expulsion from Paradise" are the names or subjects of various fine art works:

- Expulsion from the Garden of Eden, by Masaccio (c. 1425)
- Expulsion from the Garden of Eden (Cole), by Thomas Cole (c. 1828)
- Expulsion from Paradise (Pontormo), by Jacopo da Pontormo (c. 1535)
- Paradise Lost by John Milton (1667)
  - The Expulsion of Adam and Eve from the Garden of Eden, one of William Blake's illustrations of Paradise Lost (1807)
- The Expulsion from Paradise and The Creation by Giovanni di Paolo (1445)
- The Fall and Expulsion from Paradise in the Sistine Chapel ceiling, by Michelangelo (1512)

== Other artistic formats ==
- The Expulsion from Paradise (1977 film)
