= Portrait of a Musician (Pontormo) =

Painting by Pontormo

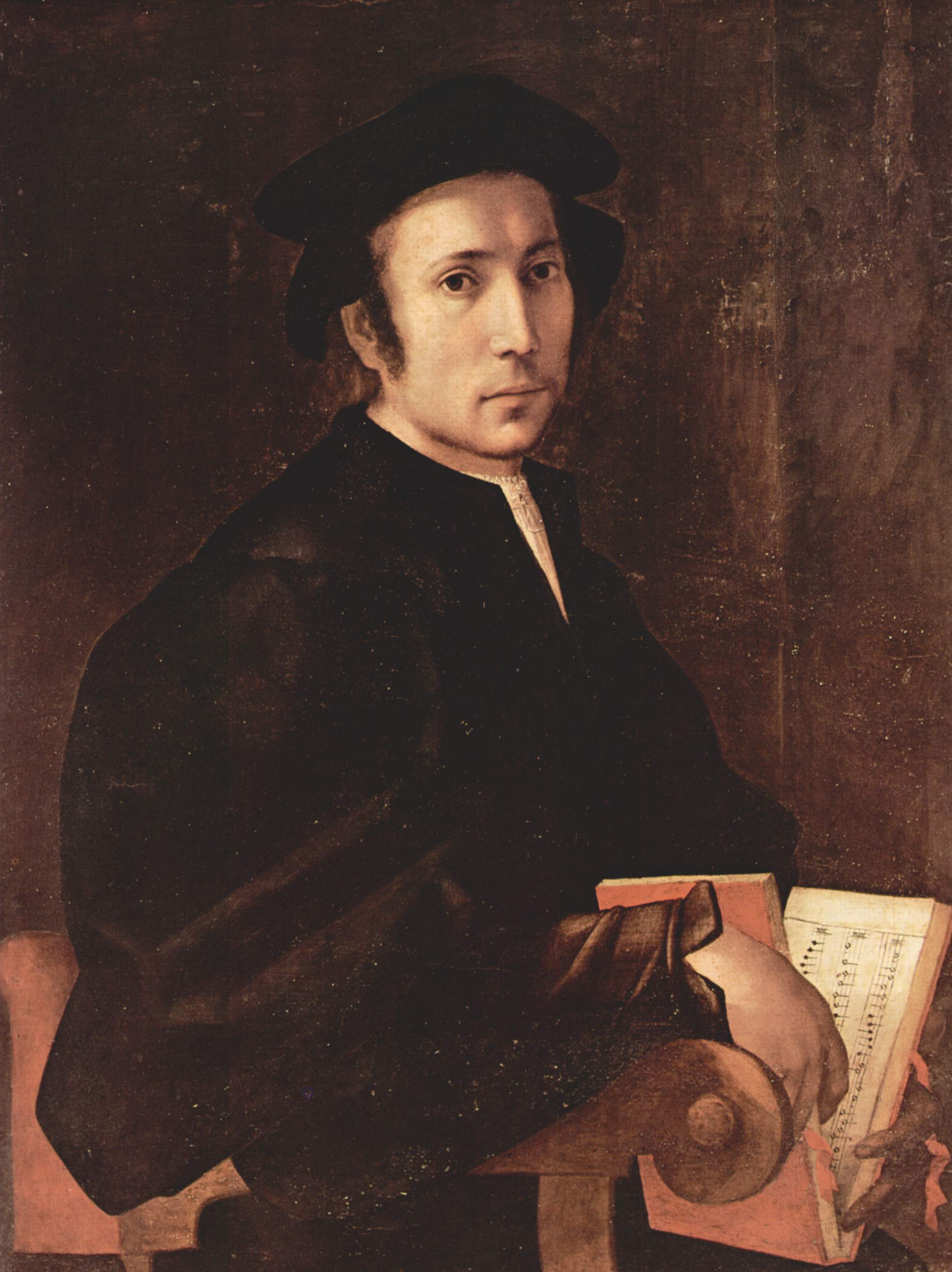
- Artist: Pontormo
- Year: c. 1518–1519
- Medium: Oil on panel
- Dimensions: 88 cm × 67 cm (35 in × 26 in)
- Location: Uffizi, Florence

Portrait of a Musician is an oil painting on panel by Pontormo in the Uffizi. It is dated on stylistic grounds to c. 1518–1519; the art historian Luciano Berti places it in Pontormo's youthful phase alongside his Pucci Altarpiece, Saint John the Evangelist and Michael the Archangel.

The portrait is recorded in Cardinal Leopoldo de' Medici's collection, and formerly appeared in its catalogue attributed to Andrea del Sarto with the subject identified as Francesco dell'Ajolle. Carlo Gamba restored the present attribution, which came to be universally accepted by other art historians. In 1959 Keutner removed the identification of the subject as Francesco dell'Ajolle, who he instead argued was the subject of Rosso Fiorentino's Portrait of a Man in the National Gallery of Art in Washington, D.C.
