= Annunciation (Pontormo) =

Fresco by Pontormo

Annunciation (The Virgin Mary)
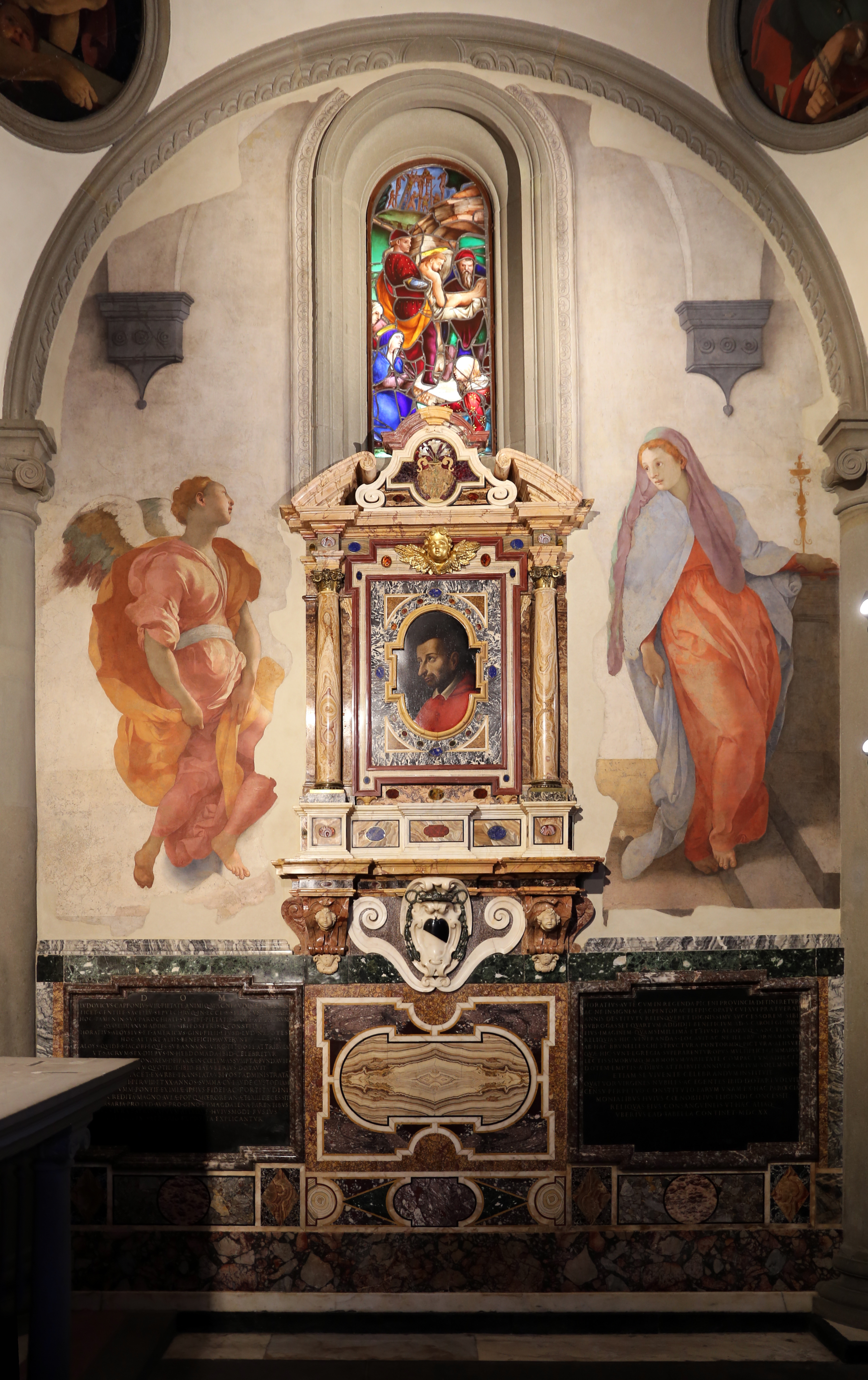
- Artist: Jacopo Pontormo
- Year: c. 1527–1528
- Type: Fresco
- Dimensions: 368 cm × 168 cm (145 in × 66 in)
- Location: Santa Felicita; Florence

The Annunciation is a wall painting by the Italian mannerist artist Jacopo Pontormo, executed in 1527–1528 as part of his commission to decorate the Capponi Chapel in the church of Santa Felicita, Florence, Italy.

It is frescoed around the window on the wall adjacent to Pontormo's masterpiece, the famous Deposition from the Cross. Pontormo depicts the Annunciation, the revelation to Mary by the Archangel Gabriel that she would conceive a child to be born the Son of God, in a lively composition, with both figures in an elastic contrapposto.

== Sources ==
- Cesati, Franco (2002). Le chiese di Firenze. Rome: Newton Compton.
