= Sacrificial Scene =

16th c. painting by Pontormo

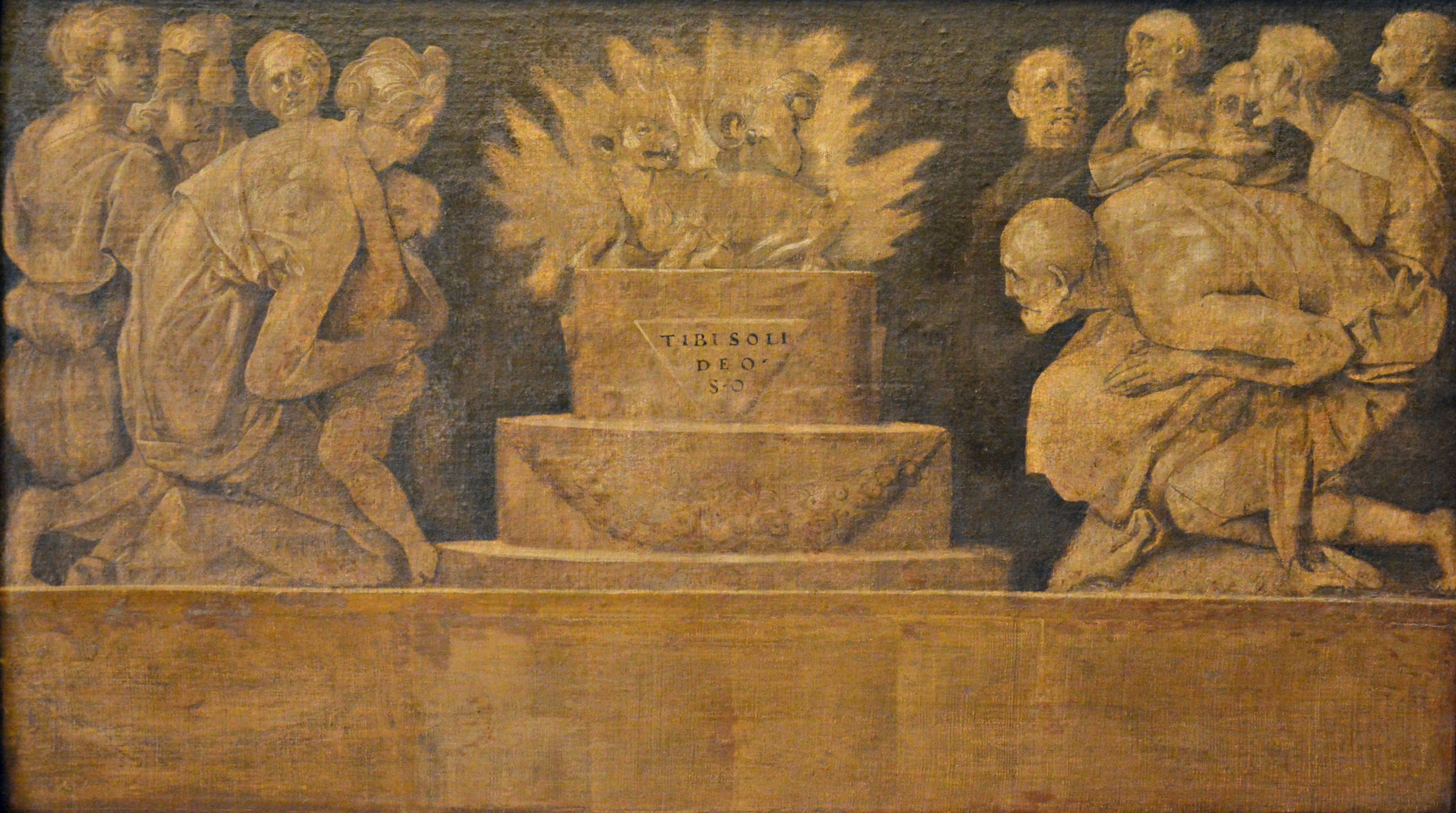
Sacrificial Scene (c. 1520) by Pontormo

Sacrificial Scene is a grisaille tempera on canvas painting by Pontormo, produced around 1520 and now in the National Museum of Capodimonte in Naples. It was probably originally produced as part of the decoration of an interior in honour of Cosimo de' Medici.

The canvas was later mounted on panel, probably to be part of a mobile apparatus. It first appeared in the Farnese collection inventories in 1644 and was moved to Naples with the rest of the collection late in the 18th century, where it was displayed in Room 10 of the Capodimonte Museum.

== Bibliography ==
- (in Italian) Mariella Utili and Barbara Maria Savy, Museo di Capodimonte - La Galleria Farnese: dipinti italiani, Napoli, Electa Editore, 1999, ISBN 978-88-435-8618-9.
