= Holy Family with the Infant Saint John the Baptist (Pontormo) =

Painting by Pontormo

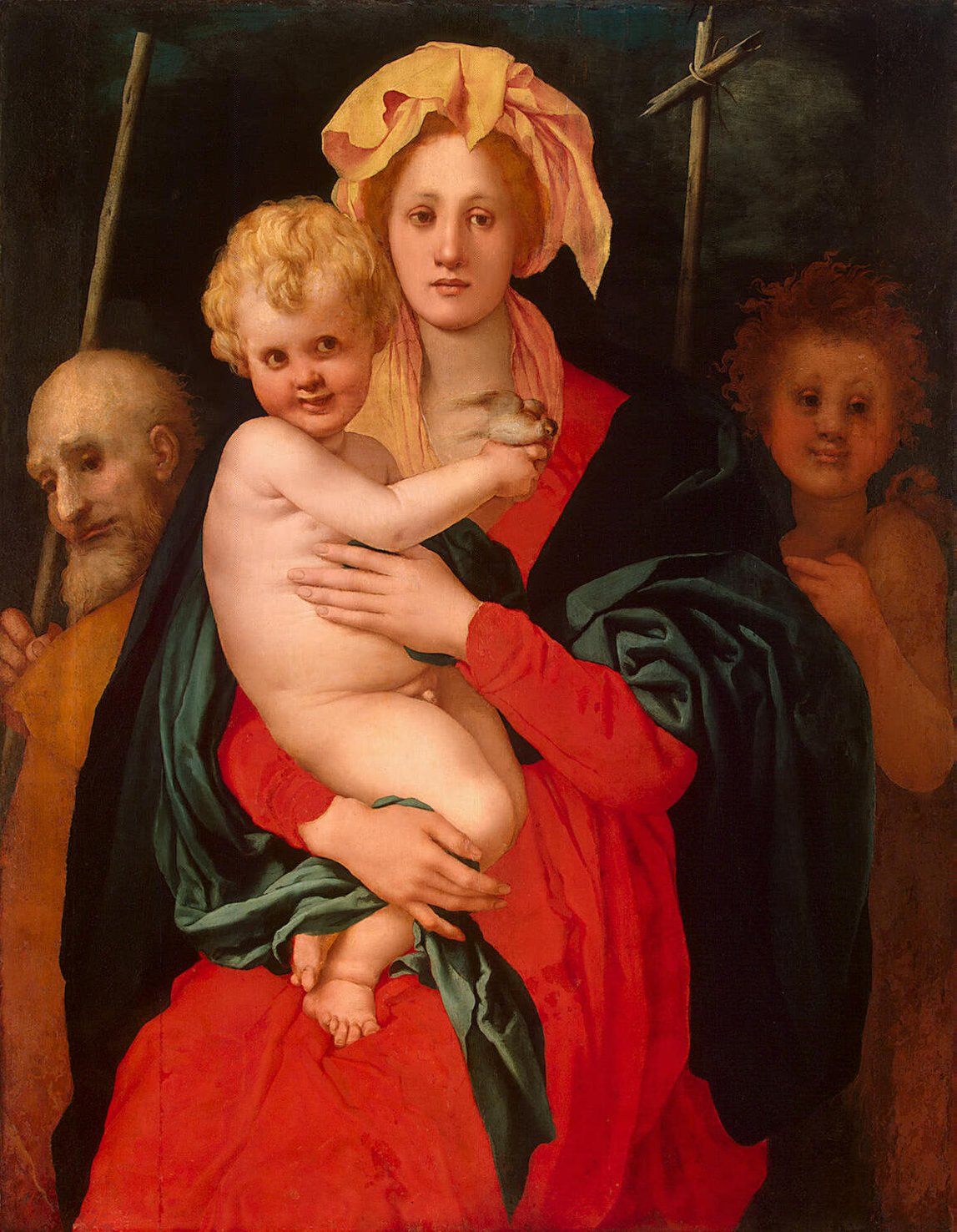
Holy Family with the Infant Saint John the Baptist (c. 1522–1523) by Pontormo

Holy Family with the Infant Saint John the Baptist is a c.1522-1523 oil on panel painting by Pontormo, produced early in his career. It now hangs in the Hermitage Museum, which acquired it with countess E. I. Mordvinova's collection. A preparatory drawing survives in the Uffizi's Gabinetto dei Disegni e delle Stampe.
