= Penitent Saint Jerome (Pontormo) =

Painting by Pontormo

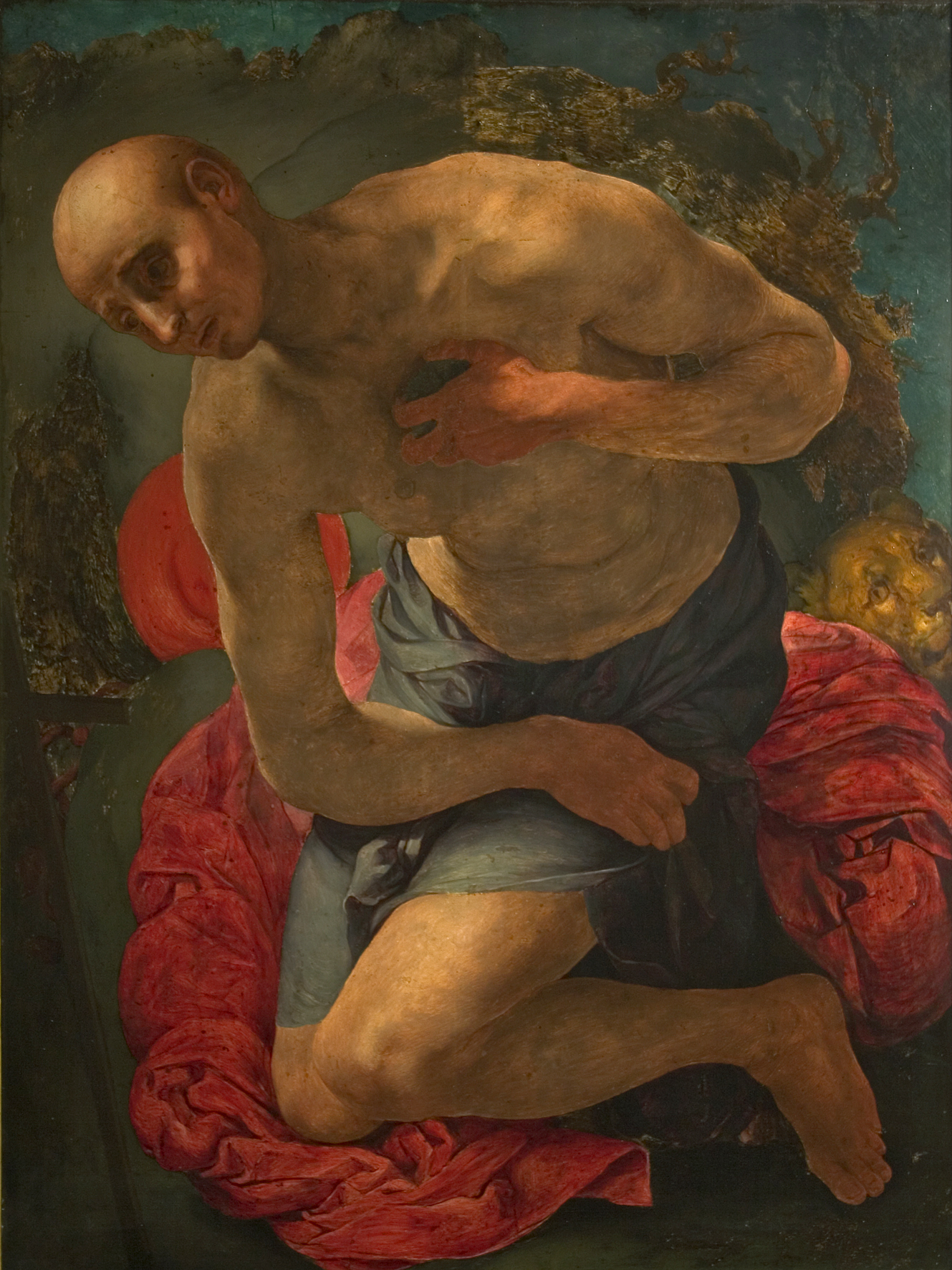
Penitent Saint Jerome by Pontormo

Penitent Saint Jerome is an oil on panel painting by Pontormo, now in the KunstWelten section of the Landesmuseum Hanover. In a poor state of preservation, it is generally dated to c. 1525–1528, the period in which the artist worked on the Capponi Chapel. Unusually it shows the saint as a clean-shaven young man rather than a bearded old one. Previously in August Kestner's collection, it was the first work by the artist to enter a German museum.
