= Venus and Cupid (Pontormo) =

Painting by Pontormo

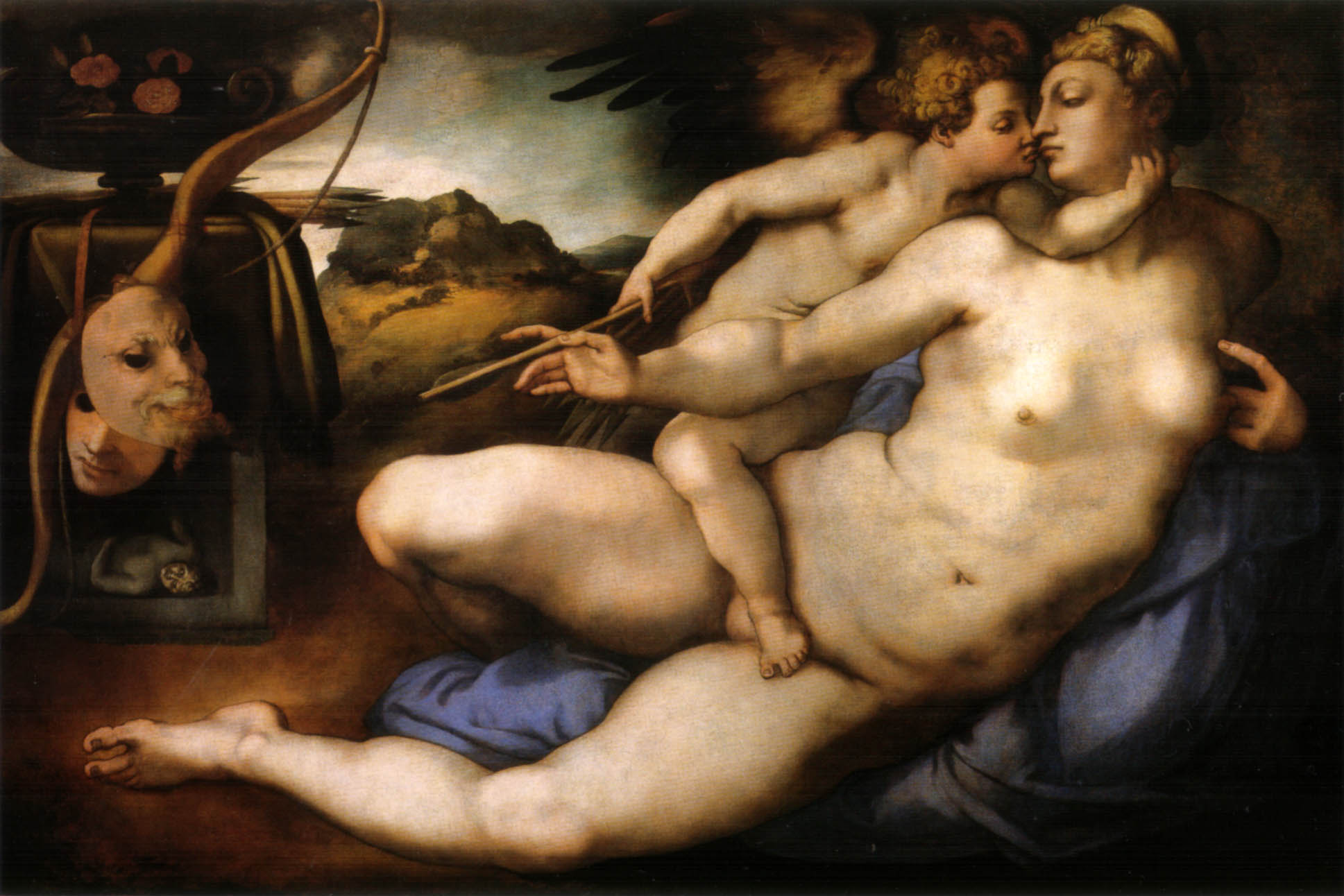
- Year: 1533
- Dimensions: 128 cm (50 in) × 194 cm (76 in)

Venus and Cupid is an oil painting on panel of c. 1533 by Pontormo, from a lost drawing or cartoon by Michelangelo, in the Galleria dell'Accademia in Florence. A preparatory study is in the British Museum and a copy by Michele di Ridolfo del Ghirlandaio is in the Palazzo Colonna in Rome. Other copies are in the Royal Collection at Kensington Palace, in Hildesheim, a small version in Geneva attributed to Michele Tosini and two in the Museo di Capodimonte in Naples (one attributed to Hendrick van den Broeck and the other an anonymous drawing). Giorgio Vasari made three copies for Ottaviano de' Medici.

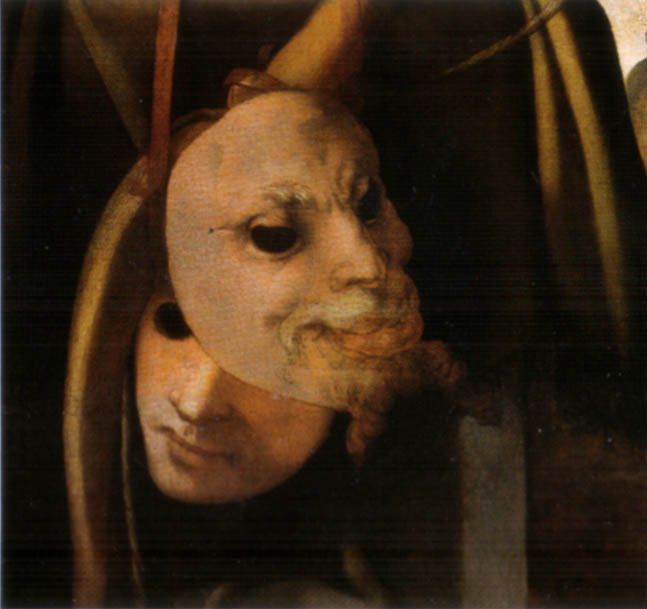
Detail

Michelangelo's drawing was first recorded by the Anonimo Magliabechiano (1537–1542), who also noted that Pontormo's painting derived from it was produced for Bartolomeo Bettini, a friend of Michelangelo's. The drawing must have been produced between 1532 and 1533 and the painting in 1533, before Michelangelo left for Rome the following year. A drawing found in Naples was once thought to be Michelangelo's, but is now thought to be a copy.

The painting was owned by Alessandro de' Medici and early in its life it was censored to cover Venus's nudity, as was the Rome copy. It was recorded in inventories of the Guardaroba medicea in 1553 and 1560 and was praised by Benedetto Varchi, who wrote that it made men fall in love with it "as with Praxiteles's Venus". The work was only rediscovered in 1850 and two years later the restorer Ulisse Forni removed most of the repainting except for the piece of cloth across Venus's genitalia, mostly restoring it to its original appearance. That cloth was finally removed in 2002.
