= Scene from Hospital Life =

Fresco fragment by Pontormo, c. 1514

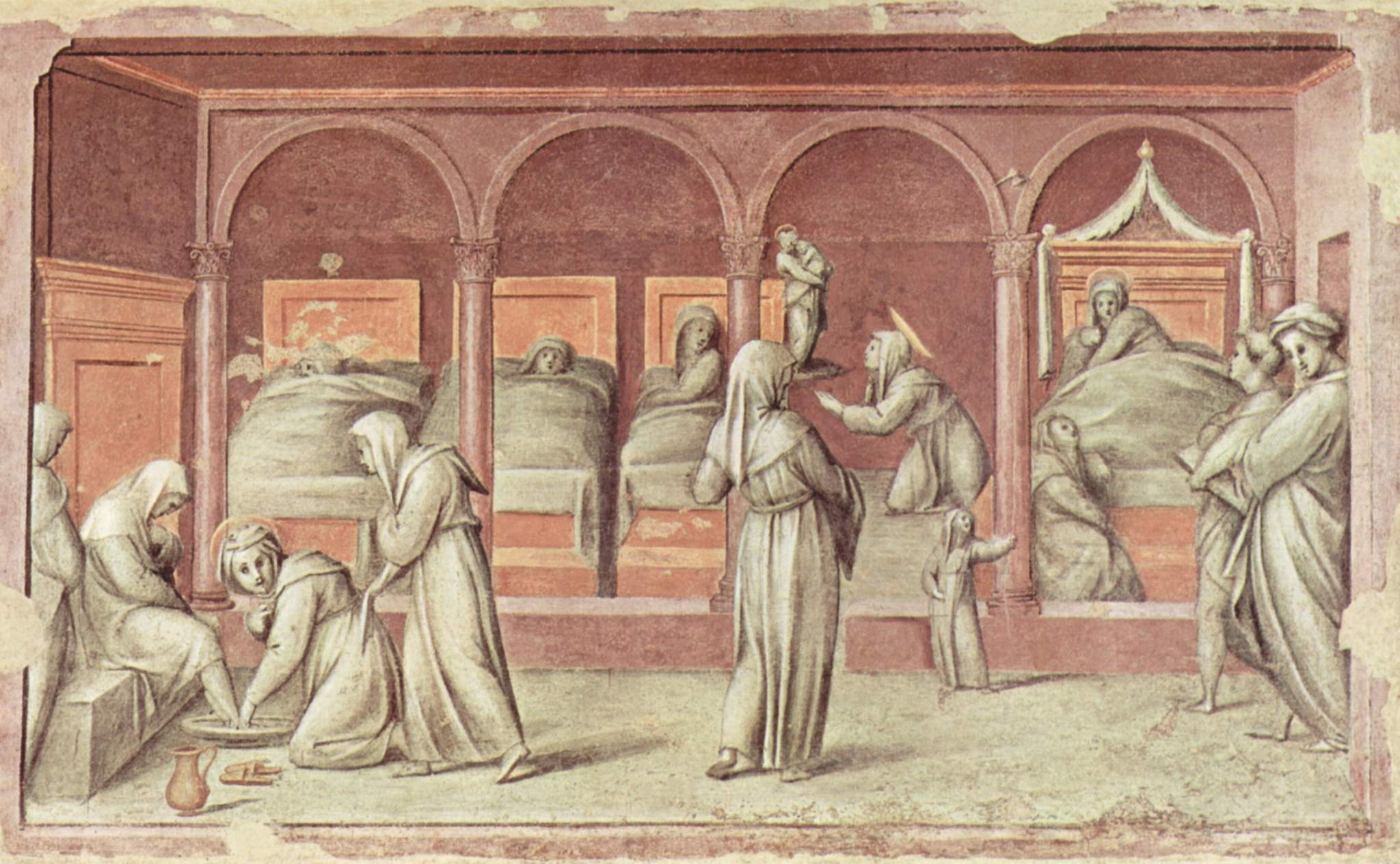
Scene from Hospital Life (c. 1514) by Pontormo

Scene from Hospital Life is a monochrome fresco fragment by Pontormo, executed c. 1514, originally in Florence's Ospedale di San Matteo, from which it was removed in the 18th century when that building was converted into a museum. It is now in the city's Galleria dell'Accademia.

It was previously attributed to Andrea del Sarto, but Carlo Gamba suggested its reattribution as an early work by Pontormo, supported by Bernard Berenson and now unanimously held among art critics. Its dating is based on other works from 1514 such as Andrea del Sarto's Birth of the Virgin in the Chiostro dei Voti. A sketch of two women by Pontormo now in Munich (14042r, cfr. Cox Rearick, n. 17) is argued by some to be for Pontormo's Visitation in the Chiostro dei Voti, but by Luciano Berti to be a preparatory drawing for Scene.
