= Virgin and Child with Saint Anne and Four Saints =

Painting by Pontormo

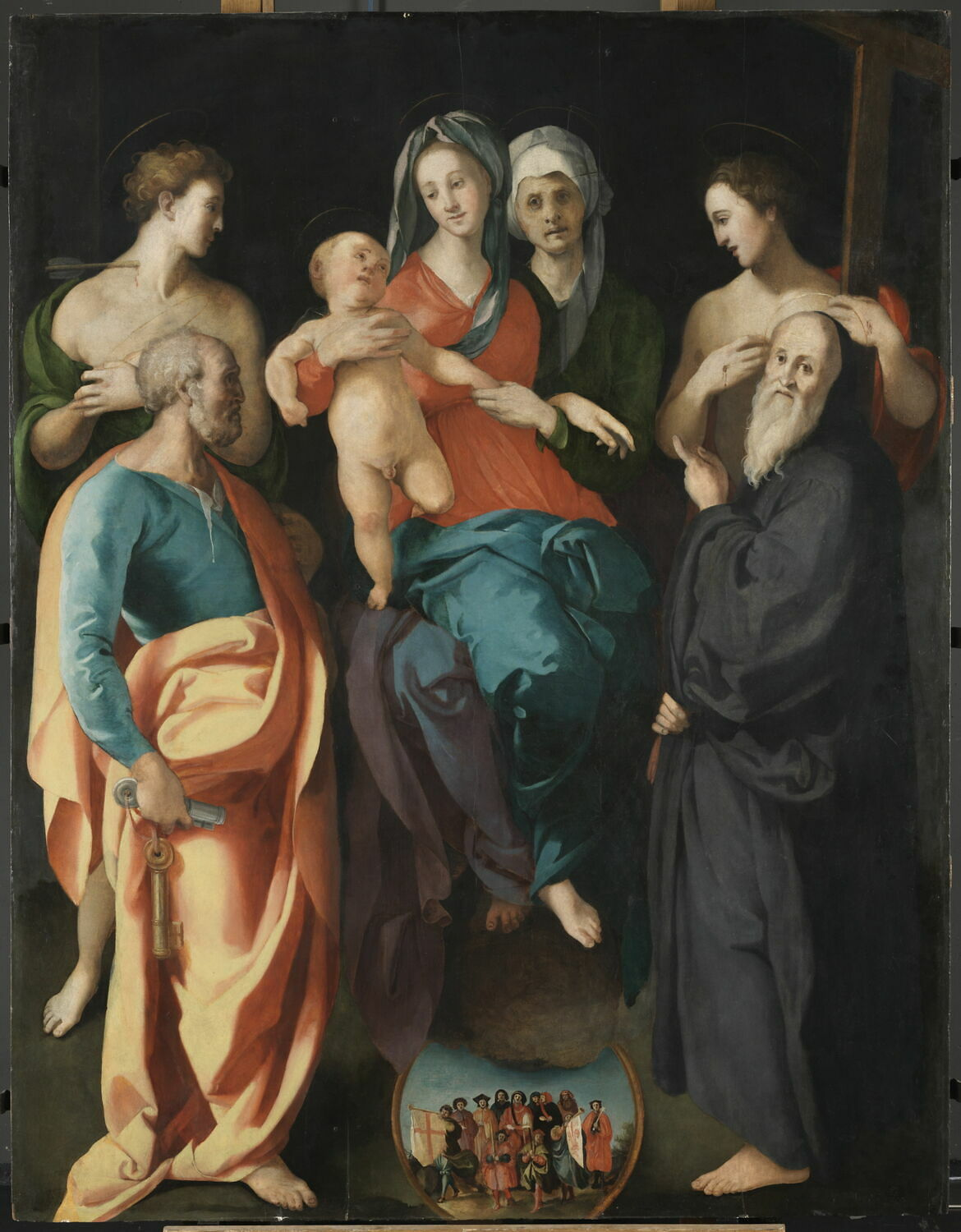
- Artist: Pontormo
- Year: c. 1524–1528
- Medium: Oil on panel
- Location: Louvre, Paris

The Virgin and Child with Saint Anne and Four Saints is an oil painting on panel by Pontormo in the Louvre, Paris. References in Giorgio Vasari's Lives of the Artists are taken by some to date the work to 1528–1529, the years immediately after Pontormo painted the Capponi Chapel. More recent art historians argue that its style is close to works he produced between 1524 and 1526.

The work was produced for the monastery of Sant'Anna in Verzaia outside Florence's Porta San Frediano, hence the presence of Saint Anne. From left to right the other saints are Sebastian in green, Peter in saffron and blue, the Good Thief, and Benedict of Nursia in a monk's habit. Until 1370 the monastery's church was the halfway point of a procession on Saint Anne's feast day (26 July) to commemorate the city's "liberation" from the Duke of Athens. The medallion at the foot of the Madonna's throne shows a group of people from the procession, including an infantry captain (the work's commissioner), the heads of companies, trumpeters, pipers, dealers, "commanders" and "benchers".

The monastery was destroyed during the 1529 Siege of Florence and the work was in the Ospedale Sant'Eusebio al Prato in the western part of Florence's historic city centre by 1813, when it was looted by Napoleon and taken to Paris. It was first exhibited at the Louvre in 1814 and not returned to Florence after the end of the Napoleonic Wars.
