= Madonna and Child with the Infant Saint John the Baptist (Pontormo) =

Painting by Pontormo

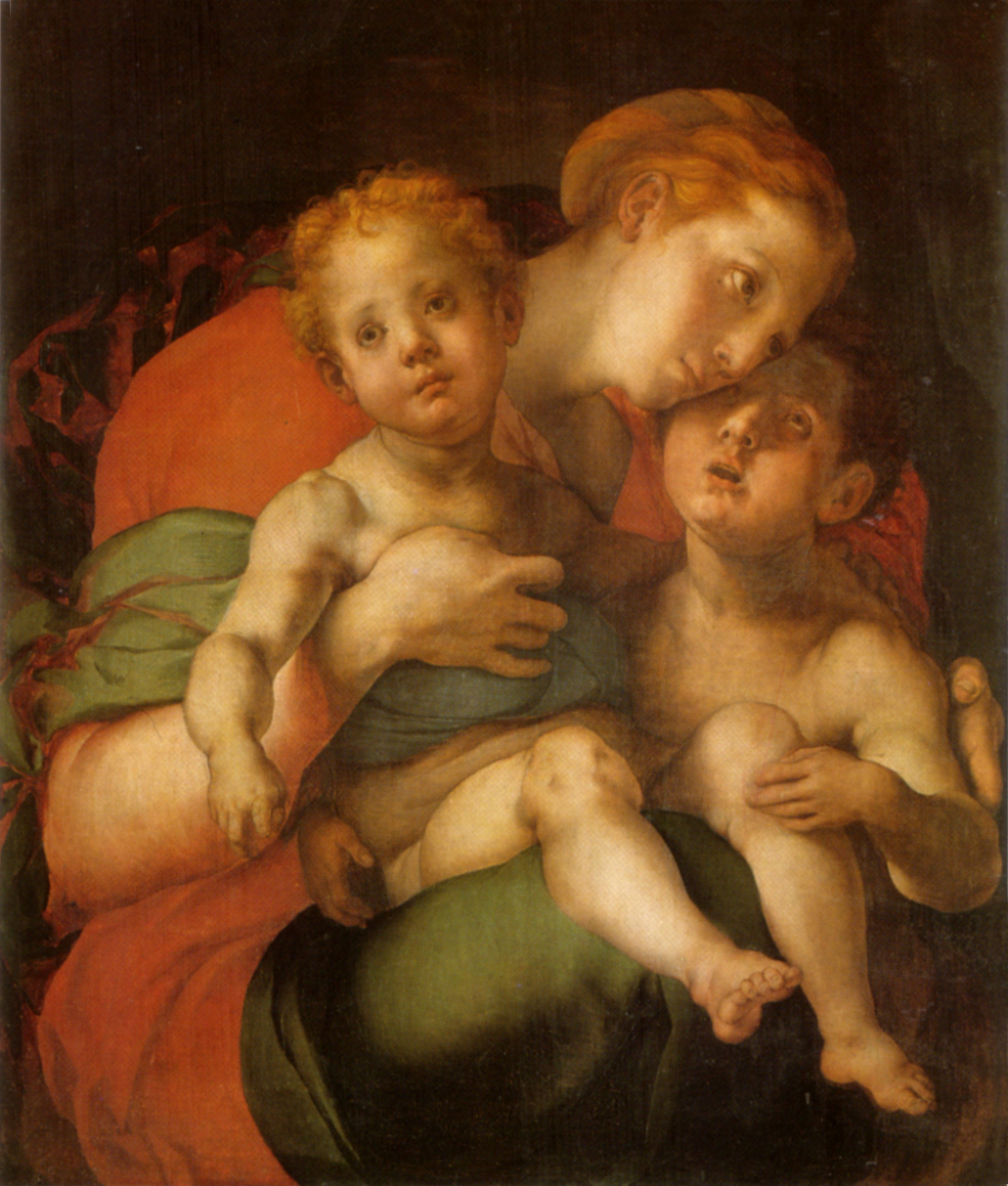
Madonna and Child with the Infant Saint John the Baptist (c. 1529–1536) by Pontormo

Madonna and Child with the Infant Saint John the Baptist is an oil on panel painting by Pontormo, now in the Uffizi, whose Gabinetto dei Disegni e delle Stampe also houses a preparatory drawing for the work. The two theories on its dating are 1534-1536 and Antonio Natali's theory of 1529–1530.

The figure and expression of John the Baptist draws on contemporary works by Michelangelo such as the Medici Madonna Vasari's Lives of the Artists states that Pontormo offered a work on a similar subject the bricklayer Rossino in payment for work on his home, begun in 1529 and only finished in 1534-1535 - this is thought to be the Uffizi work. It was then probably acquired by Alessandro di Ottaviano de' Medici, before being acquired by the Grand Dukes of Tuscany. It was rediscovered in Galleria's stores by Gamba and its attribution to Pontormo strengthened, with no substantial doubts remaining as to its autograph status.
