= Boldrone Shrine =

Shrine in Quarto, Florence, Italy

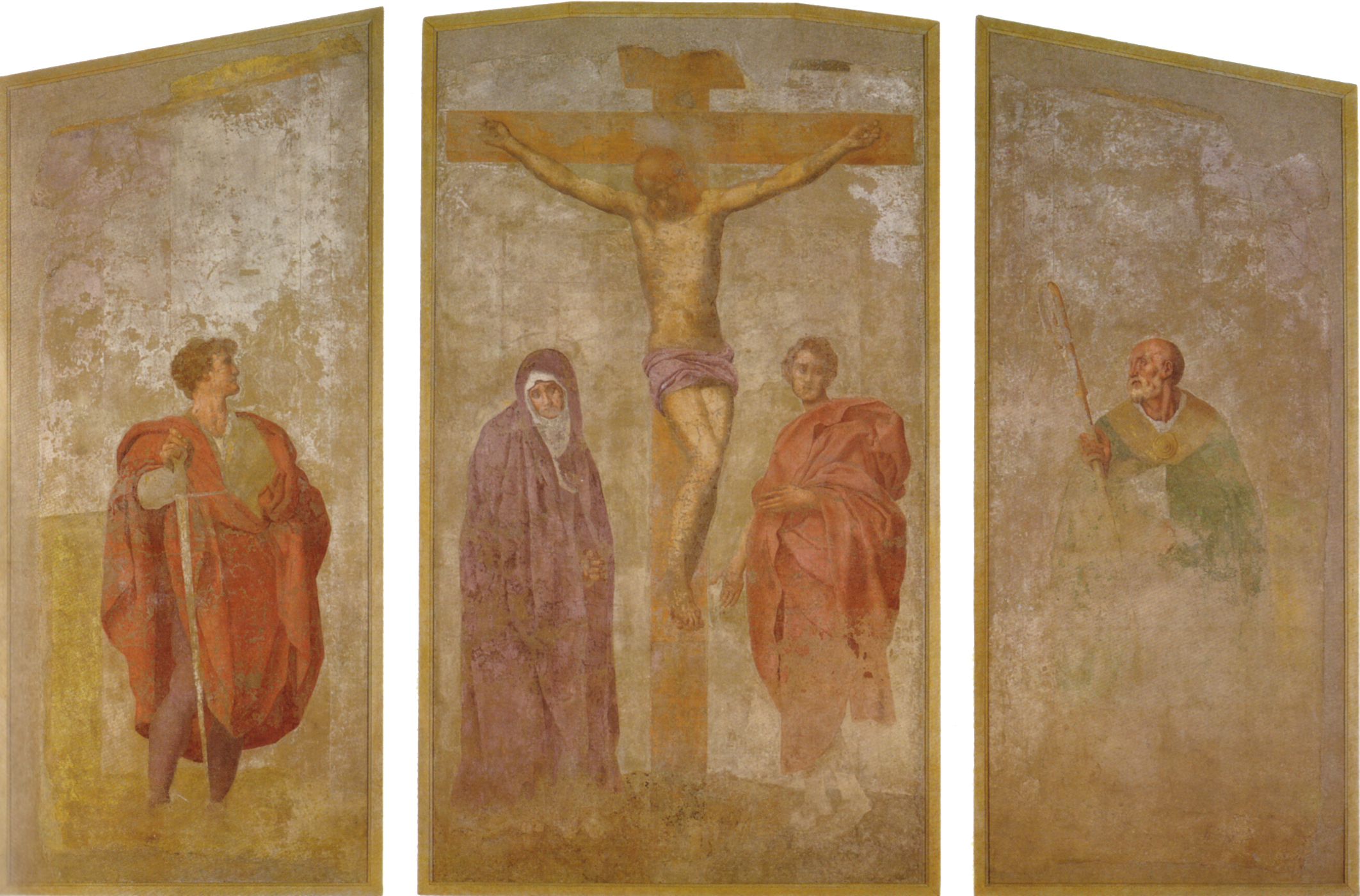
The frescoes

The Boldrone Shrine is located at the corner of the Via di Boldrone and the Via dell'Osservatorio in the Quarto district of Florence. It was named after the monastery of San Giovanni Evangelista di Boldrone, which was itself named after the French "Boldrone" hermitage founded on that site in the 13th century.

The shrine originally contained a group of frescoes by Pontormo, dating to c. 1521–1522, which have now been replaced by modern copies. The originals are exhibited in the Palazzo dell'Arte dei Beccai in Florence, the base of the Accademia delle Arti del Disegno. They are stylistically close to the artist's Vertumnus and Pomona. The central panel depicts the Crucifixion with the Virgin Mary and John the Apostle (the latter being the monastery's patron), whilst the side panels show Julian the Hospitaller (left) and Augustine of Hippo (right).

== Gallery ==
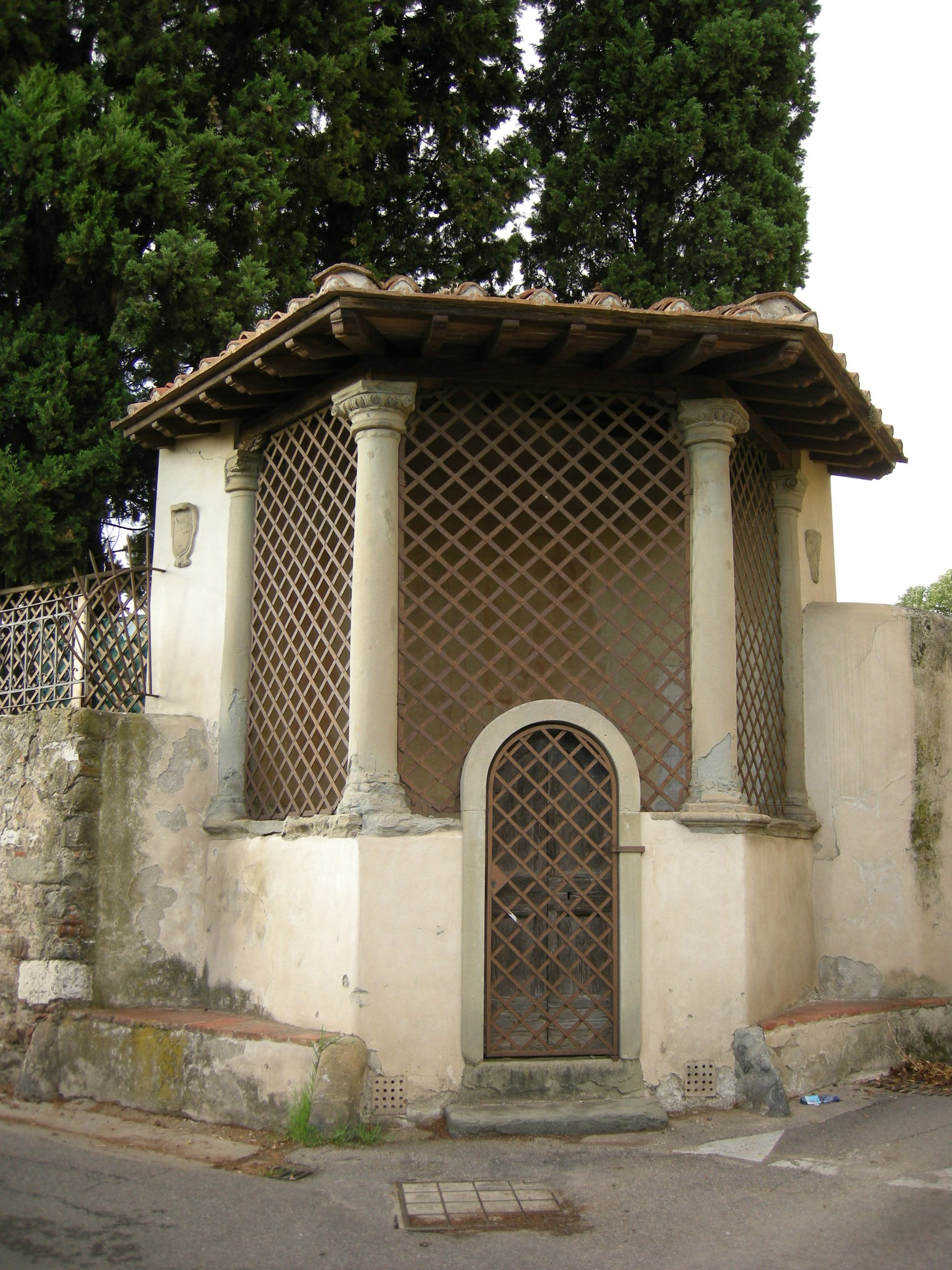
Shrine

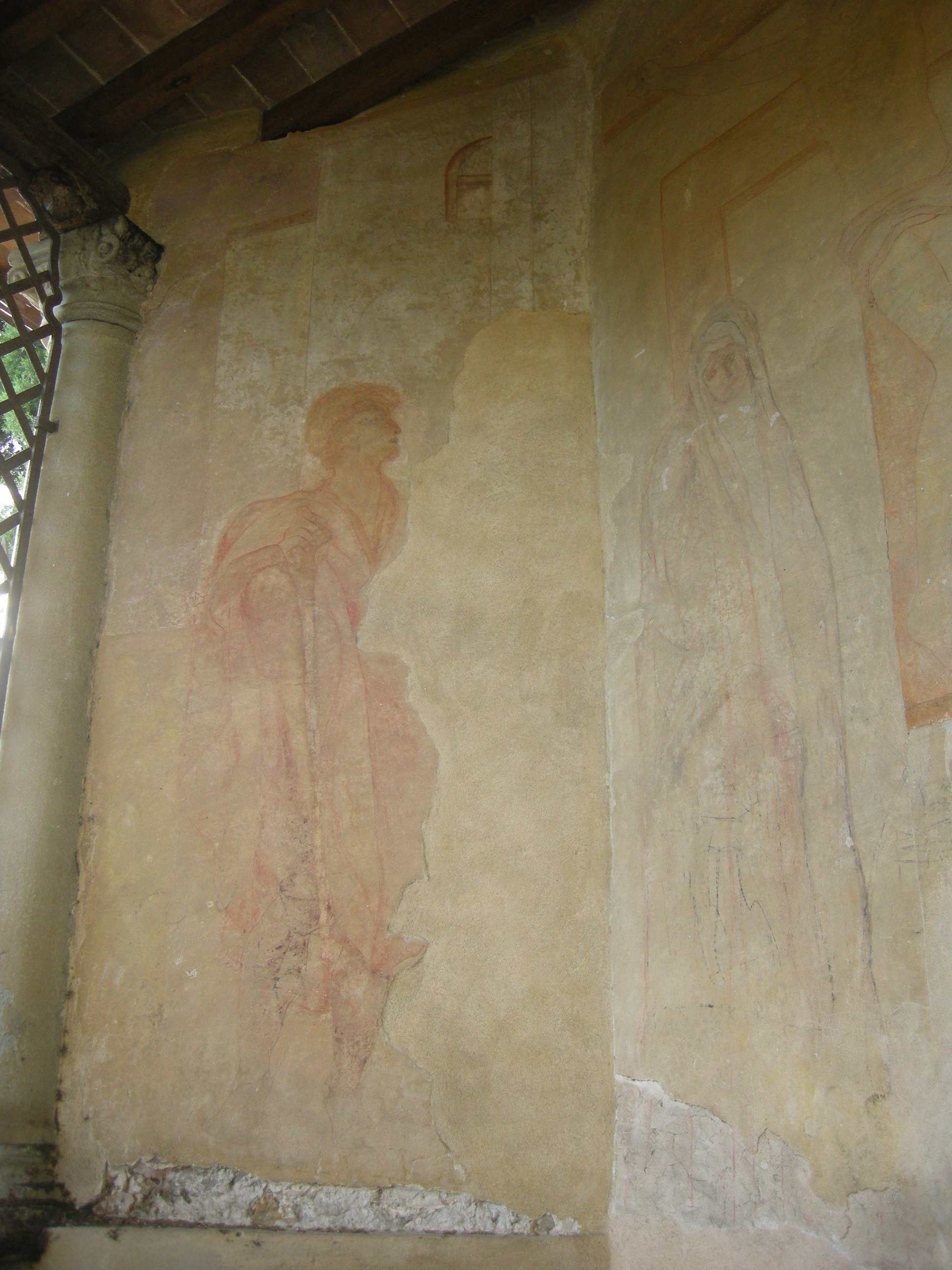
Modern copies

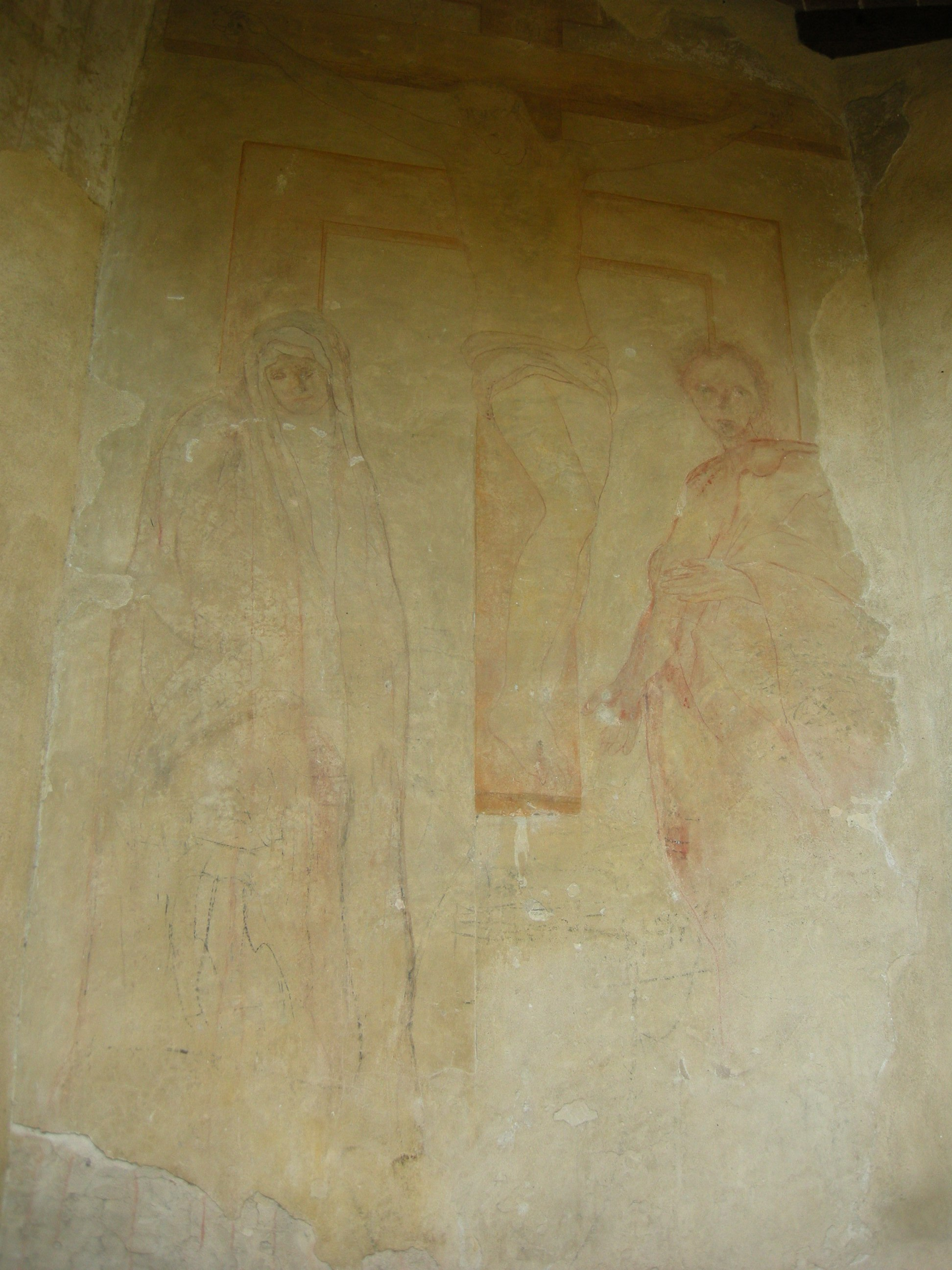
Modern copies
