= The Ten Thousand Martyrs (painting) =

Painting by Pontormo

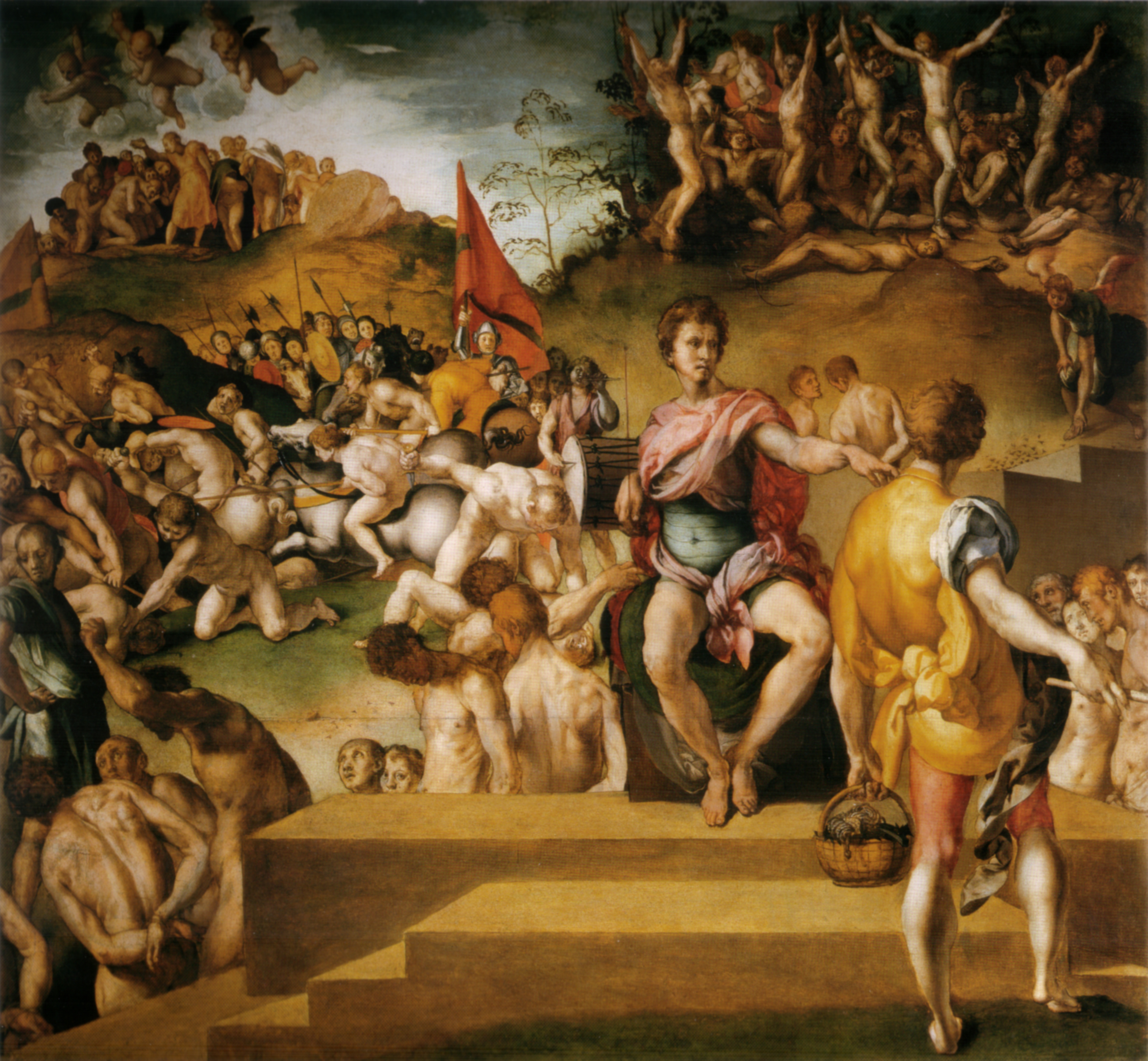
The Ten Thousand Martyrs (c. 1529–1530) by Pontormo

The Ten Thousand Martyrs is an oil on panel painting by Pontormo, executed c. 1529–1530, produced for the monks of Florence's Spedale degli Innocenti and now in the city's Galleria Palatina. It shows the martyrdom of the eponymous martyrs alongside Saint Maurice. A copy of the left hand side of the work in the Uffizi is attributed to a young Bronzino.
