= John Walsh (art historian) =

American art historian (born 1937)

- Born: 1937 (age 88–89); Mason City, Washington
- Education: Columbia University
- Scientific career
- Workplaces: J. Paul Getty Museum
- Thesis: Jan and Julius Porcellis: Dutch Marine Painters (1974)
- Doctoral advisor: Julius S. Held

John Joseph Walsh Jr. (born 1937 in Mason City, Washington) is an American art historian, curator and museum director. He served as director of the J. Paul Getty Museum from 1983 to 2000, supervising the planning and completion of the Getty's Richard Meier-designed Getty Center and transforming the Getty's art collection through new acquisitions.

Walsh graduated from Yale University in 1961, where he was a member of Skull and Bones. Walsh earned a Ph.D. from Columbia University. He worked in curatorial capacities at the Frick Collection and the Metropolitan Museum of Art in New York and the Museum of Fine Arts, Boston, prior to assuming the directorship of the Getty. Walsh is now on the Board of Trustees of the Hammer Museum
