= Portrait of a Halberdier =

Painting by Pontormo

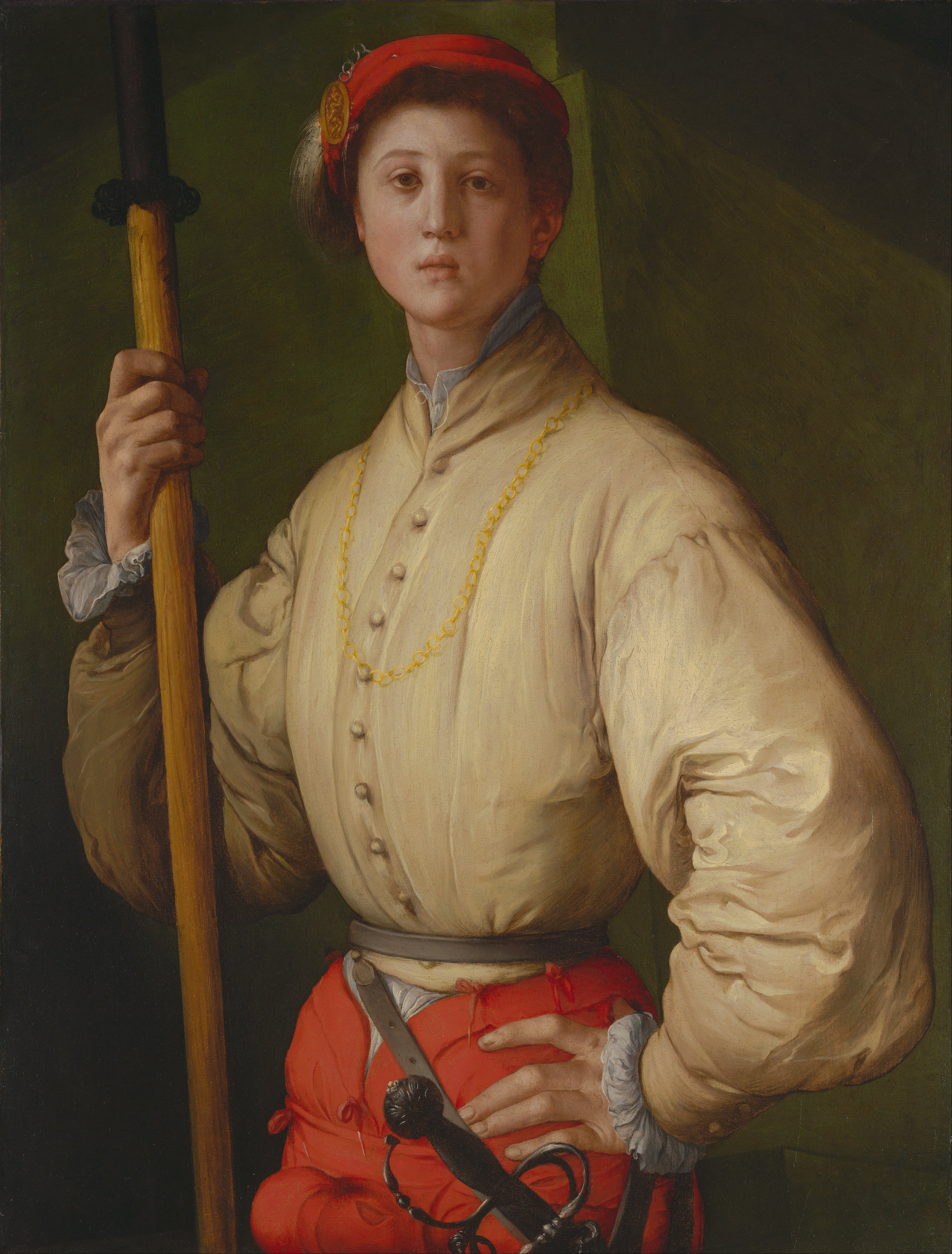
Portrait of a Halberdier (1529-1530) by Pontormo

Portrait of a Halberdier, The Halberdier or Man with a Halberd is a 1529-1530 or 1537 oil painting by Pontormo, originally painted on panel and later transferred to canvas. It is now in the Getty Museum in Los Angeles. A preparatory drawing now in Florence's Gabinetto dei Disegni e delle Stampe shows the figure in a more frontal and less contraposto pose.

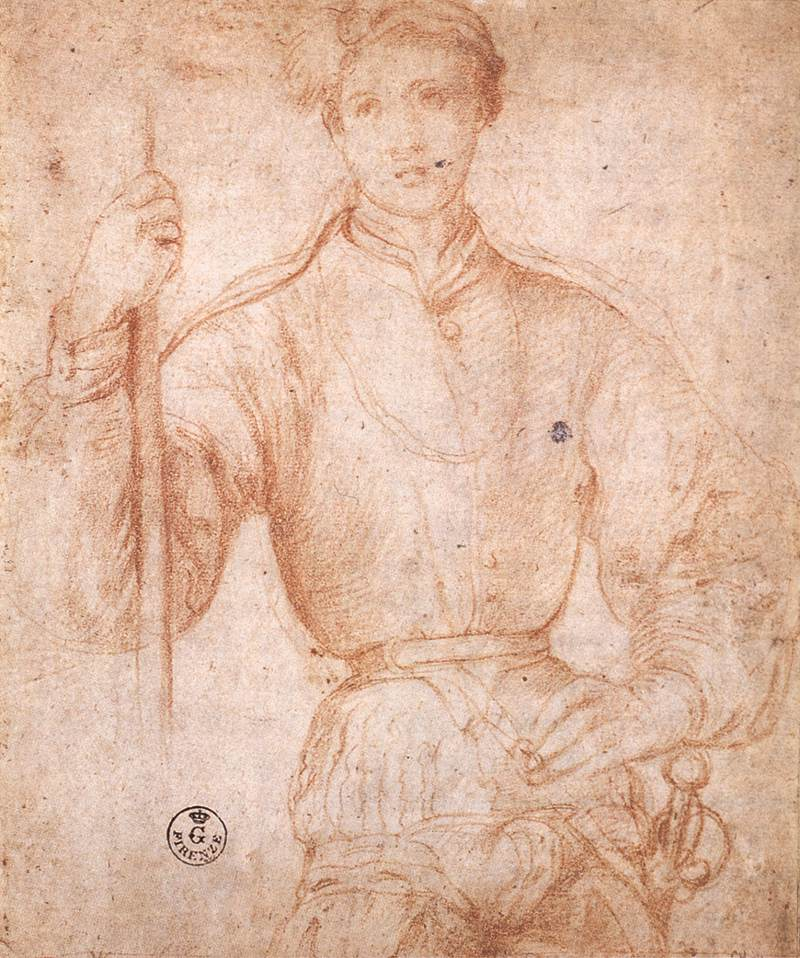
Preparatory drawing

It was long thought to show Francesco Guardi, a very young soldier of the Florentine Republic during the Siege of Florence, since Vasari's Lives of the Artists records a portrait of Guardi by Pontormo. Others have argued it shows a young Cosimo I de' Medici after his victory at the 1537 Battle of Montemurlo, based on a note in a historic inventory.

The work is recorded in the Riccardi family collection in Florence before passing through a number of other private collections. In May 1989 it was auctioned to its present owner for 32.5 million dollars, the highest price for an old master painting up to that date.
