= Expulsion from Paradise (Pontormo) =

Painting by Pontormo

- Expulsion of Adam and Eve
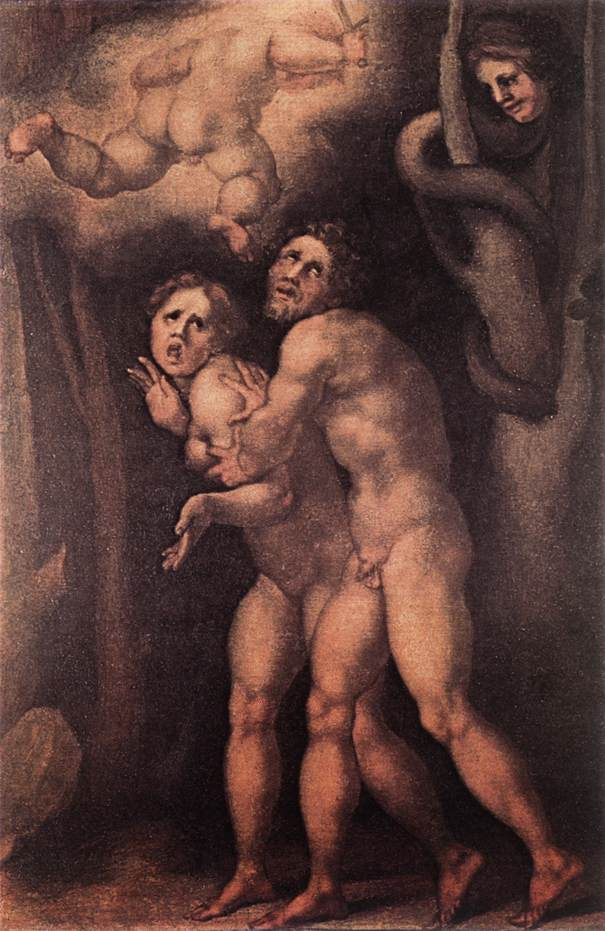
- Artist: Jacopo Pontormo
- Year: c. 1535
- Type: Oil on panel
- Dimensions: 43 cm × 31 cm (17 in × 12 in)
- Location: Uffizi, Florence

Expulsion from Paradise or the Expulsion of Adam and Eve is an oil on panel painting by Pontormo, now in the Uffizi in Florence, whose Gabinetto Disegni e Stampe also has a preparatory drawing for it. Its dating is also uncertain and varies between c.1519 and c.1543, but is held to be c.1535 by the Uffizi.

It is heavily influenced by Masaccio, such as the serpent wrapped round a tree in his Brancacci Chapel frescos. It is mentioned in the inventory of cardinal Leopoldo de' Medici's collection with its correct attribution, but by the time it was mentioned in the Gallerie fiorentine inventory of 1796 it had been misattributed to Francesco Salviati, a misattribution which lasted until 1825. The attribution to Pontormo is accepted by all modern critics except Berti and Clapp. La Forlanini theorises that it originally formed part of a series.
