= Puligo =

Puligo is a surname. Notable people with the surname include:

- Domenico Puligo (1492–1527), Italian painter
- Jacone Puligo, 16th-century Italian painter
