= Pontormo =

Florentine Mannerist painter

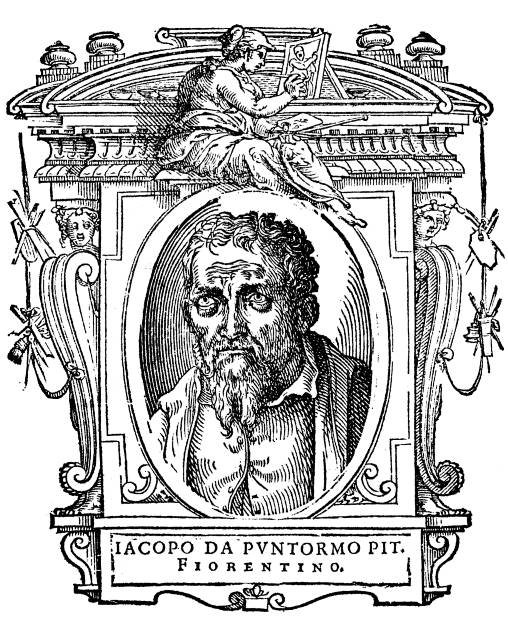
- Illustration from Lives of the Most Excellent Painters, Sculptors, and Architects by Giorgio Vasari, 1568 edition
- Born: Jacopo Carucci; May 24, 1494; Pontorme near Empoli, Republic of Florence
- Died: January 2, 1557 (aged 62); Florence, Republic of Florence
- Known for: Painting
- Notable work: The Deposition from the Cross
- Movement: Mannerism

Jacopo Carucci or Carrucci (IPA: [ˈjaːkopo ka(r)ˈruttʃi]; May 24, 1494 – January 2, 1557), usually known as Jacopo (da) Pontormo or simply Pontormo (IPA: [ponˈtormo]), was an Italian Mannerist painter and portraitist from the Florentine School. His work represents a profound stylistic shift from the calm perspectival regularity that characterized the art of the Florentine Renaissance. He is famous for his use of twining poses, coupled with ambiguous perspective; his figures often seem to float in an uncertain environment, unhampered by the forces of gravity.

== Biography and early work ==
Jacopo Carucci was born at Pontorme (then known as Pontormo or Puntormo), near Empoli, to Bartolomeo di Jacopo di Martino Carrucci and Alessandra di Pasquale di Zanobi. Vasari relates how the orphaned boy, "young, solitary, and melancholy", was shuttled around as a young apprentice.

Jacopo had not been many months in Florence before Bernardo Vettori sent him to stay with Leonardo da Vinci, and then with Mariotto Albertinelli, Piero di Cosimo, and finally, in 1512, with Andrea del Sarto, with whom he did not remain long, for after he had done the cartoons for the arch of the Servites, it does not seem that Andrea bore him any good will, whatever the cause may have been.

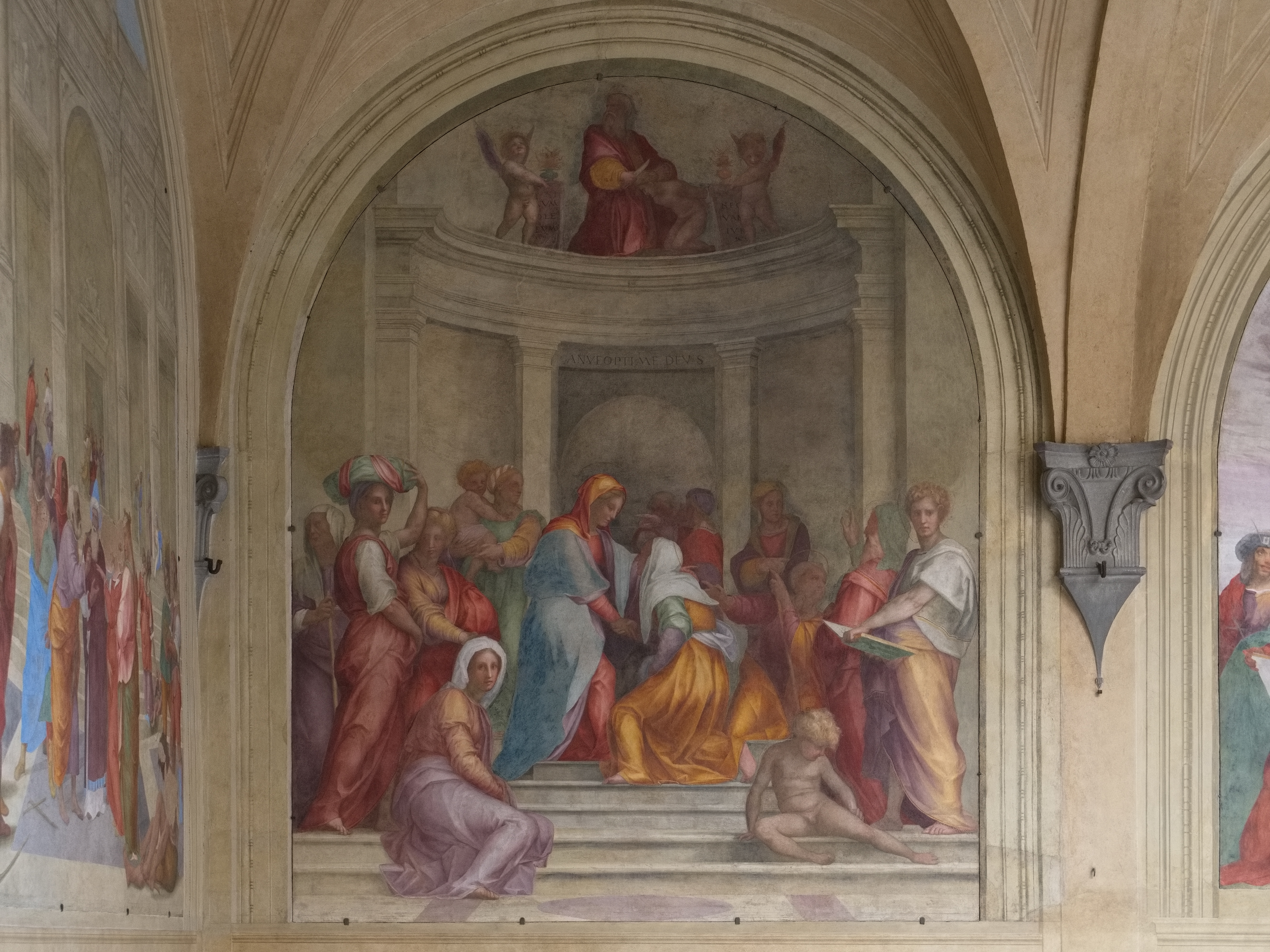
Visitation, 1514–16, fresco, 392 × 337 cm, Chiostrino dei Voti, SS. Annunziata, Florence

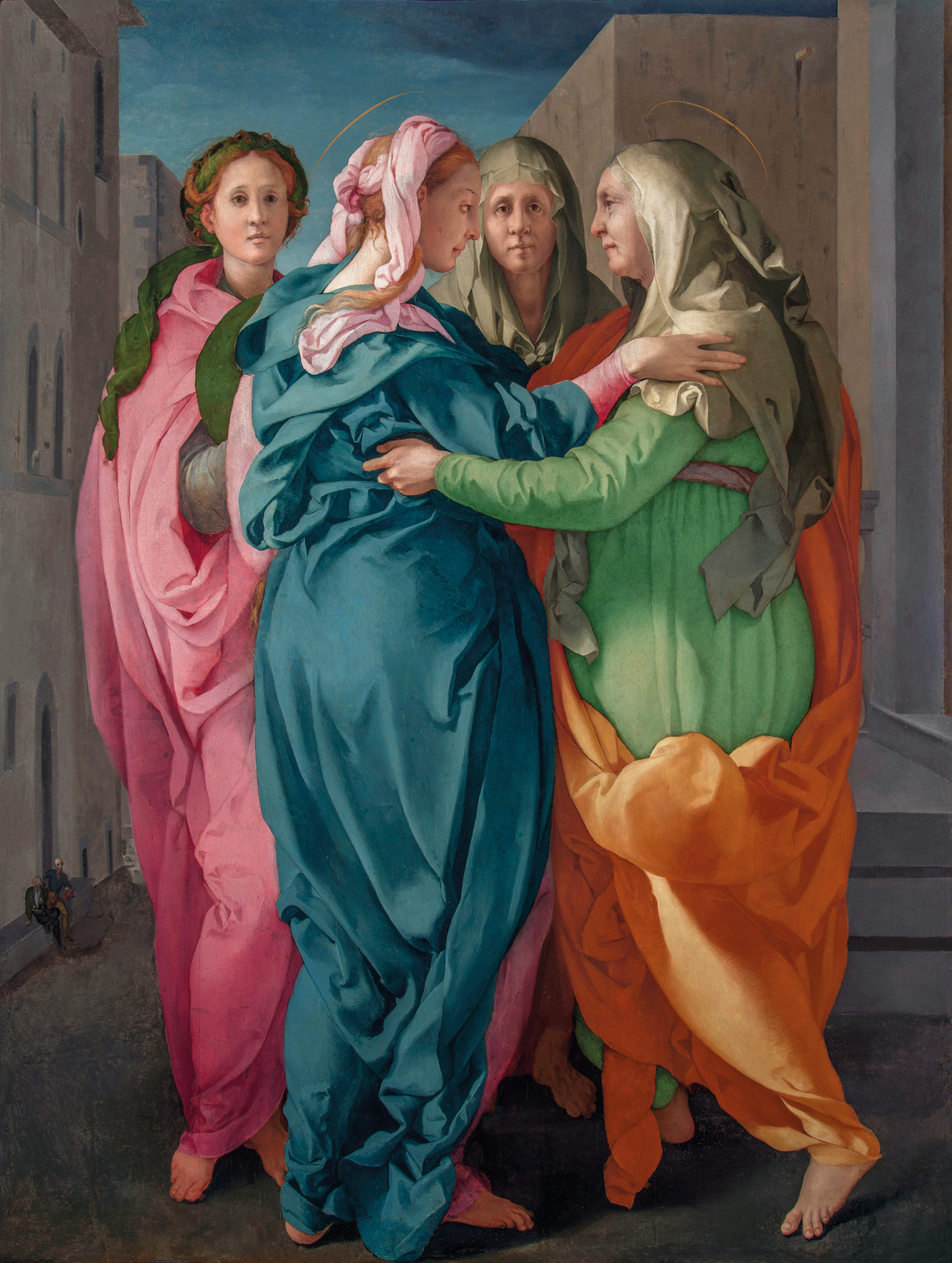
Visitation, 1528–29, San Michele e San Francesco, Carmignano

Pontormo painted in and around Florence, often supported by Medici patronage. A foray to Rome, largely to see Michelangelo's work, influenced his later style. Haunted faces and elongated bodies are characteristic of his work. An example of Pontormo's early style is a fresco depicting the Visitation of the Virgin and St Elizabeth, with its animated but stable composition, painted from 1514 to 1516.

This early Visitation makes a contrast with his painting of the same subject which was done about a decade later, now housed in the parish church of St. Michael Archangel in Carmignano, about 20 km west of Florence. Placing these two pictures together—one from his early style, and another from his mature period—throws Pontormo's artistic development into sharp relief. In the earlier work, Pontormo is much closer in style to his teacher, Andrea del Sarto, and to the early sixteenth-century renaissance artistic principles. For example, the figures stand at just under half the height of the overall picture, and though a bit more crowded than true high renaissance balance would prefer, at least are placed in a classicizing architectural setting at a comfortable distance from the viewer. In the later work, the viewer is brought almost uncomfortably close to the Virgin and St. Elizabeth, who drift toward each other in clouds of drapery. Moreover, the clear architectural setting that is carefully constructed in the earlier piece has been completely abandoned in favor of a peculiar nondescript urban setting.

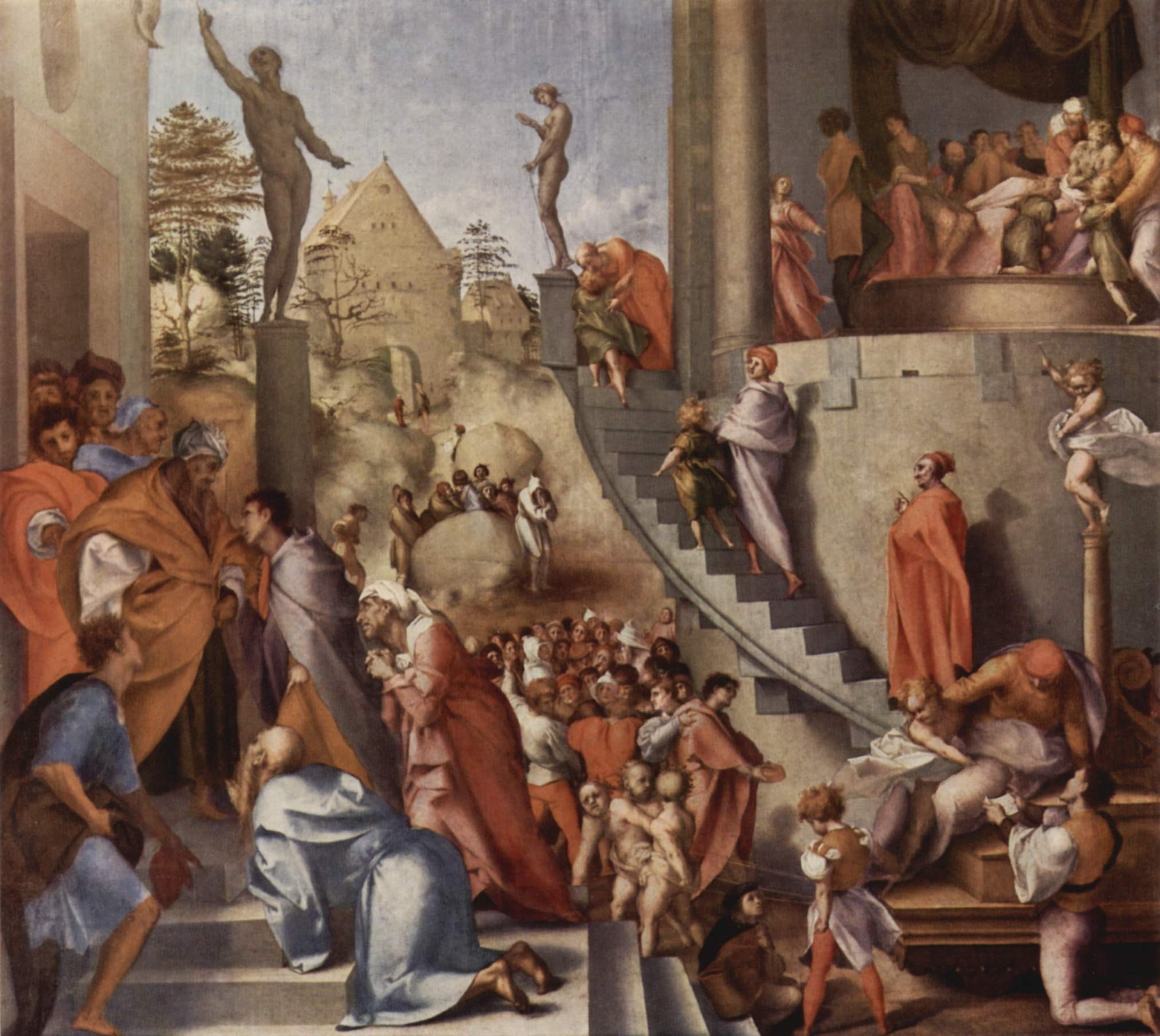
Joseph in Egypt, 1515–1518; Oil on wood; 96 x 109 cm; National Gallery, London

The Joseph panels (now in the National Gallery, London) offer another example of Pontormo's developing style. Done around the same time as the earlier Visitation, these works (such as Joseph in Egypt, at left) show a much more Mannerist leaning. According to Giorgio Vasari, the sitter for the boy seated on a step is his young apprentice, Bronzino.

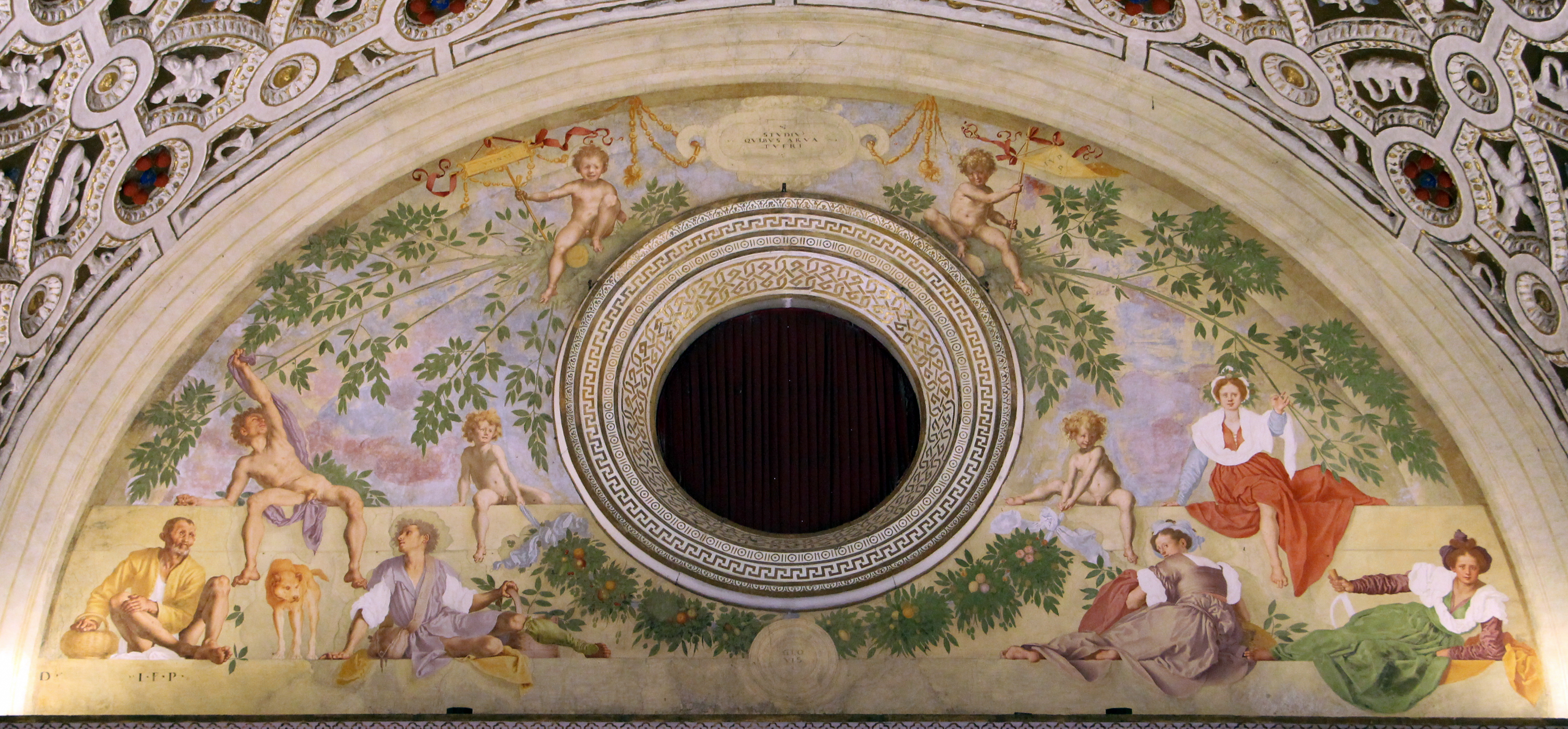
Lunette of Vertumnus and Pomona, 1520–21

In the years between the SS Annunziata and San Michele Visitations, Pontormo took part in the fresco decoration of the salon of the Medici country villa at Poggio a Caiano (1519–20), 17 km NNW of Florence. There he painted frescoes in a pastoral genre style, very uncommon for Florentine painters; their subject was the obscure classical myth of Vertumnus and Pomona in a lunette.

In 1522, when the plague broke out in Florence, Pontormo left for the Certosa di Galluzzo, a cloistered Carthusian monastery where the monks followed vows of silence. He painted a series of frescoes, now quite damaged, on the passion and resurrection of Christ. These frescoes reveal especially strongly the influence of Albrecht Dürer's engravings, which often provided inspiration to Pontormo after he returned to Florence.

== Main works in Florence ==
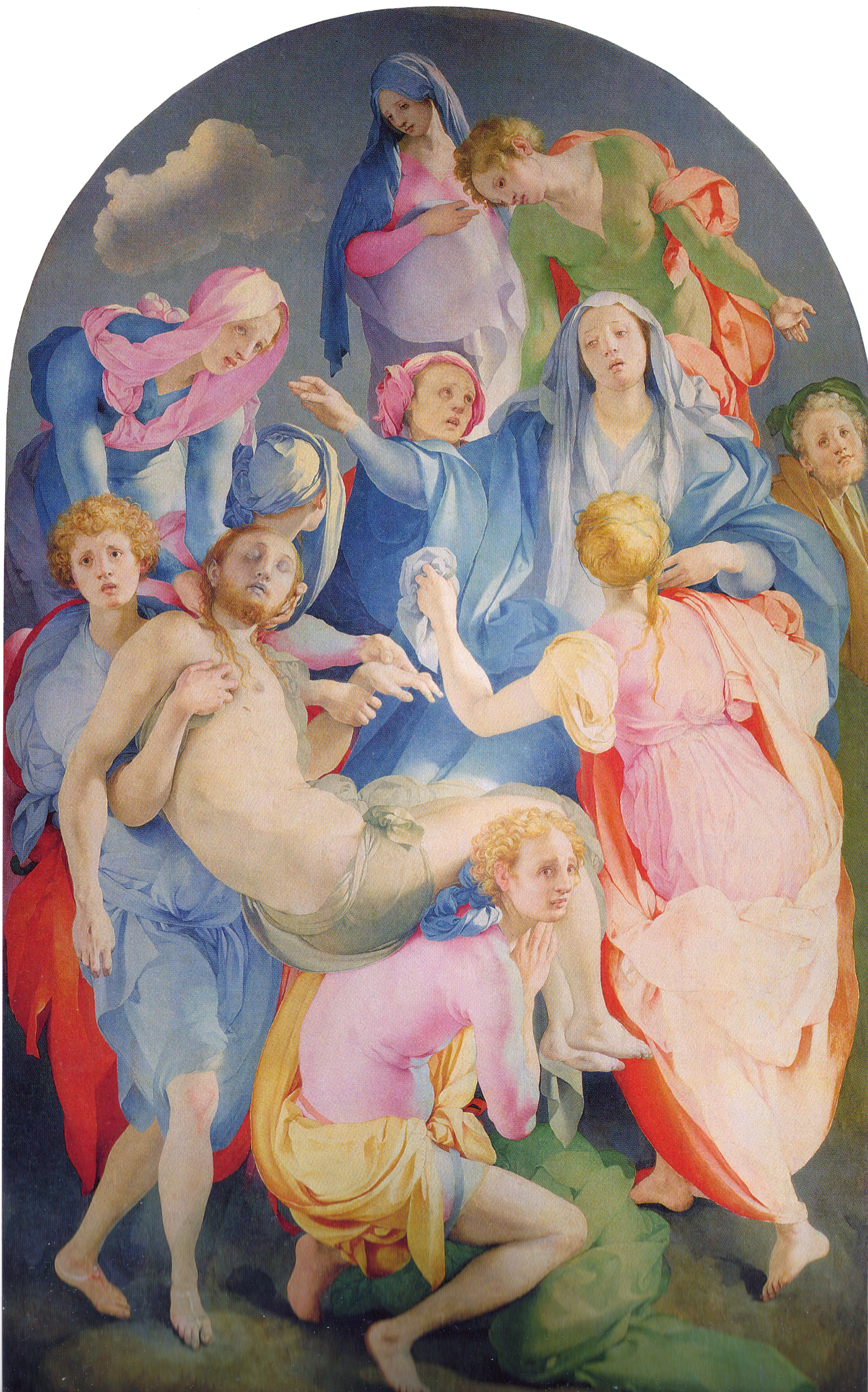
The Deposition from the Cross, 1525–1528

The large altarpiece canvas for the Brunelleschi-designed Capponi Chapel in the church of Santa Felicita, Florence, portraying The Deposition from the Cross (1528), is generally considered to be Pontormo's surviving masterpiece.

The figures, with their sharply modelled forms and brilliant colours, are united in an enormously complex, swirling ovular composition, housed by a shallow, somewhat flattened space. Although commonly known as The Deposition from the Cross, there is no actual cross in the picture. The scene might more properly be called a Lamentation or Bearing the Body of Christ. Those who are lowering (or supporting) Christ appear as anguished as the mourners. Though they are bearing the weight of a full-grown man, they barely seem to be touching the ground; the lower figure in particular balances delicately and implausibly on his front two toes. These two boys have sometimes been interpreted as angels, carrying Christ in his journey to Heaven. In this case, the subject of the picture would be more akin to an Entombment, though the lack of any discernible tomb disrupts that theory, just as the lack of cross poses a problem for the Deposition interpretation. Finally, it has also been noted that the positions of Christ and the Virgin seem to echo those of Michelangelo's Pietà in Rome, though here in the Deposition mother and son have been separated. Thus in addition to elements of a Lamentation and Entombment, this picture carries hints of a Pietà. It has been speculated that the bearded figure in the background at the far right is a self-portrait of Pontormo as Joseph of Arimathea. Another unique feature of this particular Deposition is the empty space occupying the central pictorial plane as all the Biblical personages seem to fall back from this point. It has been suggested that this emptiness may be a physical representation of the Virgin Mary's emotional emptiness at the prospect of losing her son.

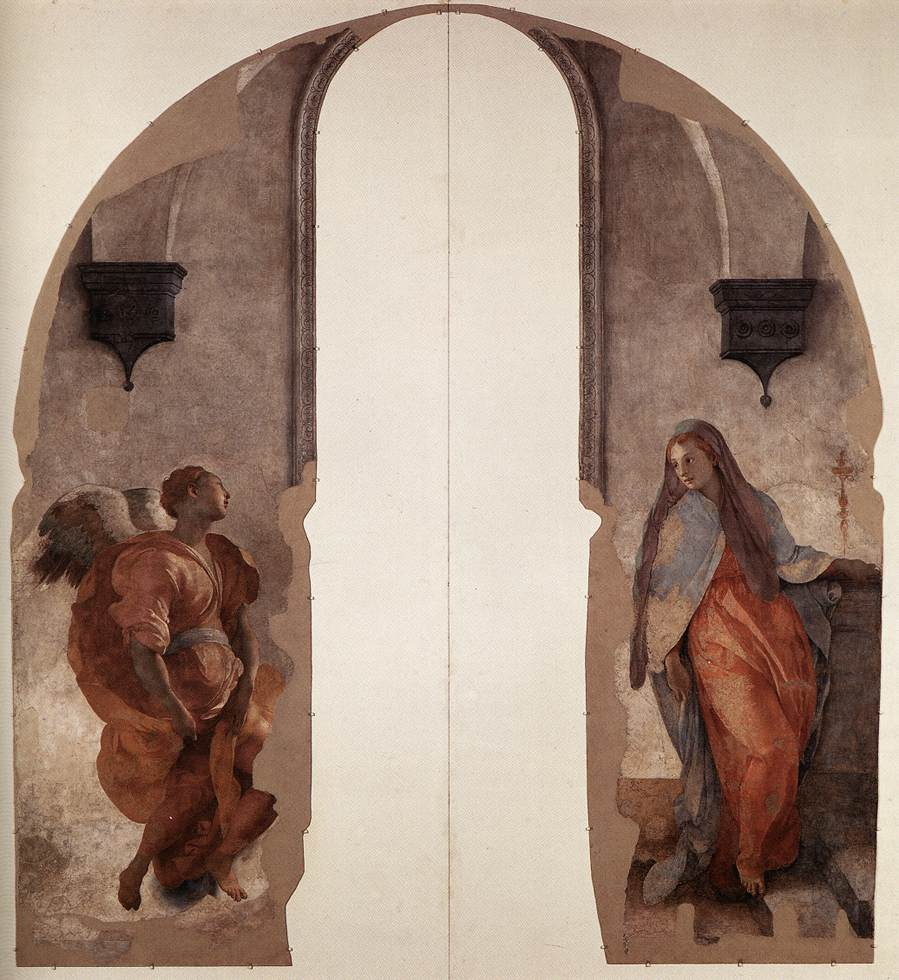
The Annunciation, fresco

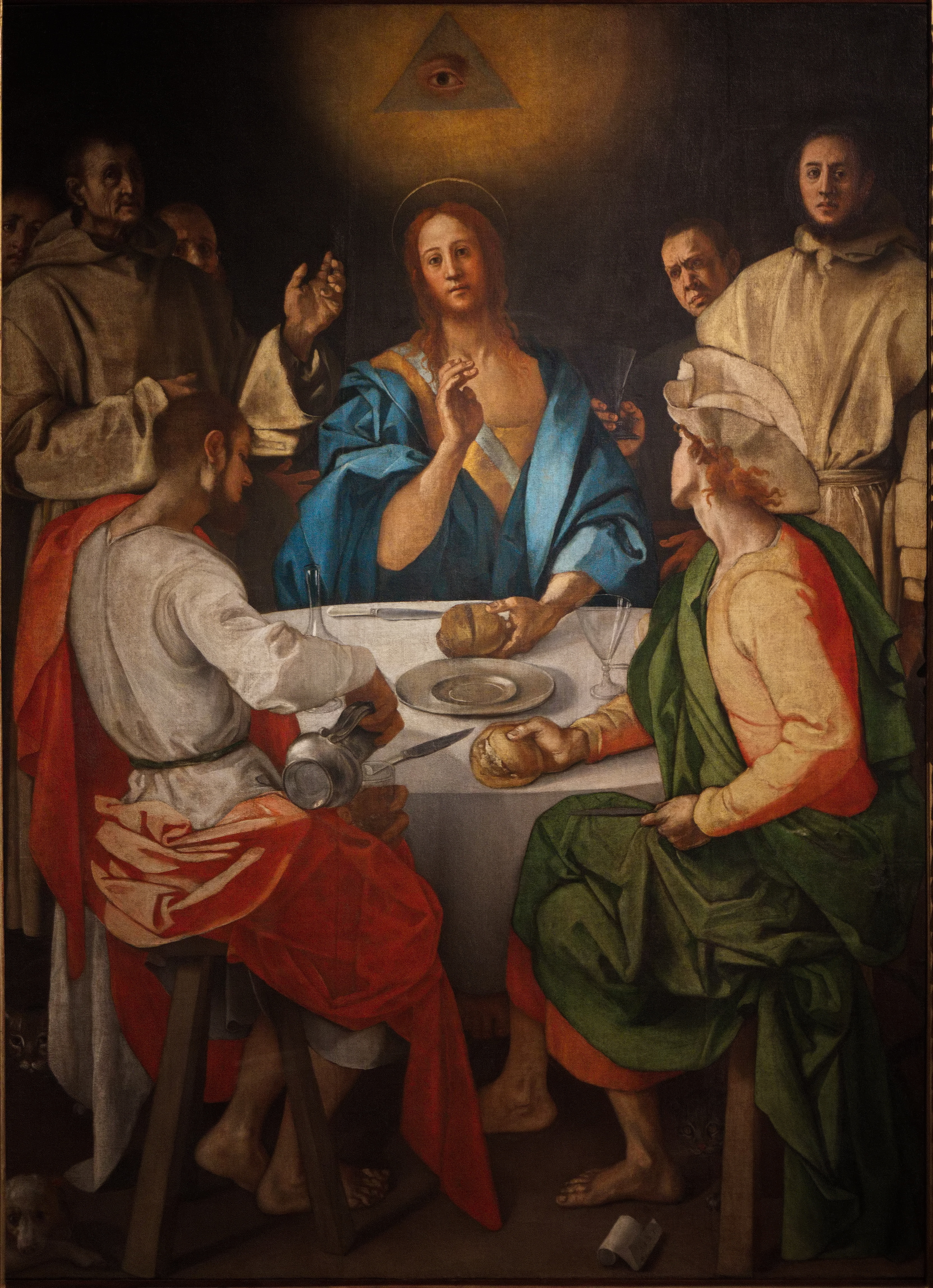
Supper at Emmaus, 1525, Uffizi, Florence

On the wall to the right of the Deposition, Pontormo frescoed an Annunciation scene. As with the Deposition, the artist's primary attention is on the figures themselves rather than their setting. Placed against white walls, the Angel Gabriel and Virgin Mary are presented in an environment that is so simplified as to almost seem stark. The fictive architectural details above each of them, are painted to resemble the gray stone pietra serena that adorns the interior of Santa Felicità, thus uniting their painted space with the viewer's actual space. The startling contrast between the figures and ground makes their brilliant garments almost seem to glow in the light of the window between them, against the stripped-down background, as if the couple miraculously appeared in an extension of the chapel wall. The Annunciation resembles his above-mentioned Visitation in the church of San Michele at Carmignano in both the style and swaying postures.

Vasari tells us that the cupola was originally painted with God the Father and Four Patriarchs. The decoration in the dome of the chapel is now lost, but four roundels with the Evangelists still adorn the pendentives, worked on by both Pontormo and his chief pupil Agnolo Bronzino. The two artists collaborated so closely that specialists dispute which roundels each of them painted.

This tumultuous oval of figures took three years for Pontormo to complete. According to Vasari, because Pontormo desired above all to "do things his own way without being bothered by anyone," the artist screened off the chapel so as to prevent interfering opinions. Vasari continues, "And so, having painted it in his own way without any of his friends being able to point anything out to him, it was finally uncovered and seen with astonishment by all of Florence..."

A number of Pontormo's other works have also remained in Florence; the Uffizi Gallery holds his mystical Supper at Emmaus as well as portraits. Many of Pontormo's well-known canvases, such as the early Joseph in Egypt series (c. 1515) and the later Martyrdom of St Maurice and the Theban Legion (c. 1531) depict crowds milling about in extreme contrapposto of greatly varied positions.

== Lost or damaged works ==
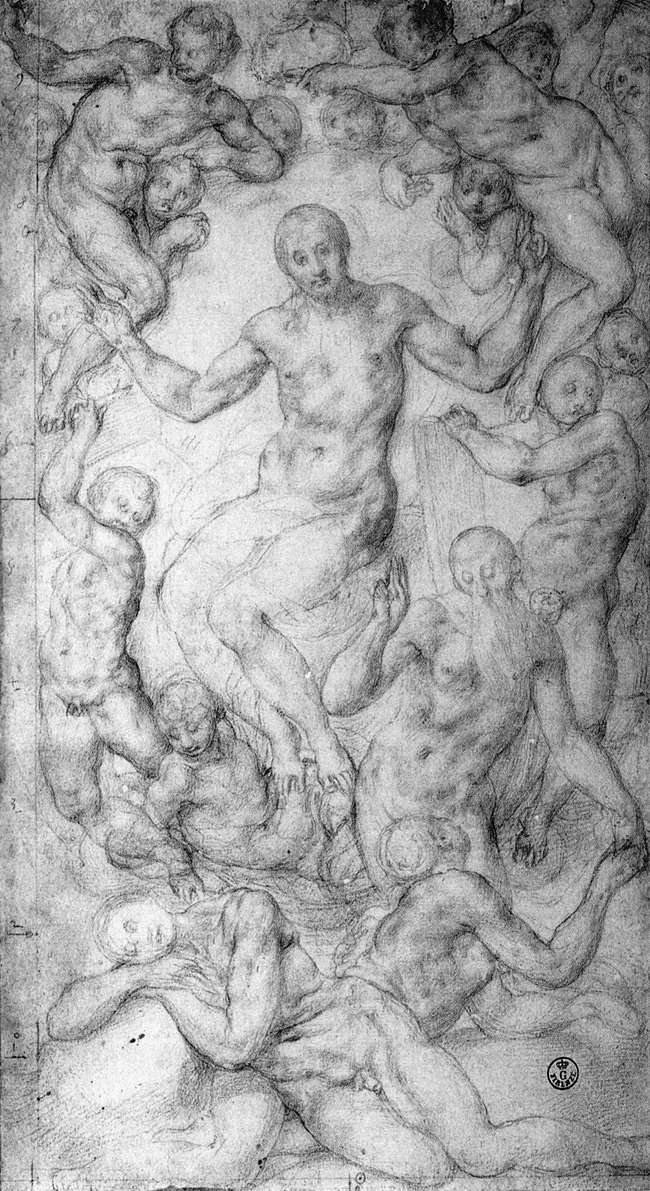
Christ and Creation of Eve

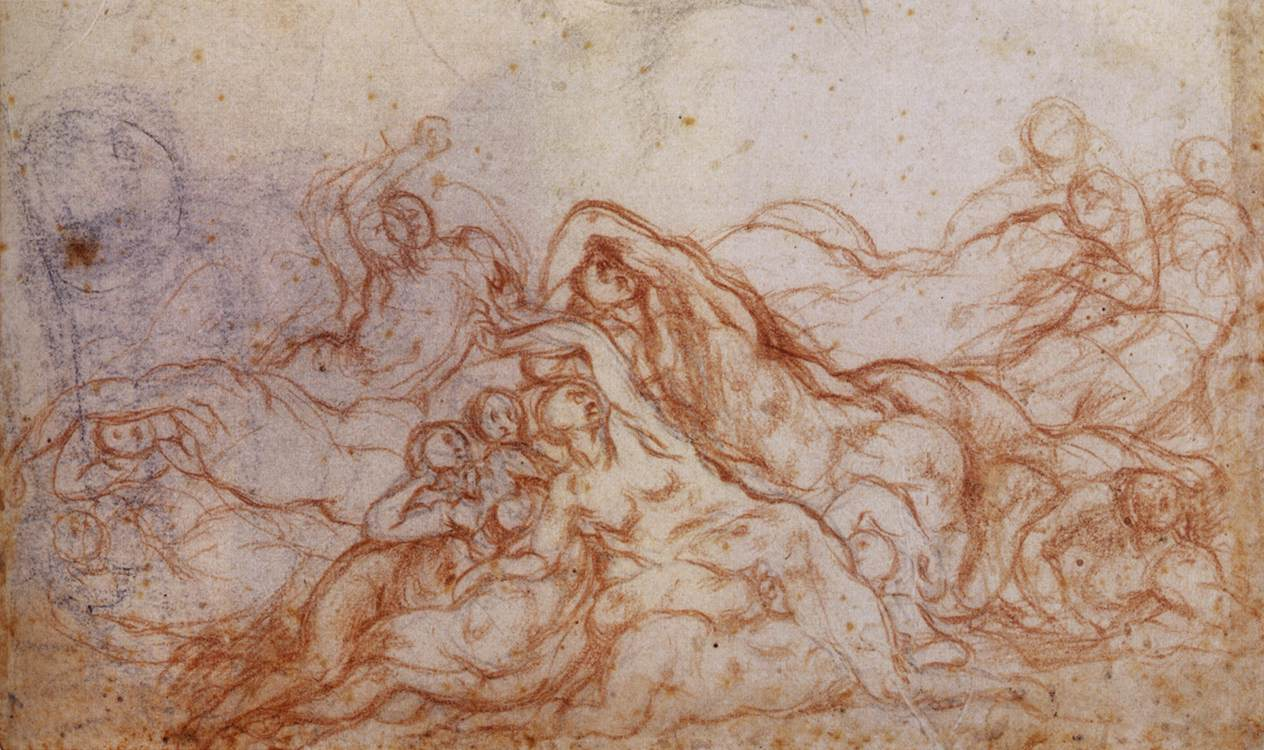
Study for Deluge

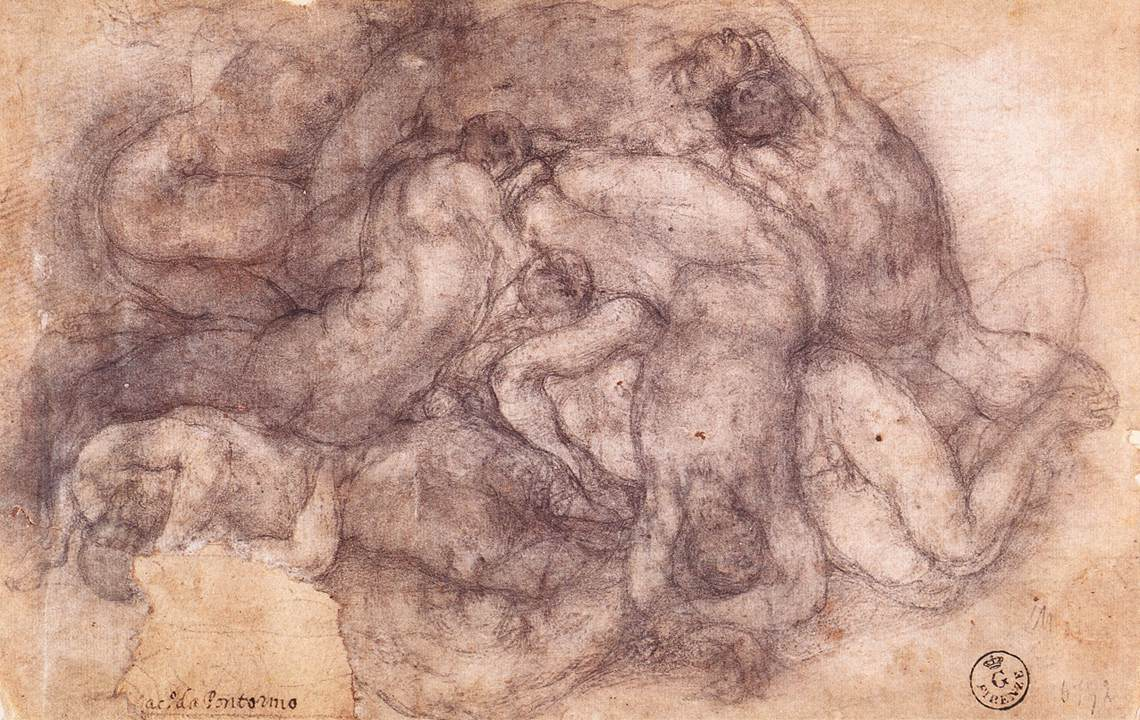
Dead in Last Judgment

Many of Pontormo's works have been damaged, including the lunettes for the cloister in the Carthusian monastery of Galluzo. They now are displayed indoors, although in their damaged state.

Perhaps most tragic is the loss of the unfinished frescoes for the choir of the Basilica of San Lorenzo, Florence which consumed the last decade of his life. His frescoes depicted a Last Judgment day composed of an unsettling morass of writhing figures. The remaining drawings, showing a bizarre and mystical ribboning of bodies, have an almost hallucinatory effect. Florentine figure painting had mainly stressed linear and sculptural figures. For example, the Christ in Michelangelo's Last Judgment in the Sistine Chapel is a massive painted block, stern in his wrath; by contrast, Pontormo's Jesus in the Last Judgment twists sinuously, as if rippling through the heavens in the dance of ultimate finality. Angels swirl about him in even more serpentine poses. If Pontormo's work from the 1520s seemed to float in a world little touched by gravitational force, the Last Judgment figures seem to have escaped it altogether and flail through rarefied air.

In his Last Judgment, Pontormo went against pictorial and theological tradition by placing God the Father at the feet of Christ, instead of above him, an idea Vasari found deeply disturbing:

But I have never been able to understand the significance of this scene, ... I mean, what he could have intended to signify in that part where there is Christ on high, raising the dead, and below His feet is God the Father, who is creating Adam and Eve. Besides this, in one of the corners, where are the four Evangelists, nude, with books in their hands, it does not seem to me that in a single place did he give a thought to any order of composition, or measurement, or time, or variety in the heads, or diversity in the flesh-colours, or, in a word, to any rule, proportion or law of perspective, for the whole work is full of nude figures with an order, design, invention, composition, colouring, and painting contrived after his own fashion ...

== Critical assessment and legacy ==
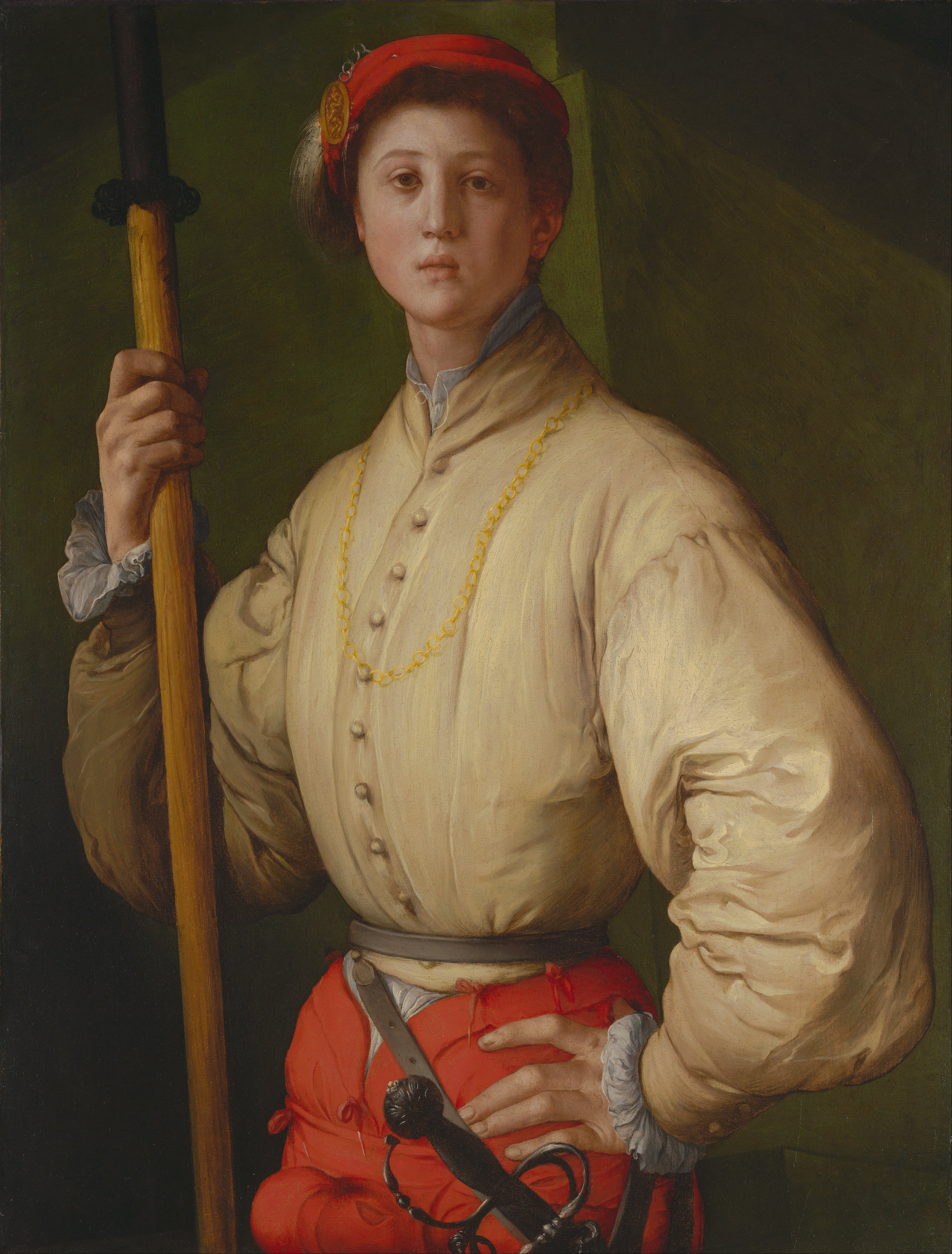
Portrait of a Halberdier, 1528–1530, oil on canvas, J. Paul Getty Museum, Los Angeles

Vasari's Life of Pontormo depicts him as withdrawn and steeped in neurosis while at the centre of the artists and patrons of his lifetime. This image of Pontormo has tended to colour the popular conception of the artist, as seen in the film of Giovanni Fago, Pontormo, a heretical love. Fago portrays Pontormo as mired in a lonely and ultimately paranoid dedication to his final Last Judgment project, which he often kept shielded from onlookers. Yet as the art historian Elizabeth Pilliod has pointed out, Vasari was in fierce competition with the Pontormo/Bronzino workshop at the time when he was writing his Lives of the Most Excellent Painters, Sculptors, and Architects. This professional rivalry between the two bottegas could well have provided Vasari with ample motivation for running down the artistic lineage of his opponent for Medici patronage.

Perhaps as a result of Vasari's derision, or perhaps because of the vagaries of aesthetic taste, Pontormo's work was quite out of fashion for several centuries. The fact that so much of his work has been lost or severely damaged is a testament to this neglect, though he has received renewed attention from contemporary art historians. Indeed, between 1989 and 2002, Pontormo's Portrait of a Halberdier (at right), held the title of the world's most expensive painting by an Old Master.

Regardless of the veracity of Vasari's account, it is certainly true that Pontormo's artistic idiosyncrasies produced a style that few were able (or willing) to imitate, with the exception of his closest pupil Bronzino. Bronzino's early work is so close to that of his teacher, that the authorship of several paintings from the 1520s and '30s is still under dispute—for example, the four tondi containing the Evangelists in the Capponi Chapel.

Pontormo shares some of the mannerism of Rosso Fiorentino and of Parmigianino. In some ways, he anticipated the Baroque as well as the tensions of El Greco. His eccentricities also resulted in an original sense of composition. At best, his compositions are cohesive. The figures in the Deposition, for example, appear to sustain each other: removal of any one of them would cause the edifice to collapse. In other works, as in the Joseph canvases, the crowding makes for a confusing pictorial melee. It is in the later drawings that we see a graceful fusion of bodies in a composition which includes the oval frame of Jesus in the Last Judgement.

== Anthology of works ==
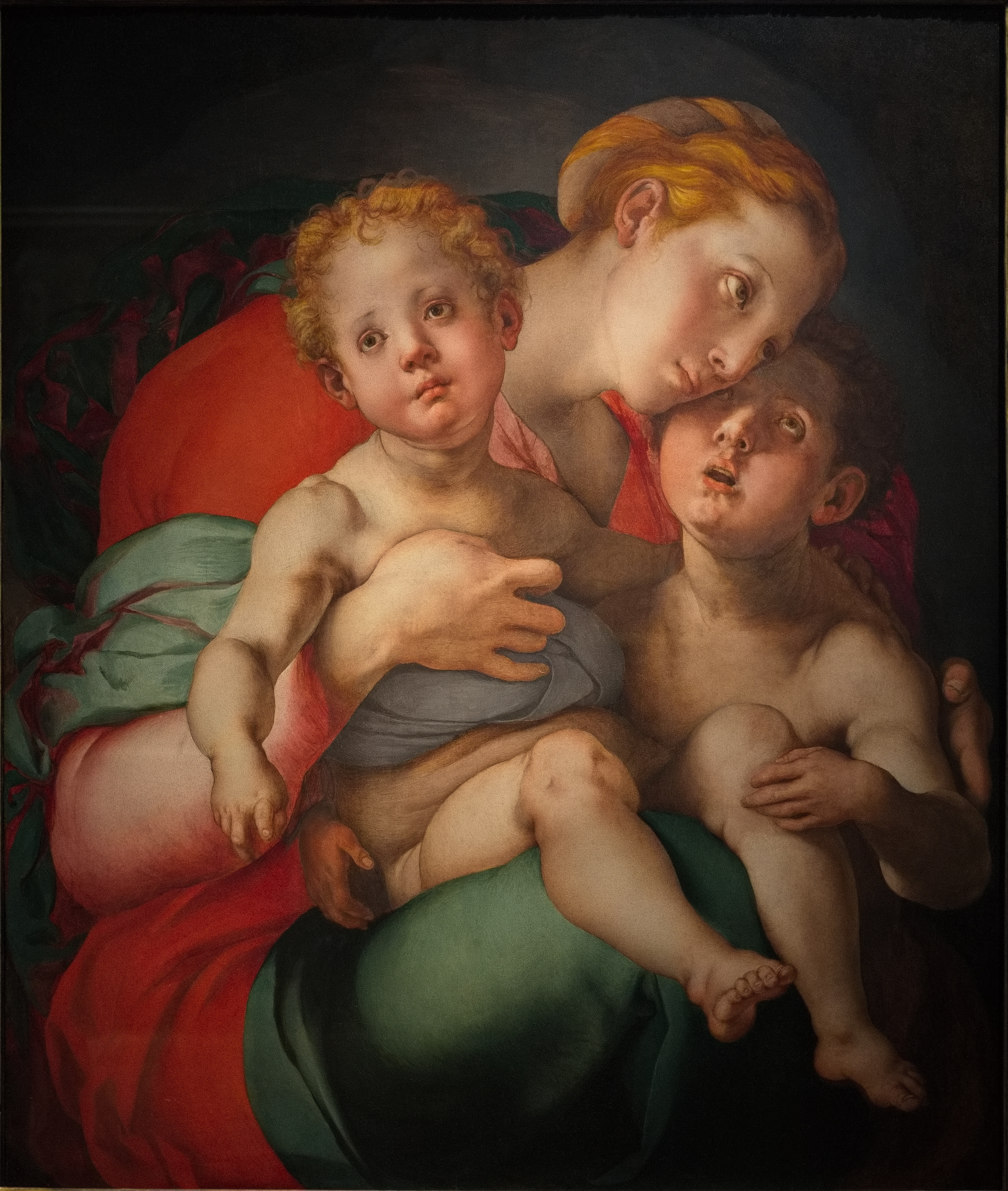
Madonna and Child with Young John the Baptist, 1534, Uffizi

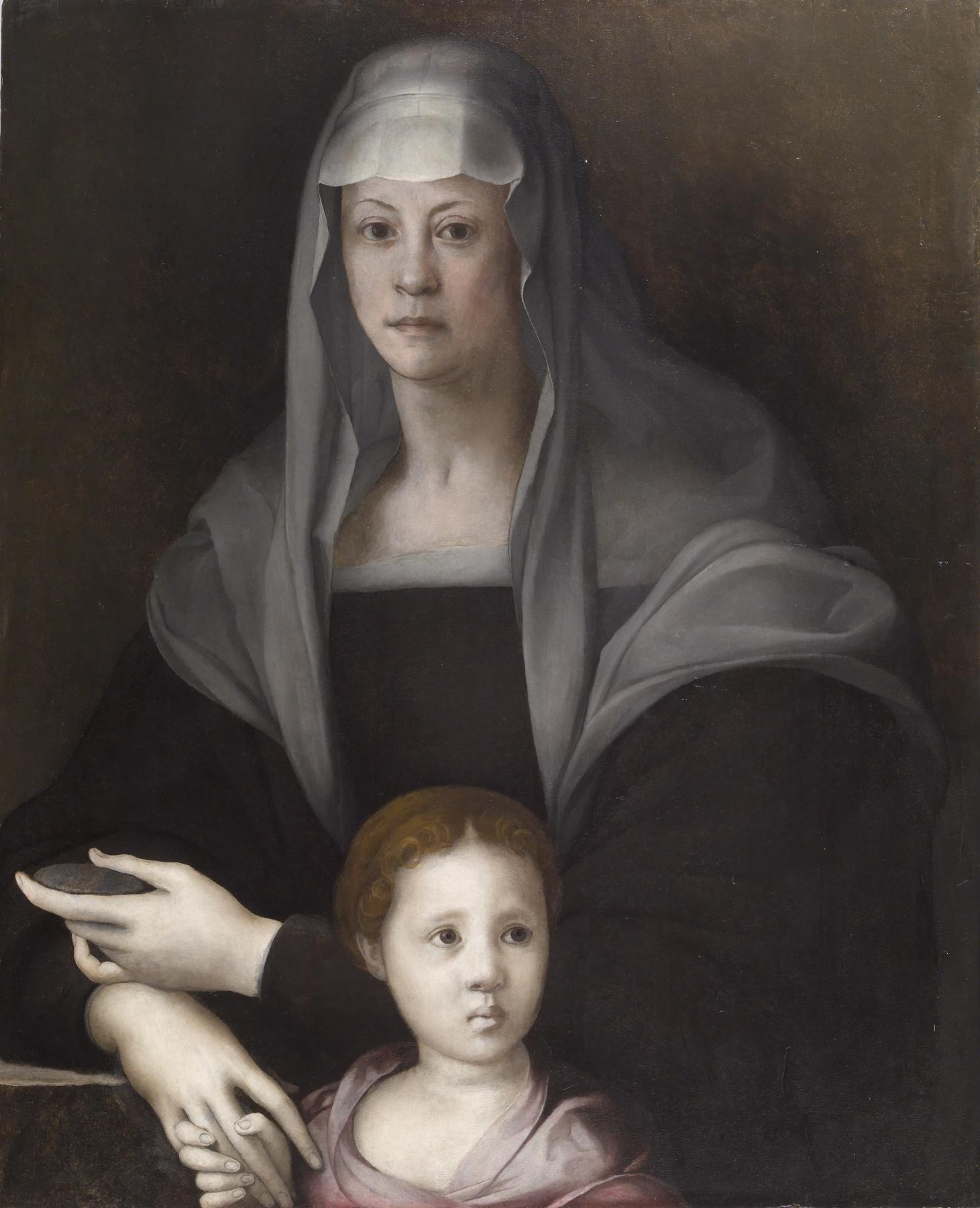
Portrait of Maria Salviati, the wife of famous military leader Giovanni delle Bande Nere de' Medici, and Giulia, a Medici relative who was left in Maria's care after the murder of the child's father, 1543–1545, Walters Art Museum

=== Early works (until 1521) ===
Painting	Date	Site	Link
Leda and the Swan (uncertain attribution)	1512–1513	Uffizi Gallery, Florence	
Apollo and Daphne	1513	Bowdoin College Museum of Art, Brunswick, Maine	
Holy Conversation	1514	San Luca Chapel, Santissima Annunziata, Florence	
Madonna and Child with the Infant St John the Baptist	c. 1514	Whitfield Fine Art, London	
Episode of Hospital Life	1514	Accademia, Florence	
Veronica and the Image	1515	Medici Chapel, Santa Maria Novella, Florence	
Visitation	1514–1516	Santissima Annunziata, Florence	
Lady with Basket of Spindles (attributed to Andrea del Sarto)	1516–1517	Uffizi Gallery, Florence	
Marriage bedchamber panels for Pier Francesco Borgherini. (Two others by Francesco Bacchiacca)			
Joseph reveals himself to his brothers	1516–1517	National Gallery, London	
Joseph Sold to Potiphar	1516–1517	National Gallery, London	
Joseph's Brothers Beg for Help	1515	National Gallery, London	
Pharaoh with his Butler and Baker	1516–1517	National Gallery, London	
Joseph in Egypt	1517–1518	National Gallery, London	
*St. Quentin (Also attributed to Giovanni Maria Pichi)	1517	Pinacoteca comunale, Sansepolcro	
Portrait of Furrier	1517–1518	Louvre, Paris	
St Jerome & St Francis	1518	Whitfield Fine Art, London	
Pucci Altarpiece	1518	San Michele Visdomini, Florence	
Portrait of Musician	1518–1519	Uffizi Gallery, Florence	
St Anthony Abbott	1518–1519	Uffizi Gallery, Florence	
Portrait of Cosimo the Elder	1518–1519	Uffizi Gallery, Florence	
John the Evangelist & the Archangel Gabriel	1519	Church of S. Michele, Empoli	
Adoration of the Magi	1519–1521	Palazzo Pitti, Florence	
Vertumnus and Pomona	1519–1521	Villa Medici, Poggio a Caiano	
Study of Man's Head (Drawing)		Metropolitan Museum of Art, New York City	
Portrait of Gentleman with book and gloves	1540-1541	Cerruti Collection, Castello di Rivoli Museo d’Arte Contemporanea, Rivoli- Turin	

=== Mature works (1522–30) ===
Painting	Date	Site	Link
Mary and Child with Four Saints	1520–1530	Metropolitan Museum, New York City	
Portrait of two friends	c. 1522	Fondazione Giorgio Cini, Venice	
Madonna with Child & Two Saints (Bronzino?)	c. 1522	Uffizi Gallery, Florence	
Holy Family with St John	1522–1524	Hermitage Museum, St Petersburg	
Madonna with Child & St John (Attributed to Rosso Fiorentino)	1523–1525	Uffizi Gallery, Florence	
Prayer in Gesthemane (copies by Jacopo da Empoli)	1523–1525	Certosa di Galluzzo	
Walk to Calvary	1523–1525	Certosa di Galluzo	
Christ before Pilate	1523–1525	Certosa di Galluzzo	
Deposition	1523–1525	Certosa di Galluzzo	
Resurrection	1523–1525	Certosa di Galluzzo	
Supper in Emmaus	1525	Uffizi Gallery, Florence	
Study of a Carthusian Monk (Drawing)	1525	Uffizi Gallery, Florence	
Madonna and child & two angels	1525	San Francisco Museum of Art, San Francisco	
Portrait of young man in pink	1525–1526	Pinacoteca Communale, Lucca	
Tabernacle of San Giuliano, Boldrone, Crucifix with Madonna & St. John, and Sant'Agostino	1525–1526	Accademia, Florence	
Birth of St. John Baptist	1526	Uffizi Gallery, Florence	
Penitent Saint Jerome	1526–1527	Lower Saxony State Museum, Hanover	
Madonna with Child & St John (Bronzino?)	1526–1528	Palazzo Corsini, Florence	
Madonna with Child & St John	1527–1528	Uffizi Gallery, Florence	
Matthew, Luke, & John (Mark painted by Bronzino)	1525–1526	Santa Felicita, Capponi Chapel, Florence.	
Deposition	1526–1528	Santa Felicita, Capponi Chapel, Florence.	
Annunciation	1527–1528	Santa Felicita, Capponi Chapel, Florence	
Portrait of Francesca Capponi, as St. Mary Magdalen	1527–1528	Whitfield Fine Art, London	
Visitation	1528–1529	Church of San Francesco e Michele, Carmignano	
Virgin and Child with Saint Anne and Four Saints	1528–1529	Louvre Museum, Paris	
Portrait of a Halberdier	1528–1530	J. Paul Getty Museum, Los Angeles	
The Ten Thousand Martyrs	1529–1530	Palazzo Pitti, Florence	
Portrait of a man in a red cap	1530	National Gallery, London	

=== Late works (after 1530) ===
Painting	Date	Site	Link
Martyrdom of San Maurizio and the Theban Legions (Pontormo & Bronzino)	1531	Uffizi Gallery, Florence	
Noli me Tangere (Bronzino?)	1531	Casa Buonarroti, Florence	
Portrait of lady in red with puppy, (Bronzino?)	1532–1533	Städelsches Kunstinstitut, Frankfurt	
Venus and Cupid	1532–1534	Galleria dell'Accademia, Florence	
Portrait of Alessandro de' Medici	before December 1535	Philadelphia Museum of Art, Philadelphia	
Portrait of Alessandro de' Medici	c. 1534–1535	Art Institute of Chicago, Chicago	
Expulsion of Adam and Eve	c. 1535	Uffizi Gallery, Florence	
Study for the Three Graces (Drawing)	1535	Uffizi Gallery, Florence	
Portrait of Maria Salviati de' Medici and Giulia de' Medici (Painting)	c. 1539	Walters Art Museum, Baltimore	
Portrait of Niccolò Ardinghelli		National Gallery, Washington, D.C.	
Portrait of Maria Salviati	1543–1545	Uffizi Gallery, Florence	
Sacrificial Scene	c. 1545	Capodimonte Museum, Naples	
My Book (Pontormo's Diary)	1554–1556	National Library, Florence	
Portrait of Pontormo (Bronzino)			
St. Francis (Drawing)		Museum of Fine Arts, Boston	
San Lorenzo (Fresco cartoons)			

== See also ==
- Lost artworks
