= Saint John the Evangelist and Michael the Archangel =

Painting by Pontormo

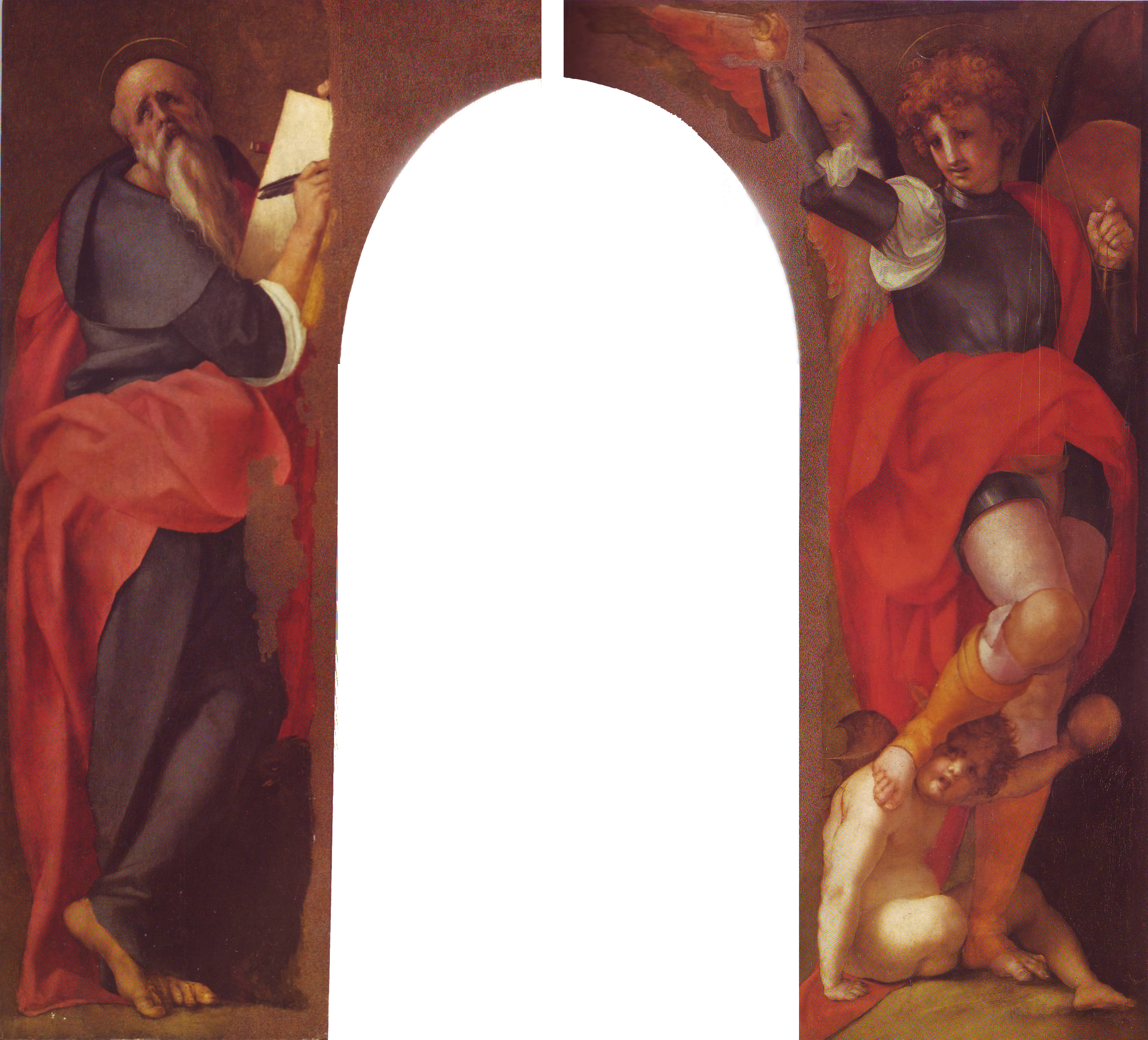
Saint John the Evangelist and Michael the Archangel (1518) by Pontormo

Saint John the Evangelist and Michael the Archangel form a pair of 1518 oil on panel paintings by Pontormo. Each work was originally rectangular in format - the round opening was added in 1737 to accommodate a shrine with a crucifix. They hang in the church of San Michele Arcangelo in Pontormo in the artist's birthplace of Pontorme and may have originally been produced for its cappella del Crocifisso.
