= Virgin and Child with the Infant John the Baptist (Botticelli, São Paulo) =

Painting by Sandro Botticelli and his studio

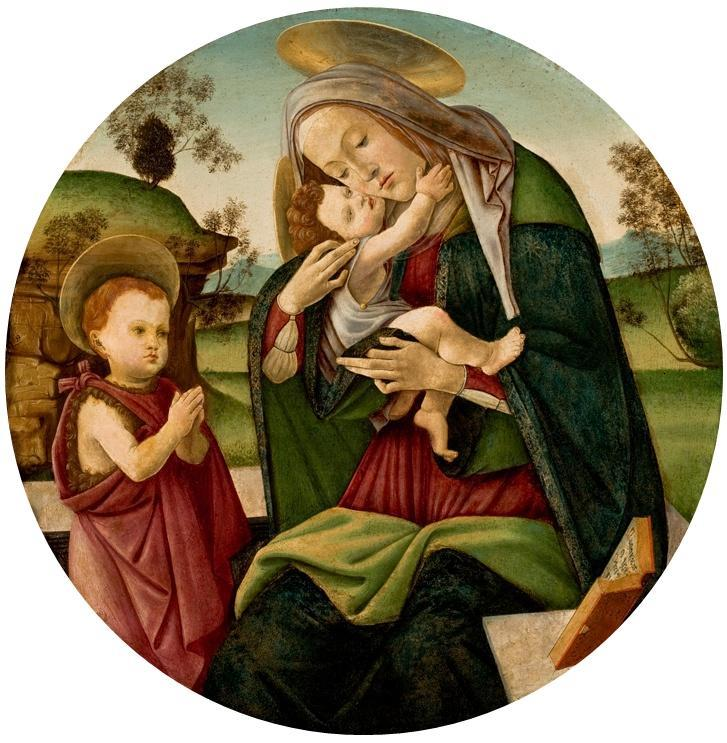
- Artist: Sandro Botticelli
- Year: c. 1490–1500
- Medium: Tempera on panel
- Dimensions: 74 cm diameter (29 in)
- Location: São Paulo Museum of Art

The Virgin and Child with the Infant Saint John the Baptist is a painting in tempera on wood executed by the Italian Renaissance master Sandro Botticelli and his studio (Bartolomeo di Giovanni or Raffaelino de' Carli). The tondo, painted in Florence between the years 1490 and 1500, addresses a central theme of Italian Renaissance art: the divine motherhood. The work is now in the São Paulo Museum of Art.

== Background and iconography ==
The iconography of the Madonna with the Christ Child is one of the most recurrent themes throughout art history. Its origin goes back to the hieratic representations of the High Middle Ages in which Mary, crowned, enthroned or standing, presents the divine infant in her arms. The painters of the Italian Renaissance contributed to the widespread representation of the "Virgin of Tenderness", characterized by a more emotional and humane representation of this theme, rather than the strictly sacred approach given by the Byzantine art. In the words of Marcio Doctors, the Renaissance Madonnas mark "the Renaissance spirit which it characterizes: faith in mankind, as subjectivity, placing it in the center of the world. Both the Renaissance and the maternal love embrace the man in the same way when they make the world revolve around him".

Botticelli produced a large number of Madonnas during the 1480s and 1490s. A considerable number of these took the form of tondi depicting the Virgin, the Christ Child and the infant John the Baptist in worship. The tondi (tondo, singular) were works of art in circular shape (paintings or sculptures), mostly of sacred or historical themes. They were much appreciated in the 15th century and were often ordered by patrons and guilds to decorate palaces or for use as objects of private devotion.

== Painting ==
The painting in São Paulo is unanimously dated in the last decade of the 15th century, based on similarities with other works from this period, in which one perceives a change in the artist's style. We emphasize the beautiful structure of the composition, in which the figures of the Virgin and Child stand boldly inside the tondo, hereby freeing Botticelli from the elegant symmetry of his youth. The same compositional clearance can be noted in the details of the angled seat, upon which rests the book Magnificat, supported on the frame of the painting in an almost illusionistic fashion. It is equally noteworthy the remarkable intensification of the emotional bond that unites Mary and infant Jesus, unusual in Madonnas executed by the painter in his youth.

The Italian art historian Roberto Longhi notes that the drawing of the scene is structured through "cross and radial lines" and not by "arching flexible lines", which places the work in the aforementioned context of freer composition that marks the painter's maturing style in the late 15th century. Antonino Santangelo expresses a similar opinion, noting that the "free and harmonious intertwining of hands and faces, mobility and precision recall the works of Botticelli shortly before 1500".

In fact, it is possible to list at least a dozen works by Botticelli, all of the last decade of the century, similar in composition to the painting in São Paulo, the closest being the tondo in the Clark Art Institute in Williamstown, Massachusetts, which is also dated around 1490.

== Attribution ==
The authorship of the work in question merited a detailed analysis by Roberto Longhi in 1947. In a letter to Pietro Maria Bardi, now in the archives of the São Paulo Museum of Art, the Italian art historian claims that it is possible to observe in the tondo "undoubtedly the hand of Botticelli". His opinion was corroborated by Antonino Santangelo, who stated that "one can recognize the direct intervention on the painting by Botticelli". The attribution to Botticelli was later confirmed by other experts, including Miklos Boskovits and Yukio Yashiro.

Nevertheless, most critics seem to agree that a part of the landscape in the background and the figure of John the Baptist would have been performed by a workshop assistant, based on clear difference in style compared to the figure of the Virgin and Child. Longhi believes that the drawings of the landscape and the infant John the Baptist are more typical of Ghirlandaio and proposes the name of Bartolomeo di Giovanni – a pupil of both painters – as a possible contributor to the execution of the Botticelli tondo. Antonino Santangelo, in turn, attributes the auxiliary figure of Saint John the Baptist to Raffaelino de' Carli.

== Provenance ==
Originally, the work decorated the Palazzo Capponi in Florence, designed by Lorenzo di Bicci in 1410 by order of Niccolò da Uzzano. In the 19th century, the tondo became part of the private collection of the wealthy English merchant Thomas Blayds in Liverpool. Later, it was sold to Lord Wigan, Earl of Crawford and Balcarres, thus remaining in England. On October 2, 1947, the work was acquired by the São Paulo Museum of Art with funds donated by Mrs. Sinha Junqueira, a businesswoman and art patron from Ribeirão Preto.

== See also ==
- List of works by Sandro Botticelli

== Bibliography ==
- Bardi, Pietro Maria. Museu de Arte de São Paulo: Catálogo das pinturas, esculturas e tapeçarias, São Paulo, MASP, 1982.
- Bardi, Pietro Maria. Sodalício com Assis Chateaubriand, São Paulo, MASP, 1963.
- Carlo, Bo, Mandel, Gabriele. L'opera completa di Botticelli, Milan, Rizzoli, 1967.
- Costa, Paulo de Freitas, Doctors, Márcio. Universos Sensíveis: As coleções de Eva e Ema Klabin, São Paulo,GraphBox Caran, 2004.
- Deimling, Barbara (2001). Botticelli. Colone: Taschen.
- Marques, Luiz. "Boletim do Instituto de História da Arte do MASP: Arte italiana em coleções brasileiras, 1250–1950", São Paulo, Lemos Editorial & Gráficos, 1996.
- Marques, Luiz. Catálogo do Museu de Arte de São Paulo Assis Chateaubriand: Arte italiana, São Paulo, Prêmio, 1998, p. 53–56.
- Marques, Luiz. Corpus da Arte Italiana em Coleções Brasileiras, 1250–1950: A arte italiana no Museu de Arte de São Paulo, São Paulo, Berlendis e Vertecchia, 1996, p. 49–52.
- Yashiro, Yukio. Sandro Botticelli, London, The Medici Society, 1925.
