= Saint Anthony and Saint Stephen =

Painting by Bicci di Lorenzo

Saint Anthony and Saint Stephen is a painting by the Florentine painter and sculptor Bicci di Lorenzo, son of Florentine painter Neri di Bicci, between 1400 and 1450 in the city of Florence. It shows Saint Anthony of Padua and Saint Stephen. It is in tempera and gilded on a poplar panel, a medium he used for many of his religious paintings including the painting of Saint John the Baptist and Saint Miniato in the same museum. They are probably cut from the same large polyptych altarpiece. The rocks on the head of Saint Stephen signifies his martyrdom for being stoned to death by a Jewish assembly; he criticized Jewish teachings.

It is displayed at the Legion of Honor Museum in San Francisco, California.
