= Oratory of Sant'Antonio Abate, Pescia =

Building in Pescia, Italy

Coordinates: 43°54′12.73″N 10°41′27.84″E

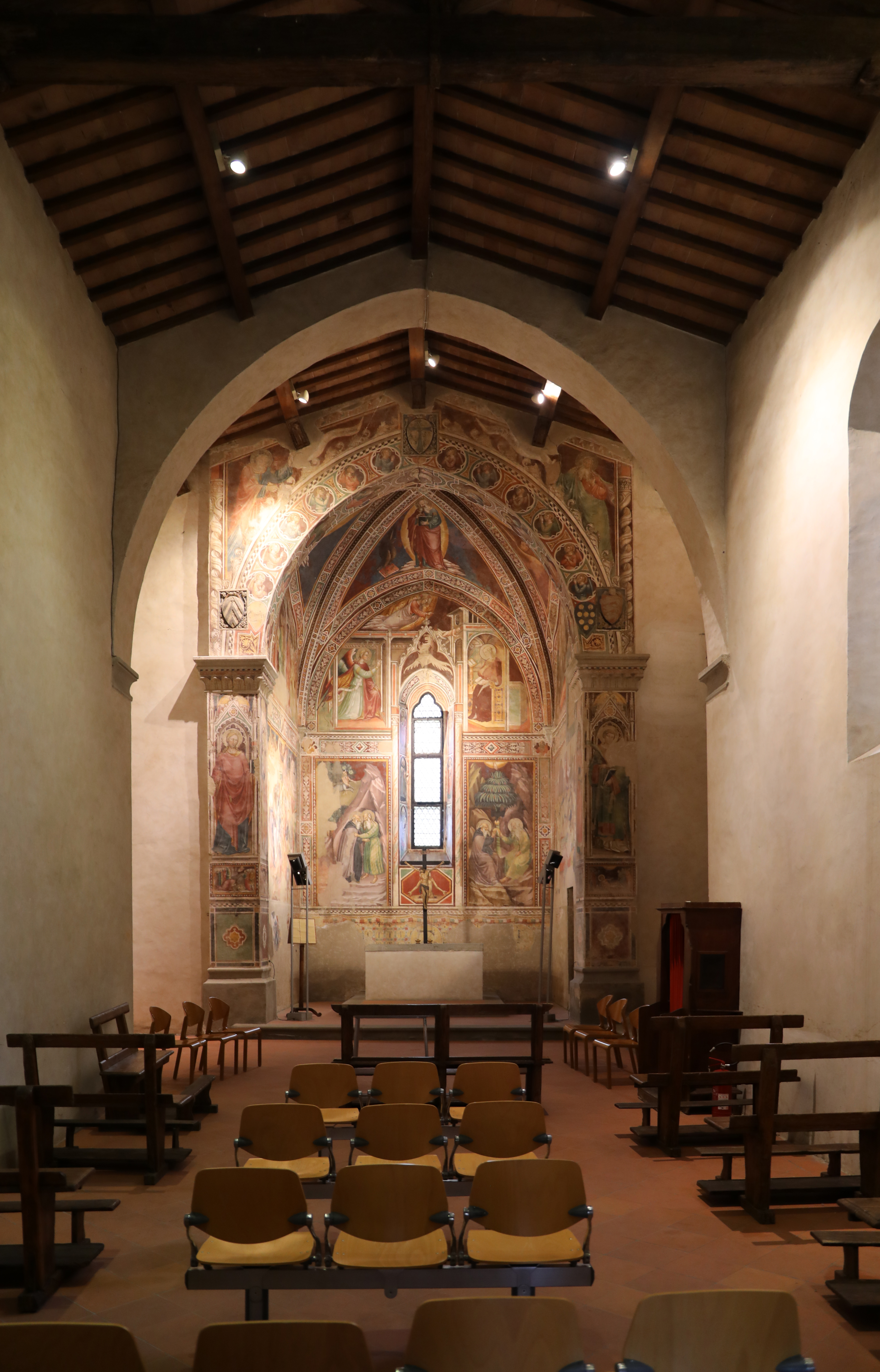
Interior

The Oratory of Sant'Antonio Abate is a 14th-century, Roman Catholic prayer hall or oratory located on Via di San Francesco, adjacent to a convent of the same name and now Hospital of Santi Cosma e Damiano, in the town of Pescia, region of Tuscany, Italy.

== History and description ==
This church once belonged to the Canons Regular of St Anthony of Vienna, known as the Antonines, a congregation founded circa 1095, with the purpose of caring for those suffering from the common medieval disease of St Anthony's fire. The order resided in the adjacent convent till 17th-century. The hospital, once Ospedale Leopoldino, was built in 1764.

The simple exterior is made of semi-rough stones with an oculus. The interiors have frescoes on the Life of St Anthony Abbot (1407) by Bicci di Lorenzo. One of the frescoes, Temptation of St Anthony, depicts a vista of 15th-century Pescia. A 13th-century wooden sculptural group depicts the Deposition.
