= Palazzo Capponi-Covoni =

Coordinates: 43.7752°N 11.2563°E

The Palazzo Capponi Covoni is a Baroque architecture palace in Florence, region of Tuscany, Italy. There are apparently three other palaces once associated with the Capponi family:

- Palazzo Capponi.
- Palazzo Capponi-Vettori.
- Palazzo Capponi alle Rovinate.

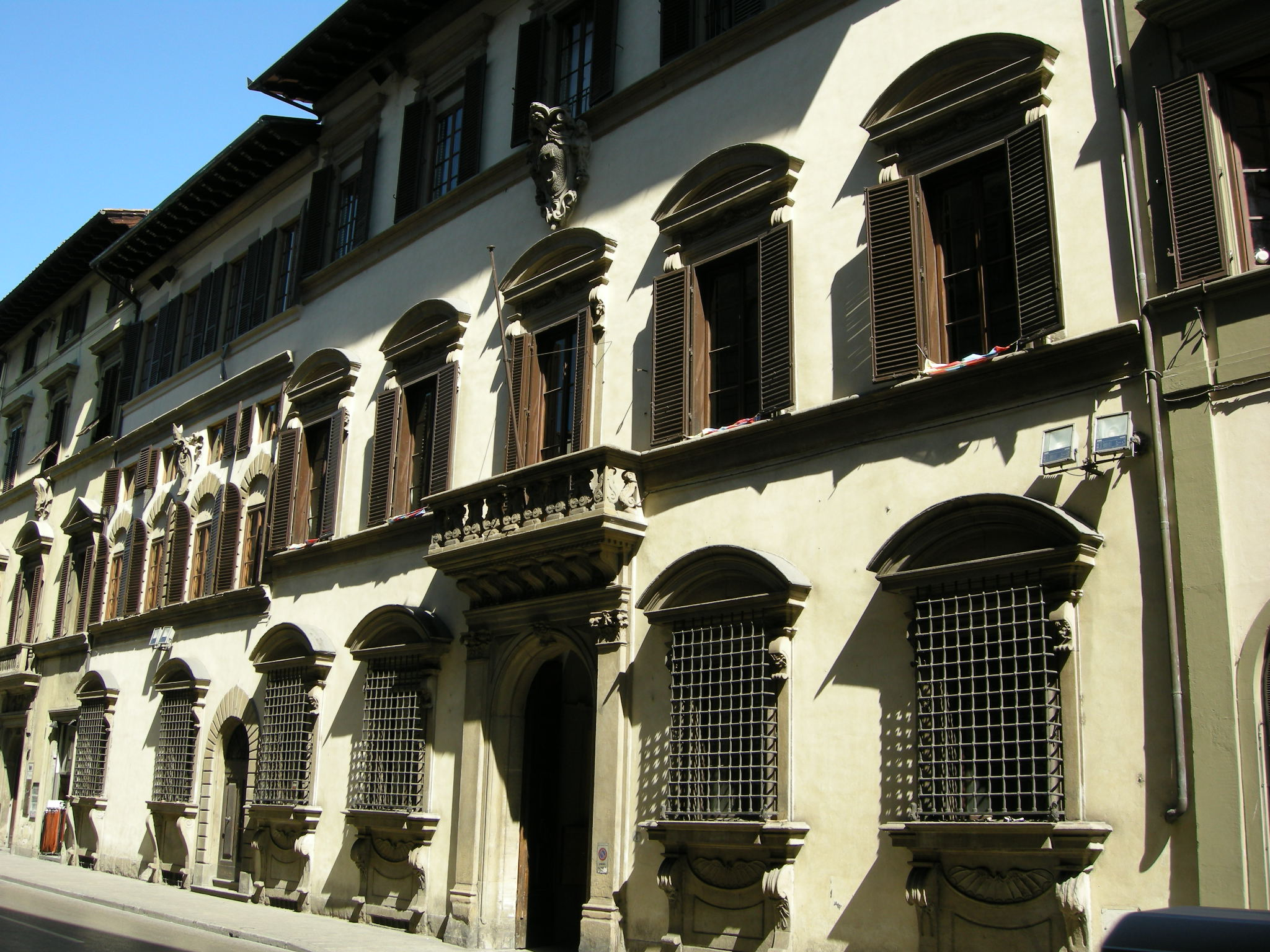
Facade

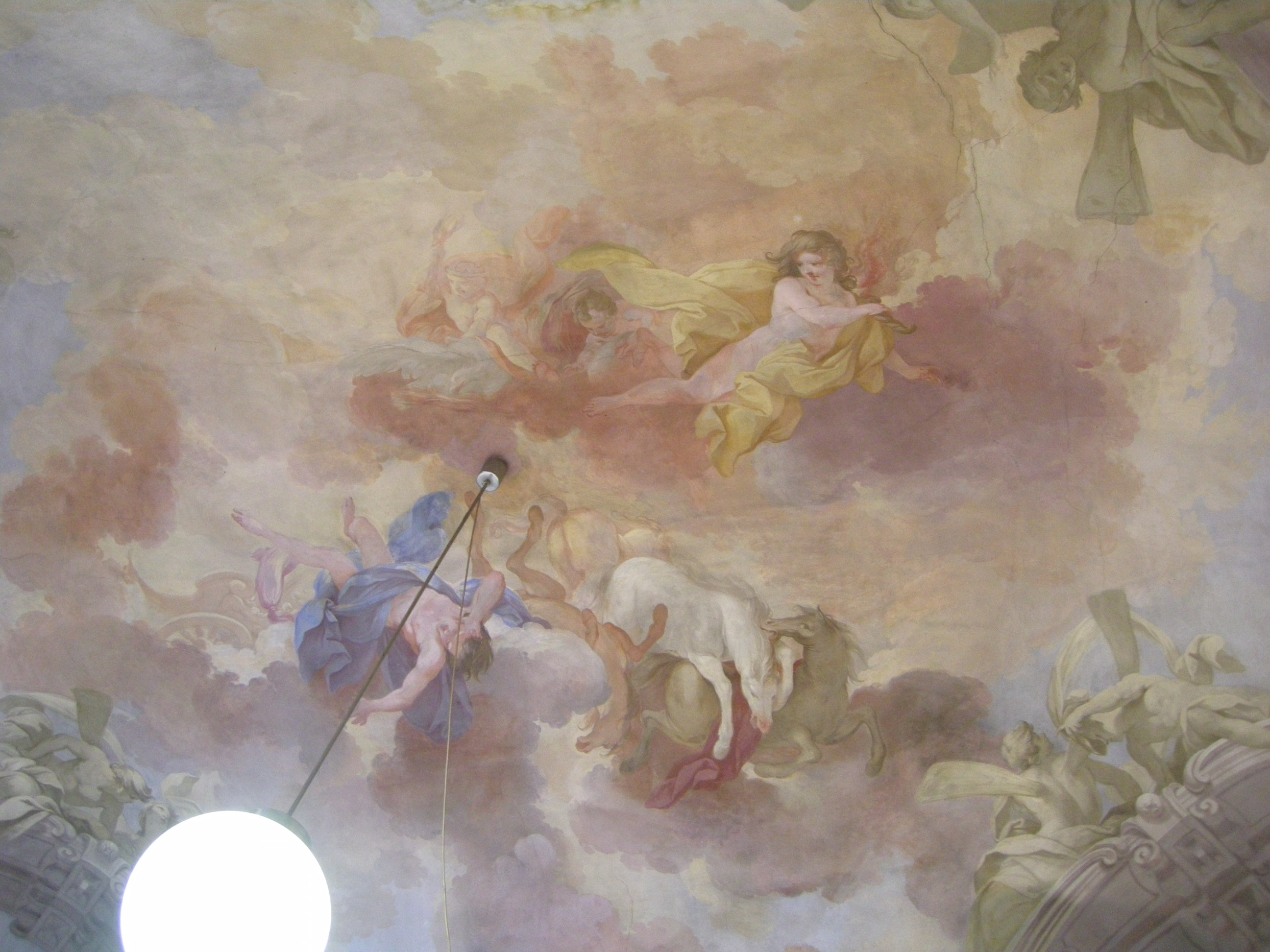
Fall of Phaeton, fresco

== History ==
A large home at the site was documented since 1427. In 1458 two of those houses in Via Larga, today's Via Cavour, were purchased by Agnolo Tani, the director of the branch of the Medici Bank in Bruges. The properties were inherited by the family of Carnesecchi, which for a long period rented the building. In 1623, the wealthy banker Girolamo Piero Capponi, bought the property, and commissioned a palace from the architect Gherardo Silvani. Construction went on for 2 years, and remade the facade and interiors. Further expansions and reconstructions took place in 1730 under the brothers Pier Roberto, Giuliano, and Girolamo Capponi. In 1730, they commissioned the unification of two adjacent palaces from the architect Luigi Orlandi. He reordered the internal courtyard and added a grand entry staircase. The interior chapel was refurbished with polychrome marble and frescoed by Vincenzo Meucci with depictions of Trinity in glory and angelic musicians. Meucci also frescoed the entry ceiling and courtyard gallery, and a ceiling in the piano nobile with the Fall of Phaeton. The fresco decoration also employed Anton Domenico Giarré.

In 1788, the Marquis Roberto di Gino, who had inherited the palace, sold the palace to the brothers Zanobi and Marco Covoni Girolami. The palace was sold again in 1896 to a Piedmontese family. The palace was for some time owned by a company after the First World War, then occupied by the German army during the Second World War. It was home to a masonic club during the 1950s and 1960s. Since 1974, restoration of the interiors has been sponsored by the Regional Council of Tuscany. The adjacent building has housed the Tuscan Assembly since 1973.

== See also ==
- Palazzo Panciatichi, Florence, which is connected to this palace.
