= Capponi Chapel =

Chapel in Santa Felicita, Florence

Coordinates: 43°46′0.83″N 11°15′8.85″E

The Barbadori Chapel, later Capponi Chapel, is a chapel in the church of Santa Felicita in Florence, central Italy. It was designed by Filippo Brunelleschi, and was later decorated by a cycle of works by the Mannerist painter Pontormo.

== History ==
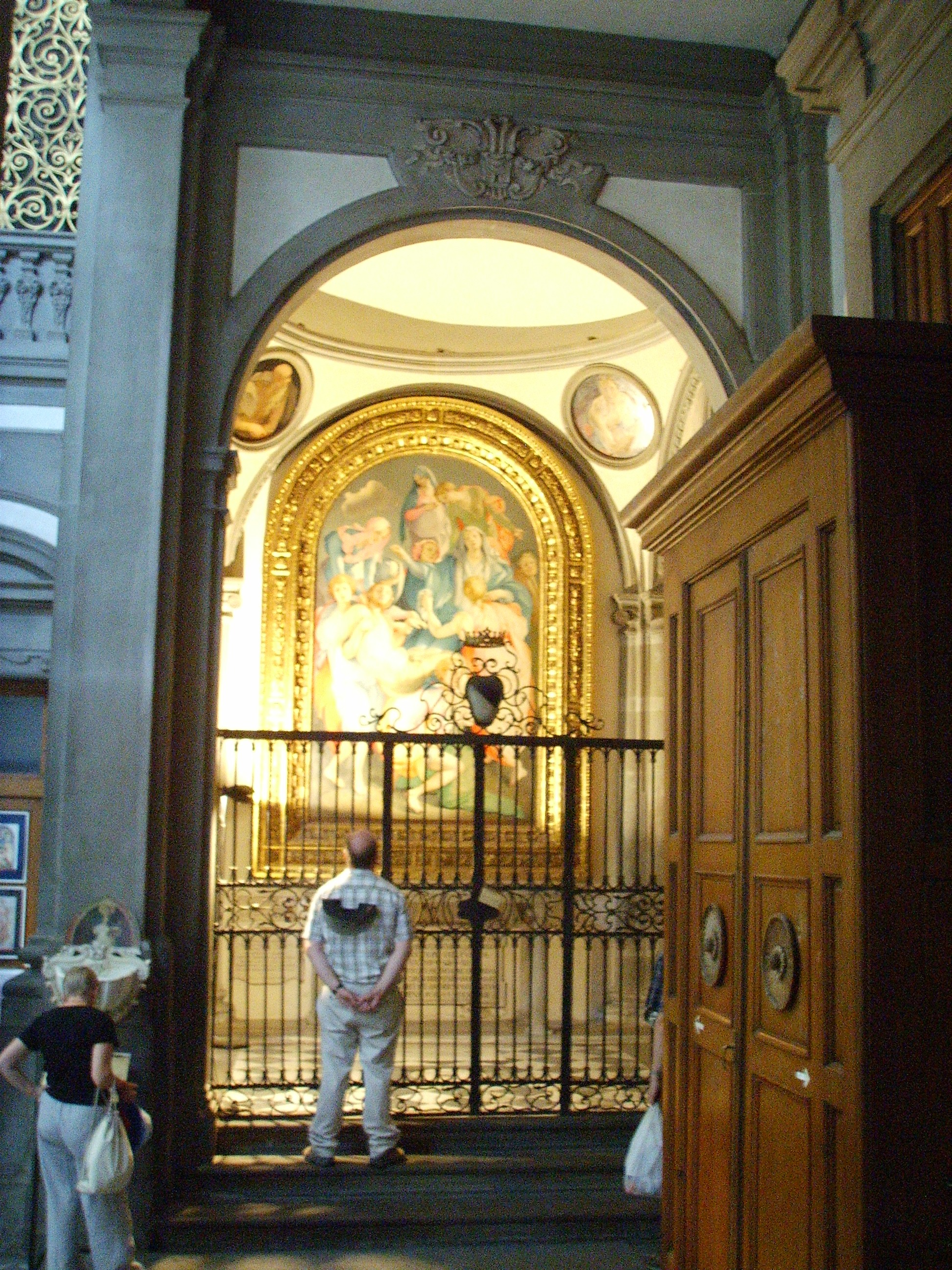
Barbadori Chapel.

Bartolomeo Barbadori commissioned the construction of a family chapel in the church around 1420. After the destruction of the Ridolfi chapel in San Jacopo sopr'Arno, this chapel is the oldest existing among those designed by Brunelleschi. Dedicated to the Virgin, it was most likely built to honor a fresco of the Annunciation, painted on the counter-façade. In the same point Pontormo frescoed the same subject.

In 1487 the chapel was acquired by Antonio Paganelli, whose heir, Bernardo Paganelli, sold it to the Capponi family in 1525. The latter had it restored and decorated by Jacopo Pontormo, with help from a young Agnolo Bronzino.

In 1722 Ferrante Capponi had the chapel restored again, adding a new altar with polychrome marble and closing it with a wrought iron enclosure which still exists. A tondo by Pontormo, depicting the Madonna with Child, was perhaps moved in this period from the chapel to the Capponi private palace.

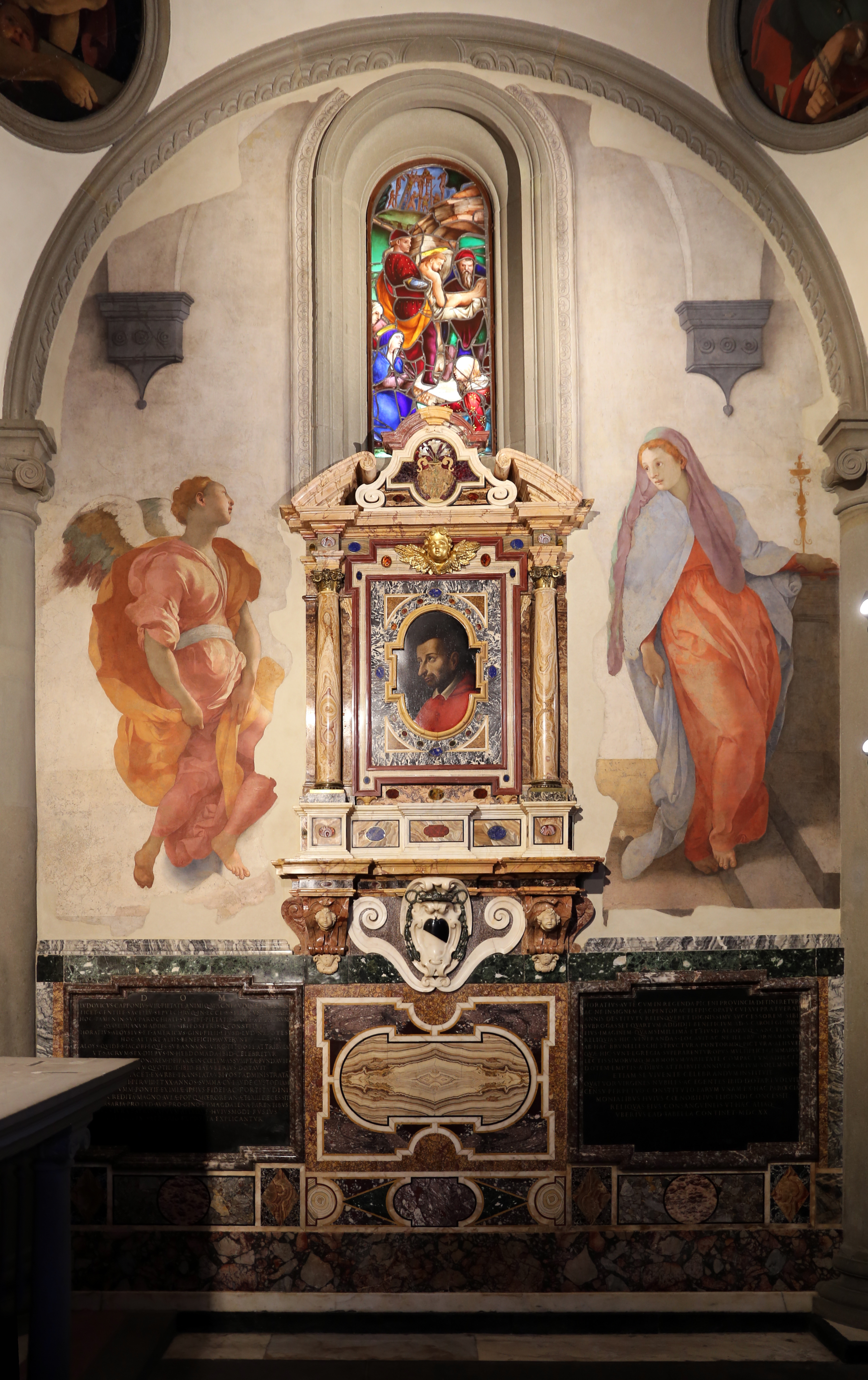
Pontormo's Annunciation with the tabernacle.

== Architecture ==
The chapel was built by Brunelleschi in the period in which he was active in the Spedale degli Innocenti, and was still supporting the feasibility of the dome of Santa Maria del Fiore. He had already studied a reduced version of his subject for the latter in the dome of the Ridolfi Chapel and repeated it in the Barbadori Chapel, though now his design has been hidden by later reconstructions.

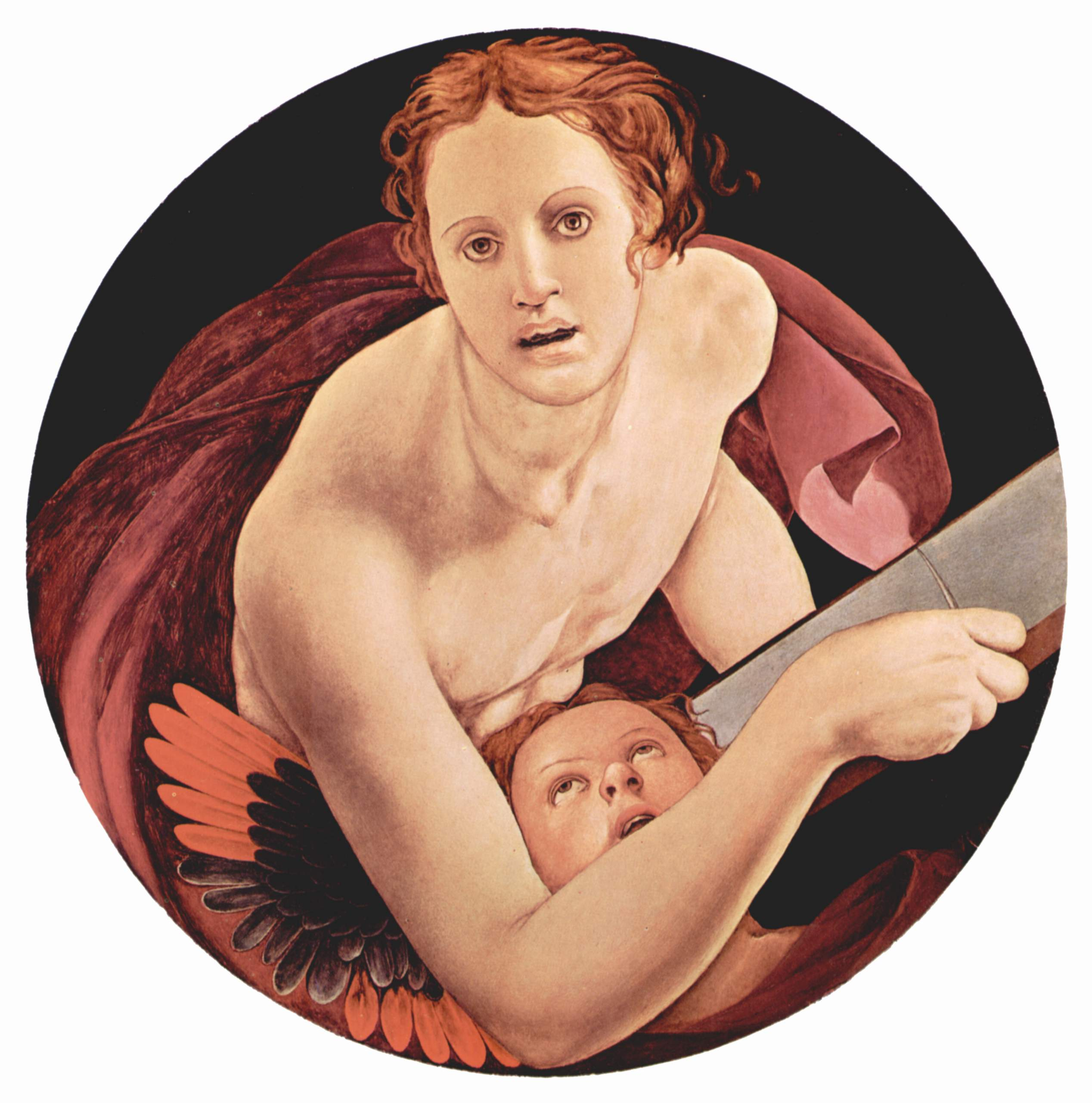
Tondo with Pontormo's St. Matthew.

Originally, the semi-spherical dome was supported by a cubic hall with four pendentives between the round arches of the walls. In each of the pendentives was a blind circular window, now replaced by the frescoes by Pontormo and Bronzino. Also a new feature for the time was the use of double Ionic semicolumns, instead of the traditional Gothic pilasters. The two columns, on the external side, are supported by angular Corithian pilasters. The theme, already used for the portico of the Spedale degli Innocenti, was repeated by Brunelleschi with little variants in the Sagrestia Vecchia and the Pazzi Chapel.

== Paintings and other artworks ==
At the high altar, enclosed in its original 16th century frame, is the masterwork of the Mannerist painter Pontormo, depicting the Deposition from the Cross, executed from 1525 to 1528.

On the western wall are other works by Pontormo, the Annunciation and the three Evangelists in the dome's pendentives. St. Mark is a work by Agnolo Bronzino. The fresco on the vault is lost.

The tabernacle was designed by Jacopo Barozzi da Vignola. In its antependium was Pontormo's Madonna with Child, now in a private chapel in the Palazzo Capponi alle Rovinate.

== Sources ==
- Capretti, Elena (2003). Brunelleschi. Florence: Giunti. ISBN 88-09-03315-9.
