= Bicci di Lorenzo =

Italian renaissance painter (1373–1452)

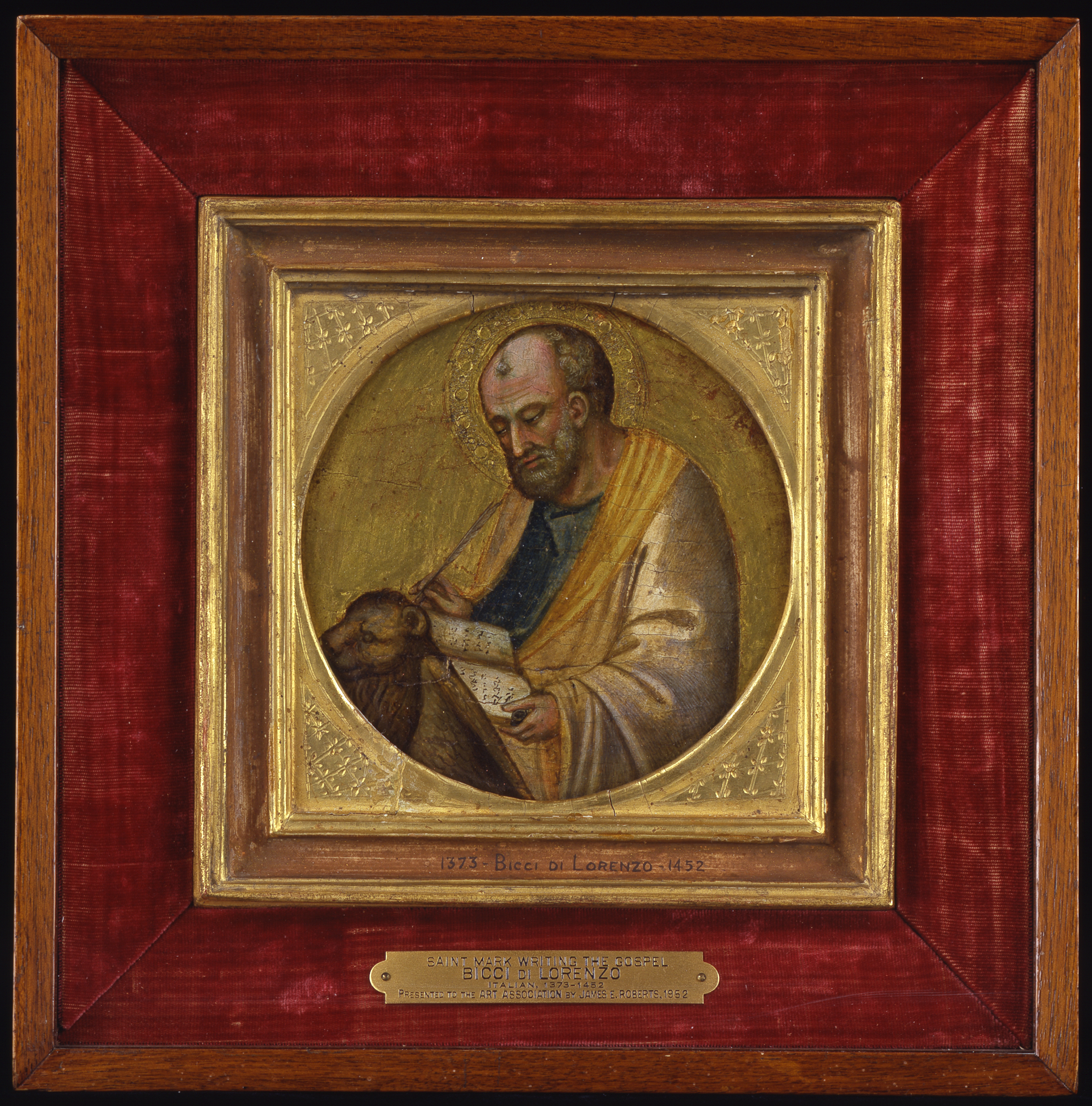
- Bicci di Lorenzo, Saint Mark, Indianapolis Museum of Art
- Born: Bicci di Lorenzo; 1373; Florence Tuscany, Italy
- Died: 1452 (aged 78–79); Florence Tuscany, Italy
- Known for: Painting
- Movement: Gothic

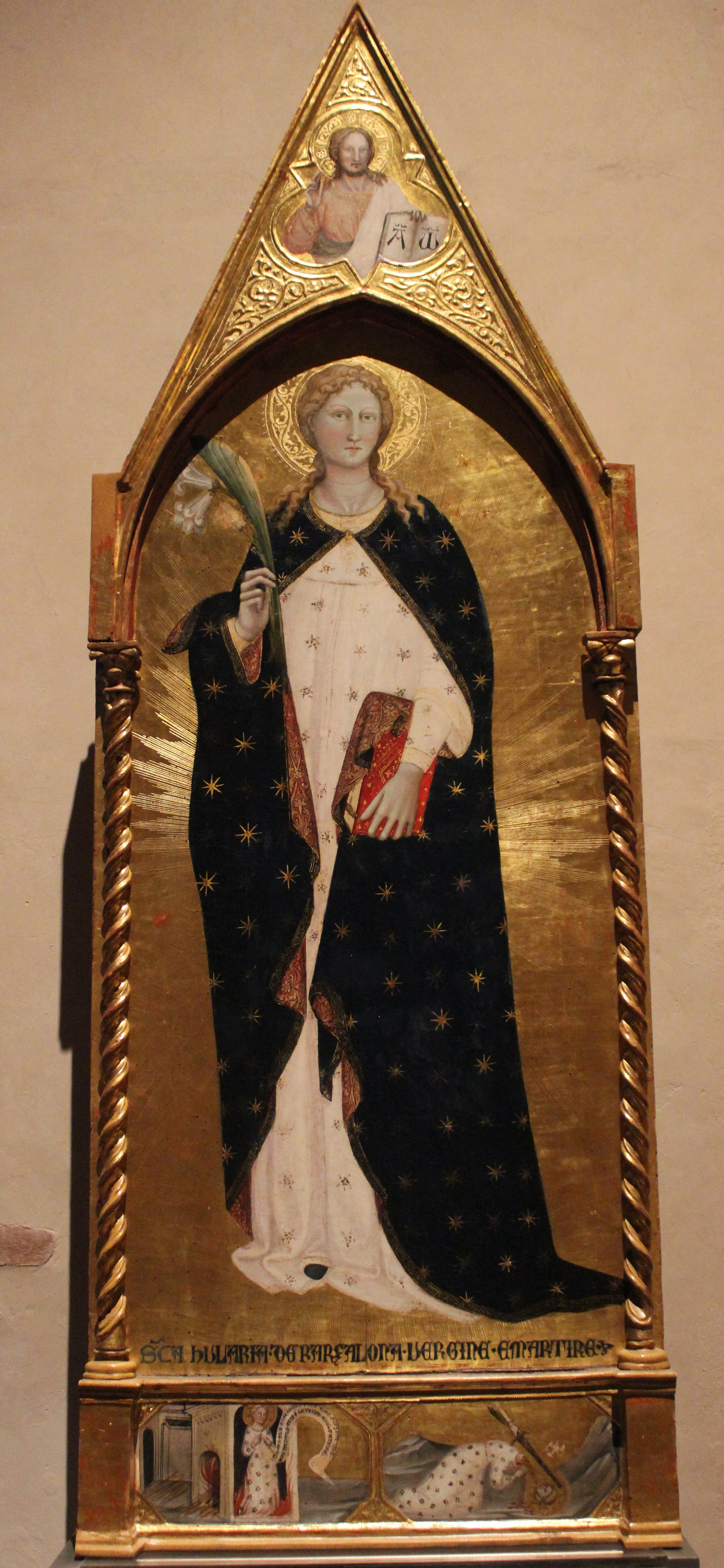
Saint Eulalia de Barcelona, Pisa, Museo di San Matteo Pisa

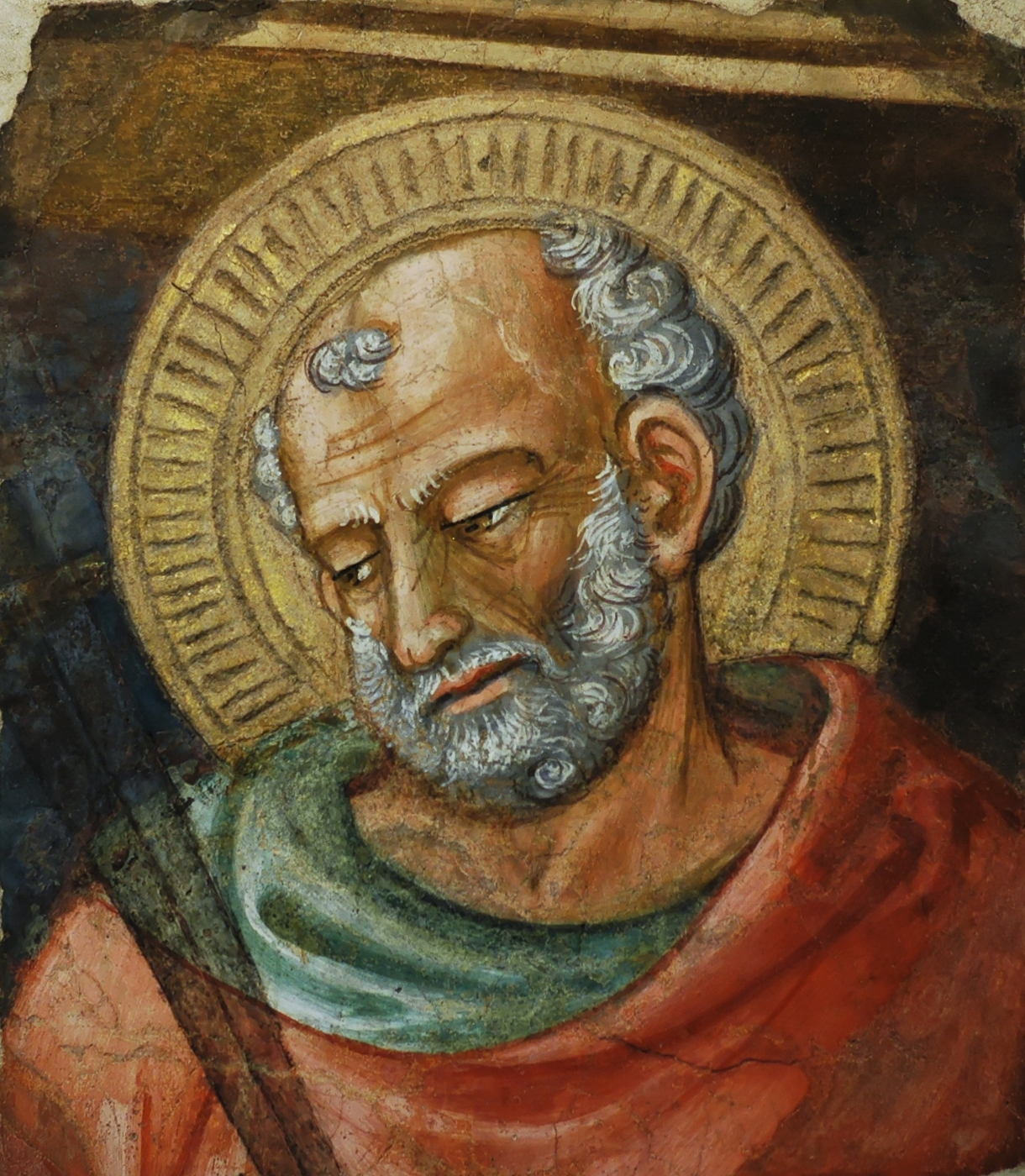
Fresco of Saint Jude the Apostle, painted in Florence Cathedral

Bicci di Lorenzo (1373–1452) was an Italian painter and sculptor, active in Florence.

He was born in Florence in 1373, the son of the painter, Lorenzo di Bicci, whose workshop he joined. He married in 1418, and in 1424 was registered in the Guild of Painters at Florence. His son, Neri di Bicci was also a painter and took over the family workshop. Bicci di Lorenzo died in Florence in 1452 and was buried in Santa Maria del Carmine.

Following early work – largely frescoes – in collaboration with his father, he received a number of important commissions, including, according to Vasari, from the Medici for a cycle of frescoes of Illustrious Men for the Palazzo Medici. For the Opera del Duomo, he painted frescoes of the apostles. And he painted a Saints Cosmas and Damian and frescoes representing the dedication of the church itself for Sant'Egidio in the hospital of Santa Maria Nuova.

Among his major works are an Enthroned Madonna now in the National Gallery at Parma; the Three Scenes from the Life of St Nicholas, a triptych in the cathedral of Fiesole; and a Nativity in the church of San Giovannino dei Cavalieri in Florence. He frescoed the entrance to the Compagni chapel in the church of Santa Trinita, and in the area around Florence, there are frescoes at the Oratory of Sant'Antonio Abate, Pescia; Empoli; and at Lastra a Signa. Tempera panels depicting Saints John the Baptist and Miniato and Saint Anthony and Saint Stephen are found in the Legion of Honor Museum in San Francisco.

== Career and style ==
His training must have taken place in the workshop of his father Lorenzo di Bicci and amidst the influences of Agnolo Gaddi. Throughout his long life, he wasinfluenced by Lorenzo Monaco and with the relations with painters from the Marche region working in Florence, especially with Gentile da Fabriano. Gentile was inspired by the Madonna of the Quaratesi altarpiece (1425), a work by Gentile, for the one (1433) now in the Galleria di Parma (the lateral ones are in the Pinacoteca Stuart in the same city), and freely copied its predella in the execution of the stories of St. Nicholas (two in the Metropolitan Museum in New York and one in the Ashmolean Museum in Oxford) that adorned the step of his dismembered work. At times, as in the Nativity (1435) of San Giovannino dei Cavalieri in Florence, he finds, with some Beato Angelico resonance, spiritual accords with the Sienese, such as Giovanni di Paolo and Sano di Pietro. In his later works he has a slightly broader formal structure, which is not, however, to be put in relation to the fact that in 1441 Bicci di Lorenzo helped Domenico Veneziano in the vanished frescoes of S. Egidio; for the Renaissance exercised no fascination on ours, who always remained resolutely Gothic.
