= Palazzo Capponi, Florence =

Coordinates: 43.7782°N 11.2634°E

The Palazzo Capponi is a Baroque palace located on Via Gino Capponi #26 in Florence, region of Tuscany, Italy. There are apparently three other palaces once associated with the Capponi family:

- Palazzo Capponi-Covoni.
- Palazzo Capponi-Vettori.
- Palazzo Capponi alle Rovinate.

== History ==
Construction took place in 1702–1717 using designs by Carlo Fontana, and completed by Alessandro Cecchini. The palace was commissioned by the marchese Alessandro Capponi, on the street then called via San Sebastiano. The architect Ferdinando Ruggieri may have contributed to refurbishment in later years. The Gardens were commissioned in 1740 by the sons of Capponi (Scipione and Francesco Maria). In 1788 the palace was inherited by Pier Roberto Capponi and later his son, Gino Capponi, a 19th-century Italian statesman and historian. Subsequently, the palace came to be owned in 1920 by the art collector Egisto Paolo Fabbri.

The interior has a theatrical entry staircase in pietra serena with a ceiling frescoed with an Allegory of Triumph. The well has a grotto-like fountain with nymph statues. Among the painters here and in the rooms were Matteo Bonechi, Atanasio Bimbacci, Giovanni Cinqui, and Giovanni Camillo Sagrestani. The palace has a small private garden.
