= Niccolò da Uzzano =

Italian politician, banker and Renaissance humanist (1359–1431)

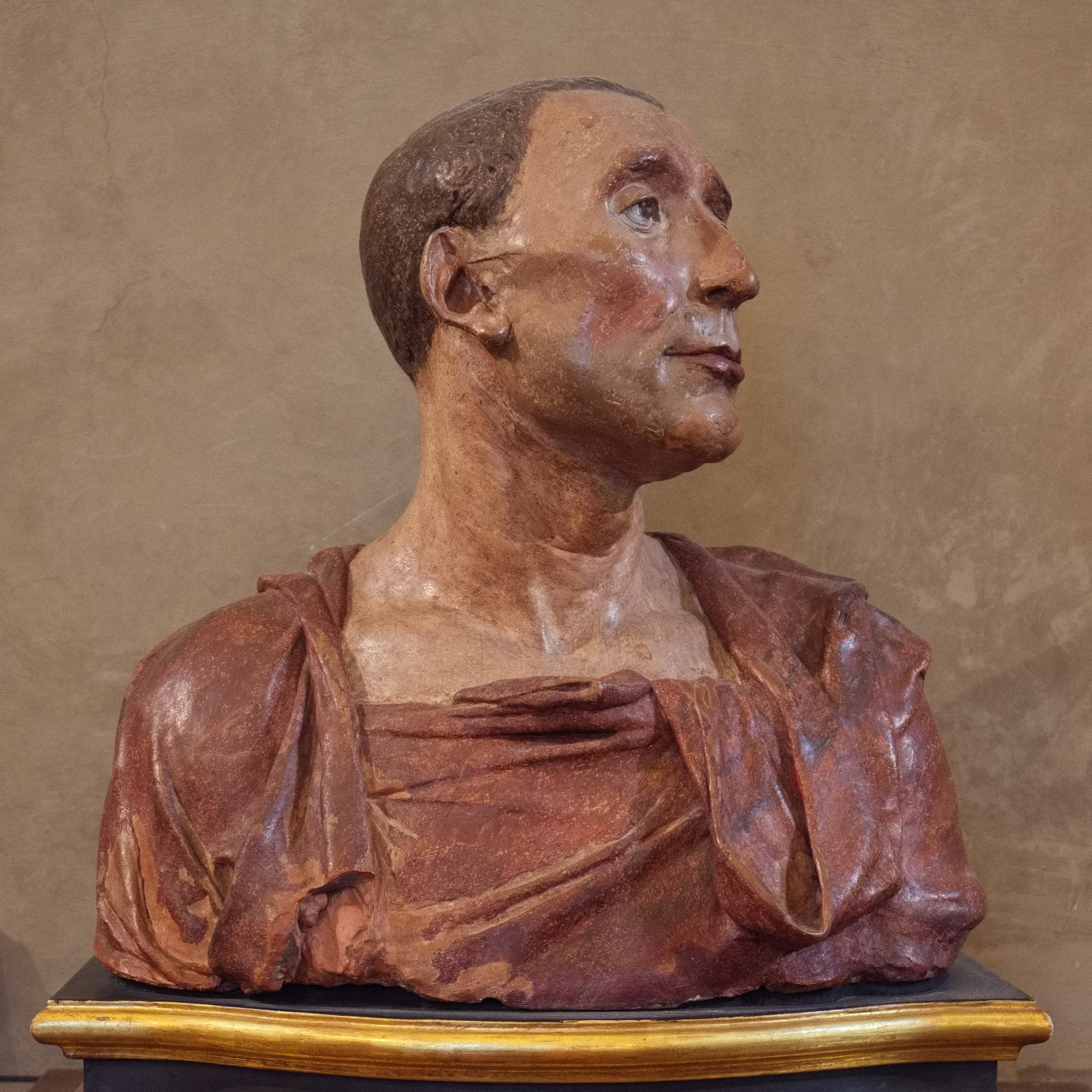
Bust of Niccolò da Uzzano, c. 1430s, attributed to the workshop of Desiderio da Settignano

Niccolò da Uzzano (1359 – 1431 in Florence) was an Italian politician, banker and Renaissance humanist, the Gonfaloniere of Justice in the government of Florence, where he was an associate of the Medici family.

Florence's Palazzo Capponi alle Rovinate was built on his behalf in the first half of the 15th century (completed in 1426) by Lorenzo di Bicci, who always carried out Niccolò's wishes, including those for frescoes and a painting for the Church of Saint Lucia dei Magnoli, which though documented are now lost.

Rinaldo degli Albizzi, a Florentine politician who was openly against the political rise of Cosimo de' Medici was held in check by Niccolò da Uzzano as long as he lived.

Niccolò's family took its name from the Castle of Uzzano in Greve in Chianti.

In the Bargello Museum in Florence, there is a polychrome terracotta bust of Niccolò, attributed to Donatello, dated to around 1432, which might make it the earliest example of this format of Florentine portrait bust.
