= Palazzo Capponi alle Rovinate =

Coordinates: 43°45′58″N 11°15′22″E

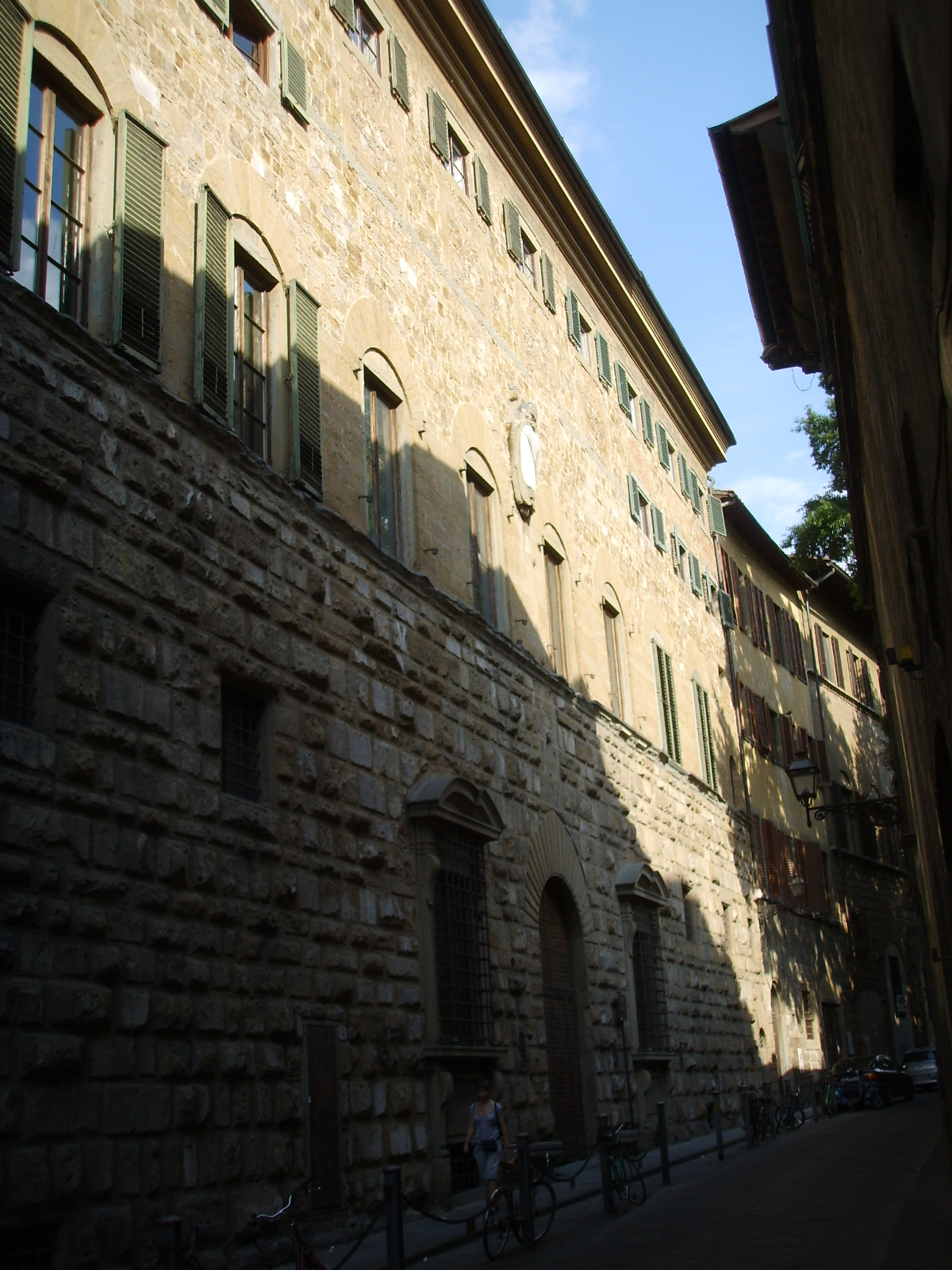
The 15th century façade of the palace on Via de' Bardi.

Palazzo Capponi alle Rovinate is a late-Gothic and early Renaissance-style residential palace located on Via de' Bardi in Florence, region of Tuscany, Italy. There are apparently three other palaces once associated with the Capponi family:

- Palazzo Capponi.
- Palazzo Capponi-Vettori.
- Palazzo Capponi-Covoni.

== Description ==
The palace was built perhaps by Lorenzo di Bicci (although other scholars have attributed it to Filippo Brunelleschi) for Niccolò da Uzzano. It was finished around 1426. After his death a few years later, it was acquired by the Capponi family

It has a 15th-century late-Gothic façade with a sober rustication at the lower floor, surmounted by irregular rows of mullioned windows (some closed and replaced by rectangular openings). The plan is nearly square, with a central courtyard in Renaissance style. This has porticoes on each side, with graffiti decorations dating to the 1450s and octagonal capitals in a still late medieval style. The porticoes are cross-vaulted.

The entrance on Via de' Bardi has fresco, attributed to Lorenzo di Bicci himself, with two flying figures holding the Uzzano coat of arms. Internally, at the feet of the main staircase, is a porphyry lion, an ancient Roman sculpture from the 2nd century AD. In the piano nobile is a small chapel with an altarpiece by Pontormo, perhaps taken from the Barbadori Chapel of the church of Santa Trinita. There is also a stained glass window, with the Deposition from the Cross, by Guillaume de Marcillat (1526).

The rear façade, added in the 19th century, overlooks the Arno River.

== Sources ==
- Vannucci, Marcello (1995). Splendidi palazzi di Firenze. Florence: Le Lettere.
