= Lorenzo di Bicci =

Italian painter (c. 1350–1427)

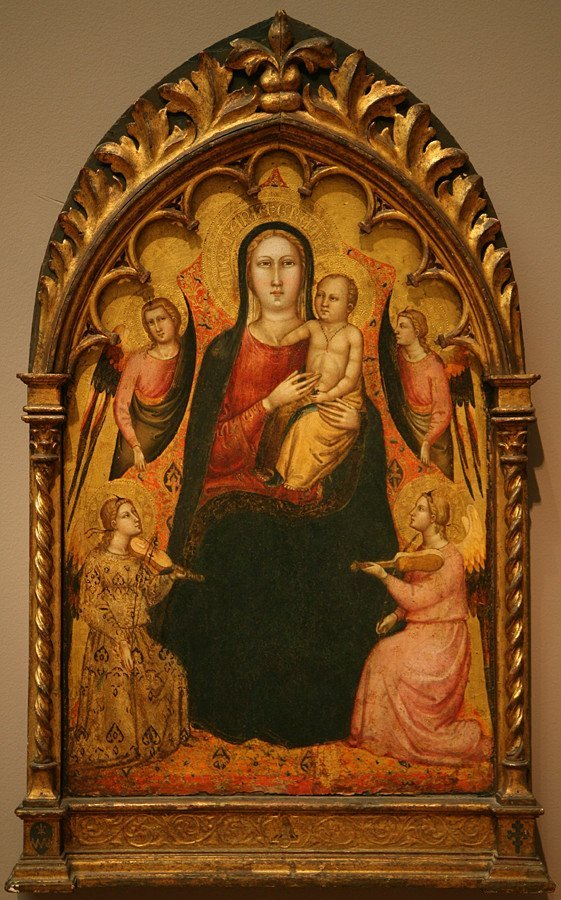
'Madonna and Child with Angels', painting by Lorenzo di Bicci, Fine Arts Museums of San Francisco, 1405–1410

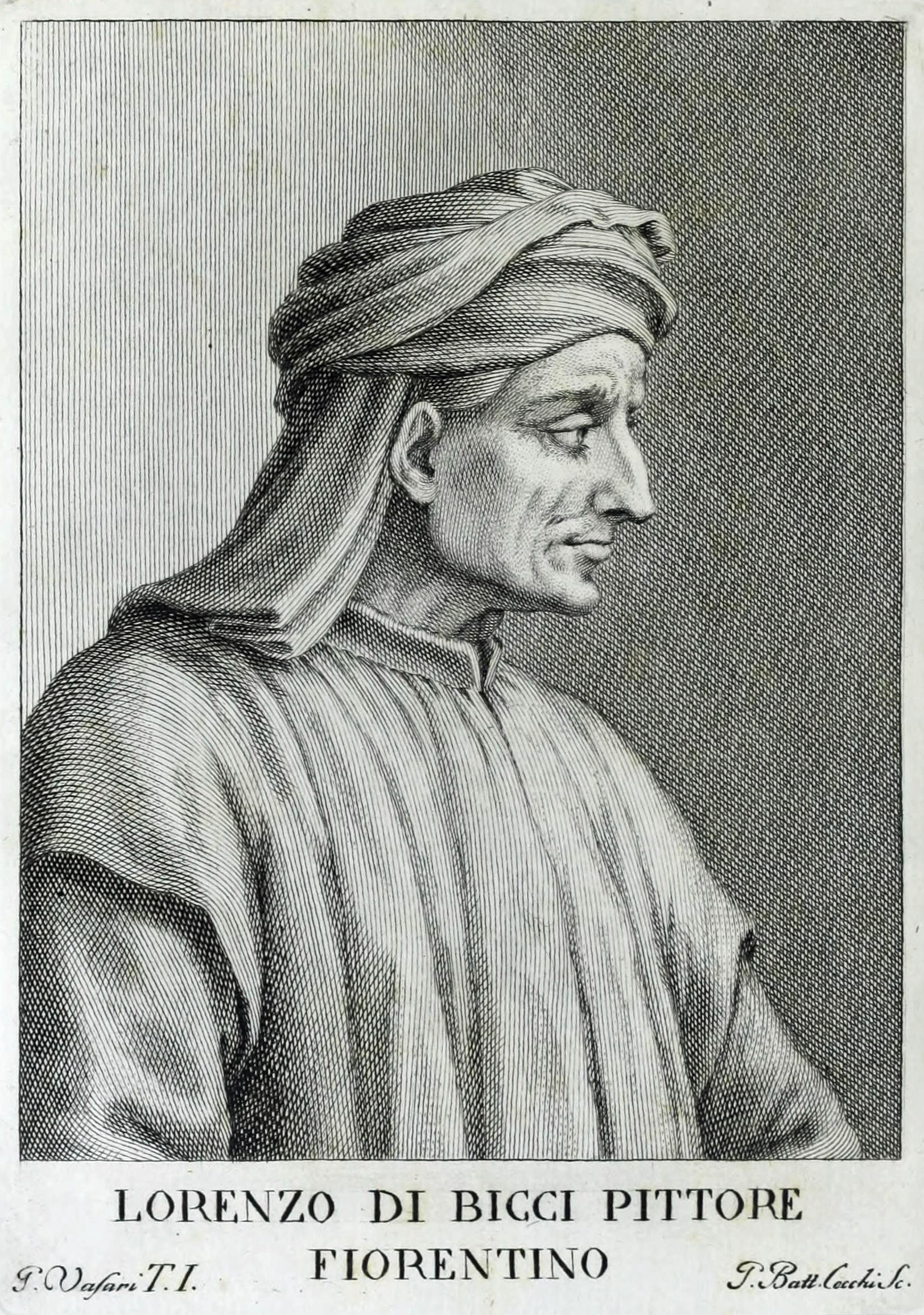
Lorenzo di Bicci

Lorenzo di Bicci (c. 1350 – 1427) was an Italian painter of the Florentine School considered to be one of the most important painters in Florence during the second half of the 14th century. He is believed to have learned his trade from his father, about whom little is known. Lorenzo’s style, as well as that of his contemporaries Jacopo di Cione and Niccolò di Pietro Gerini, was influenced by the artist Andrea di Cione. Lorenzo's paintings made use of bright colors and his compositions avoided complexity. The figures he painted tended to have round faces and were often expressionless. Another one of Lorenzo's distinctive characteristics was his precision of execution. He was known for exceptional talent in drawing, an ability that he put to use at the initial stages of his painting. Unlike many celebrated Florentine artists of this period, Lorenzo mostly received commissions from the country clergy and from the lower-middle-class Florentine guilds. His successors, Bicci di Lorenzo and Neri di Bicci, continued to serve these groups.

== Early life and training ==
Lorenzo di Bicci was born in Florence around 1350. He is thought to have been taught the art of painting by his father, who most likely went by the nickname Jacopo, although his full name is currently unknown. By 1370, Lorenzo had become a member of the Guild of Saint Luke, the painters’ guild of Florence. The guild was named in honor of Luke the Evangelist, the patron saint of artists, whom John of Damascus had recognized as having painted the Virgin Mary's portrait. The Guild of Saint Luke brought together artists from a range of disciplines in Renaissance Florence. Lorenzo's earliest work suggests the influence of a master whose identity is unknown but who was believed to be a member of the Guild of Saint Luke.

== Early career ==
Lorenzo's first public work was a panel depicting St. Martin Enthroned, painted for the Arte dei Vinattieri, the wine-merchants’ guild of Florence. The painting was mounted in the Florentine church of Orsanmichele on a pilaster assigned to the guild on October 4, 1380, and is now in the Depositi Galleria d'Arte in Florence. The predella depicts the episode of St. Martin dividing his cloak with the beggar. It was about this time that Lorenzo began working with the painters Agnolo Gaddi, Corso di Jacopo, and Jacopo di Luca, and the goldsmiths Piero del Miglior and Niccolo del Lucia. As a group they were commissioned to value the statues of Faith and Hope by Giacomo di Pero created for the spandrels of the Loggia della Signoria in Florence. Lorenzo was commissioned to apply the blue enamelled ground and to gild the statues, work that provided him a steady income.

A more significant project arrived In 1387 when Lorenzo was employed to decorate the cathedral of Florence. This was a major project already underway at the time. Together with Spinello Aretino and Agnolo Gaddi, Lorenzo produced preliminary drawings for the statues of the four Apostles which would be executed in marble for the façade of the church. Once the series of statues was completed, he was then commissioned, again with Aretino and Gaddi, to paint and gild them. In his biography of the artist, Giorgio Vasari notes that Lorenzo learned much of his craft from Spinello, probably during this time.

Although Giorgio Vasari’s biography of Lorenzo is replete with misattributions, it does suggest that Lorenzo, during this period, produced frescoes both in and out of the city of Florence. Vasari suggests that Giovanni di Bicci de’ Medici commissioned Lorenzo to paint the hall of the old house of the Medici family. Among other works that Vasari mentions are a shrine on the bridge of Scandicci and a fresco of saints together with a Madonna at Cerbaia. According to Vasari, Lorenzo was then commissioned by the family of the Medici to paint a chapel in San Marco in Florence, a fresco in which he illustrated many stories of the Madonna and depicted the Virgin herself surrounded by many saints.

== Later work ==
In 1394 Lorenzo returned to the Loggia della Signoria where he painted and gilded the statue of Charity by Jacopo di Piero Guidi. In 1395, he was commissioned to value a statue of St. Victor by Piero di Giovanni Tedesco for the facade of the Florence cathedral. Three years later, in Florence, Lorenzo created three polylobed panels for the altar of the Madonna delle Grazie in the cathedral’s nave. The panels displayed half-length images of St John the Evangelist, St. Matthew, and St. Mark. Another artist, Pesello, was responsible for the image of the Agnus Dei, which centered the canopy’s vault, while Lorenzo's most significant contribution was a curtain that accompanied the image of the Virgin. This canopy has since been dismantled and Lorenzo's panels depicting the Evangelists are now housed in the Sagrestia dei Canonici in the cathedral. The Compagni della Croce di Santo Stefano in Empoli commissioned Lorenzo, in 1399, to produce a triptych.

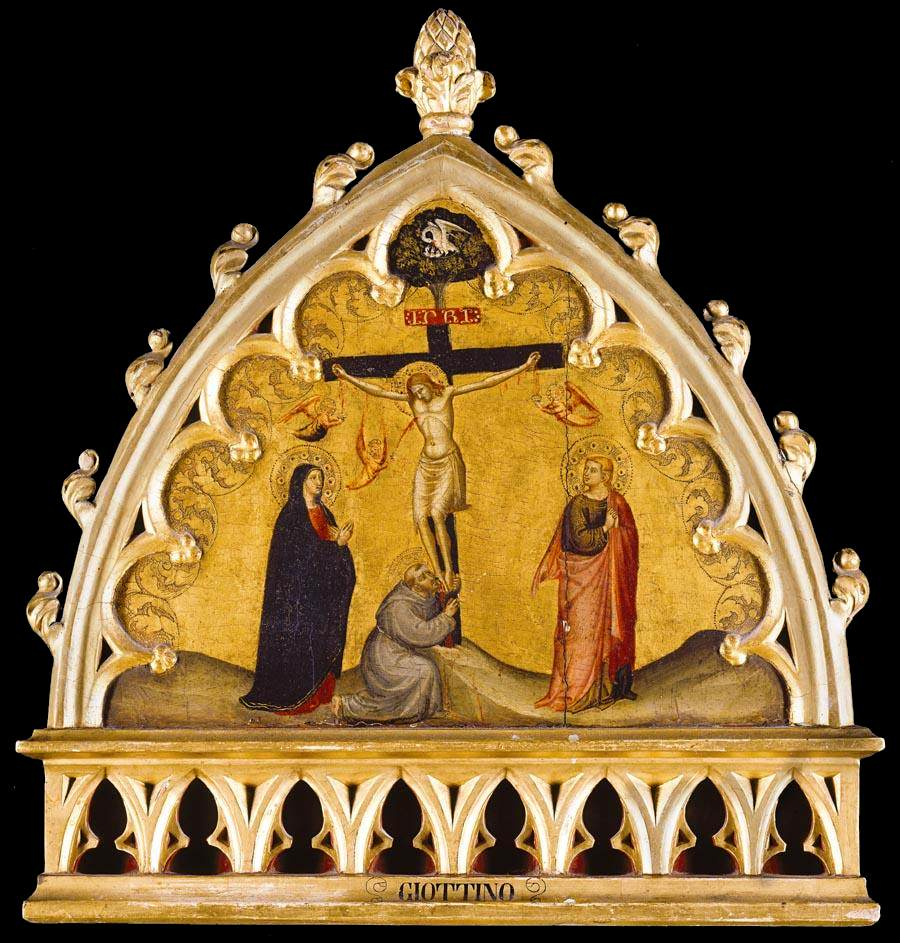
'Crucifixion' painting by Lorenzo di Bicci, Museo della Collegiata di Sant'Andrea, c. 1399

Lorenzo is believed to have painted two crucifixions during the years 1399 and 1400 respectively. The first is housed in the Museo della Collegiata di Sant'Andrea in Empoli and utilizes a simple, two-dimensional design. The panel represents the Crucifixion with the Virgin Mary, St. John the Evangelist and St. Francis of Assisi at the foot of the cross. It is believed to have constituted the top half of a larger panel. The second crucifixion depicts Christ on the cross surrounded by angels collecting his spilt blood. The letters INRI labeling "Jesus of Nazareth The King of the Jews" are displayed on the red headpiece above the cross. The Christ and angels depicted in the later crucifixion are compositionally very similar to the first.

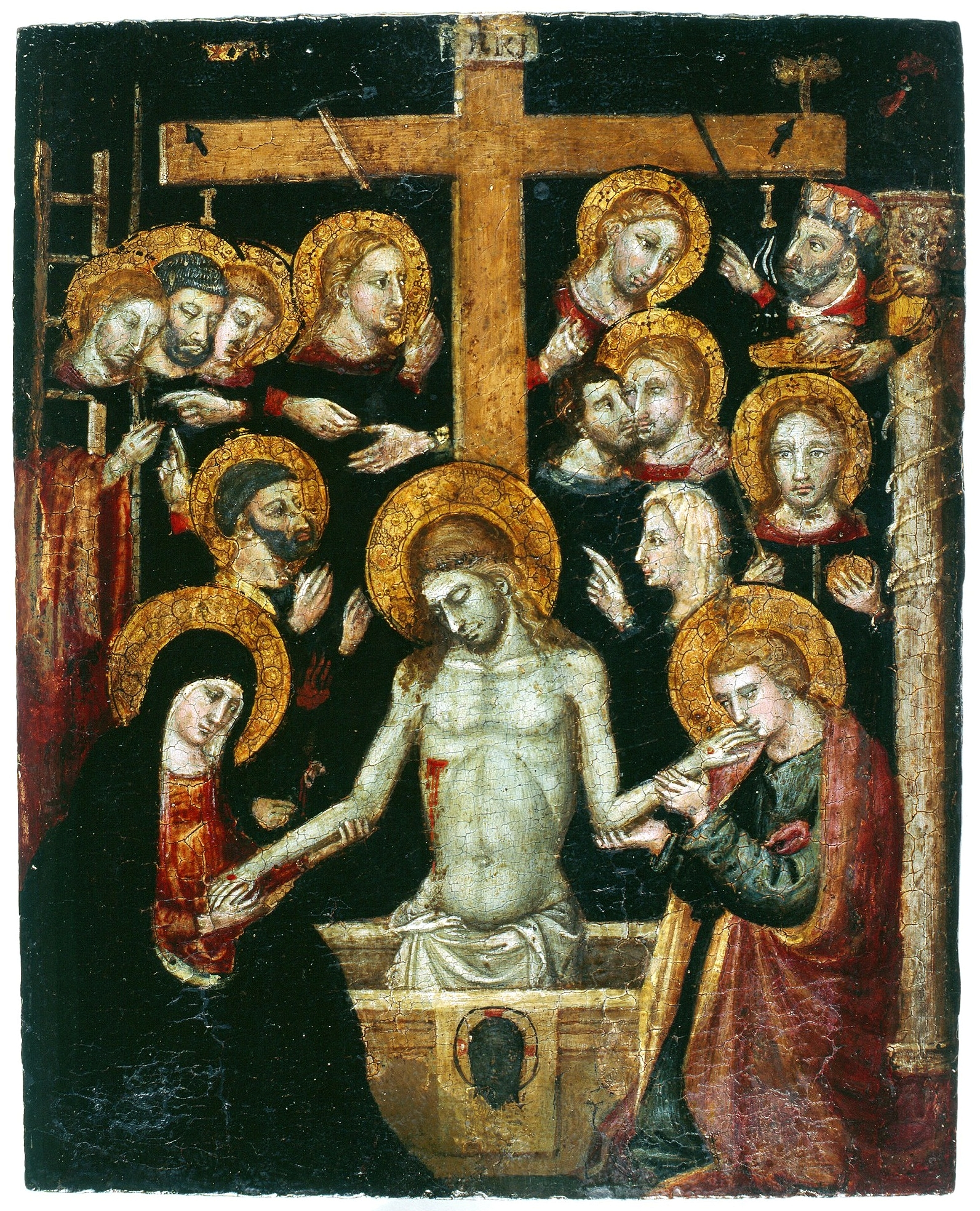
'Imago Pietatis', painting by Lorenzo di Bicci, Czartoryski Museum in Kraków, first quarter of 15th century

Historians believe that Lorenzo painted a work of St. Francis and St. Anthony Abbot around the year 1400. The painting is thought to have occupied the left side of a multi-paneled altarpiece. The remaining panels are either lost or unidentified. The figures illustrated are the saints Francis of Assisi, who founded the Franciscan order in the early thirteenth century, and Anthony the Great, a Christian monk known as the Father of All Monks. The stigmata of St Francis are pin-pointed with tiny gold rays.

Information concerning the next decade of Lorenzo's life and work is scanty. From 1410 there is a record of him having been paid fourteen florins for a figure of St. Nicholas for the lunette of the portal of the Ospedale di San Matteo, Florence. This work is now at the Accademia di Belle Arti. Some historians believe Lorenzo oversaw the construction of the Palazzo Capponi alle Rovinate, a late-Gothic style palace located on Via de’ Bardi in Florence, Italy. This work appears to have been commissioned by Niccolò da Uzzano, an Italian politician in the government of Florence. Lorenzo was often commissioned by Uzzano, and these commissions included frescoes and a painting for the Church of Saint Lucia dè Magnoli.

Giorgio Vasari’s biography of Lorenzo indicates that in 1418, Lorenzo painted a large fresco of St. Thomas examining a wound in the side of Christ. This fresco additionally included the other Apostles who were shown as surrounding Christ. Adjacent to this scene Lorenzo created a fresco of St. Christopher, and Vasari suggests that up until this point, no artist had successfully depicted a figure on such a large scale with accurate proportions. Other historians have attributed these works to Bicci di Lorenzo, Lorenzo's son. In any case, both works, impressive in scale, have managed to retain their color and definition for hundreds of years.

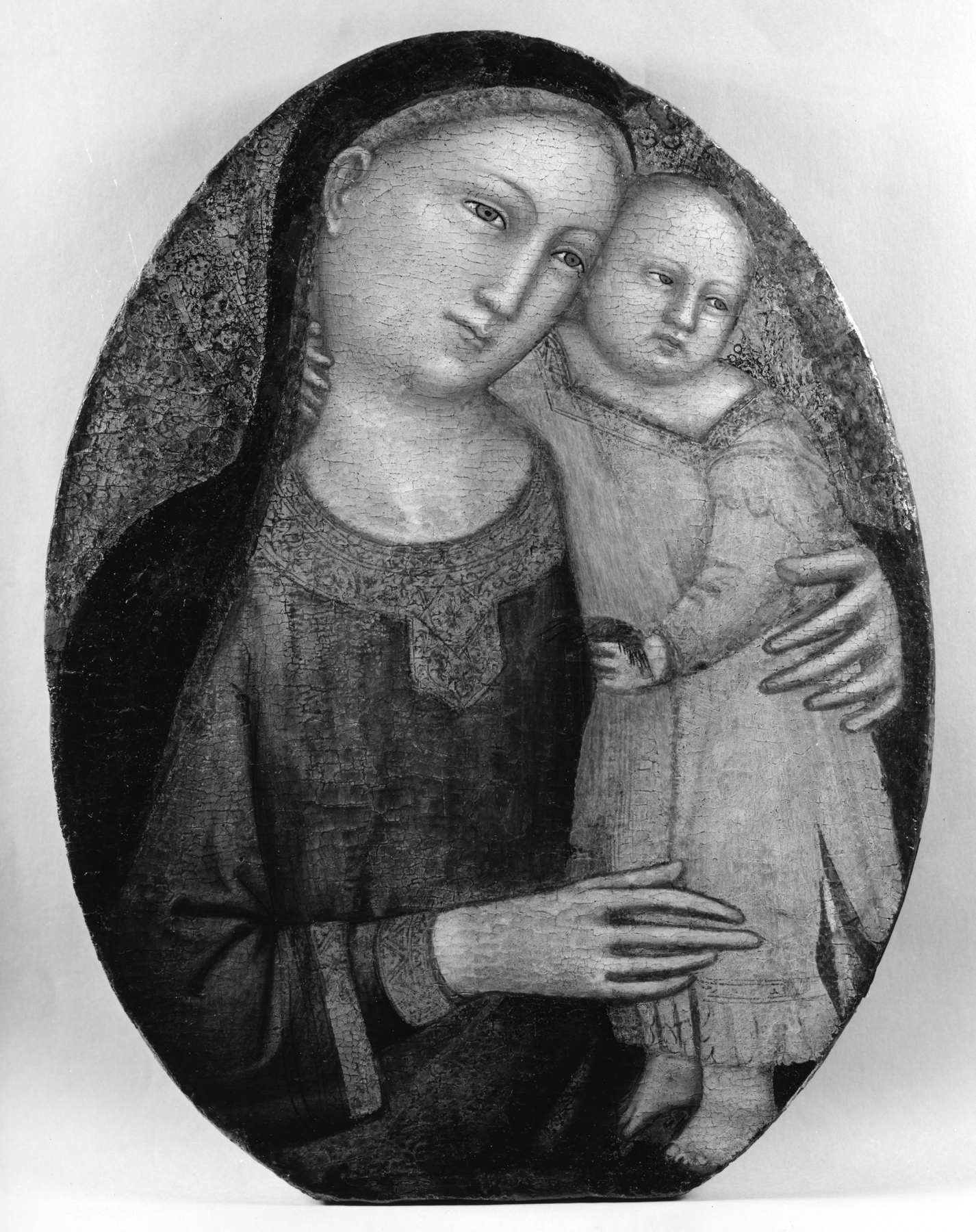
'Madonna and Child' painting by Lorenzo Di Bicci, Walters Art Museum, c. 1400

=== Madonna and child paintings ===
Lorenzo is reported to have completed many Madonna and child paintings, however little is known about the composition dates of these paintings. Between 1375 and 1380, Lorenzo is known to have painted a Madonna of Humility with Two Angels, which is extant and held privately. Until 1936, this panel was attributed to Jacopo di Cione. A very similar work known to have been completed by Lorenzo between 1405 and 1410 titled Madonna and Child with Angels is conserved in the Fine Arts Museum of San Francisco, lending further support to the current attribution of the Madonna of Humility. In style, Lorenzo's is part of an established tradition. The best known is the Madonna dell'Umilita, painted by Guariento di Arpo, which Lorenzo's painting closely resembles. In both paintings, the Madonna is posed on a cushion, seated in a demure fashion suggestive of humility. The blue of her apparel is in the tradition of the Madonna and, in the case of Lorenzo's painting, the clothing is notable for its simplicity, with the absence of any elaborate drapery that is sometimes depicted. Again, this style is suggestive of the humble nature of the seated figure.

Some years later Lorenzo painted a Madonna and Child with St. John the Baptist, Catherine of Alexandria, Anthony Abbot, and St. Nicholas at the Virgin's feet. The work is executed in tempera and gold on a wood panel and its size is that of a typical anconetta, or small altarpiece. During the time of Lorenzo, this image would likely have been framed in a Gothic-style tabernacle as it would have served for private, rather than public, enjoyment. Neri di Bicci, Lorenzo's grandson painted a similar work. Neri's Virgin and Child Enthroned with Two Angels and St. Ansanus, John the Baptist, St. Nicholas, St. Sebastian, Catherine of Alexandria, and Bartholomew currently resides at the Philadelphia Museum of Art. It is believed that Neri drew inspiration from his grandfather Lorenzo.

A number of other Madonnas are attributed to Lorenzo, one of which is located at the Walters Art Museum in Baltimore. The locations of the remaining paintings are unknown.

=== Major work ===
Perhaps Lorenzo's best-known work is a devotional triptych painted in 1399 that now hangs in the Museo della Collegiata di Sant'Andrea in Empoli. The Madonna is present in all three panels, although only in the center panel is she the dominant presence. The left wing depicts the Nativity and shows the Madonna kneeling in an attitude of prayer. A seated saint is in the foreground and the panel's upper section, which comes to a point, depicts a seated angel. The right panel displays the crucifixion and the Madonna is one of three figures beneath the crucifix. As in the left panel, she is clearly recognizable because of the consistency in the color of her garments and the simplicity of her figure. The pinnacle of the right panel showcases a seated female figure praying. In both side panels, Madonna's figure is on the same scale as the other figures, whereas in the center panel, she is not. The central figure is nearly identical to the Madonna of Humility with Two Angels, further suggesting that the earlier Madonna was indeed the work of Lorenzo. The Madonna in the center panel sits on a Gothic throne, adorned with a red and gold cloth. A Christ Child sits on her lap and grips her finger. Surrounding them are a group of six Saints, including both John the Evangelist and John the Baptist. Lorenzo's artistic style is seen in the clean and simple compositional structure, the use of bright color, and the expressionless character of the figures' faces.

== Influences ==
Lorenzo's style was influenced by Andrea di Cione di Arcangelo, who was an Italian painter, sculptor, and architect in Florence. Lorenzo served as one of his pupils and worked alongside Jacopo di Cione, Andrea's younger brother and an Italian Gothic period painter active in Florence.

== Death and legacy ==
It is now clear that many of the works that Vasari attributed to Lorenzo di Bicci were in fact produced by his son, Bicci di Lorenzo. Similarly, Joseph Archer Crowe and Giovanni Battista Cavalcasele, two highly respected Italian art critics, attributed several frescoes to Lorenzo, including those in the Santa Maria del Carmine, Florence, and those in San Francesco, Arezzo, that are now thought to be painted by Bicci di Lorenzo. Some confusion between the works of father and son is understandable, considering that Lorenzo personally trained his son in his workshop, one of the largest and most active studios in Florence at that time. Bicci di Lorenzo went on to become an influential painter and sculptor, much like his father, while Lorenzo's grandson, Neri di Bicci, inherited the workshop following the death of Lorenzo di Bicci and Bicci di Lorenzo.

Lorenzo is believed to have died in 1427, although the exact date of death is unknown. Lorenzo's workshop continued to flourish for over a century. Even now, art historians believe that many of his most significant works have yet to be identified.

== Surviving art works ==
- Madonna of Humility with Two Angels (c. 1375-1380), Private Collection
- St. Martin Enthroned (c. 1380), Depositi Galleria Arte, Florence
- St. Julian and St. Zanobius (c. 1380-1400), Academia Gallery, Venice
- St. Mark (c. 1398), Museo dell'Opera del Duomo, Florence
- The Crucifixion (c. 1399), Museo della Collegiata di Sant'Andrea, Empoli
- Triptych (c. 1399), Museo della Collegiata di Sant'Andrea, Empoli
- Madonna and Child (c. 1400), Walters Art Museum, Baltimore
- Crucifixion (c. 1400), Allentown Art Museum, Pennsylvania
- St. Francis and St. Anthony Abbot (c. 1400), Bristol City Museum and Art Gallery, Bristol
- Madonna and Child with Angels (c. 1405-1410), Fine Arts Museum, San Francisco
- St. Nicholas (c. 1410), Accademia di Belle Arti, Florence
