= Saints John the Baptist and Minias (Bicci di Lorenzo) =

Painting by Bicci di Lorenzo

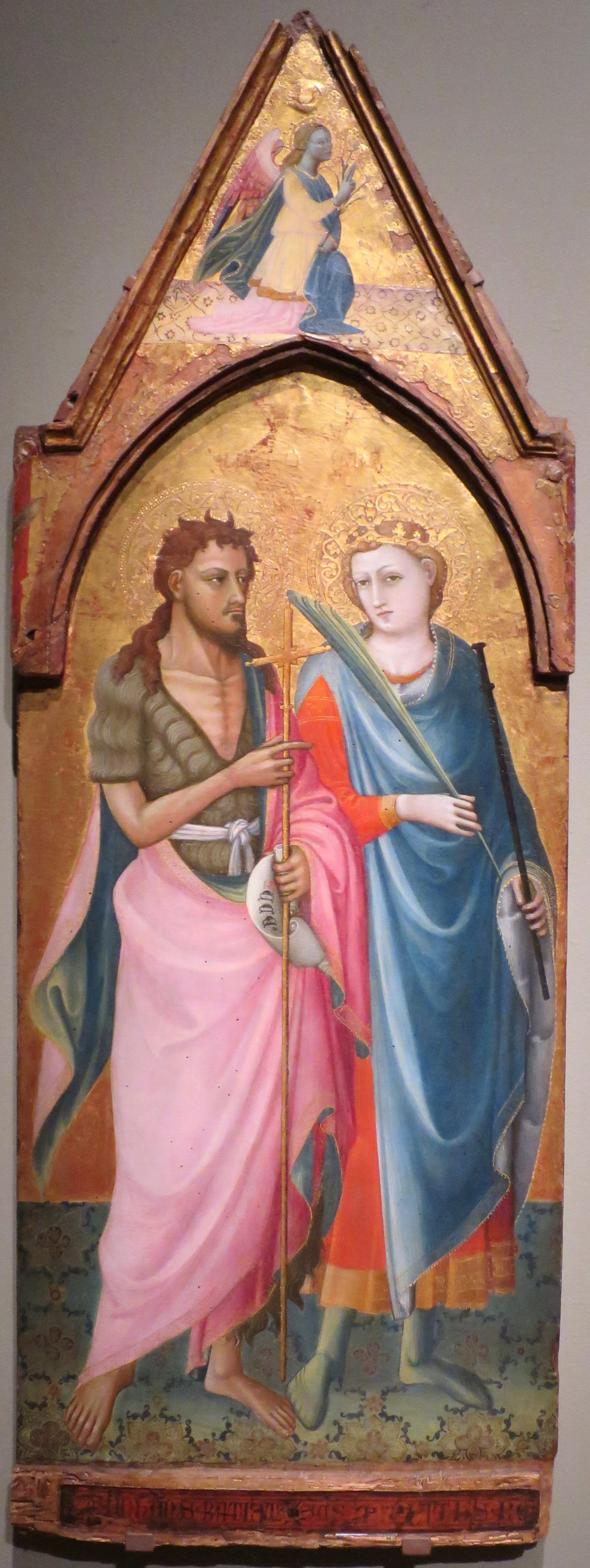
Icon of Saint John the Baptist and Minias of Florence

Saints John the Baptist and Minias is an early-Quattrocento (1400–1450) wood panel with tempera painting by the Florentine Italian Renaissance painter Bicci di Lorenzo (1373–1452).

== Work ==
Saint Minias of Florence is also known as San Miniato. The painting is tempera and gold sheet on poplar. It is now in the Legion of Honor Museum in San Francisco, California, which also has a similar peaked wood panel by Bicci, depicting Saints Anthony and Stephen. These are almost certainly panels from a larger altarpiece.
