= Neri di Bicci =

Italian painter

Neri di Lorenzo
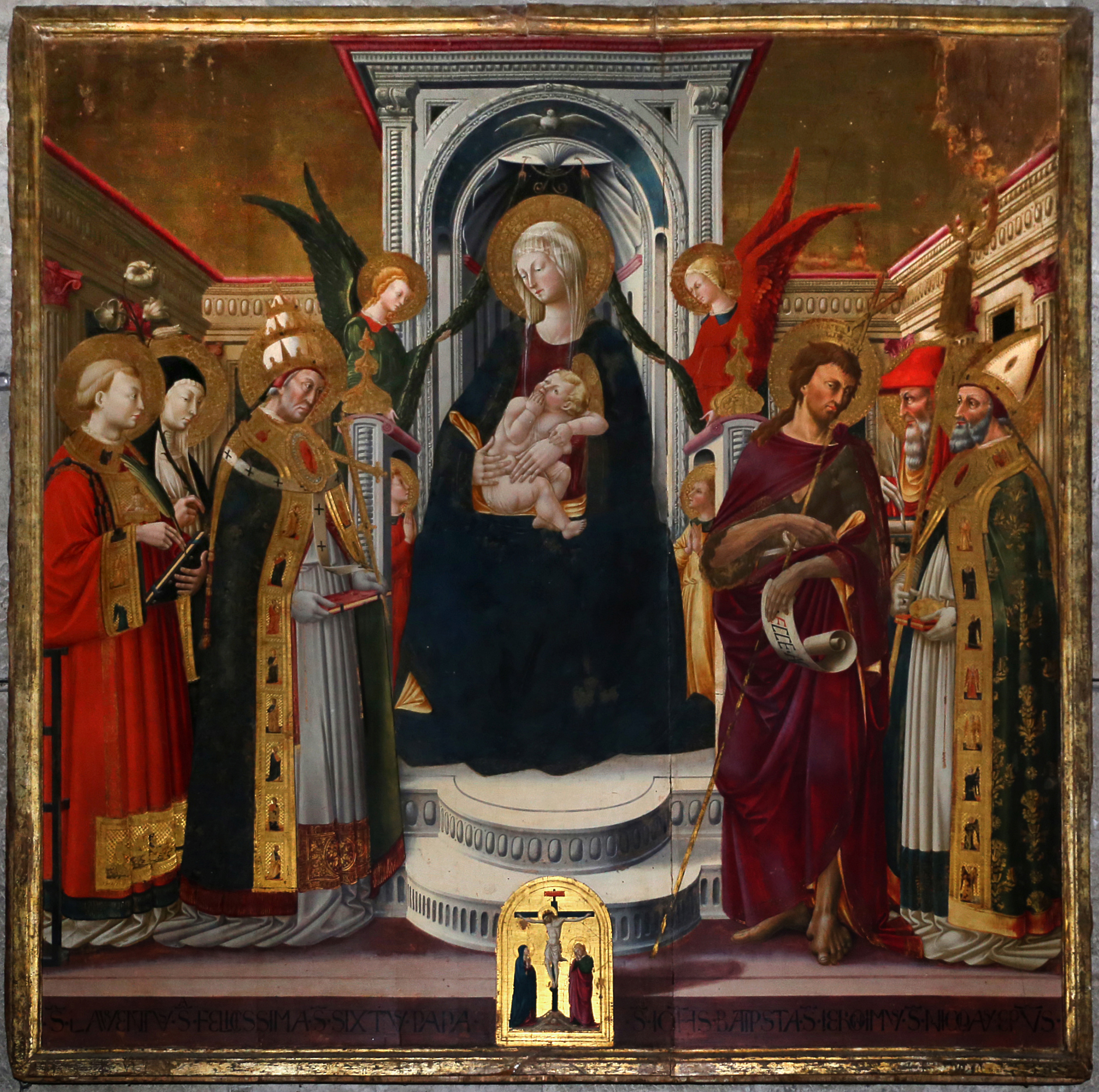
- Madonna and Child with Saints, Viterbo, Italy
- Born: Neri di Lorenzo; 1419; Florence Tuscany, Italy
- Died: 1491 (aged 71–72); Florence Tuscany, Italy
- Known for: Painting
- Movement: Gothic

Neri di Bicci (1419–1491) was an Italian painter active in his native Florence. A prolific painter of mainly religious themes, he studied under his father, Bicci di Lorenzo, who had in turn studied under his father, Lorenzo di Bicci. The three thus formed a lineage of great painters that began with Neri's grandfather.

Neri di Bicci's main works include a fresco of Saint John Gualbert Enthroned with Ten Saints (1455) for the church of San Pancrazio, Florence (now in the nearby church of Santa Trinita), an Annunciation (1464) for Santa Maria alla Campora (now in the Florentine Academy), two altarpieces (one dated 1452) in the Diocesan Museum of San Miniato, a Coronation of the Virgin (1472) on the high altar of the abbey church at San Pietro a Ruoti (Bucine), and the Madonna with Child with Four Female Saints (1474) on loan to the Sacred Art Museum in Casole d'Elsa from the Pinacoteca Nazionale in Siena.

Neri is most famous for his Ricordanze, a series of journals he kept from 1453 until 1475 in which he chronicled the numerous types of commissions he accepted (altarpieces, small devotional panels, frescoes, shop signs, candlesticks, painted sculpture, etc.) and the rates of remuneration for his work, as well as his pupils, collaborators and patrons. The Ricordanze are the most extensive such document from the fifteenth century. They are today preserved in the library of the Uffizi Gallery.

== Early life ==
When Neri was born in 1419, he was the third in line of the Bicci family of artists. His grandfather Lorenzo di Bicci was a contemporary of Jacopo di Cione and Niccolò di Pietro Gerini, and a prolific painter of altarpieces (Empoli, Collegiata di Sant'Andrea; Florence, Galleria dell'Accademia; Loro Ciuffena, Santa Maria Assunta), frescoes and small-scale devotional panels for domestic interiors (Baltimore, Walters Art Museum; Nashville, Vanderbilt University Fine Arts Gallery; San Francisco, Legion of Honor; Rome, Museo di Palazzo Venezia). Neri's father and teacher, Bicci, was also an artist who was even more prolific than his father. Neri spent much of his youth in Bicci's workshop painting in a very similar style. In 1434, at the age of fifteen, Neri joined the Florentine painters' confraternity the Compagnia di San Luca.

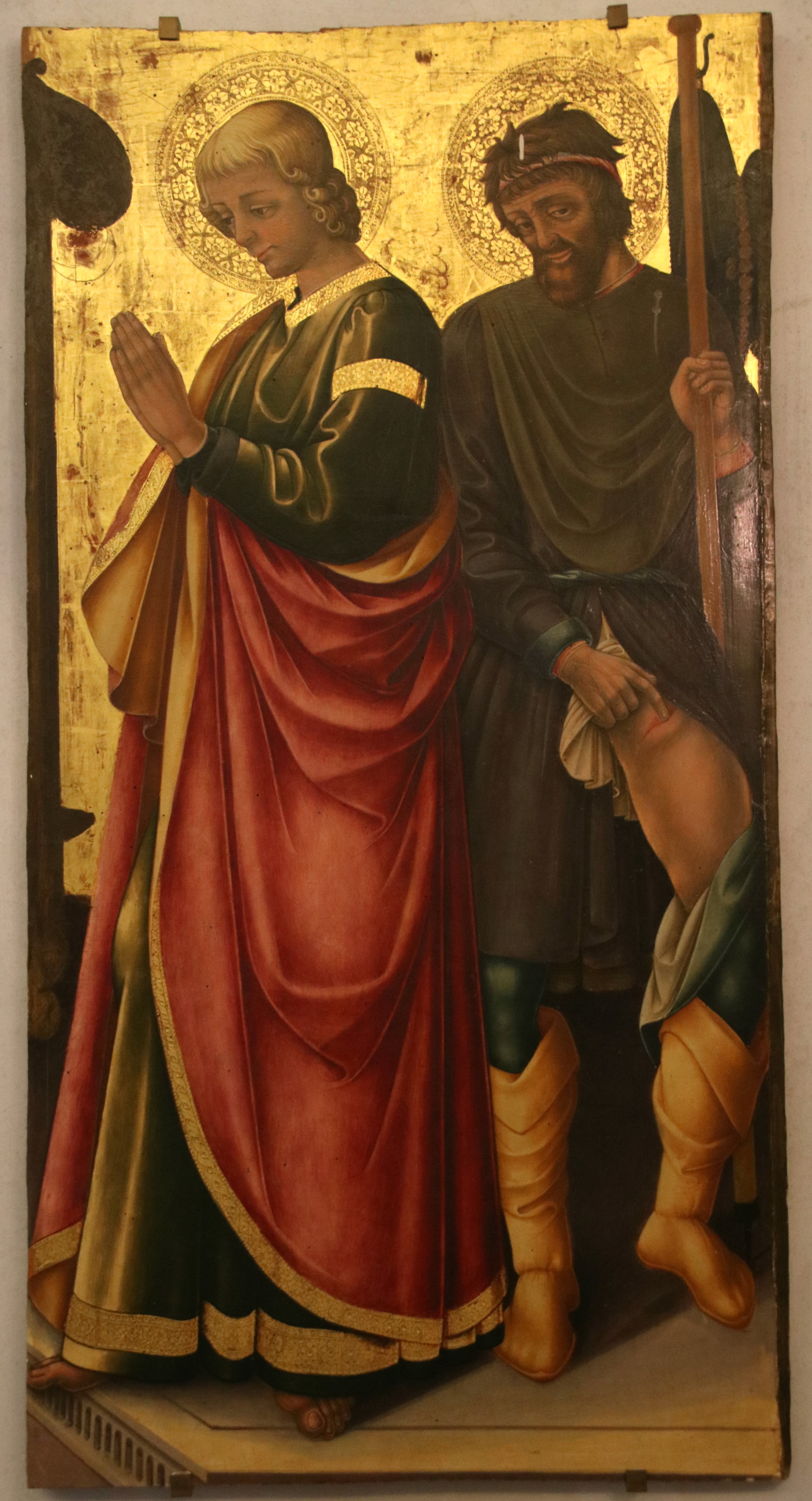
1.1 Saint John and Saint Roch, Tavernelle Val di Pesa, Florence

== Adult life ==
Neri created works for all different social classes, ranging from the upper bourgeoisie to Florentine guild members, government offices, prominent local basilicas and humble provincial churches. His first documented work is from 1439, when he collaborated with his father on the trompe-l’oeil funerary monument to Luigi Marsili (1342–94) in Florence Cathedral. In 1440, Neri dated the Annunciation in San Angelo a Legnaia, in which he collaborated with his father.

By 1444, Neri was working more or less independently. An early work from this year is the triptych of the Virgin and Child Enthroned with Ten Saints for the chapel of the Villani family in Santissima Annunziata, Florence. The central panel of this altarpiece is now at the Museum of Fine Arts in Boston, while the side panels are at the Allen Memorial Art Museum of Oberlin College and the Galleria dell'Accademia in Florence. It is clear in this work that Neri's style had evolved and moved away from the style of his father. The composition is perhaps inspired by the work of Fra Filippo Lippi, while the figures show similarities with the art of Paolo Schiavo. In 1447 Neri painted a predella, now lost, for the church of San Martino in Maiano.

Neri's father died in 1452, leaving Neri in charge of the workshop. Also in this year, Neri was commissioned to create a fresco cycle illustrating Scenes from the Life of Saint Giovanni Gualberto for the Spini family chapel in Santa Trìnita. The frescoes were specifically commissioned by Giovanni Spini and Salvestro Spini. The only part of this decoration that survives today is the Annunciation over the chapel's entrance arch. The Assumption of the Virgin originally on the altar in this chapel (Ottawa, National Gallery of Canada) shows the clear influence of Fra Angelico and Domenico Veneziano.

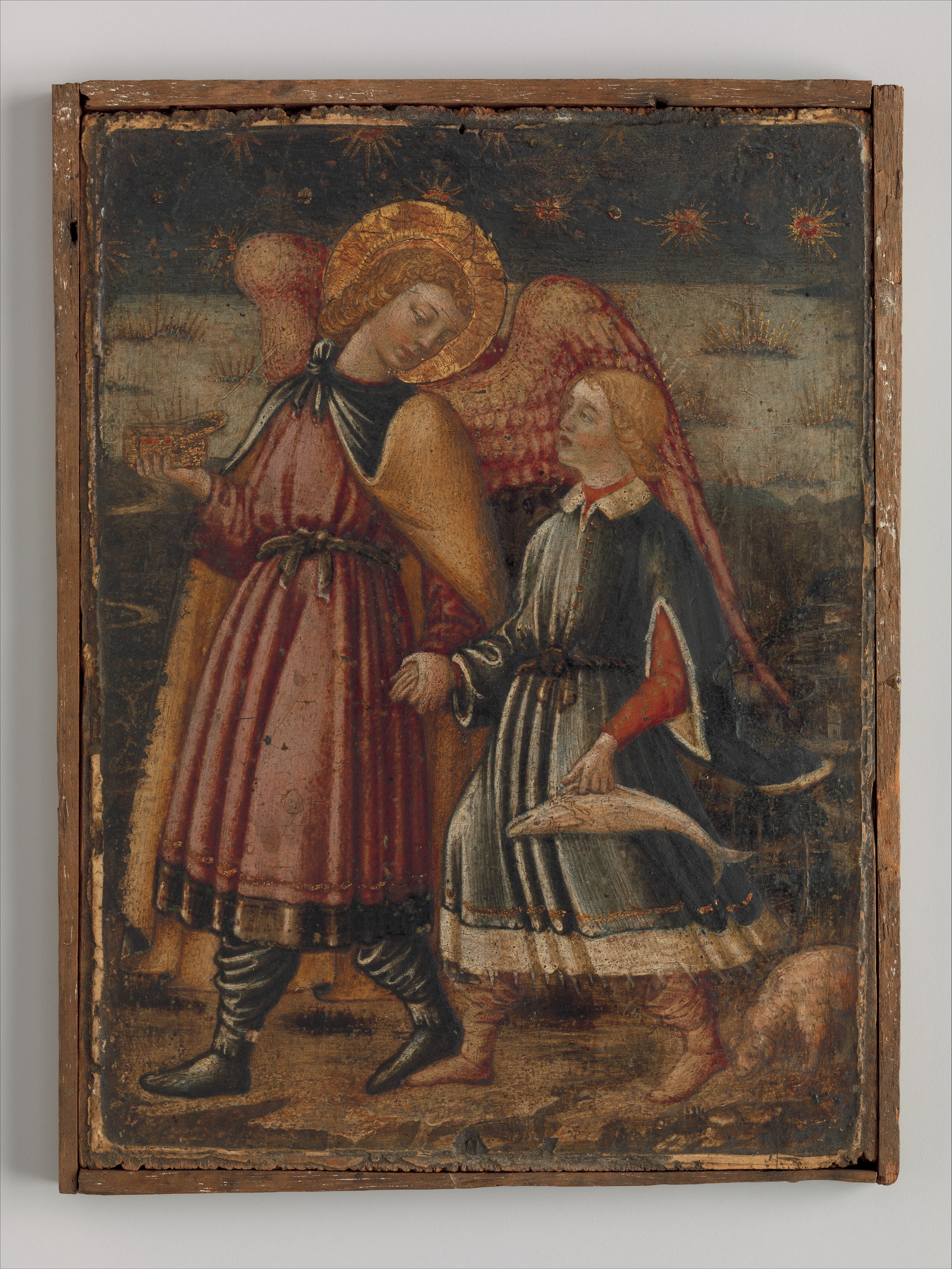
1.2 The Archangel Raphael and Tobias, date unknown, Metropolitan Museum of Art: The Robert Lehman Collection http://www.metmuseum.org/Collections/search-the-collections/459014

== Works ==
These two Archangel Raphael and Tobias pieces were most likely created one after the other. 1.1 was created in the workshop between 1457 and 1463, while 1.2 was created in the early 1460s. The subject of the Archangel was extremely popular in Florence in the 1460s, and artists such as Francesco Botticini and Piero del Pollaiuolo illustrated this bible story. Although some works similar to the two seen here can be attributed to Jacopo da Sellaio, a higher proportion are from Neri's workshop. 1.1 and 1.2 are clearly very similar in terms of style and the way the characters are arranged. They are both by Neri and were created in his shop, possibly with the help of some assistants. Both works feature the Archangel on the left looking back at Tobias while holding his hand. There is also a small white dog in both, and the Archangel is holding a box in his right hand. In 1.1, the chin, forehead, and hair of Tobias and the face of the Archangel have all been reinforced, and the fingers of the Archangel's right hand and Tobias's left hand are modern. The painting is overall covered with dirt and unevenly preserved, and only the subsidiary parts of the picture are well preserved. The box and upper part of the fish have also been regilt. 1.2 is considerably better preserved, but still covered in a discoloured varnish. The profile of Tobias had to be reinforced, and there was a hole above the right wing of the archangel that was filled. The gold leafing on the halo is worn down, but the gilding of the stars and aureole of Tobias is still intact.

The most prestigious commission of the 1450s period was a tabernacle that held a copy of Justinian's Digest in Greek. It was located in Sala dell’Udienza, in the Palazzo della Signoria and depicted Moses and the Four Evangelists, but was later destroyed. On 25 November 1459, Neri received a commission for an altarpiece depicting the Coronation of the Virgin with Eleven Saints, now located in the Acadamia of Florence, for the church of the monastery of Santa Felice. This work is notable due to the large scale of the piece and the number of characters represented. It illustrates an emblematic medieval background, and on top of that, Neri placed modern elements.

In 1933, it was published that the curator of the Museum of Fine Arts in Moscow, Victor Lasareff, had identified two new panel paintings that were created by Neri di Bicci. The first painting identified is "Madonna della Cintola", which was formerly recorded as painted by an unknown artist. The Madonna della Cintola is in good condition and depicts the Madonna in the middle with Saint Julian and Saint Thomas on either side of her, along with a few other unidentifiable characters. The painting is created in a cold light and uses varied colours which are not blended, but each have their own bold separate colour. There are two artistic styles used on the faces of the characters. The Madonna and the angels, St. Julian, and St. Thomas have flat faces with only moderate use of light and shade. The rest have more “plastic” faces with sharply drawn wrinkles. This painting is most similar to Neri's "Santa Felicita with Her Seven Sons", which was created for the church of Santa Felicita in Florence in 1464 (1.3). Both feature characters who have big, separated ringlets in their hair. The second painting identified is "The Madonna with a Child holding a Pomegranate". It differs from the Madonna della Cintola in that it has much richer colours, especially the faces, which have a more pinkish yellow. The Madonna's face in particular has much more realistic shading and lighting, making her face look more rounded rather than flat. The paintings were able to be identified due to the unique artistic style of Neri, which, as seen in this painting, contains long, narrow eyes half covered by heavy eyelids, finely arched eyebrows, and long, thin fingers with square nails. Also, whenever Neri depicts a Madonna, she has an oval, elongated face. Neri also always creates robes in the same style, thickly laying on the paint and giving the impression that the robe is stiff, almost as if it were made of metal.

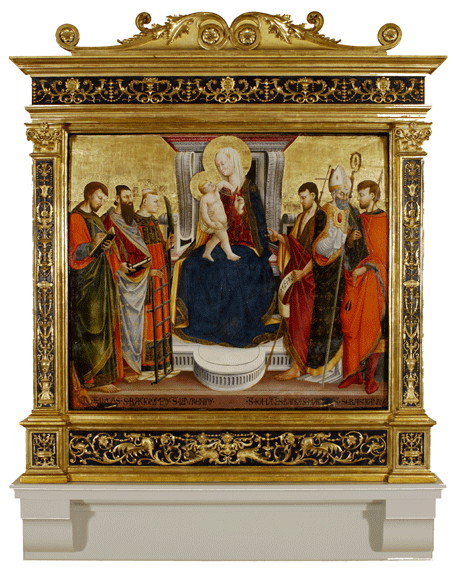
Virgin and Child with Six Saints (1456). Chapel of St. James Cathedral, Seattle. http://www.stjames-cathedral.org/Tour/renaissance.htm

On 6 August 1456, Neri di Bicci received a commission from Bartolomeo di Lucha Martini for an altarpiece of the Virgin and child with six saints. This commission has been identified with the painting now hanging in the chapel of St. James Cathedral in Seattle. It is one of the few works of Neri di Bicci in the United States. The painting underwent significant restoration at the Seattle Art Museum in 2004. The St. James Cathedral altarpiece depicts the Virgin and Child in the center, flanked by saints: Luke, Bartholomew, and Lawrence on the left, John the Baptist, Martin, and Sebastian on the right. The bent arm of the infant Christ is unusual in Neri di Bicci's work—the nursing infant reaches into his mother's blouse, suggesting the Virgin lactans, or nursing Virgin.

On 6 June 1460, Neri was commissioned by Bartolommeo Lenzi to create an altarpiece for the church of the Innocents. Neri chose to depict a Coronation of the Virgin with Saints. This panel was clearly inspired by works of Andrea del Castagno, with the figures portrayed as freer than normal and other stylistic similarities.

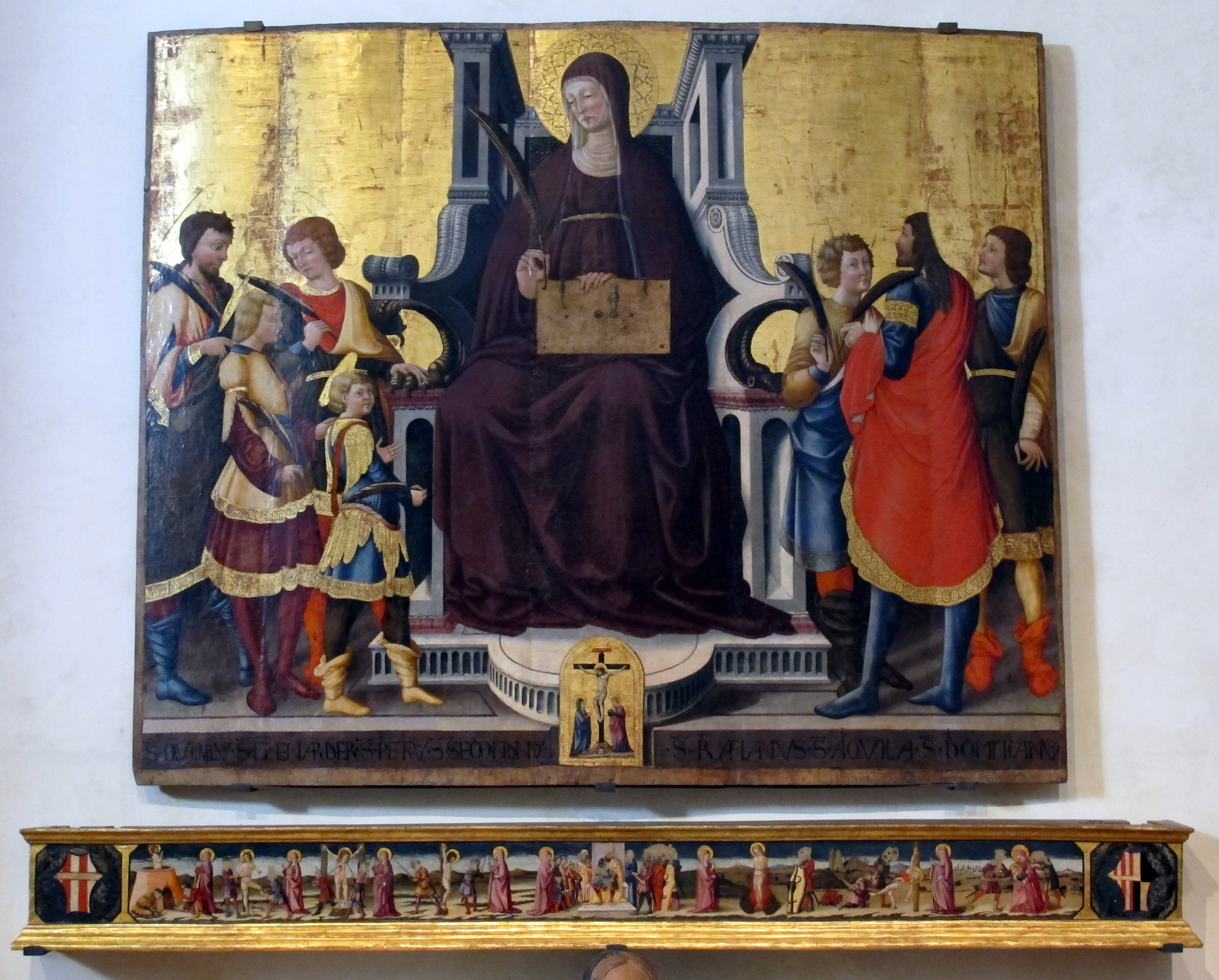
1.3 Santa Felicita with Her Seven Sons, 1464, Santa Felicita Church, Florence

In 1471, Neri was commissioned to create an altarpiece for the Palla family chapel in the Santo Spirito in Florence. In this time period, it was very common for families of a high status to have their personal chapel in a larger church. The chapels would typically be located on the left and right sides of the aisle where they could be easily viewed by worshippers. Having a personal chapel showed off a family's personal wealth and at the same time showed how charitable they were by creating a chapel that the people of their city could use. Historians know that 1.4 was truly painted by Neri due to a record made in his workshop book on May 7, 1471, which states, “began to paint for Mariotto di marco della palla an altarpiece on which will appear the Angel Raphael and Tobias, to the right the Angel Michael, and to the left Angel Gabriel; in addition below the feet of Angel Raphael, a small picture representing the crucifixion with St. John and the Virgin.” It was also recorded that three smaller pictures were supposed to be underneath the main one, but they have been lost. This picture is famous for the way Neri expertly depicts the energetic figure of Angel Michael versus the quiet thoughtfulness of Angel Gabriel and the helpfulness of Angel Raphael. This picture was created using tempera on panel and has red undertones throughout. These red undertones are important because they contrast with the gold, making it seem brighter. This particular subject was most likely chosen because the Palla family had a young family member who was going off to a job or to university. It was very common at this time that when a younger member of the family left home, a picture would be ordered and Tobias would be depicted as the person who was about to leave. The Archangel Raphael helps Tobias in his life, and the family hopes the same will happen for their child.

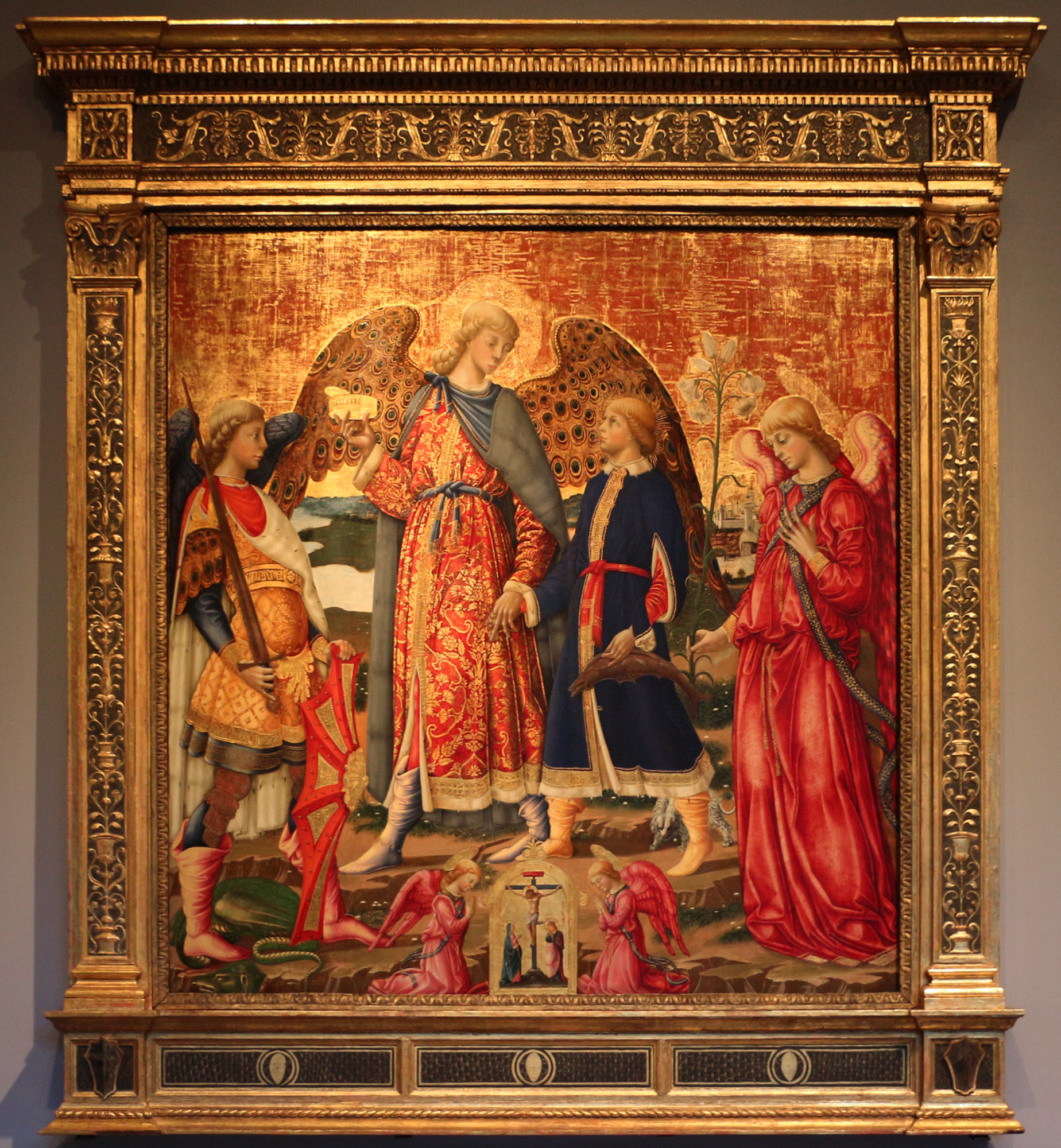
1.4 Tobias and Three Archangels, 1471, Detroit Institute of Arts

Raphael and Tobit also appear in the predella of the artist's Madonna and Child with Two Saints (c.1475). One of the last records we have of Neri is from April first, 1488, when he received 8 bushels of grain in Santa Maria Monticelli as payment for a painting. Later on May tenth, the same year, he was paid for an untraceable frontal portraying the "Legend of St Francis" and the "Building of the Santa Maria degli Angeli".

== Style ==
Neri is described as a conservative artist of his time, still using the old gold ground technique. Giotto was the father of this type of gold art, creating it in the 13th century, and therefore Vasari refers to Neri as being one of the last Giottoesque painters. Neri's paintings were without emotion and created in an almost mechanical fashion. He painted the same subject over and over again, often only changing small details like the clothes they were wearing, but keeping all of the same characters in the same forms. All of Neri's paintings contain identical details such as long narrow eyes half covered by heavy eyelids, finely arched eyebrows, straight noses, sharply outlined mouths, and long thin fingers with square nails. Also, as stated previously, Neri is known for always depicting the Madonna with an oval, elongated face. Neri also always creates robes in the same style, thickly laying on the paint and giving the impression that the robe is stiff, almost as if it were made of metal. Neri had a stylistic change in 1452. Before this date, his works were often unsophisticated, yet contained ornamental motifs and many figures and had the artistic freshness of a young artist. After 1452, he began adopting forms from artists in the Renaissance, which, by the end of his career, eventually became tired and repetitive.

== Workshop ==
The first pupil of Neri's workshop, Cosimo Rosselli, began his apprenticeship at the young age of fourteen as documented on 4 May 1453. Years later, in 1460, the cousin of Cosimo, Bernardo di Stefano Rosselli, would collaborate with Neri on a series of paintings in the workshop. In 1458, Giusto d’Andrea began his to study as an apprentice to Neri and stayed for at least two years before joining the confraternity Neri was a member of, la Compagnia de San Luca. Francesco Botticini also began studying art at Neri's workshop after signing a one-year contract. Despite this contract, Francesco decided to leave Neri's workshop in July 1460 after only nine months of training, presumably due to some prior training from his father, who was a painter. Botticini would go on to become an extremely successful artist mentioned in Vasari's Lives of the Artists and painting the famous Assumption of the Virgin with Saints and the Angelic Hierarchies. Neri's pupils also include Stagio di Taddeo d'Antonio, Dionigi d'Andrea di Bernardo di Lottino, and Giosuè di Santi. The workshop is recorded as creating more than fifty Madonna and child paintings and the Virgin with the girdle seven times. The workshop was so popular, in fact, that on 22 November 1458, Neri had to rent a second workshop at the Porta Rossa in the centre of Florence. This gave him and his pupils more room to work on larger paintings and to take on more clients.

== The Recordanze (The Records) ==
The records are an 189-page-long workshop diary that began on 10 March 1453 and continued until 24 April 1475. These are the most extensive 15th-century documents historians have relating to a 15th-century painter and are still preserved in the library of the Uffizi Gallery. The one that is preserved is likely the fourth diary labelled "D" and referring to diary "C" often. The record included all types of information about the art pertaining to the workshop, including commissions for paintings, the names, professions and social status of patrons, descriptions and dimensions of works, techniques and colours used, type of carpentry, the style of frames, the scenes depicted, and prices. Because of this record, we know of many of the works of Neri, even ones that to this day have not been located. We also know that the workshop took commissions from all types of people in Italy, such as artisans of the Chianti region, noble families like the Spini, Soderini and Rucellai, small Florentine shopkeepers, abbots of the Vallombrosans of Santa Trìnita and S Pancrazio, and ordinary parish priests from the surrounding countryside. Neri died in 1491 and left behind a legacy in his pupils and in his four sons and two daughters. None of his children became artists, ending the legacy started by his grandfather, and instead turned to the mercantile business. Neri is buried in the Saint Mary of Carmine church. To this day, he is less famous for being an artist of talent, but instead for keeping these meticulous records of his works and for the sheer number of works his workshop created.

== Posthumous reputation ==
None of Neri di Bicci's sons became painters, making the painter the last in the artistic dynasty founded by his father. Giorgio Vasari devoted a joint biography to the Bicci in his "Lives of the Artists," in which he confusedly described Neri as Lorenzo's second son and thus the brother of Bicci. Much of Bicci's work was wrongly attributed by Vasari to Neri. These false attributions were corrected in 1768, with Domenico M. Manni's edition of Baldinucci's Notizie dei professori del disegno. This mistake was reiterated by Gaetano Milanesi in his 1878 commentary on Vasari's Vite, and by the early twentieth-century scholars who assembled Neri's corpus, such as Bernard Berenson.
