= San Giusto =

San Giusto may refer to:

- Italian ship San Giusto, a 1993 San Giorgio-class amphibious transport dock of the Italian Navy
- San Giusto, a transport ship, launched as SS Fürst Bismarck, seized by Italy at the end of World War I
- San Giusto, a neighbourhood of Pisa, Tuscany, Italy

== Buildings in Italy ==
- San Giusto Abbey (disambiguation), several buildings
- San Giusto Cathedral (disambiguation), several buildings
- San Giusto, Lucca, a church in Lucca, Province of Lucca, Tuscany
- San Giusto, Pievebovigliana, a church in Pievebovigliana, Province of Macerata, Marche
- San Giusto, Volterra, a church in Volterra, Province of Pisa, Tuscany

== See also ==
- San Giusto Canavese, a comune in the Metropolitan City of Turin, Piedmont, Italy
- Monte San Giusto, a comune in the Province of Macerata, Marche, Italy
- Justus (given name)
