= Etruria =

Region of Central Italy

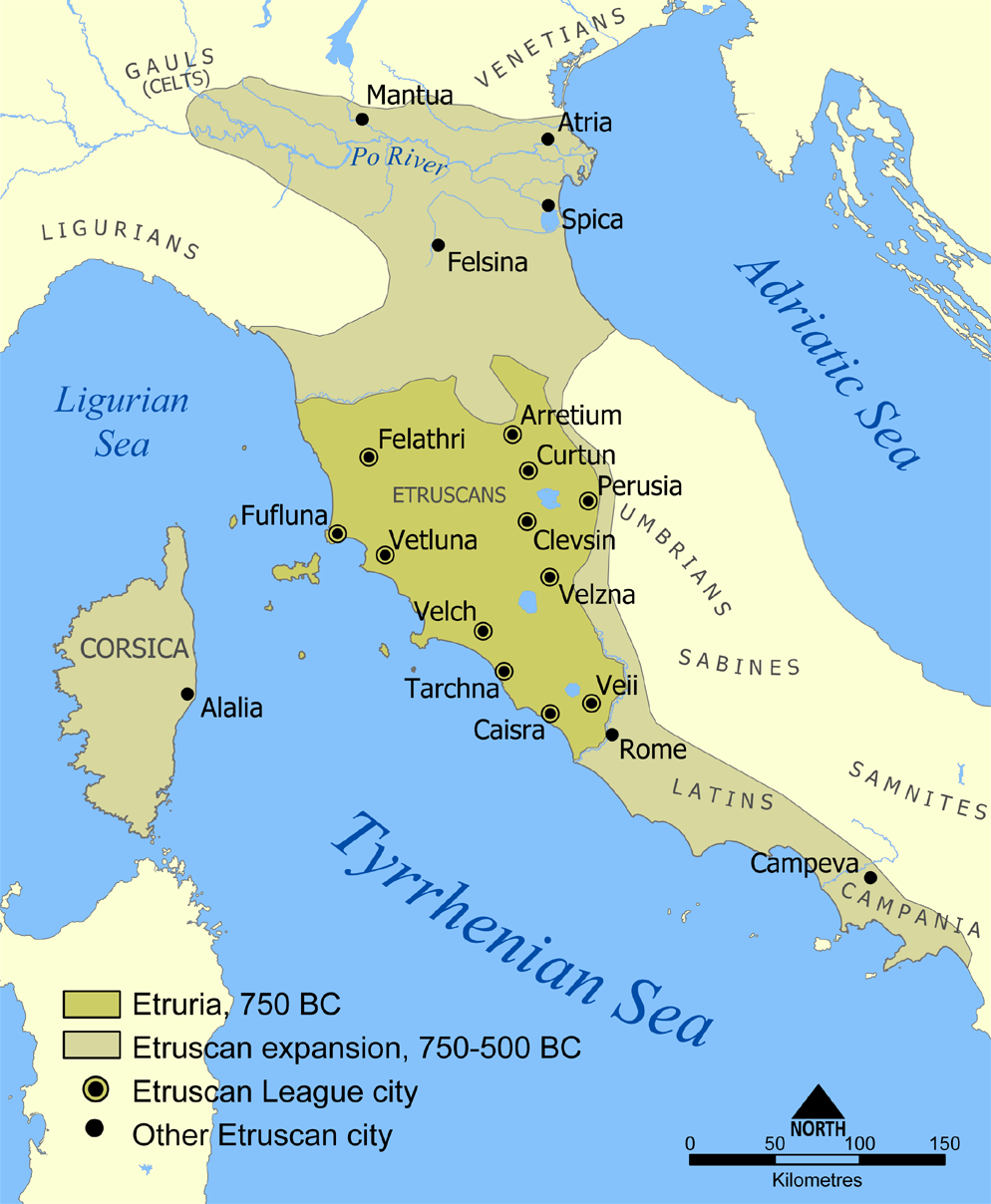
Map showing Etruria and Etruscan colonies as of 750 BC and as expanded until 500 BC

Etruria (/ɪˈtrʊəriə/ ih-TROOR-ee-ə) was a region of Central Italy delimited by the rivers Arno and Tiber, an area that covered what is now most of Tuscany, northern Lazio, and north-western Umbria. It was inhabited by the Etruscans, an ancient civilization that flourished in the area from around the 8th century BC until they were assimilated into the Roman Republic in the 4th century BC.

== Etruscan Etruria ==
The ancient people of Etruria are identified as Etruscans. Their complex culture centered on numerous city-states that arose during the Villanovan period in the ninth century BC, and they were very powerful during the Orientalizing Archaic periods.

The Etruscans were a dominant culture in Italy by 650 BC, surpassing other ancient Italic peoples such as the Ligures. Their influence may be seen beyond Etruria's confines in the Po River Valley and Latium, as well as in Campania and through their contact with the Greek colonies in Southern Italy (including Sicily). Indeed, at some Etruscan tombs, such as those of the Tumulus di Montefortini at Comeana (see Carmignano) in Tuscany, physical evidence of trade with Egypt has been found by archaeologists—fine Egyptian faience cups are an example. Such trade occurred either directly with Egypt or through intermediaries such as Greek or Phoenician sailors.

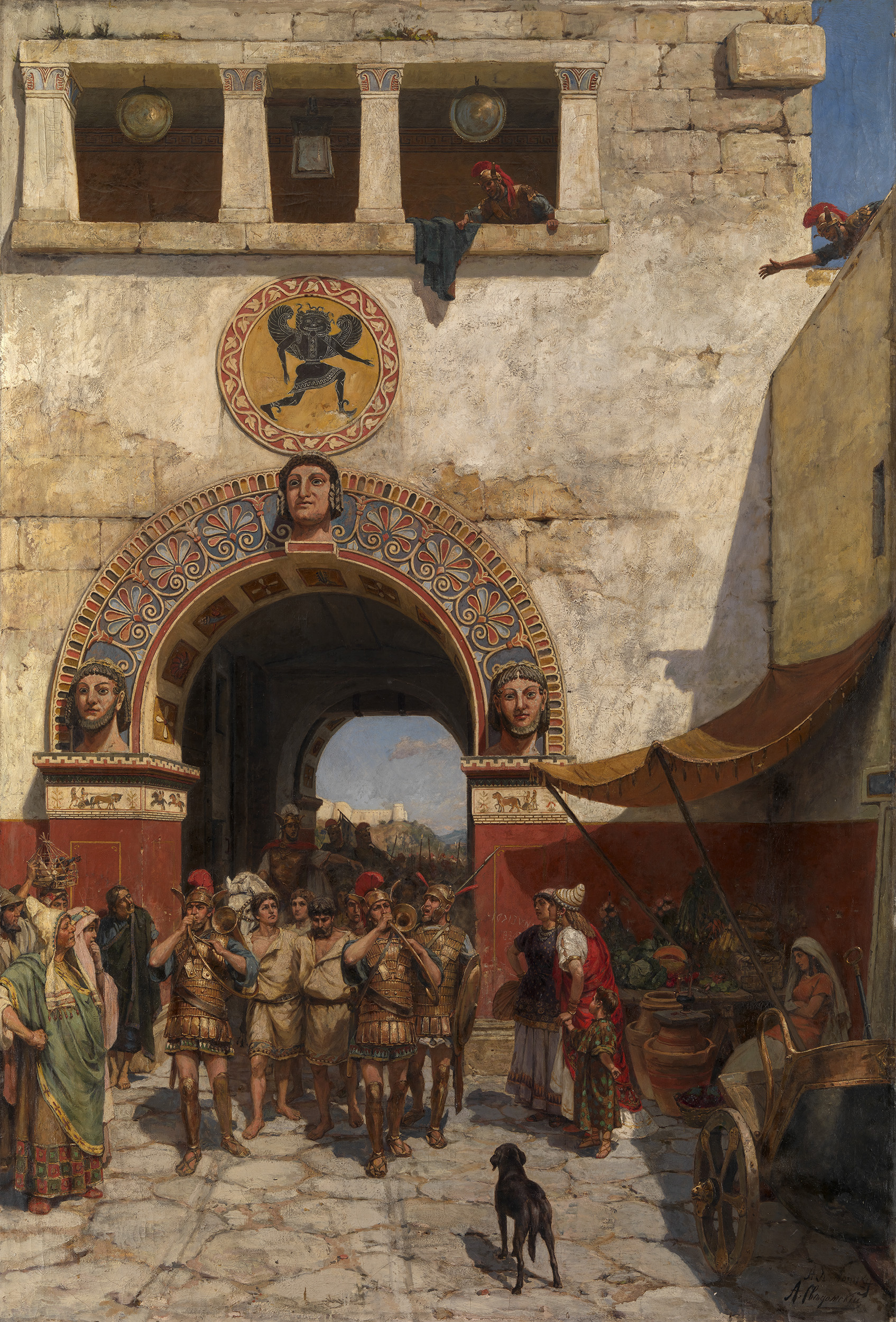
Gate in Volterra, Etruria or Returning With Captives by Aleksandr Svedomsky or Svedomskiy, 1884

Rome was influenced strongly by the Etruscans even though it was separated from the early boundary of Etruria by the Silva Ciminia, the Ciminian Forest. A series of Etruscan kings ruled Rome until 509 BC when the last Etruscan king, Lucius Tarquinius Superbus, was removed from power and the Roman Republic was established. The Etruscans are credited with influencing Roman architecture and ritual practice; it was under the Etruscan kings that important structures such as the Capitolium, Cloaca Maxima, and Via Sacra were realized.

The Etruscan civilization had a great influence on the culture of early Republican Rome, some of what later became the most symbolic traditions of the city. It also included the introduction of new foods, the Latin alphabet, the architecture, and engineering elements.

== Territorial subdivision of Etruria ==
Etruria usually is divided into two main territories, called Northern Etruria and Southern Etruria, to which must be added the northernmost territories are called Etruria Padana, and the southernmost territories are called Etruria Campana.

Etruria (proper)

- Northern Etruria - much of modern Tuscany, from the Arno river to the north, the Apennines to the east, and the Albegna river to the south of Tuscany;
- Inner Etruria - the Etruscan territories in the Perugia area in modern western Umbria
- Southern Etruria - small portions of the most southern areas of Tuscany, all of northern and central Lazio to the gates of Rome

Etruscan colonies

- Etruria Padana (Padanian Etruria) - territories in Emilia-Romagna and in the southern extremity of Lombardy and Veneto, in northern Italy
- Etruria Campana (Campanian Etruria) - territories in southern Lazio and Campania, in southern Italy

== Cities of Etruria ==
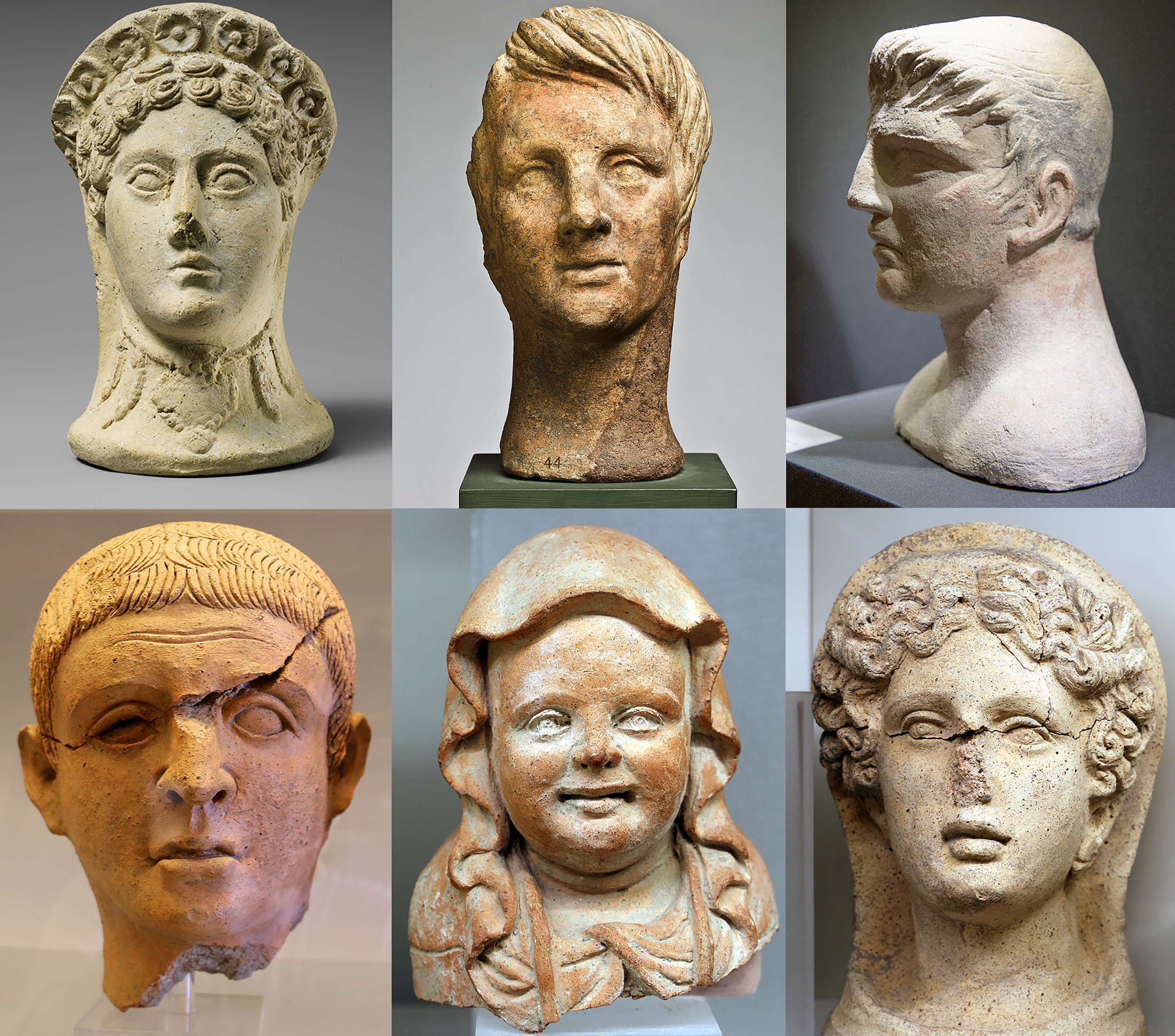
Etruscan votive heads found in various sanctuaries throughout Etruria and dating from the fourth century BC through the second century BC

Latin and Italian names are given between parentheses:

- Arritim (Arretium, Arezzo)
- Atria (Adria)
- Caisra (Caere, Cerveteri)
- Clevsin (Clusium, Chiusi)
- Curtun (Cortonium, Cortona)
- Felathri (Volaterrae, Volterra)
- Fufluna (Populonium, Populonia)
- Parusia (Perusia, Perugia)
- Tarchna (Volscian Anxur) (Tarracina, Terracina)
- Tarchnal (Tarquinii, Tarquinia)
- Veii (Veii, Veio)
- Vetluna (Vetulonium, Vetulonia), now part of the comune of Castiglione della Pescaia
- Vipsul (Faesulae, Fiesole)
- Velch (Vulci, Volci)
- Velzna (Volsiniia, Volsinii)

There was a period between 600 BC and 500 BC, during which twelve Etruscan city-states formed a loose confederation known as the Etruscan League. Etruscan was the official language for their meetings. When Etruria was conquered by the Roman Republic, Latin became the official language.

== Roman Etruria ==
In the Augustan organization of Roman Italy, Etruria was the name of a region (Regio VII). Its borders were the Tiber, the Tyrrhenian Sea, the Apuan Alps, and the Apennines. This is roughly coincident with those of Etruria before the Roman period that began in 509 BC.

== Etruria in modern history ==
The Grand Duchy of Tuscany (which existed 1569–1801 and 1814–1859) styled itself in Latin as Magnus Ducatus Etruriae (Grand Duchy of Etruria). The name Etruria also was applied to the Kingdom of Etruria, an ephemeral client state of Napoleon I of France that replaced the Grand Duchy between 1801 and 1807.

A particularly noteworthy work dealing with Etruscan locations is D. H. Lawrence's Sketches of Etruscan Places and Other Italian Essays.

British explorer George Dennis explored the ruins and sites of the region in the 1840s producing Cities and cemeteries of Etruria, published in 1848 by the British Museum, and including sketches by Dennis and Samuel James Ainsley.

== See also ==
- Padanian Etruria
- Etruscan history
- Etruscan origins
- Etruscan cities
- Etruscan civilization
- Etruscan society
- Etruscan language
- Etruscan mythology
- Kingdom of Etruria
- Tuscia

== Bibliography ==
- Bonfante, Giuliano; Bonfante, Larissa (2003). The Etruscan Language: an Introduction. Manchester: Manchester U.P. ISBN 0-7190-5540-7.
- Hall, John F., ed. (1996). Etruscan Italy: Etruscan Influences on the Civilizations of Italy from Antiquity to the Modern Era. Indiana University Press. ISBN 978-0-8425-2334-9. Chronology of Etruscan Italy, .
- "Etruria". Istituto dell'Enciclopedia Italiana (in Italian). Treccani.it.
