= Grotta Campana =

Etruscan burial complex in Lazio, Italy

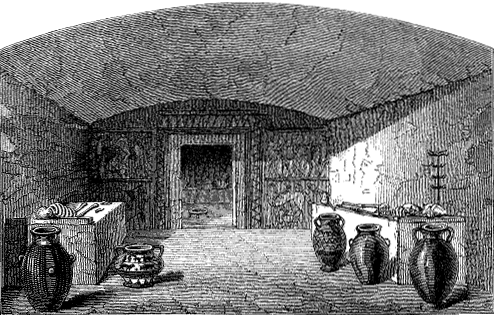
Overview of the tomb, from George Dennis's work The Cities and Cemeteries of Etruria, 1848

The Grotta Campana or Tomba Campana is an Etruscan tomb in Veii, which was rediscovered in 1843 by Giampietro Campana. For a while it was considered to contain the oldest known Etruscan frescoes. It is named after the owner of the land where and when the tomb was discovered. Because of a lack of inscriptions, it is unknown who was buried in this tomb. The tomb has not been dated with any precision.

== Description ==
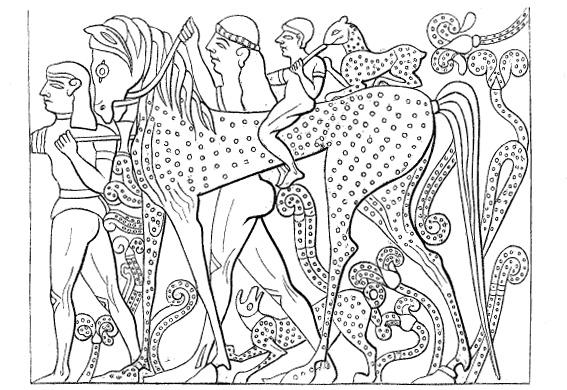
Painting of a horse

A 6 feet wide passage is hewn in the rocks in the side of the Poggio Michele hill, with a sculpted stone lion on each side of the entrance, and two similar ones at the actual entrance of the tomb. On the side facing the entrance are four paintings, placed one above another on each side of the door to the inner chamber. One is a three feet wide painting of a strange, multi-coloured horse with some humans and other animals. Beneath is a painting of other animals and legendary creatures. The opposite wall also has paintings in the same style. The sides, floor and ceiling are not decorated. The paintings are now badly faded, and the original colours are hardly discernable anymore. Though no longer considered to be the oldest known Etruscan paintings, they are still the earliest ones to display such a variety of forms in unified images instead of loose figures.

On both sides sits a stone ledge, which had skeletons on them at the time of the discovery. One of them was a warrior, and the other a woman, perhaps the wife of the warrior. On the floor are four large vases of about three feet high, containing human ashes. These vases are decorated with geometric patterns, while a number of smaller ones have paintings of humans, in one instance depicting some Bacchanal. Other pieces of furniture, including bronze mirrors, and some small sculptures, were found in the tomb as well.

The tomb also had a smaller inner chamber, decorated with two sculpted ceiling beams. On three sides, it had a ledge with earthenware vases and chests. These as well contained human ashes. The inner chamber did not contain any elaborate frescoes, only six depictions of multi-coloured discs on the side opposite the entrance.

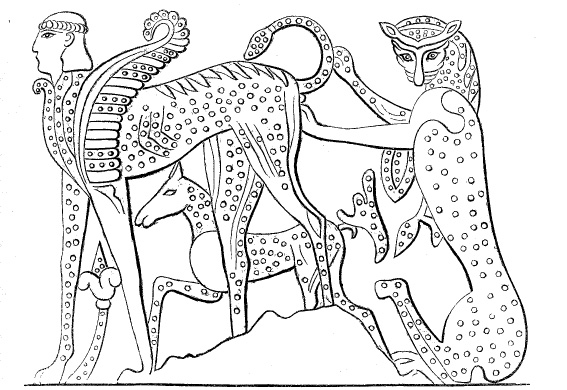
Second painting, to be found beneath the horse painting

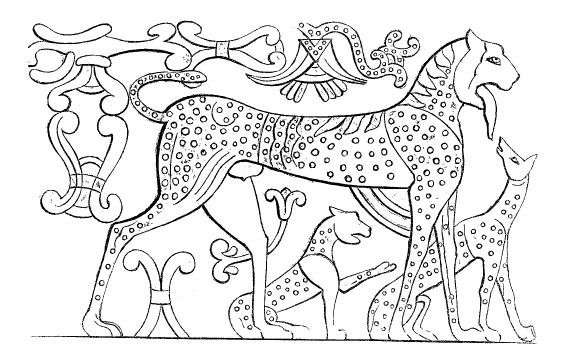
Other painting from this tomb

== Discovery ==
The tomb was found in 1842-1843 on the land of Marquis Gian Pietro Campana, a collector of all things Etruscan, who had opened the passageway to the tomb and installed a new door, but otherwise left it untouched. The first to describe it at length was George Dennis in 1848, in his work The Cities and Cemeteries of Etruria. He considered the paintings to be the oldest Etruscan paintings and possibly the oldest paintings in Europe known at the time.

The tomb has no inscriptions, and consequently it is not known who was buried there. The exact date of the tomb and its paintings and sculptures has been debated, with estimates ranging from the early seventh century BC, to the second half of the sixth century BC.

Doubt has been cast on the finds in this tomb, apart from the lion sculptures and the frescoes which are not in dispute.
