= Carmignano Visitation =

C. 1530 painting by Pontormo

Visitation
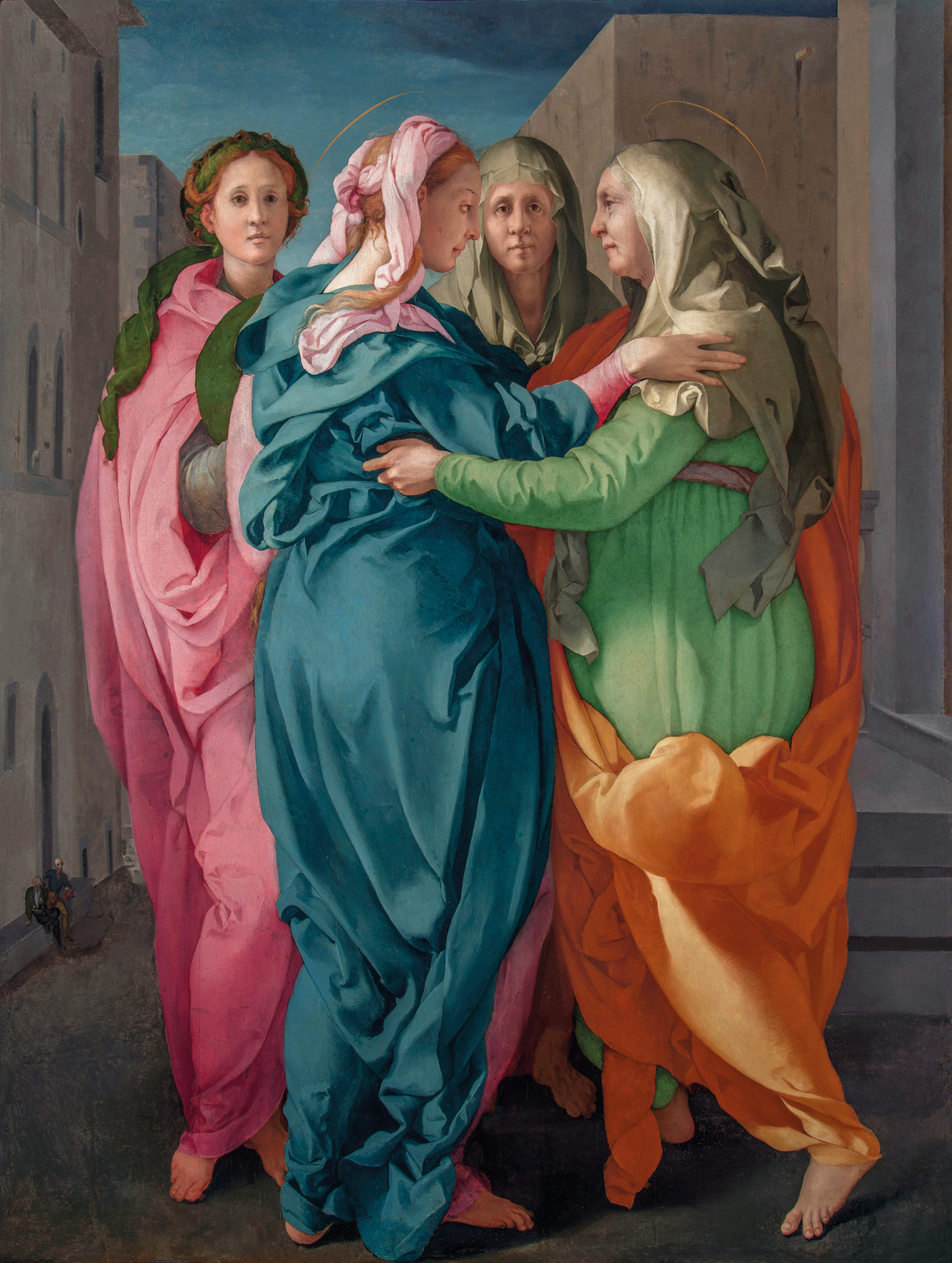
- Artist: Pontormo
- Year: c.1528-1530
- Medium: oil on panel
- Dimensions: 202 cm × 156 cm (80 in × 61 in)
- Location: Propositura dei Santi Michele e Francesco, Carmignano

The Carmignano Visitation is a c.1528-1530 oil on panel painting of the Visitation by Pontormo, now in the propositura dei Santi Michele e Francesco in Carmignano, west of Florence, Italy.

Unmentioned in Vasari's first version of the Lives of the Artists, Pontormo was included with named paintings in the second edition, but the list of masterpieces did not include this one, possibly because Vasari had never seen it. The painting was first documented in Giovanni Cinelli Calvoli's 1677 book Le bellezze della città di Firenze. Cinelli wrote that in the house of Senator Andrea Pitti there is 'a smaller modello of the Visitation of Pontormo, with extremely fine and meticulously painted drapery', and he believes the larger original is in the villa of the Pinadoria family in Camignano. In 1740 the painting was installed in its present location, somewhat unhappily with a large white with gold trim frame expansion to make it fit an existing altar that had its inscription rubbed off.

The painting is usually attributed to the years just after Pontormo's work on the Capponi Chapel. A preparatory drawing for it is now in the Uffizi, with the squaring for its transfer to the panel. Its rhombus composition is based on that of The Four Witches, a 1497 print by Dürer. In the foreground of the painting, we see Mary, St. Elizabeth, and two handmaids. While, on the left, in the background, there are two mysterious people to be identified, perhaps as St. Joseph and Zacharias. Originally meant for a Pinadori family altar in the church of St. Anne just outside Florence, it was never installed there; and remained in the Pinadori villa presumably until it was installed in the church where it is located today. The church of St. Anne was situated outside the city and was demolished before the painting could be installed. This has come to light through comparison of background building on the left with the view of Jacopo, de' Nerli's palace and the Porta San Frediano in Filippino Lippi's masterpiece in Santo Spirito, Florence.

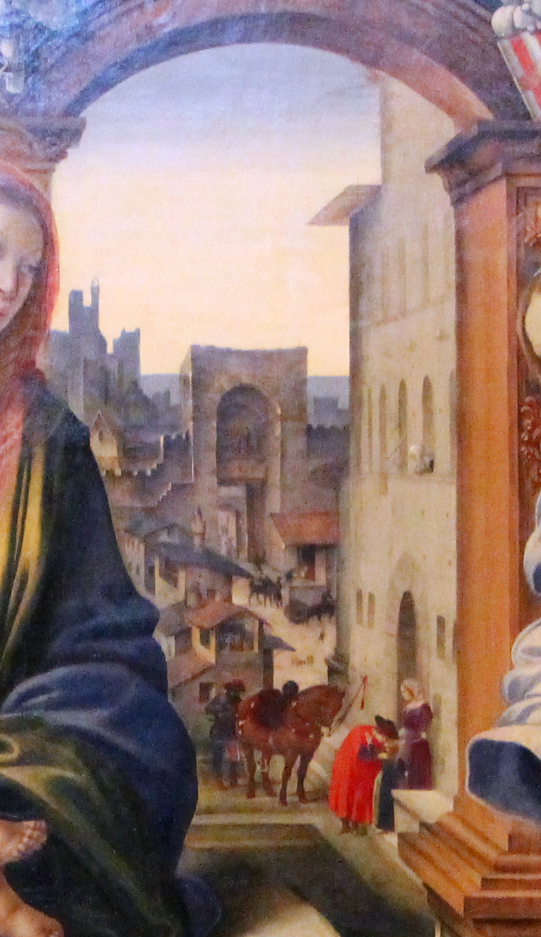
Porta San Frediano seen behind Jacopo, de' Nerli's palace in the 1490s, according to Fillipino Lippi

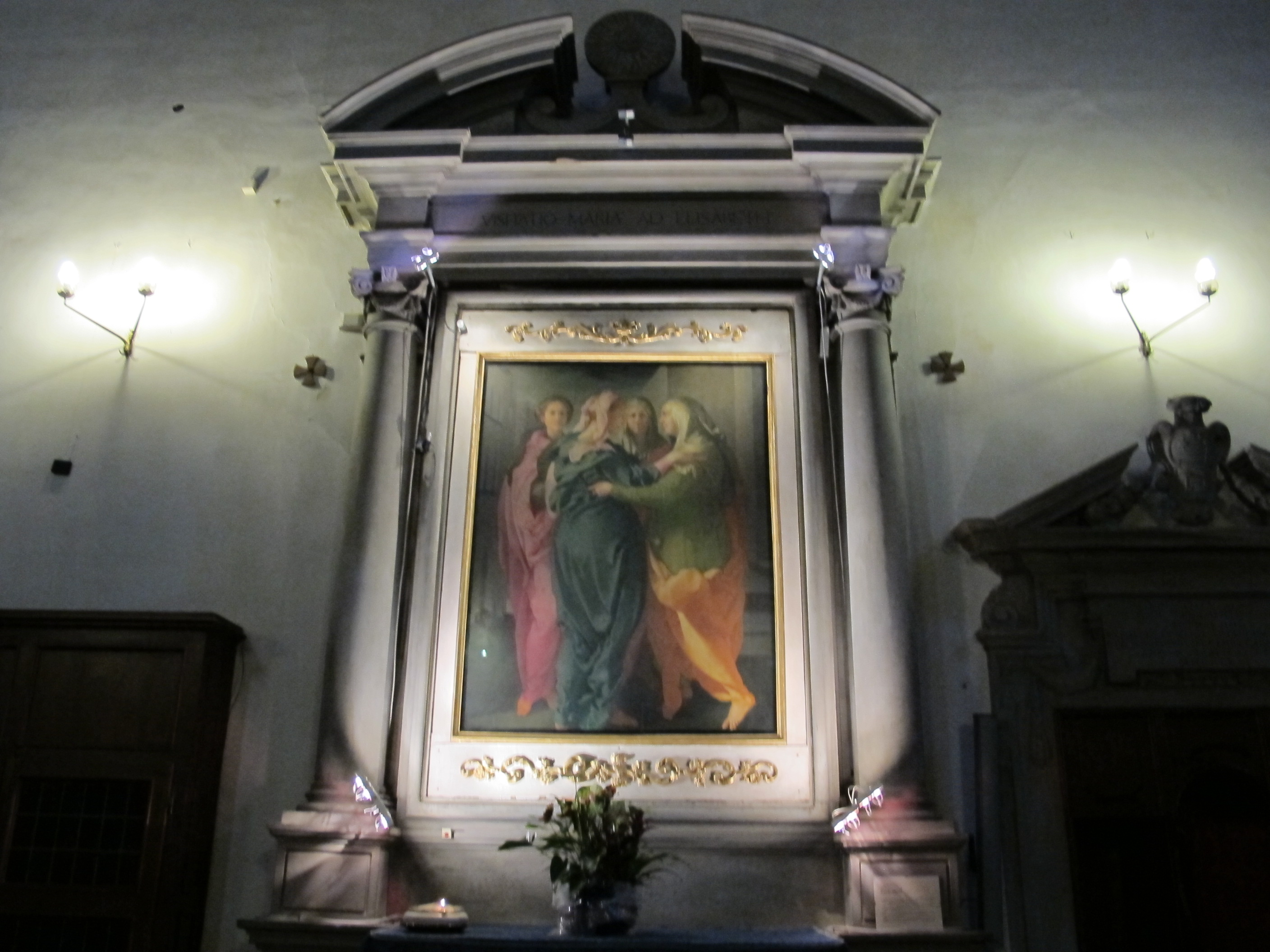
Painting as installed in Carmignano

In this detail view, Jacopo, de' Nerli, who commissioned the painting, can be seen with his horse departing and taking leave of his wife with another woman hanging out of the window. By echoing this detail, Pontormo paid hommage to Lippi.

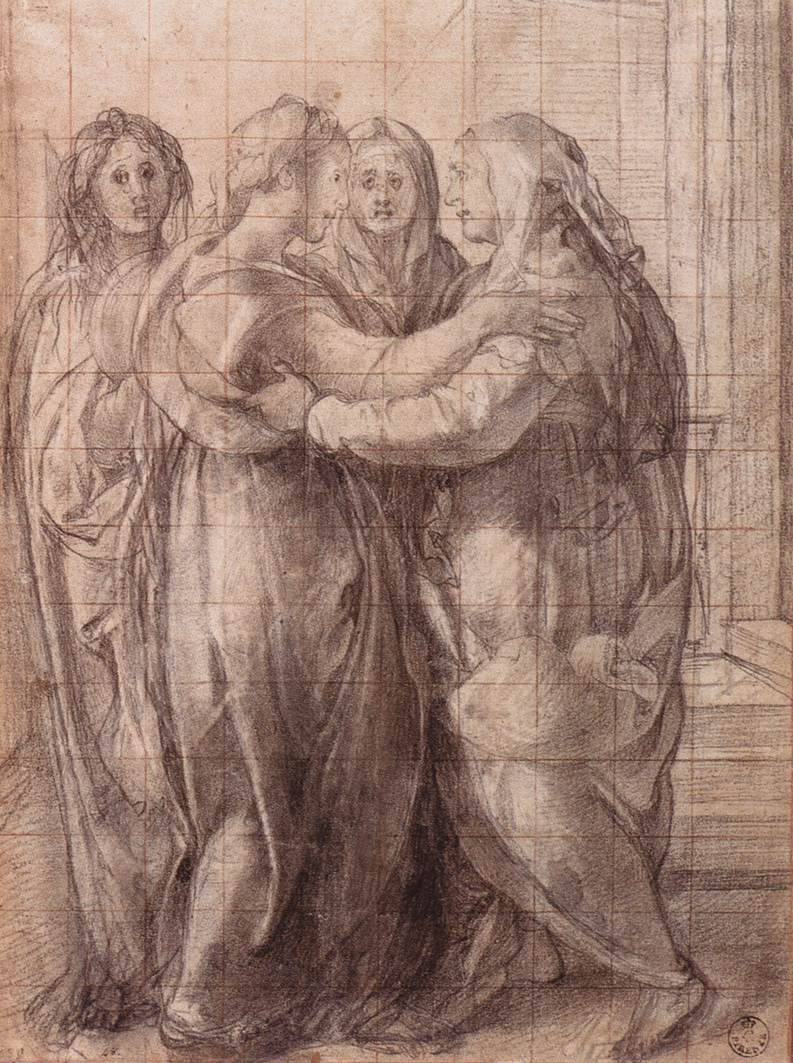
Pontormo's modello for the painting, which has unfortunately been trimmed on the left side to remove the hommage to Lippi, Uffizi, Gabinetto dei Disegni e delle Stampe, n. 461 F

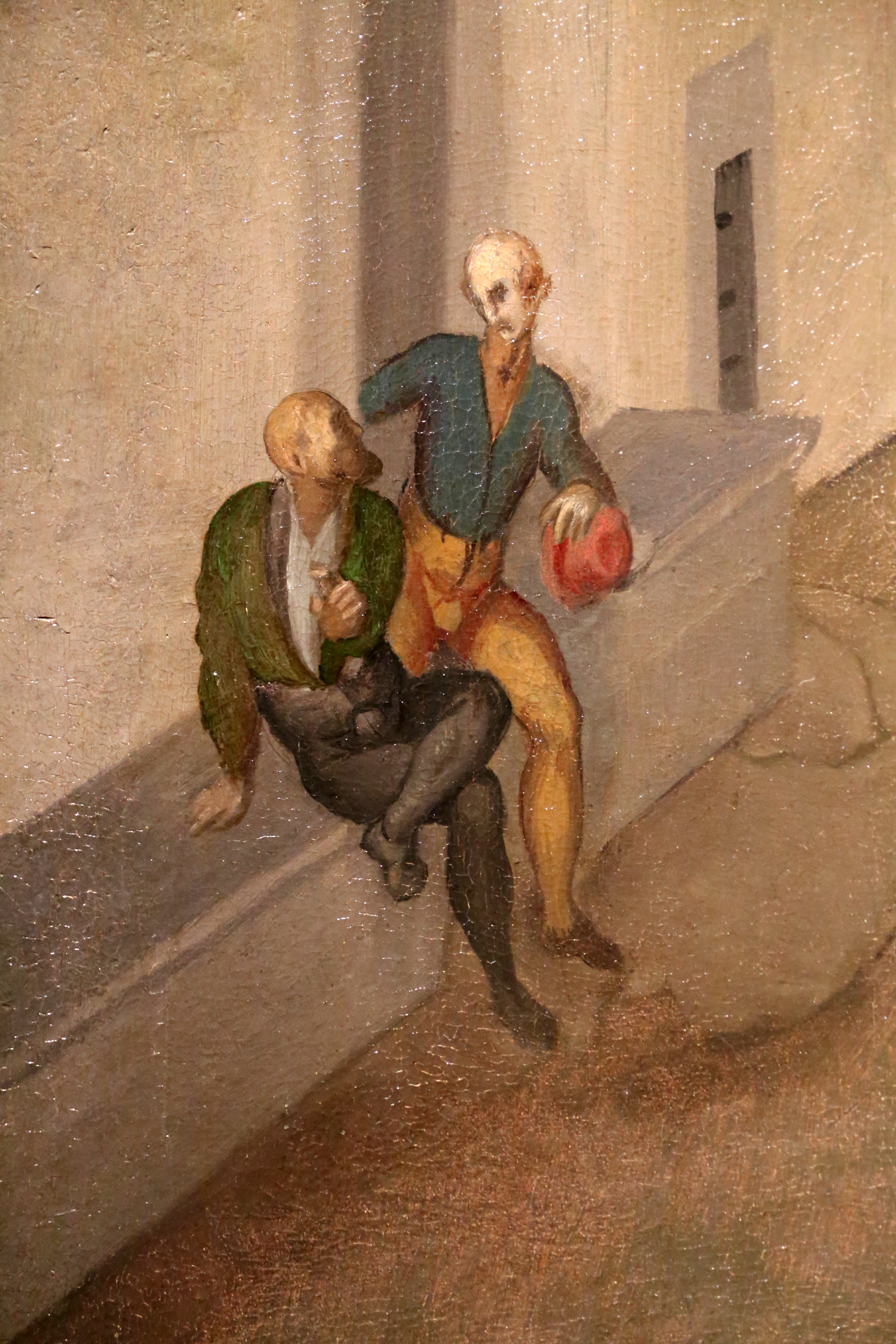
Detail of the two people in the lower left background identified by art historian Adriano Marinazzo as St. Joseph and Zechariah.

== Exhibitions ==
The painting was on show in the United States as part of the exhibition Pontormo: Miraculous Encounters, at The Morgan Library & Museum in New York (September 7, 2018, to January 6, 2019) and The J. Paul Getty Museum in Los Angeles (February 5, 2019, to April 28, 2019).

It inspired Bill Viola's video work The Greeting (1995), which for a time was exhibited in a room next to the painting. The painting has appeared in the temporary exhibitions Pontormo e Rosso Fiorentino. Divergenti vie della maniera (Palazzo Strozzi, Florence, 2014) and Bill Viola. Rinascimento elettronico (Palazzo Strozzi, Florence, 2017).
