= San Lorenzo, Carmignano =

Church building in Carmignano, Italy

Coordinates: 43°48′41″N 11°01′50″E

There is also a church of San Lorenzo in Carmignano near Foggia.

San Lorenzo is a romanesque-style, Roman Catholic rural parish church located on Via Montalbiolo #51 in the town of Carmignano, province of Prato, region of Tuscany, Italy.

== History ==
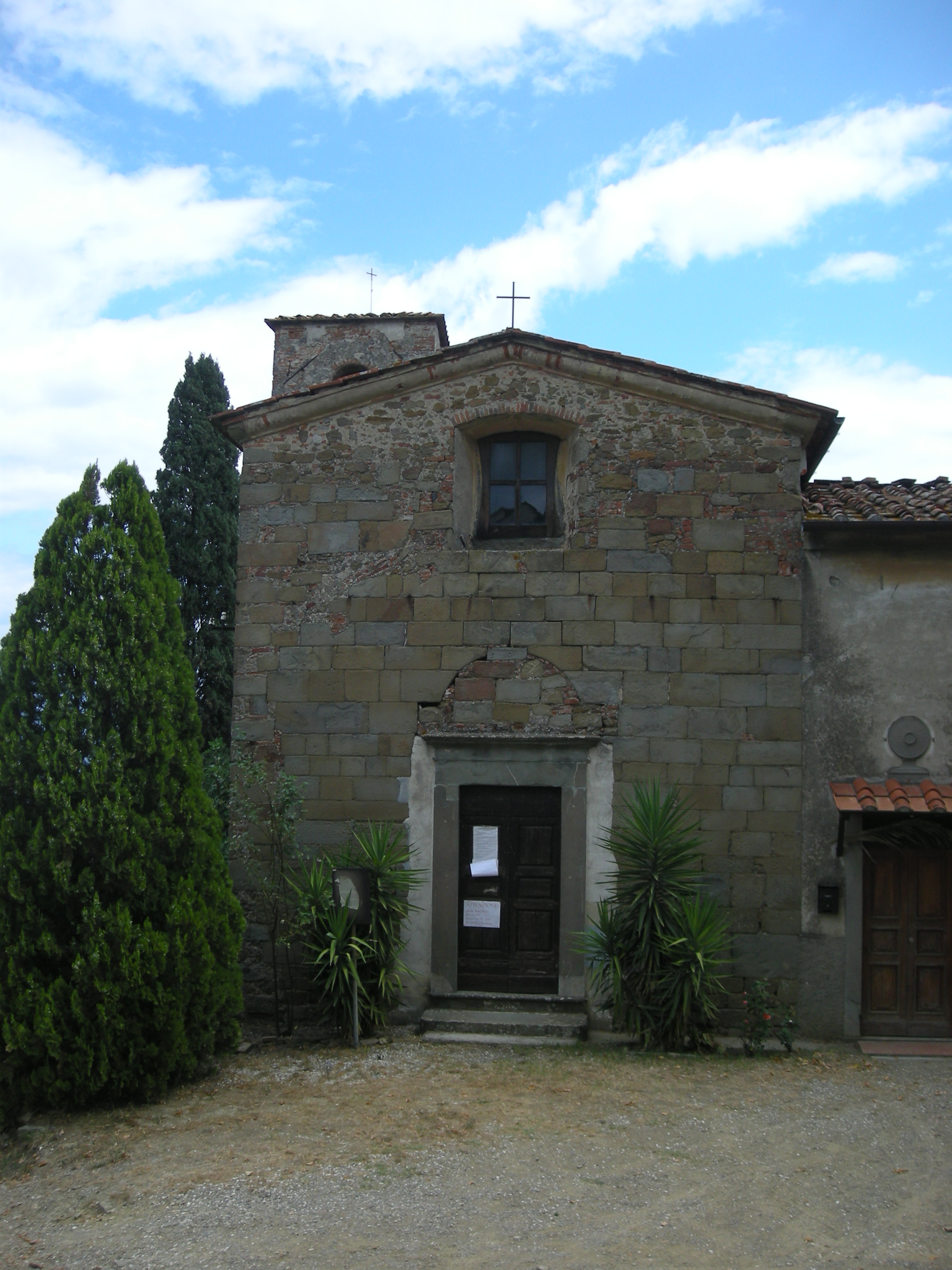

The stone church was erected in the 12th century, perhaps under the patronage of Countess Matilde di Canossa. It underwent modifications in the 16th and 17th centuries. Among the interior paintings is a canvas depicting St Lawrence (1605) by Giovanni Bizzelli. The main altarpiece is a Madonna and Child with Saints (1670) attributed to Simone Pignoni.
