= San Leonardo, Carmignano =

Have Nice good Look

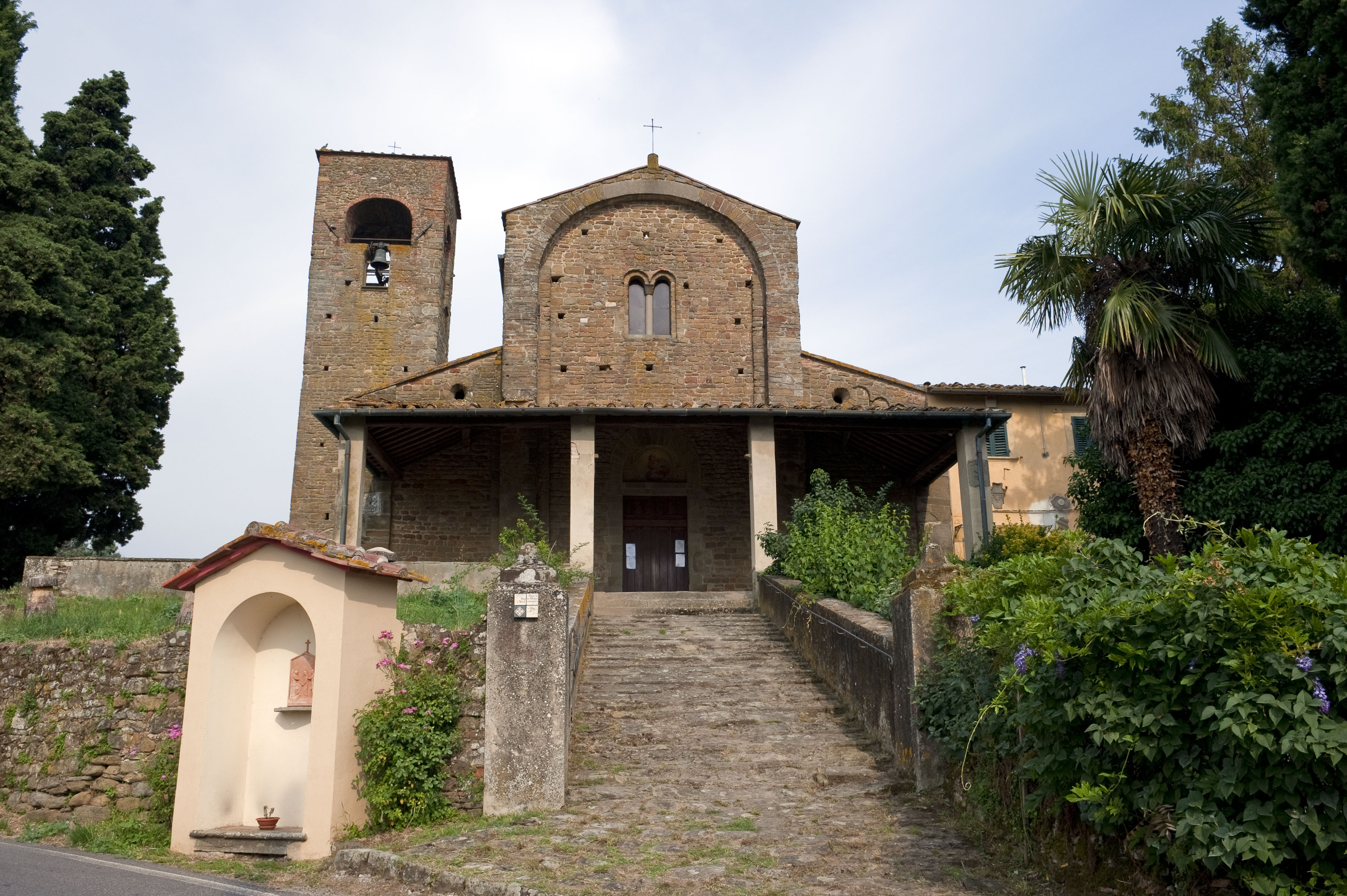

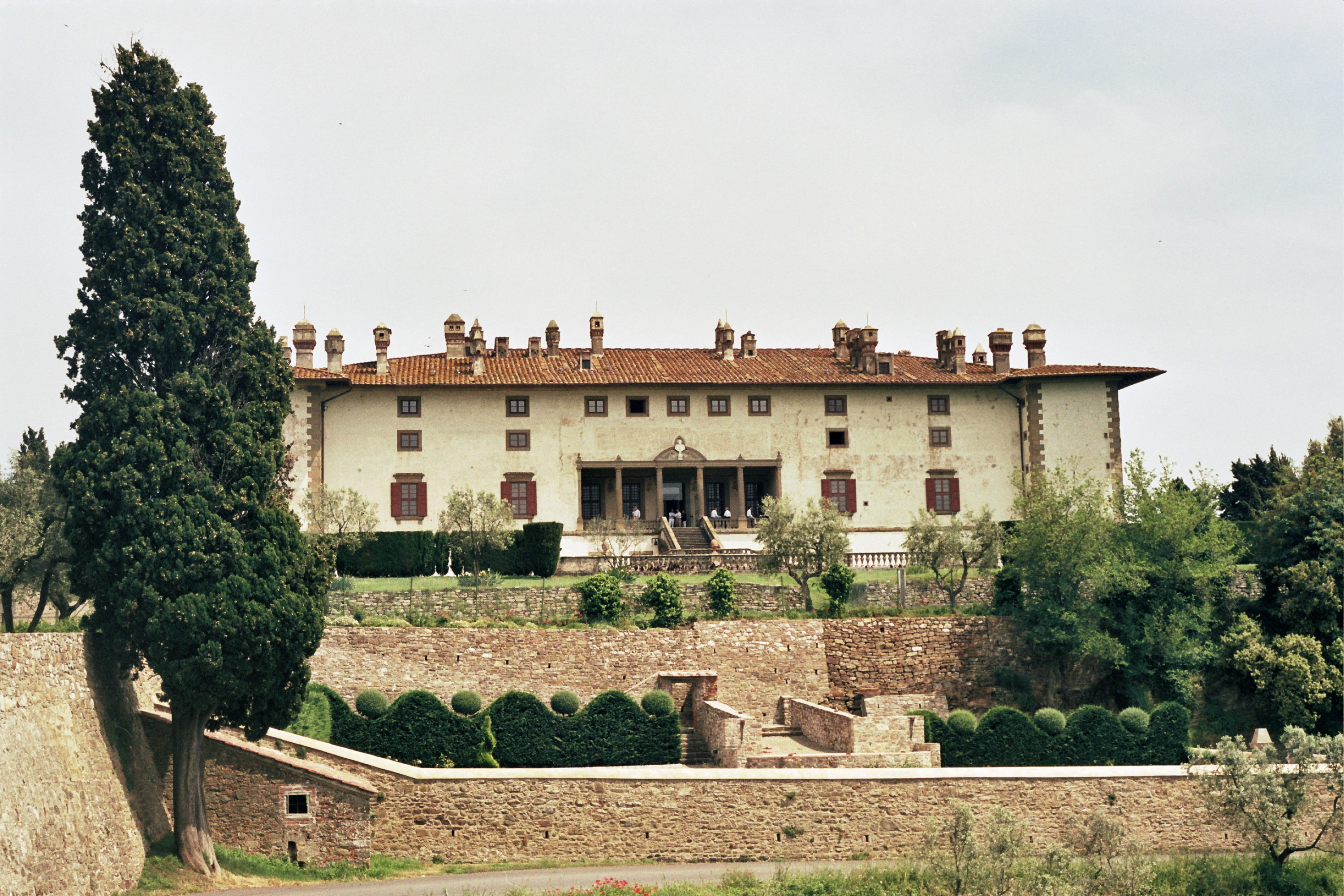
Villa La Ferdinanda, 1594–1596, Bernardo Buontalenti, Carmignano

San Leonardo is a romanesque-style, Roman Catholic rural parish church located on Via della Chiesa #19/a, just outside of the former castle overlooking in the neighborhood of Artimino of town of Carmignano, province of Prato, region of Tuscany, Italy.

== History ==
The pieve church is near the Villa Medicea La Ferdinanda. The church is cited in documents from 998 by Emperor Ottone III. The church was expanded in the 12th century, under the patronage of Countess Matilde di Canossa.

In the 14th century, gothic tracery was added to the interior. The bell-tower may derive from one of the watch-towers of the castle. In the 1960s, efforts were made to restore the church to its original romanesque decoration. The walls still contain Etruscan tomb spolia, with some now moved to the local archeologic museum. The belltower was modified in 16th and 17th centuries. The interior houses a wooden polychrome crucifix (1560) and a Madonna del Pozzo, copy of Franciabigio's work. It contains a 15th-century wooden statue of St Anthony Abbot, attributed to Agnolo di Polo and a statue of San Leonardo attributed to Domenico di Niccolò “dei Cori”. It has a terracotta in the Della Robbia style depicting the Visitation.
