= Abbey of San Giusto, Carmignano =

Church in Italy

Coordinates: 43°47′N 10°59′E

The Abbey of San Giusto (Abbazia di San Giusto) is a romanesque-style, Roman Catholic church and adjacent convent located in Via Montalbano in the neighborhood of Pinone of the town of Carmignano, province of Prato, region of Tuscany, Italy.

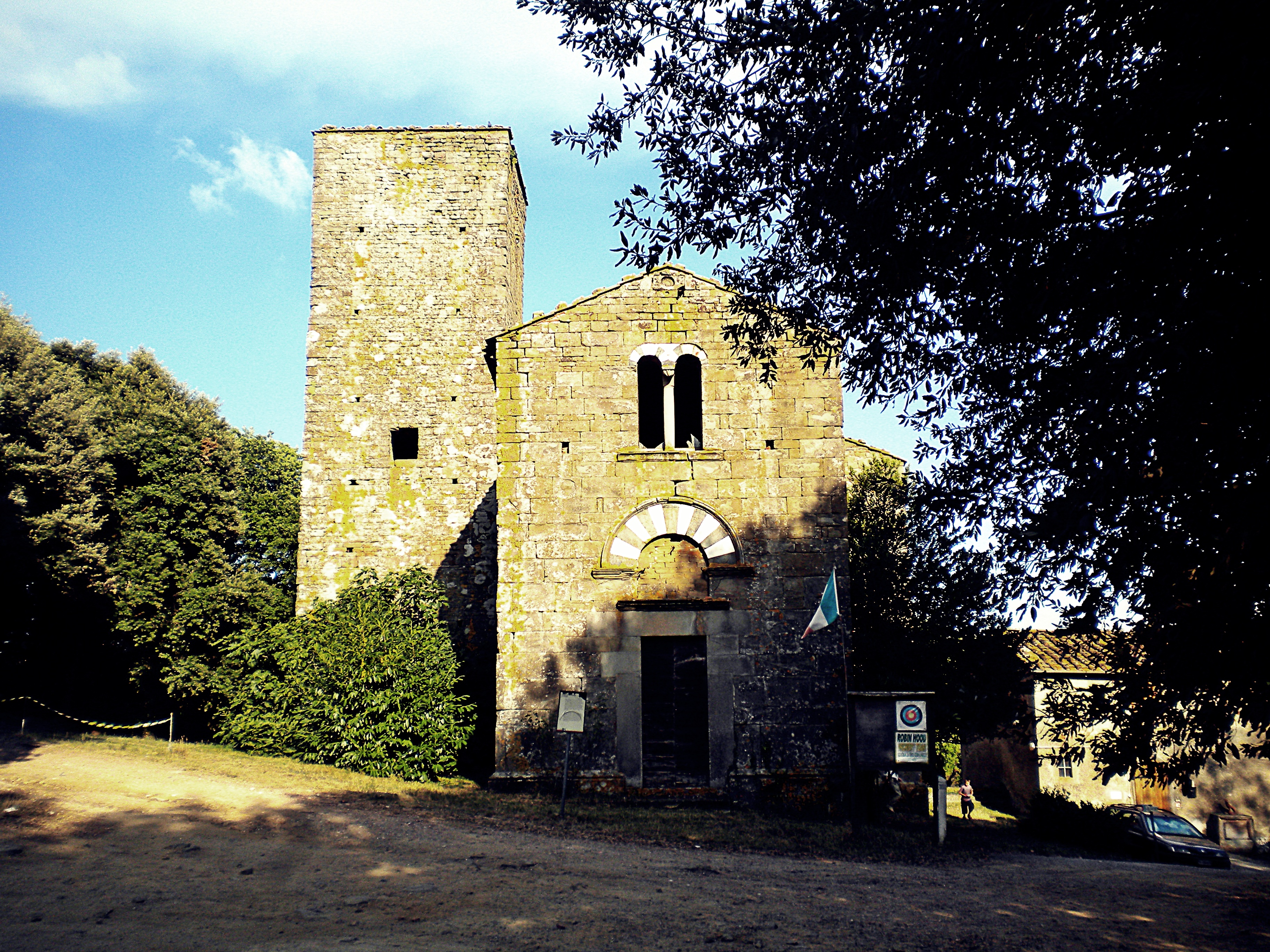
San Giusto parish church and abbey in Il Pinone

== History ==
The abbey is first documented by the 13th century, but likely founded by 12th century. By 1373, it had acquired the title of a priory. In 1535, documents cite a Sancto Iusto de Poggiolo, and by 1582, note that the property was dilapidated. For a time, the property belonged to the monastery of Montedomini in Florence.

In 1725, it was officiated for services by the parish of Verghereto, but by the 19th century, had again fallen to near ruin. During the post-world war II restorations, much of the structure has been protected. The church contains a 13th-century crypt under the apse, with typical heavy pilasters, accessed from the outside of the church. In the church, a few of the capitals have Romanesque decoration. A cultural association, Amici di San Giusto, raises funds for restoration.
