= San Giusto Abbey =

San Giusto Abbey may refer to:

- San Giusto Abbey, Tuscania, a monastery near Tuscania, Province of Viterbo, Lazio, Italy
- Abbey of San Giusto, Carmignano, a church in Carmignano, Province of Prato, Tuscany, Italy
- Abbey of San Giusto, Susa, a former Abbey in Susa, Piemont, Italy
