= San Michele, Comeana =

Parish church in Carmignano, Italy

San Michele is a renaissance-style, Roman Catholic rural parish church located on Piazza San Michele in the neighborhood of Comeana of town of Carmignano, province of Prato, region of Tuscany, Italy.

== History ==
A church at the site was present by the 13th century, but refurbished from the 16th to 18th centuries to its present eclectic appearance. The façade sports the coat of arms of the Mazzinghi family. The bell-tower was erected in 1812. The main altarpiece is a Madonna painted in the early 18th century.
