= Samuel James Ainsley =

British painter (1806–1874)

- Born: 22 February 1806; Cripplegate, London
- Died: 1874 (aged 67–68)
- Known for: Italian landscapes
- Movement: Romanticism

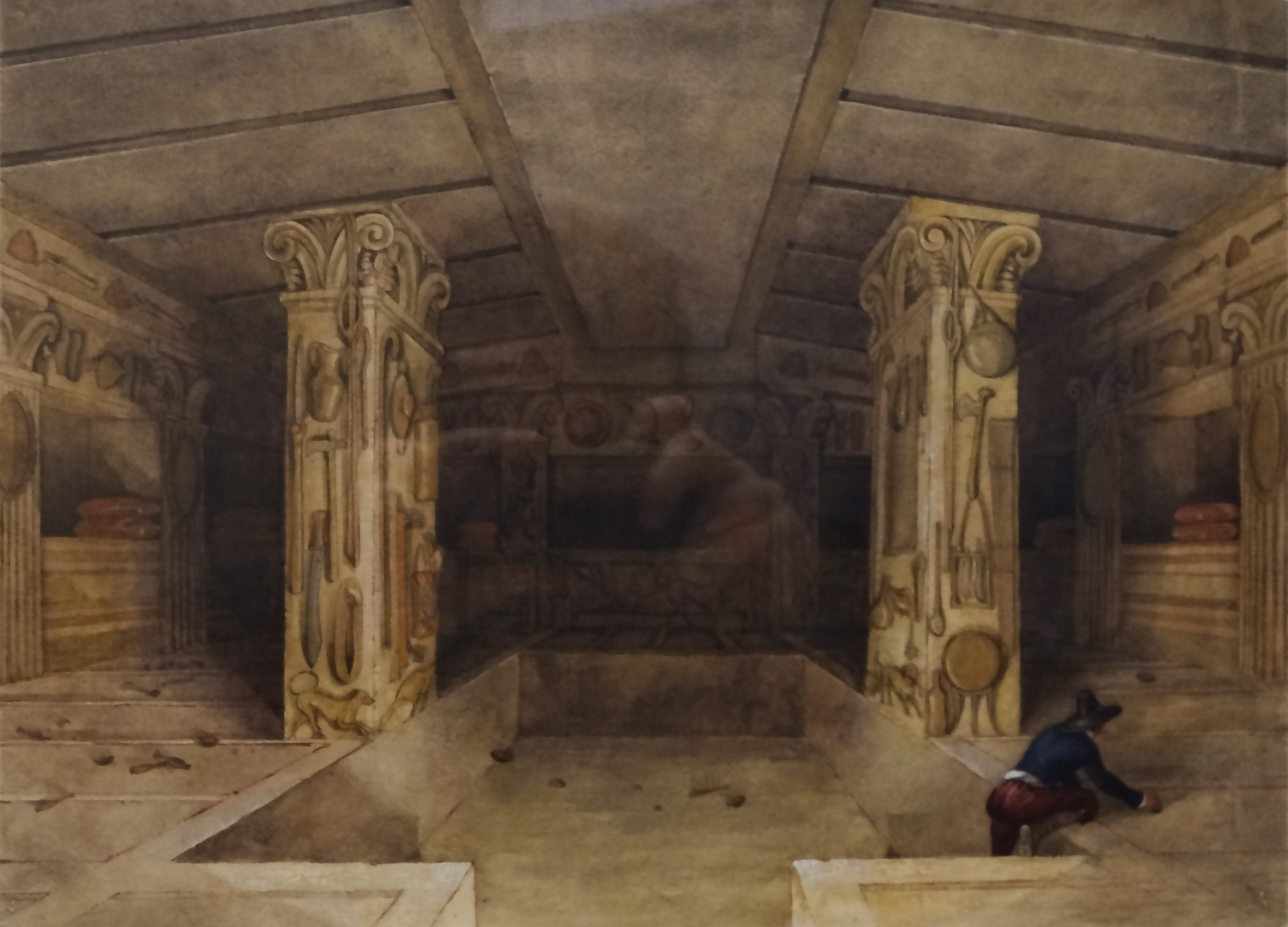
Tomb of the Reliefs by Ainsley.

Samuel James Ainsley (1806–1874) was a British sketch artist, watercolourist, and printmaker, known for his Romantic sketches and watercolours of tombs, monuments, and landscapes in Italy.

== Biography ==
He exhibited at the Royal Academy of Arts in 1836 and 1844.

From 1842 to 1844 Ainsley, on three separate trips, accompanied George Dennis in investigating tombs and monuments from ancient Etruria, the Etruscan civilization. From 1844 to 1847 Dennis, unaccompanied by Ainsley, continued to travel in Italy and investigate the ruins and cemeteries of Etruria. In 1848 the British Museum published a 1,085 page treatise Cities and cemeteries of Etruria, with text by Dennis (partly based upon notes by Ainsley) and sketches by Dennis and Ainsley.

In 1842 Ainsley accompanied the artist Thomas Cole on a six-week trip to Sicily, where they made many sketches. They visited the ruins at Selinus and Agrigento and made a nocturnal ascent of Mount Etna.

According to Massimo Pallottino, the fundamental note of Ainsley's works is often that of "depopulated solitude".

He bequeathed his drawings, prints and sketchbooks (comprising over 200 items) to the British Museum. Some of Ainsley's drawings and watercolours have been of lasting value to Italian field-workers studying the rock cemeteries of Middle Etruria.
