= San Michele e San Francesco, Carmignano =

Roman Catholic parish church in Carmignano, Italy

San Michele e San Francesco is a renaissance-style, Roman Catholic parish church located in the Piazza SS Francesco e Michele in the town of Carmignano, province of Prato, region of Tuscany, Italy. It is best known for housing the Jacopo Pontormo altarpiece of the Visitation.

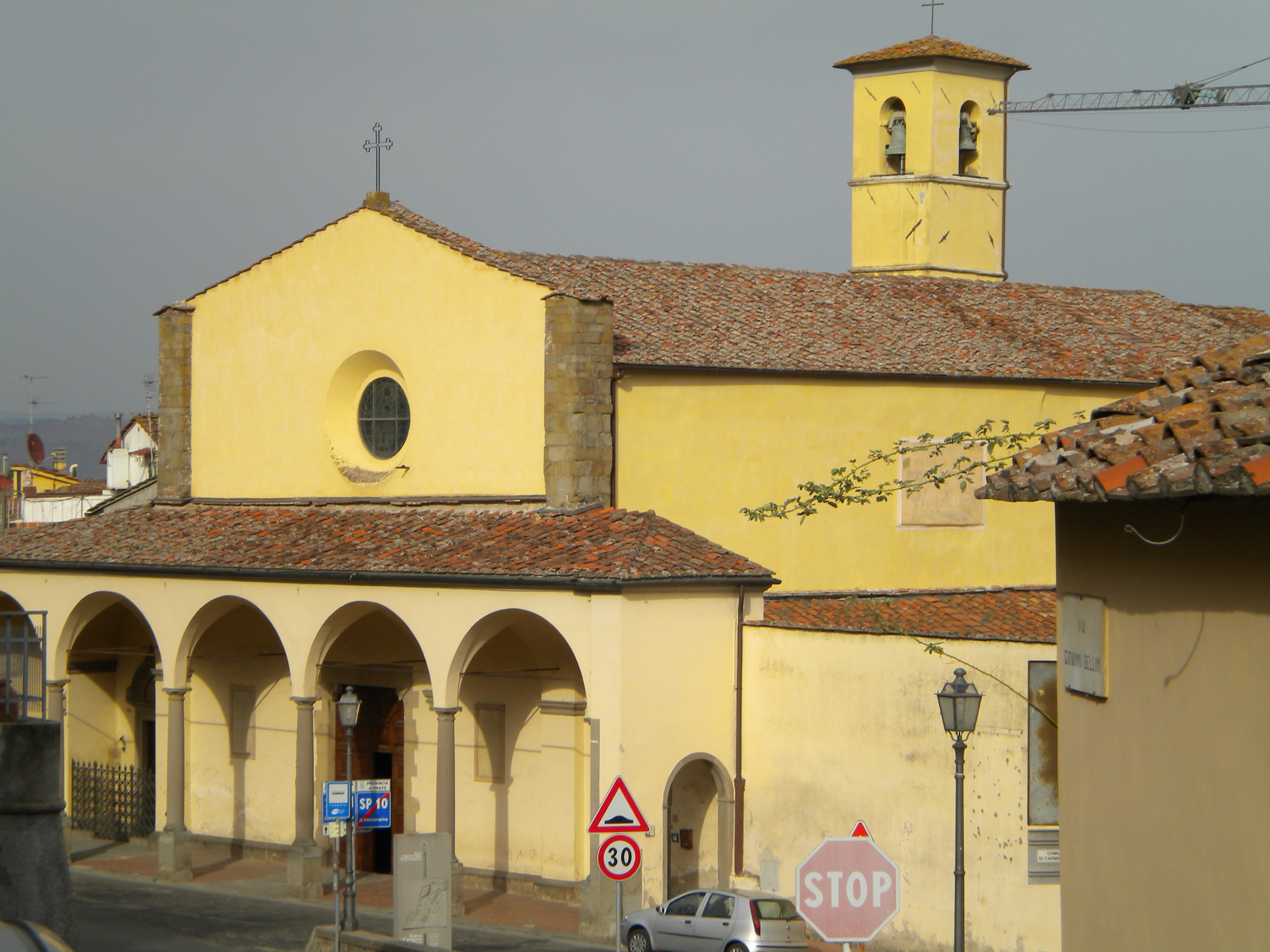
Facade with portico and bell-tower

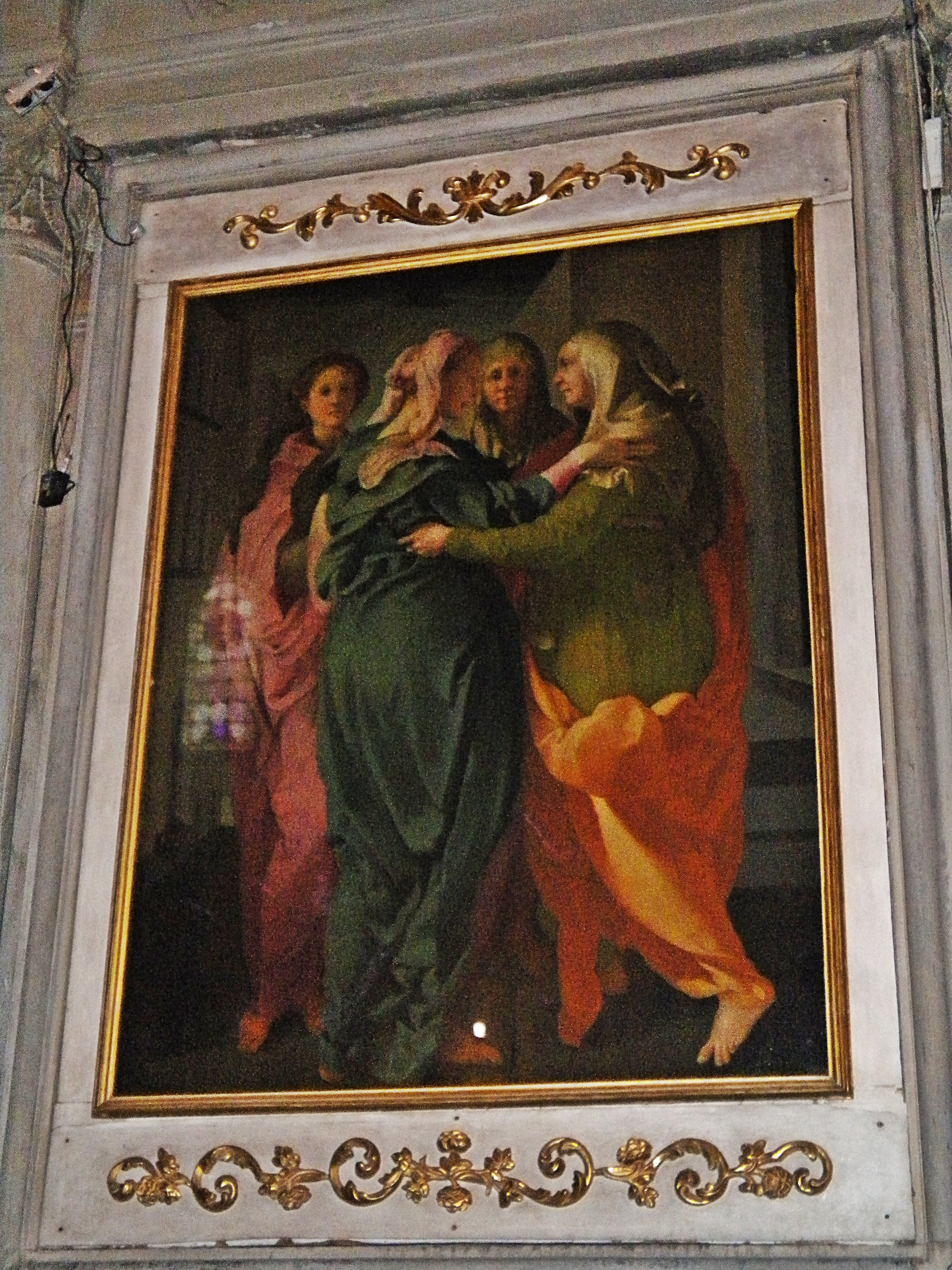
Visitation by Pontormo

== History ==
The pieve church was supposedly established after a visit to the town in 1211 by St Francis of Assisi. Under the patronage of Bernardo da Quintavalle a small convent and oratory were built. The present church, with a single nave typical of Franciscan churches, was built in 1330, with refurbishments over the centuries. The convent was suppressed in 1798. During World War II, the church was damaged, and reconstruction aimed at restoring its medieval layout. This joined the church to the Oratory of St Sebastian on the left and the cloister on the right. The portal has a memorial to Giovanni Parenti of Carmignano, general of the Franciscans.

The interiors has six lateral altars. The first on the right has a canvas depicting the Madonna del Carmine and Saints, attributed to Giovanni Battista Naldini. The second altar on the right houses the Visitation by Pontormo painted for I Pinadori. The third altar houses an altarpiece depicting St Francis receives the Stigmata (1635) also attributed to Naldini.

The church has an organ (1818) by Giosuè Agati. The presbytery houses a number of modern works and a large 16th-century chapel. The main altar has a processional wood statue of the Virgin. The main chapel has a large wooden crucifix (1731). The church windows were remade after the war. There are remnants of a fresco depicting the Martyrdom of St Catherine and Murder of St Peter Martyr (early 15th century) attributed to Antonio di Miniato di Piero and his brother (or father) Pietro. The baptistry has a fresco depicting the Baptism of Christ (19th century) by Luigi Catani.

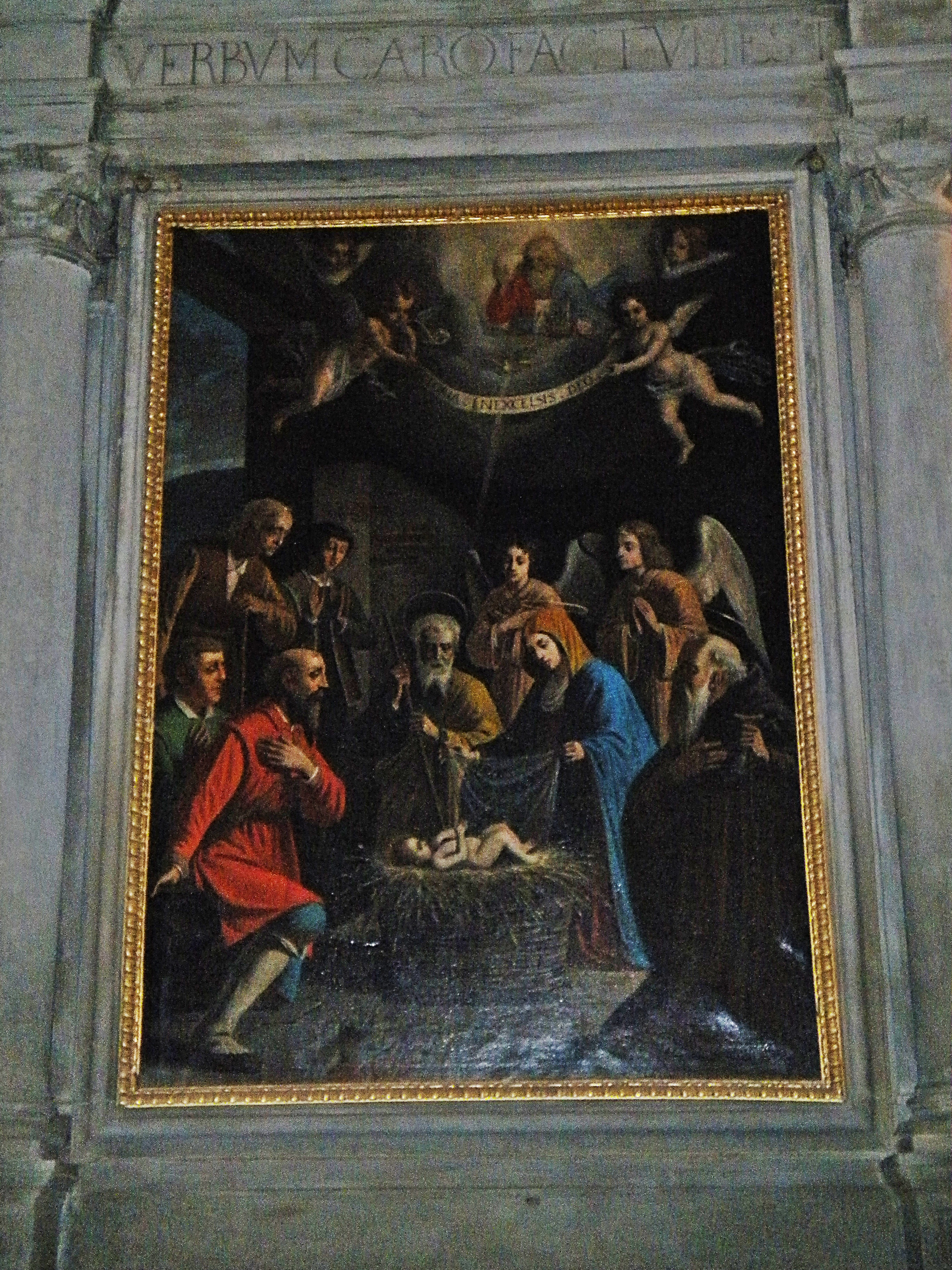
Adoration of the Shepherds by Naldini.

On left wall is a canvas depicting the Madonna and Child with Sts Dominic, Pius V, Catherine of Siena, and Catherine of Alexandria celebrate the mystery of the Rosary (1601) by Cosimo Lotti. It is followed by an altar depicting St John the Evangelist, Francis, Macario and Andrew from the 17th century, with an Annunciation of the school of Lorenzo Monaco. The last altar on the left from 1642 has an Adoration of the Shepherds and St Anthony Abbot by Naldini.

The adjacent choir with a well from 1622 has a number of wall burials dating from 15th to 18th centuries.

The Oratory of the Compagnia del SS. Sacramento and San Luca probably reflect the original chapel at the site, and was the home in 1348 of a company of Disciplinati (flagellants). The Oratory was refurbished in 1776–1778 and redecorated in the 19th century. The oratory has a canvas depicting the Purification of Mary by Pier Antonio Michi. There is also a canvas depicting the Madonna in Glory with Saints Jerome and John the Evangelist attributed to either Sagrestani or Gabbiani.
