= San Pietro, Seano =

Parish church in Seano, Italy

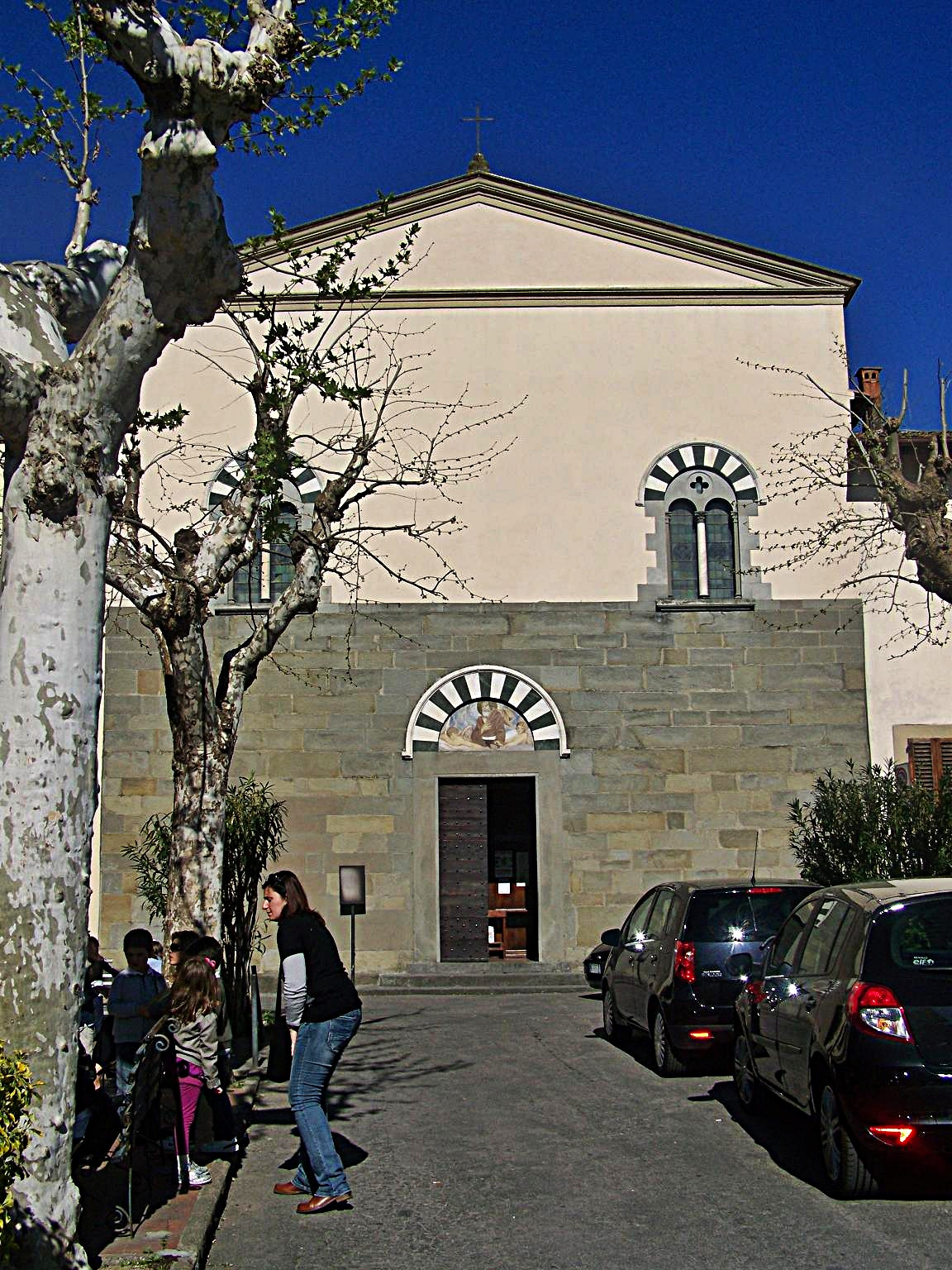

San Pietro is a Roman Catholic pieve or rural parish church located on Piazza of the same name in the neighborhood of Seano, near the town of Carmignano, province of Prato, region of Tuscany, Italy.

== History ==
The church is documented in 998 by Emperor Ottone III, other documents cite a church in this region during 1179 and 1218 as a parish dependent of the pieve of Carmignano. In 1447–1518, it became property of the abbey of Monteoliveto in Pistoia. The church became independent of the abbey, when the latter was suppressed in 1782.

The church has a Neo-Romanesque façade and portal dating to 1928. The bell-tower dates to the 19th century. The interior was decorated around 1836 with statues of the apostles by Bartolomeo Valiani. The altar has a 15th-century crucifix, attributed to the style of Francesco di Valdambrino. The church also has a number of works by Giuseppe Santelli. The adjacent Oratory of the Company of the Body of Christ has a main altarpiece depicting the Assumption of Mary with Sts Peter Macario and Roch by Domenico Frilli Croci, a 16th-century painter.
