= Castle of the Counts of San Maroto =

The Castle of the Counts of San Maroto (Italian: Castello dei Conti di San Maroto) is a medieval castle located in the hamlet of San Maroto, at the gates of the municipality of Pievebovigliana, in the province of Macerata, in the Marche region, Italy.

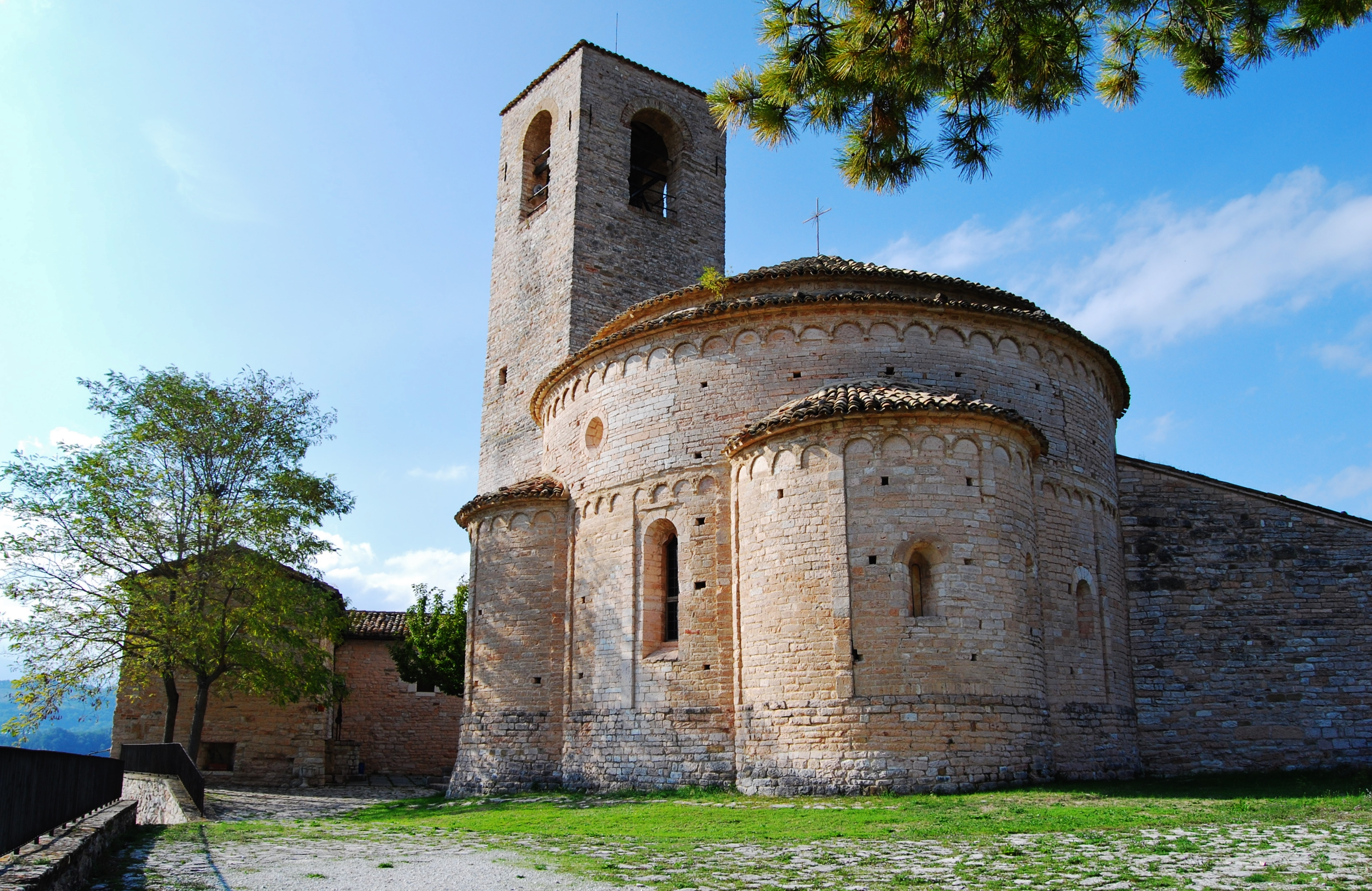
Valfornace - Church of San Giusto

== History ==
The castle of San Maroto was built between the 11th and 12th centuries on the summit of what is now Colle Castello, about 700 meters from the Church of San Giusto. Expert craftsmen are thought to have arrived from the East, particularly Syria, for its construction.

In 1240, the castle was listed in Pope Innocent IV's diploma and was recorded as owned by the Counts of San Maroto, supporters of the Guelph party, who sided with the Da Varano family in 1259 during the Swabian invasion. They were among the co-founders of the municipality of Camerino, obtaining citizenship early on. Their nobility was confirmed in a document from 1284 preserved in the Municipal Archives of Acquacanina.

The fiefdom of the Counts of San Maroto was eventually absorbed into the Municipality of Camerino. However, by the 14th century, the family remained politically influential and economically wealthy. Giacomuccio Conte di San Maroto acquired properties in Bolognola and Podalla, as well as the entire village of Acquacanina, including its tower, palace, and the surrounding area. Descendants of the family continue to bear the nobiliary distinction dei Conti San Maroto.

By the late 14th century, likely after the castle had lost its strategic importance, a defense and watchtower was built on the west side of the Church of San Giusto. In 1502, the castle was briefly absorbed into the Duchy of Romagna following Cesare Borgia's conquest of Camerino.
