= San Giusto, Pievebovigliana =

Church in Valfornace, Italy

Coordinates: 43°05′39″N 13°08′20″E

San Giusto is a Romanesque-style, Roman Catholic church located in the frazione of San Maroto outside the town of Pievebovigliana, province of Macerata, region of Marche, Italy.

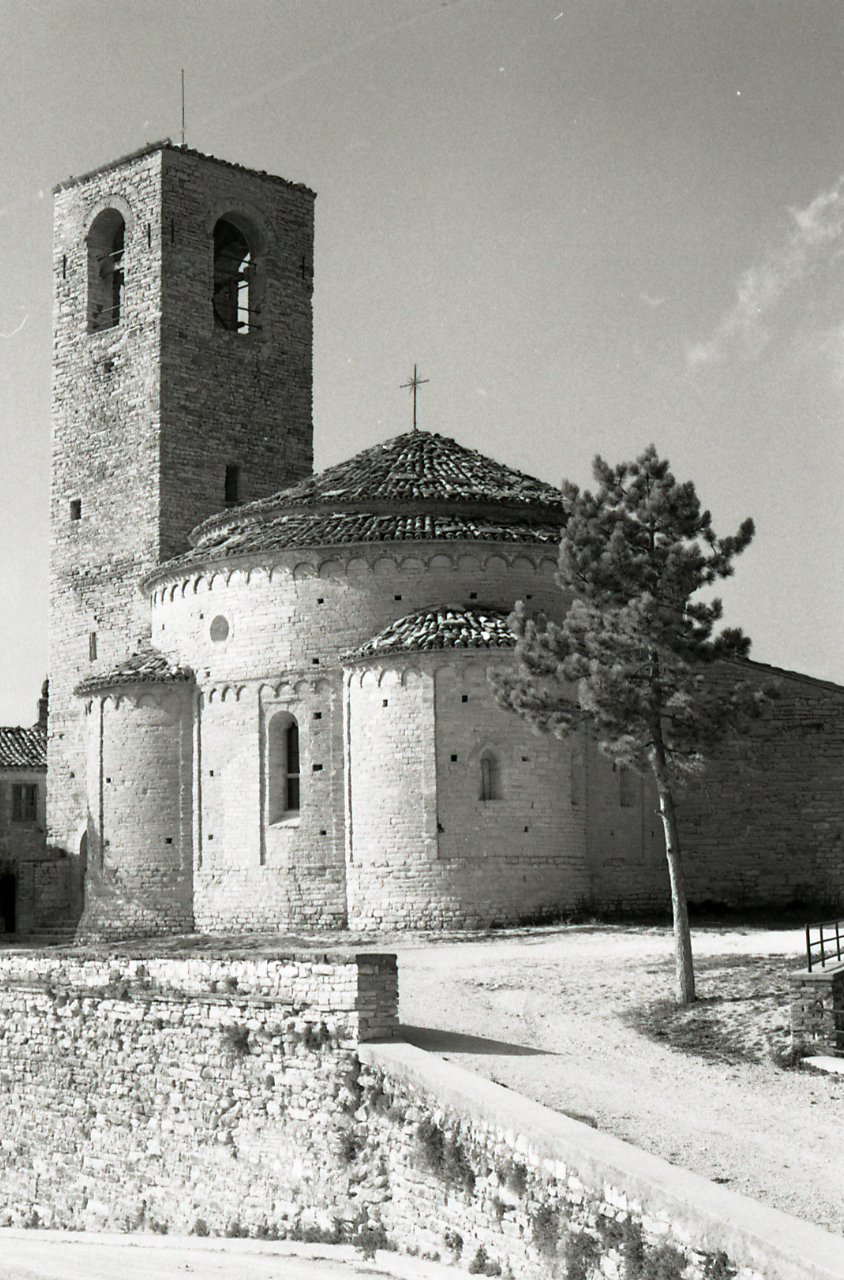
Apse and chapels of San Giusto

== History ==
The stone church was built between the 11th and 13th centuries. It has a circular layout with a low tiled dome showing the influence of Byzantine style. Semicircular chapels help buttress the dome. The bell tower retains 14th century-frescoes, while the church has an altarpiece depicting the Madonna del Rosario by Venanzio da Camerino. Another altarpiece depicting an Enthroned Madonna and Child dates to the mid 13th-century. The mid-16th century crucifix is attributed to Tobia da Camerino.
