= Tumulus of Montefortini =

Etruscan tomb in Italy

Coordinates: 43°47′34.23″N 11°03′53.80″E

- Tumulo di Montefortini
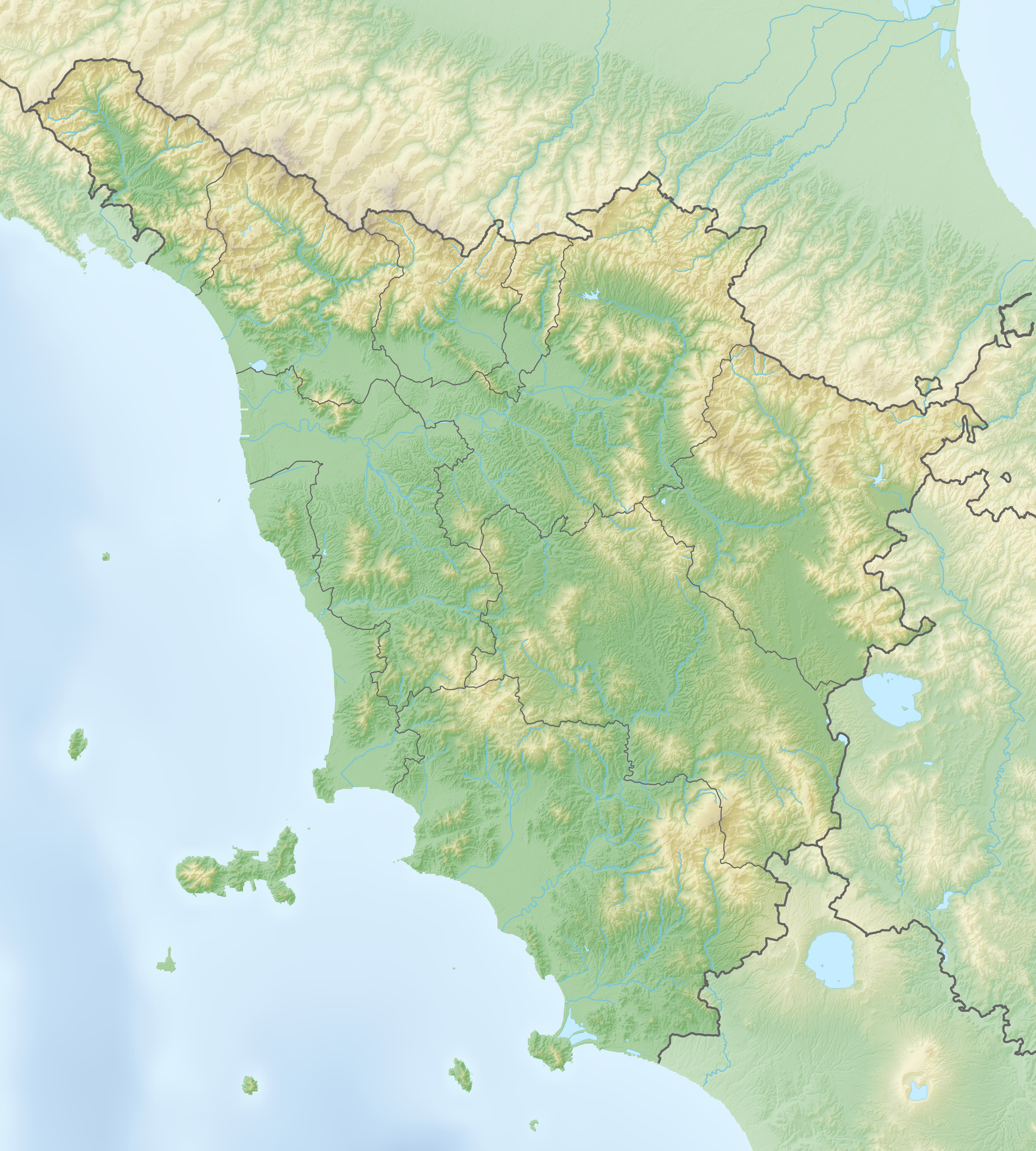
- Location within Tuscany
- Type: Tumulus (burial mound)
- Cultures: Etruscan
- Location: Comeana, Tuscany, Italy
- Region: Etruria

History
- Built: 7th century BC
- Abandoned: ca. 200 BC

Site notes
- Height: 11–12 m
- Length: 70–80 m
- Excavation dates: 1966, 1982
- Condition: Partially preserved
- Management: Archaeological Museum of Artimino
- Public access: Yes

The Tumulus of Montefortini is an Etruscan tomb near Comeana, Tuscany, central Italy, which is believed to date from the 7th century BC.

The tumulus is an oval burial mound 80 metres long and 11 metres high, which houses two tombs. Excavations began in 1966 and the finds are displayed in the museum of Artimino.

== Description ==
The tumulus is an artificial oval burial mound, about 70–80 metres in diameter and 11–12 metres high, surrounded by a sandstone drum. On the north-western side, a platform interrupts the enclosure, which is thought to have supported a sacrificial altar. The monumentality of the site is accentuated by the surrounding oak and holm oak forest. The mound houses two tombs.

== Montefortini Tomb I ==
The first tomb consists of a chamber tomb excavated and restored beginning in 1966. Access is provided by a wide dromos, 13 metres long, leading to a quadrangular vestibule, 2.10 metres long and 2.50 metres wide, which was probably originally covered with a false corbelled vault of projecting stone slabs. Through a trilitic portal, consisting of two movable door leaves surmounted by an architrave, one leaves the vestibule and enters the burial chamber. The perfectly rectangular chamber, 4.50 metres long and 2.55 metres wide, represents one of the finest examples of Etruscan architecture from the Orientalizing period. Along the walls runs a shelf intended for the placement of cinerary urns of the deceased. The tomb was likely plundered as early as 200 BC, when the vault of the vestibule is thought to have collapsed, and on subsequent occasions. Despite this, it yielded a sufficient number of finds to allow it to be dated between the last quarter of the 7th century and the first quarter of the 6th century BC (625–575 BC). Among the finds were carved and finely engraved works, coarse ceramic cinerary urns, bucchero cups, and remains of Egyptian glass-paste vessels now preserved in the Archaeological Museum of Artimino.

== Montefortini Tomb II ==
The second burial chamber, located at the centre of the tumulus and whose presence had long been hypothesized, was excavated only from 1982 onwards. It is a large tholos tomb, the structure of which partially collapsed, perhaps as a result of an earthquake, and was already tampered with in antiquity. The entire structure has a diameter of about seven metres, is built of sandstone, and features a central pillar. Among the discoveries were an iron fibula, fragments of ivory, decorated ostrich egg shells, Egyptian blue glass, amber, and fragments of bucchero.
