= Cathedral of San Giusto =

Cathedral of San Giusto can refer to one of the following religious buildings in Italy:

- Susa Cathedral, dedicated to Saint Justus of Novalesa
- Trieste Cathedral, dedicated to Saint Justus of Trieste
