= George Dennis (explorer) =

British explorer of Etruria

George Dennis CMG (21 July 1814 in Ash Grove, Hackney, Middlesex – 15 November 1898 in South Kensington, London) was a British explorer of Etruria; his written account and drawings of the ancient places and monuments of the Etruscan civilization combined with his summary of the ancient sources is among the first of the modern era and remains an indispensable reference in Etruscan studies.

== Early life ==
George Dennis left school at the age of 15. He never went to college, yet he took an interest in languages, studying ancient Greek and Latin on his own and eventually becoming a polyglot in French, Spanish, Portuguese, Italian, modern Greek, Turkish, and some Arabic. A strongly physical man as well, he often went for 40-mile hikes in the uplands of Scotland and Wales. He resolved to become an explorer; however, he worked mainly alone.

== Solitary Explorer ==
At age 22, Dennis conducted his first explorations in Portugal and Spain, writing his first work, A Summer in Andalucia, in 1839. Dennis roughed it in Etruria between 1842, at age 28, and 1847, in the company of artist Samuel Ainsley in three separate trips from 1842 to 1844. Etruria of the times had reverted to a semi-wilderness state, rural, depopulated, malarial, and infested with bandits. There were few roads. Dennis hiked across the country, living in the outdoors or in rural quarters infested with insects, studying and recording the monuments he found and any traditions associated with them.

The result of his travels was his 1,085-page treatise Cities and cemeteries of Etruria, published in 1848 by the British Museum and including sketches by Dennis and Ainsley. Dennis captures Etruscan civilization and Tuscan landscapes in able prose with scholarly detail. It was nevertheless generally unknown and unappreciated by the British public, partly because of Dennis's lack of academic credentials. He did make some fast friends among the academics who read his work, such as Austen Henry Layard.

== Colonial officer ==
As his book did not receive the recognition and remuneration it deserved, George used his contacts to obtain work with the Colonial Service, which shipped him off to British Guiana. He married there, but he found life dreary. After 14 years, he asked his friend Austen Henry Layard to mediate with Lord John Russell to get him out of Guiana. The ploy was successful and in 1863, at age 50, Dennis went as vice-consul to Sicily, subsequently to Benghazi and Smyrna in Turkey, accompanied by his wife. He had no children.

== Recognition ==
Meanwhile, his magnum opus became widely read and was appreciated for the masterpiece it is. Oxford University awarded him an honorary Doctorate of Civil Law for it. He was made a Companion of the Order of St. Michael and St. George. His lack of a formal education was a stigma that prevented higher honours. He endured shallow reviews and comments for the rest of his life.

== End ==
George Dennis died alone in London at age 84, officially of "senile decay". At some time before his death, the second and third editions of his work had come out.

== Bibliography ==
- Dennis, George (1839). A Summer in Andalucia. London: R. Bentley. Two volumes. A rare book.
- Dennis, George (1883). The Cities and Cemeteries of Etruria, Third Edition. London: John Murray. Two volumes. Downloadable from Google Books at .
- Potter, Timothy W. "Dennis of Etruria: a celebration", Antiquity 72 (1998), 916–21. doi:10.1017/S0003598X00087585
- Rhodes, Dennis E. Article in Oxford Dictionary of National Biography.
- Rhodes, Dennis E. (1973). Dennis of Etruria. London: Cecil & Amelia Rhodes.
- Wellar, James (1973). The Search for the Etruscans. New York: Saturday Review Press. ISBN 0-8415-0231-5.
