= Pia Casa di Lavoro, Florence =

Coordinates: 43.7677°N 11.2673°E

The Pia Casa di Lavoro di Montedomini is a large complex of buildings in Florence, Italy; the complex took shape in 1812, on the site of two expropriated former monasteries, where the Napoleonic government built a poor-house. The complex is bound by Via dei Malcontenti, Via delle Casine, Via Pietro Thouar and the Viale della Giovine Italia. The complex is located in the quartiere of Santa Croce, east of the city, north of the Arno river, and just within the 16th-century city walls.

== History ==
Originally Montedomini referred to a suburb in the east of the city, next to the shores of the Mugnone stream, where the Clarissan nuns had a monastery. It was from this convent that Dante's Piccarda Donati was retrieved for marriage. Destroyed in the Siege of Florence (1529–30), the nuns were relocated by Duke Alessandro de' Medici to this site, inside the walls, where there previously had been a Lazzaretto or leper asylum (1478), called the Spedale degli Ammorbati (Hospital of the Sick). Another monastery entitled Monticelli was sited adjacent to this Montedomini.

In 1810 both monasteries were closed. In 1812, putatively to celebrate the birth of Napoleon's son, the King of Rome, The architect Giuseppe Del Rosso was commissioned to fuse the monasteries into a single complex, renamed initially the Deposito di Mendicità, later after restoration, Pia Casa di Lavoro. The poor house was housing, training, and employing over a thousand young men and women.

By 1817 the population included 1054 males and 954 females. By 1840, the census had fallen to less than a thousand, only to increase when in 1840, laws against begging were enforced. By 1849, the population rose to about 1300.

In 1868 the rules of the Pia Casa di Lavoro were revised and it became the largest charitable institution in Florence, offering shelter to over 1000 persons of all ages and both sexes. The boys were taught a trade, while girls learned to embroider and sew, or learn how to become house-maids. The shelter maintained a monastic-like cloistering, preventing outsiders from visiting without a special permission from the Director. Among the trades taught to boys in 1848 were mechanic, carriage worker, varnisher/painter (verniciatore), blacksmith, cobbler, typographer, and engraver/wood carver.

In 1848, a eulogy of the former director, Pietro Thouar, described the director of the institution as having a goal of to guide towards great works, the multitude of young girls and children strapped to the crossroads, the old beggars, the vagrants subtracted from idleness, crime, and misery. The director was described as heeding in his time the word of an apostle, that steeled him to loving hand that guided him and raised him out of degradation.

Much of the architecture on Via dei Malcontenti dates to the second half of the 19th century under the engineer Ghelardo and Pietro Gaetano Gherardi. Other facades had been completed earlier by Giuseppe Del Rosso. Further expansion occurred along the Viale della Giovine Italia under Vincenzo Ricci. In the late 19th century, homes for the convalescence of wounded soldiers were erected. On via delle Cascine, the original structures of the convent of Monticelli, can be seen.
