= Carmignano =

- Comune
- Comune di Carmignano
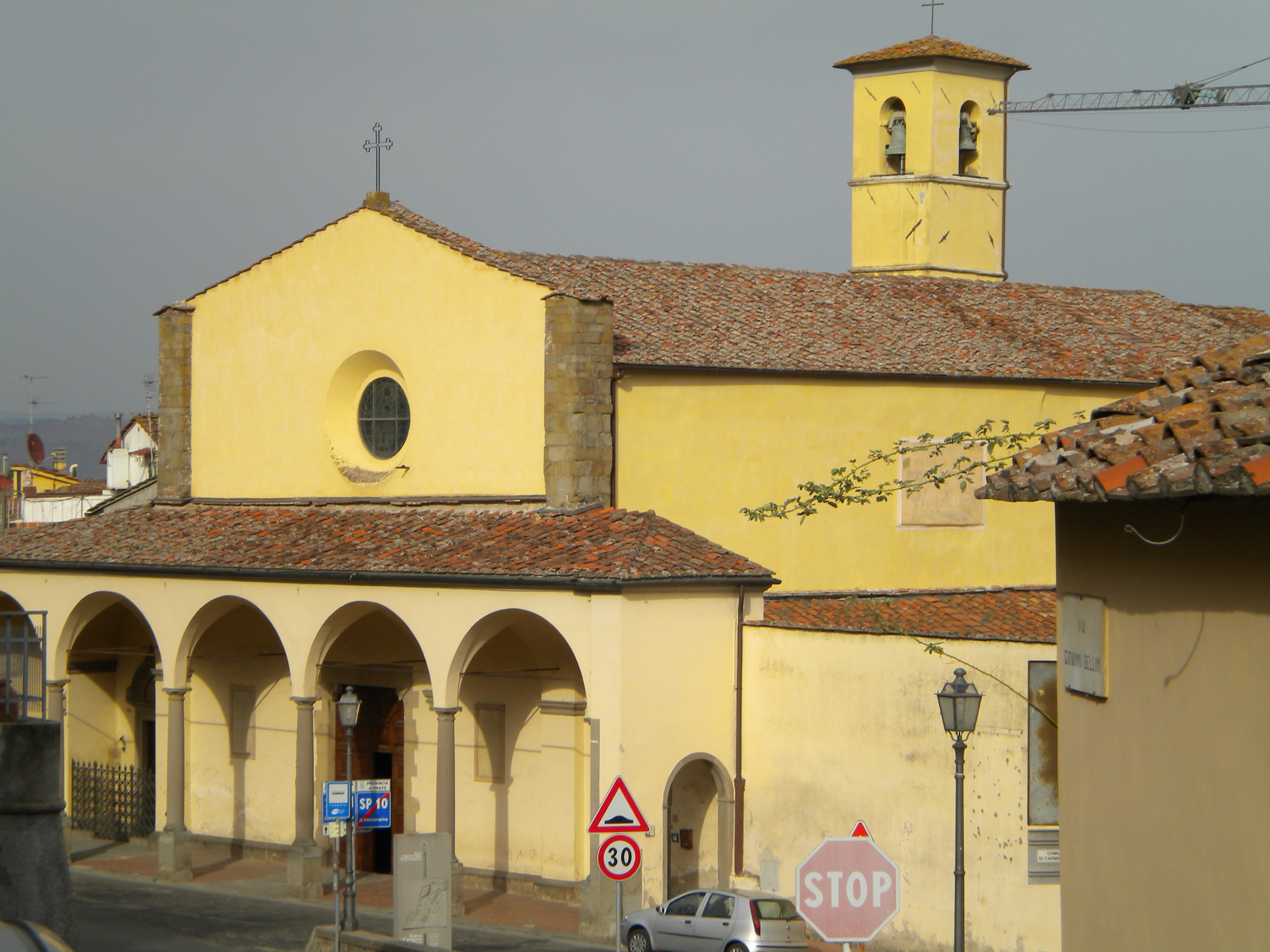
- Santi Michele e Francesco church

- Coat of arms

- Location within Italy Location within Tuscany
- Coordinates: 43°49′N 11°1′E
- Country: Italy
- Region: Tuscany
- Province: Prato (PO)
- Frazioni: Artimino, Bacchereto, Barchetto della Pineta, Capezzana, Castelvecchio, Colle Novelli, Comeana, Grumaggio, I Renacci, Il Pinone, Il Poggiolo, La Serra, Lazzera, Le Barche, Le Ginestre, Malinoci, Montalbiolo, Pianetto, Poggio alla Malva, San Martino, Santa Cristina a Mezzana, Seano, Spazzavento, Stazione, Verghereto, Verrucola

Government
  - Mayor: Edoardo Prestanti

Area
  - Total: 38.43 km^{2} (14.84 sq mi)
- Elevation: 189 m (620 ft)

Population (2025)
  - Total: 14,577
  - Density: 379.3/km^{2} (982.4/sq mi)
- Demonym: Carmignanesi
- Time zone: UTC+1 (CET)
  - Summer (DST): UTC+2 (CEST)
- Postal code: 59015
- Dialing code: 055
- Patron saint: St. Michael Archangel
- Saint day: 29 September
- Website: Official website

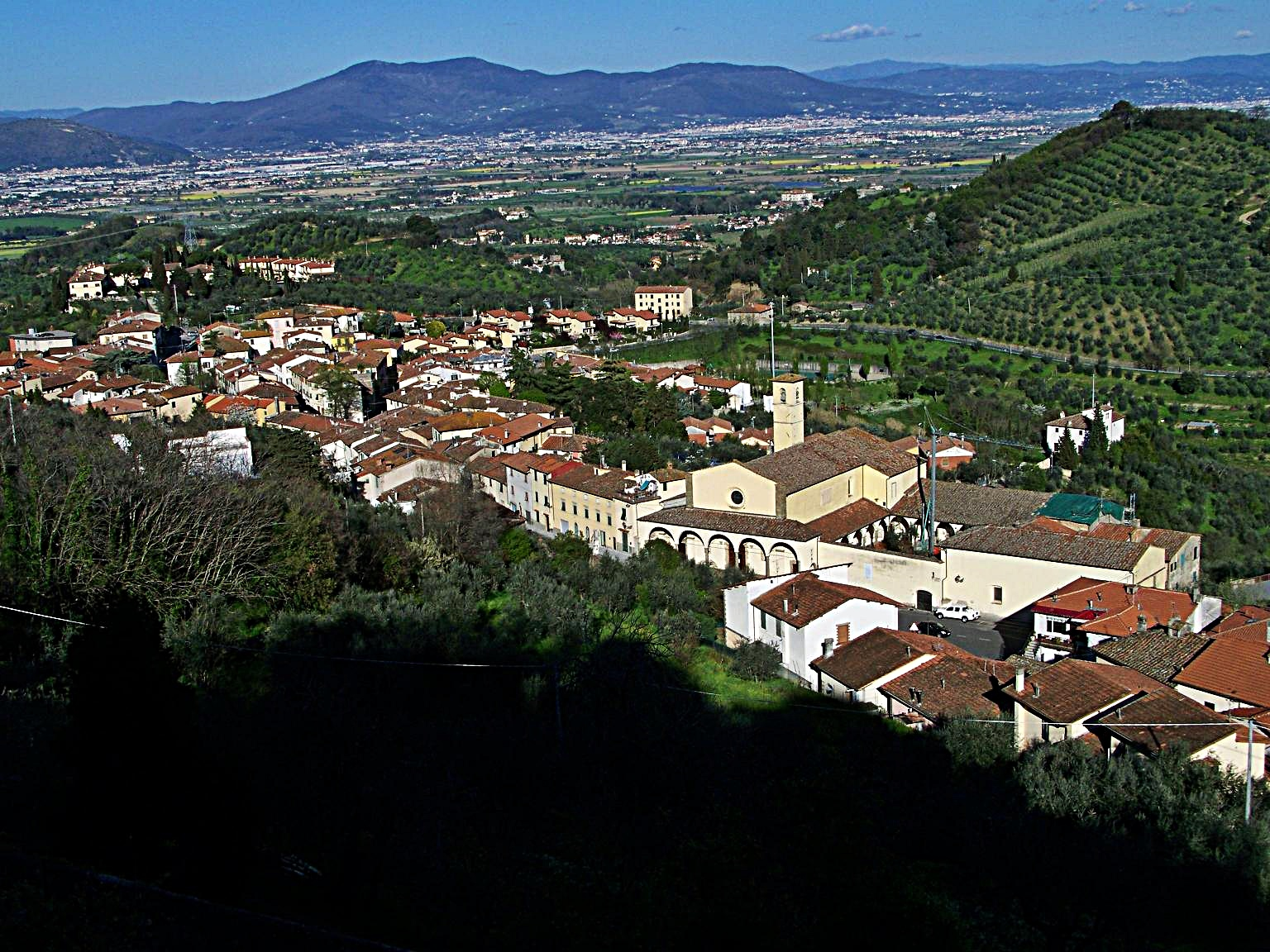
View of Carmignano

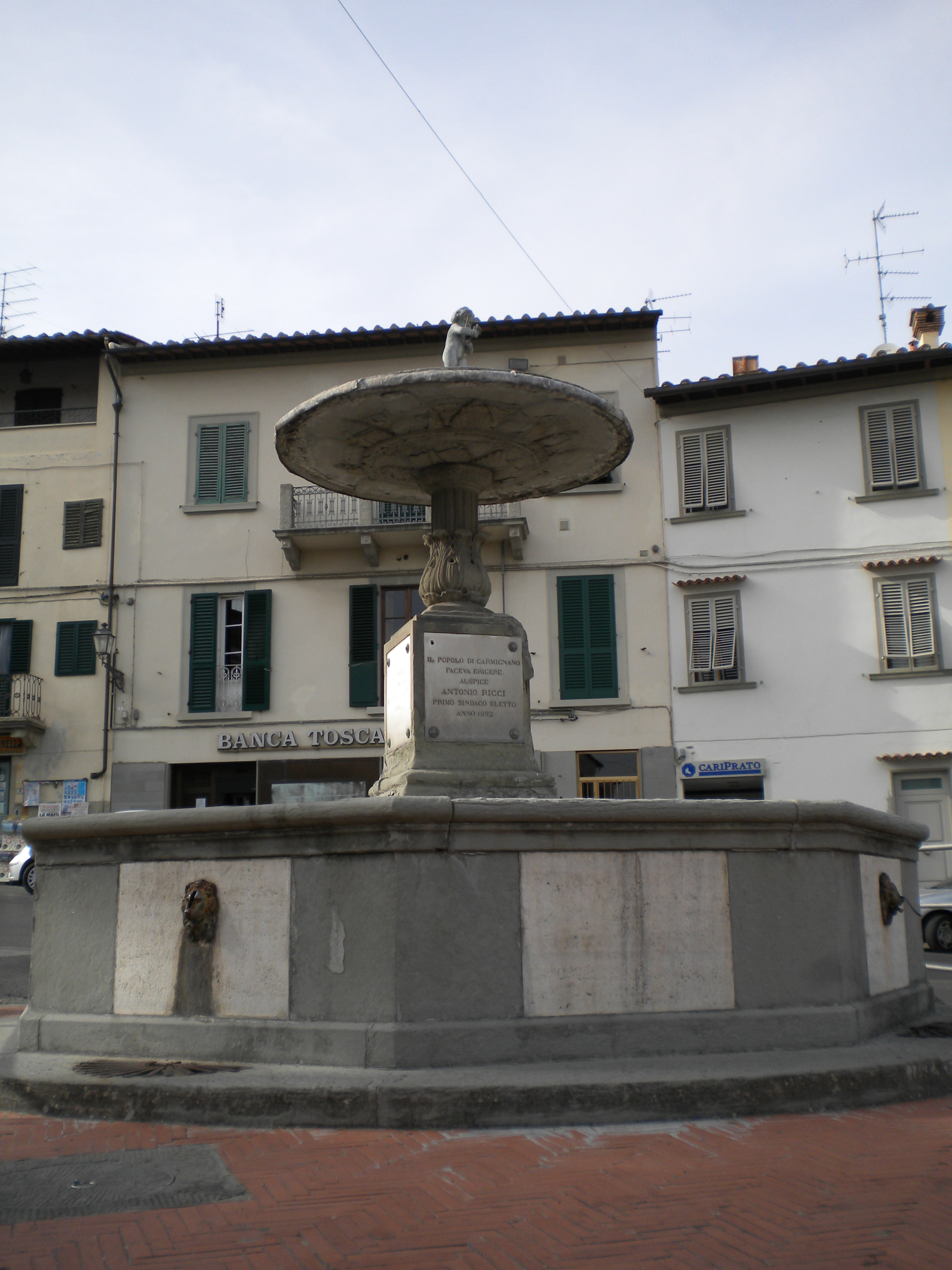
Child fountain

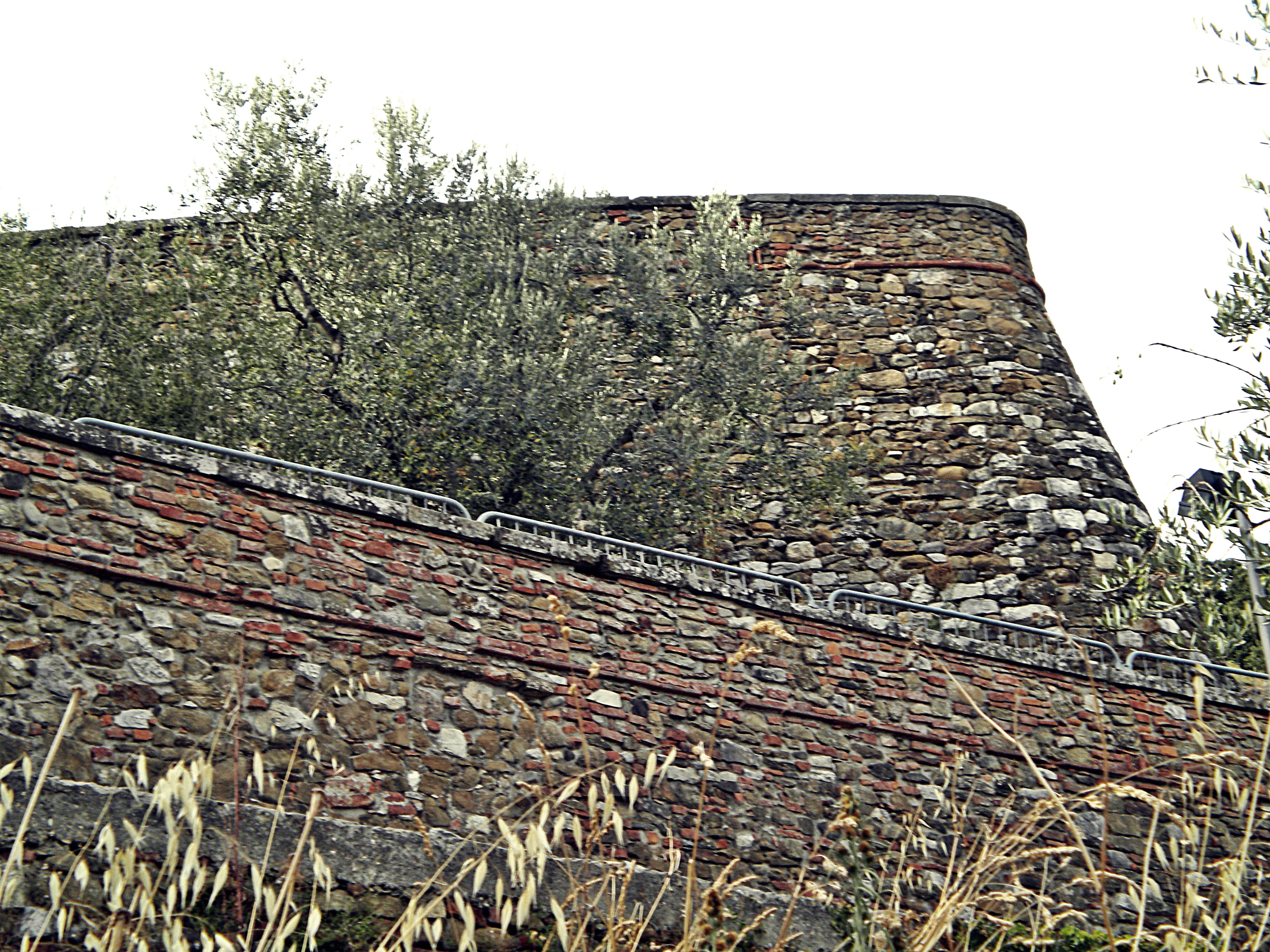
The fortress (Rocca)

Carmignano is a comune (municipality) in the province of Prato, part of the Italian region Tuscany. It is located about 20 kilometres (12 mi) west of Florence and about 10 kilometres (6 mi) southwest of Prato. It is the centre of the wine region of the same name. It has 14,577 inhabitants.

== Geography ==
Carmignano borders the following municipalities: Capraia e Limite, Lastra a Signa, Montelupo Fiorentino, Poggio a Caiano, Prato, Quarrata, Signa, Vinci.

== Demographics ==
Historical population

| Year | Pop. | ±% |
|---|---|---|
| 1861 | 7,315 | — |
| 1871 | 8,144 | +11.3% |
| 1881 | 8,567 | +5.2% |
| 1901 | 9,587 | +11.9% |
| 1911 | 9,964 | +3.9% |
| 1921 | 9,926 | −0.4% |
| 1931 | 9,616 | −3.1% |
| 1936 | 9,469 | −1.5% |

| Year | Pop. | ±% |
|---|---|---|
| 1951 | 8,723 | −7.9% |
| 1961 | 8,401 | −3.7% |
| 1971 | 7,668 | −8.7% |
| 1981 | 7,946 | +3.6% |
| 1991 | 9,584 | +20.6% |
| 2001 | 11,857 | +23.7% |
| 2011 | 13,991 | +18.0% |
| 2021 | 14,753 | +5.4% |

Source: ISTAT

== Main sights ==
The most important attraction of the town is the church of San Michele e San Francesco (12th century), which houses a Visitation by the Renaissance master Pontormo.

The 10th century Rocca ("Castle"), in the upper part of the town, is well preserved. The frazione of Comeana is home to several Etruscan tombs (such as the Tumulus of Montefortini), while at Artimino is a Medicean villa.

=== Churches ===
- Abbey of San Martino
- Chapel at Villa Le Falene
- Chapel at Villa le Farnete
- Little church in Castelvecchio
- Little church of Toia in Bacchereto
- Chapel at the Institute of the Sisters Stigmata
- San Leonardo parish church in Artimino
- Oratory of the Virgin and Holy Cross in Verrucola
- Oratorio of San Francesco in Le Ginestre
- Oratory of San Jacopo in Capezzana
- Oratory of Sant'Antonio at Villa Novelli
- Santi Michele e Francesco in Carmignano
- San Giusto in Il Pinone
- San Lorenzo in Montalbiolo
- San Michele in Comeana
- San Pietro in Seano
- San Pietro in Verghereto
- Santa Cristina in Santa Cristina in Mezzana
- Santa Maria in Artimino
- Santa Maria Assunta in Bacchereto

=== Villas ===
- Villa in barchetto della Pineta
- Medici Villa in Artimino
- Villa Amata in Verrucola
- Villa Batisti in Carmignano
- Villa Batisti-Orlandi in Carmignano
- Villa Brandani in Carmignano
- Villa di Capezzana
- Villa Casale in Carmignano
- Villa Cremoncini in Carmignano
- Villa della Costa in Carmignano
- Villa della Rocca in Carmignano
- Villa di Calavria in Comeana
- Villa di Grumaggio in Grumaggio
- Villa di Pianetto in Pianetto
- Villa Elena in Il Poggiolo
- Villa I Boschetti in La Serra
- Villa I Renacci in I Renacci
- Villa La Torre in Carmignano
- Villa Le Falene in Le Farnete
- Villa Le Farnete in Le Farnete
- Villa Novelli in Colle Novelli
- Villa Olmi in Carmignano
- Villa Ramponi in Carmignano
- Villa Rinfreschi in Castelvecchio
- Villa san Michele in Carmignano
- Villa Vittoria in Lazzera

== Culture ==
Carmignano is home to the following festivals:

- Festival of San Michele and Palio of Donkeys in Carmignano (September–October)
- Old Fair in Carmignano 4–11 (December)
- Festival of the New Wine in Artimino (October)
- Welcome Dried Fig ("Benvenuto Fico Secco") in Carmignano (October)
- Comeana Fair (July)
- Procession commemorating the Passion and Death of Jesus Christ in Comeana (July every 3 years, last in 2012)
- Festival of the Threshing in Seano (July)
- The Fly and the Moon in Carmignano (October)
- Festival of the Chestnut in Bacchereto (October)
- Festival of the Cherry in Bacchereto (July)
- Festival of Polenta, Porcini and Boar in Poggio alla Malva (September)
