= Palazzo Nasi =

Coordinates: 43°45′53.89″N 11°15′28.77″E

The Palazzo Nasi, also known as the Palazzo Torrigiani or Palazzo Scarlatti, is a palace located at Piazza de' Mozzi 4, down the street where the Ponte alle Grazie enters the Oltrarno, in Florence, Tuscany, Italy. Another Palazzo Torrigiani Del Nero, with a Mannerist or late-Renaissance-style facade stands closer to the river. Both palaces also once belonged to the Nasi. The palace is a few steps from the Palazzo Mozzi.

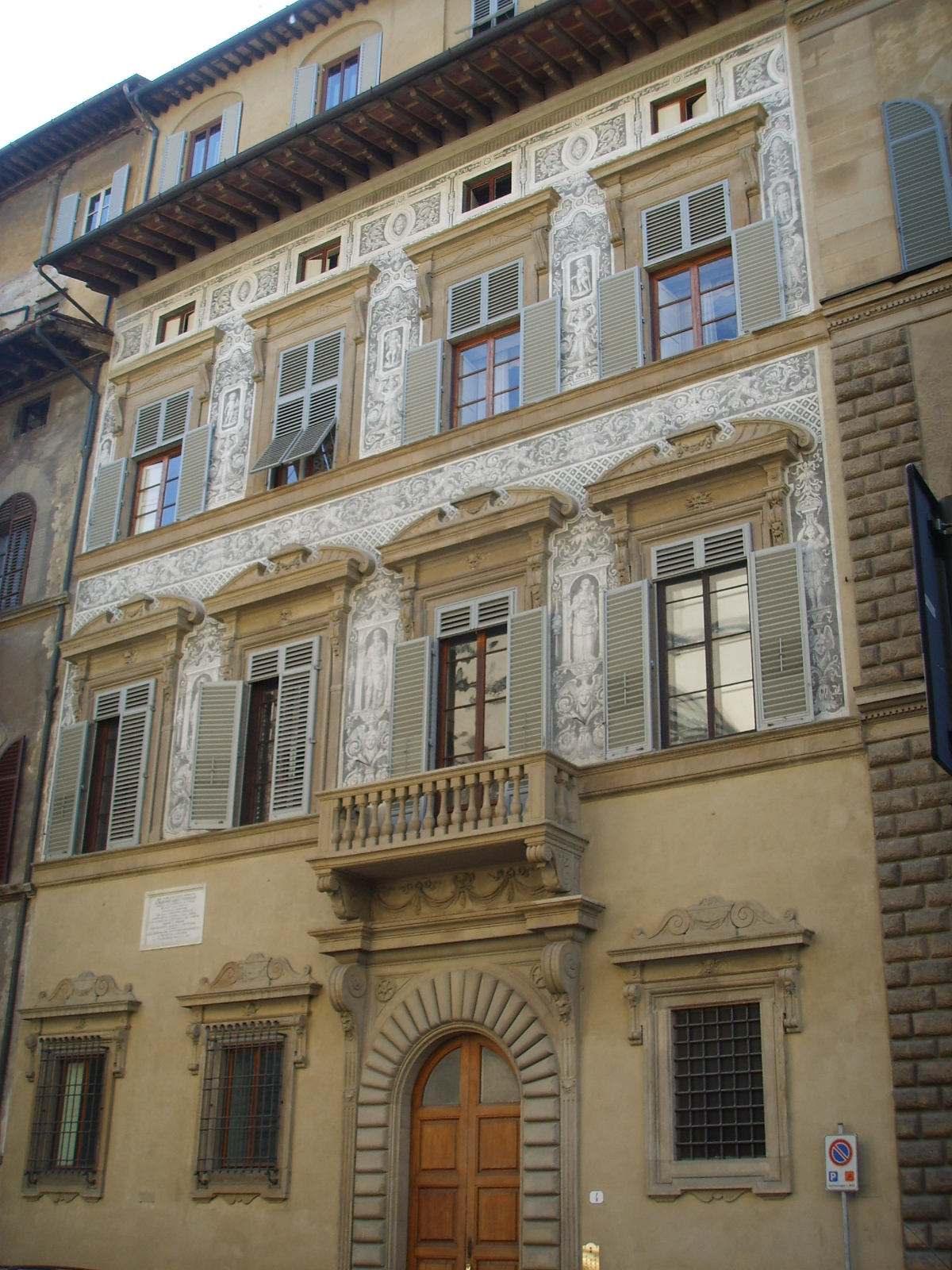
Facade of Palazzo Nasi with graffito.

== History ==
The general area, prior to the mid 14th-century, belonged to the Bardi, Benci, Banchi, and Nasi. The latter between 1460 and 1469 consolidated their holdings into one palace. Giorgio Vasari indicated that the palace was begun under the direction of the architect Baccio d'Agnolo, and completed by his son, Domenico. In 1552, the palace was sold to the Del Nero family. This small palace underwent further refurbishment by Filippo Baglioni.

The Del Nero family was prominent in 15th-century Florence. Bernardo Del Nero had been Gonfaloniere of Justice three times, and helped lead armies of the state against Costanzo I Sforza and the Genoese. However, his loyalty to the Medici led to his arrest and execution in 1497. One source states the palace was willed by Baron Cerbone Del Nero to Torrigiani in 1816.

Other sources state the Del Nero family sold it to the Scarlatti family. This latter family appears to have employed Alfonso Parigi the Elder in refurbishment. The dating of the facade and the graffito is unclear; most sources date it to around the first half of the seventeenth century.

The palace was subsequently acquired by Torrigiani, who were owners until the 1960s. The added a further floor. The building is now divided into multiple private apartments.

The Torrigiani family gained prominence in the 18th century. One member was archbishop of Lucca. Another member, Raffaelo was made Marquis in the Papal States in 1712. Another was cardinal Luigi Torrigiani, who served as secretary of state to Pope Clement XIII. He left the palace and his property to his sister's son, Pietro Guadagni, who then took the surname Torrigiani. Pietro was initially arrested by the Republican French authorities, but collaborated with Napoleon, gaining appointment to the Council of the Department of the Arno, and later as a baron. He became a French citizen in 1812, but reverted to Tuscan citizenship and was elected a senator in the restored Grand-Duchy. His brother, Carlo, was dedicated to improving education and the conditions of prisoners. He was known for his charity, including service during the cholera outbreak of 1855.

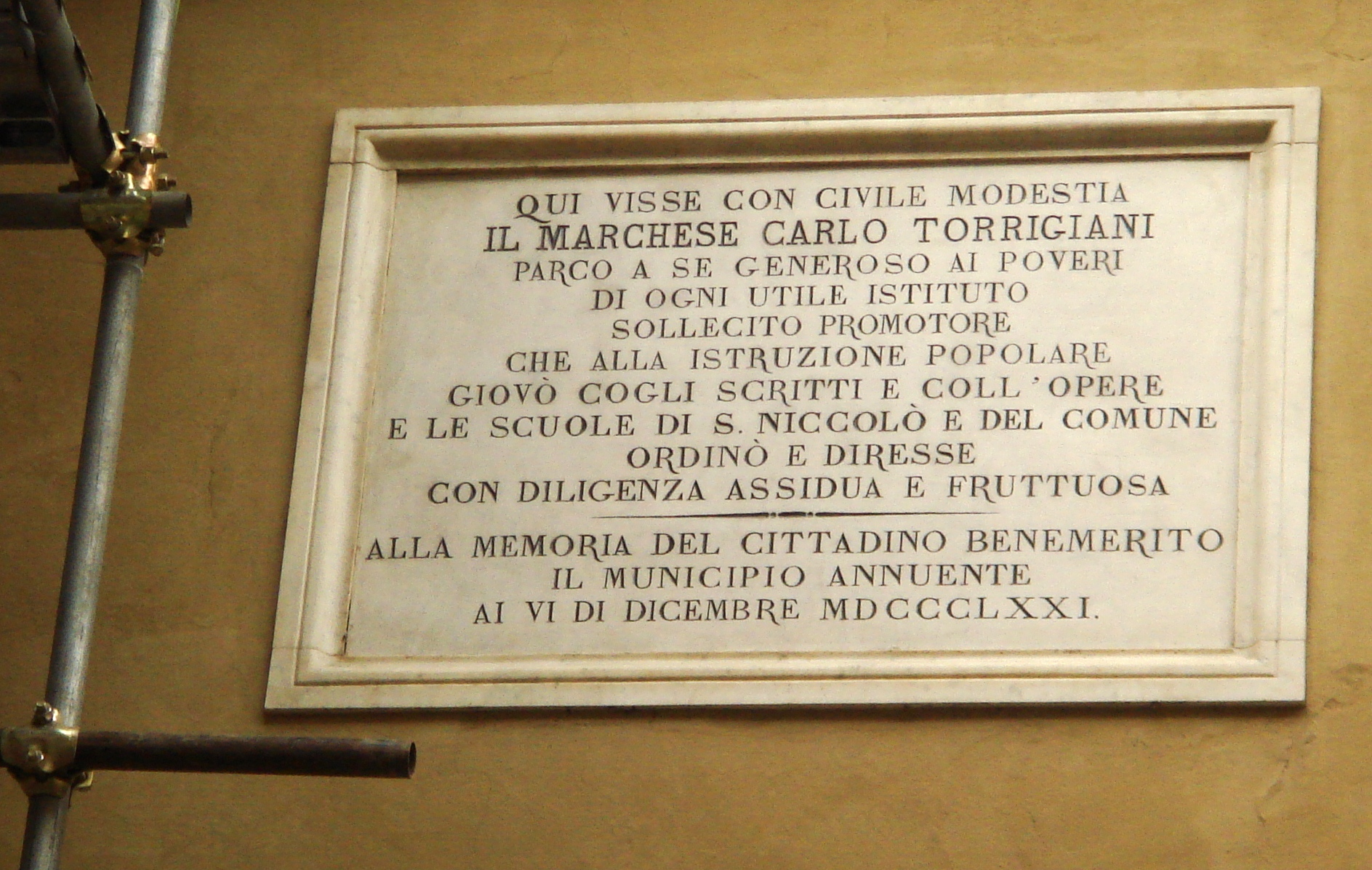
Plaque of façade of palace recalling Carlo Torrigiano

Tradition holds that in the 16th century, Nicolas Nasi sponsored a party with dancing to lure the wife of Luigi Capponi, the beautiful Luisa Strozzi, for whom the Duke Alessandro de'Medici had an amorous interest.
