= Palazzo Torrigiani Del Nero =

Coordinates: 43°45′55.15″N 11°15′29.26″E

The Palazzo Torrigiani Del Nero is a Renaissance-style palace located at Piazza de' Mozzi 5, down the street where the Ponte alle Grazie enters the Oltrarno in Florence, Tuscany, Italy. Another Palazzo Torrigiani stands alongside, the smaller Palazzo Nasi. Both palaces also once belonged to the Nasi.

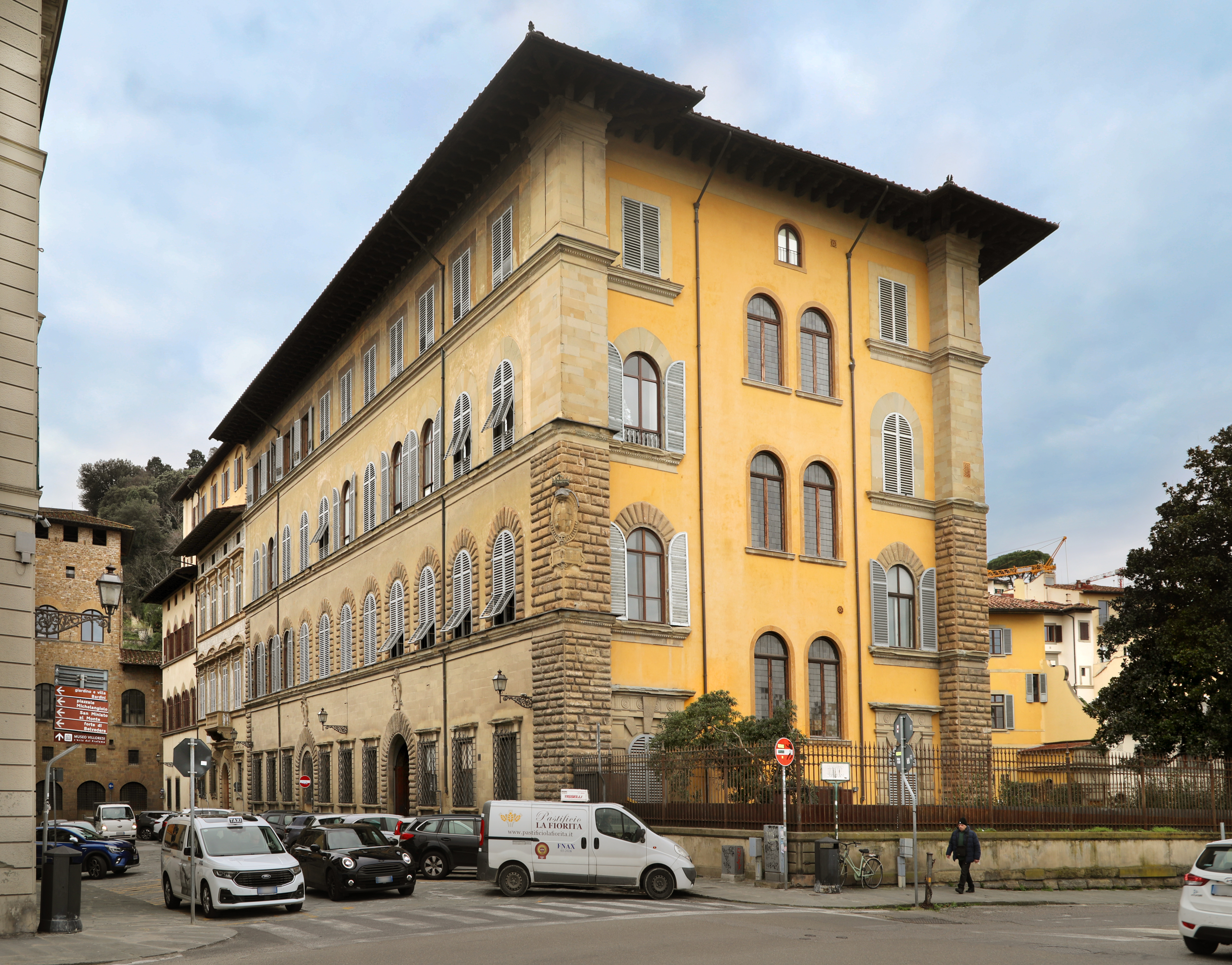
Palazzo Torrigiani Del Nero.

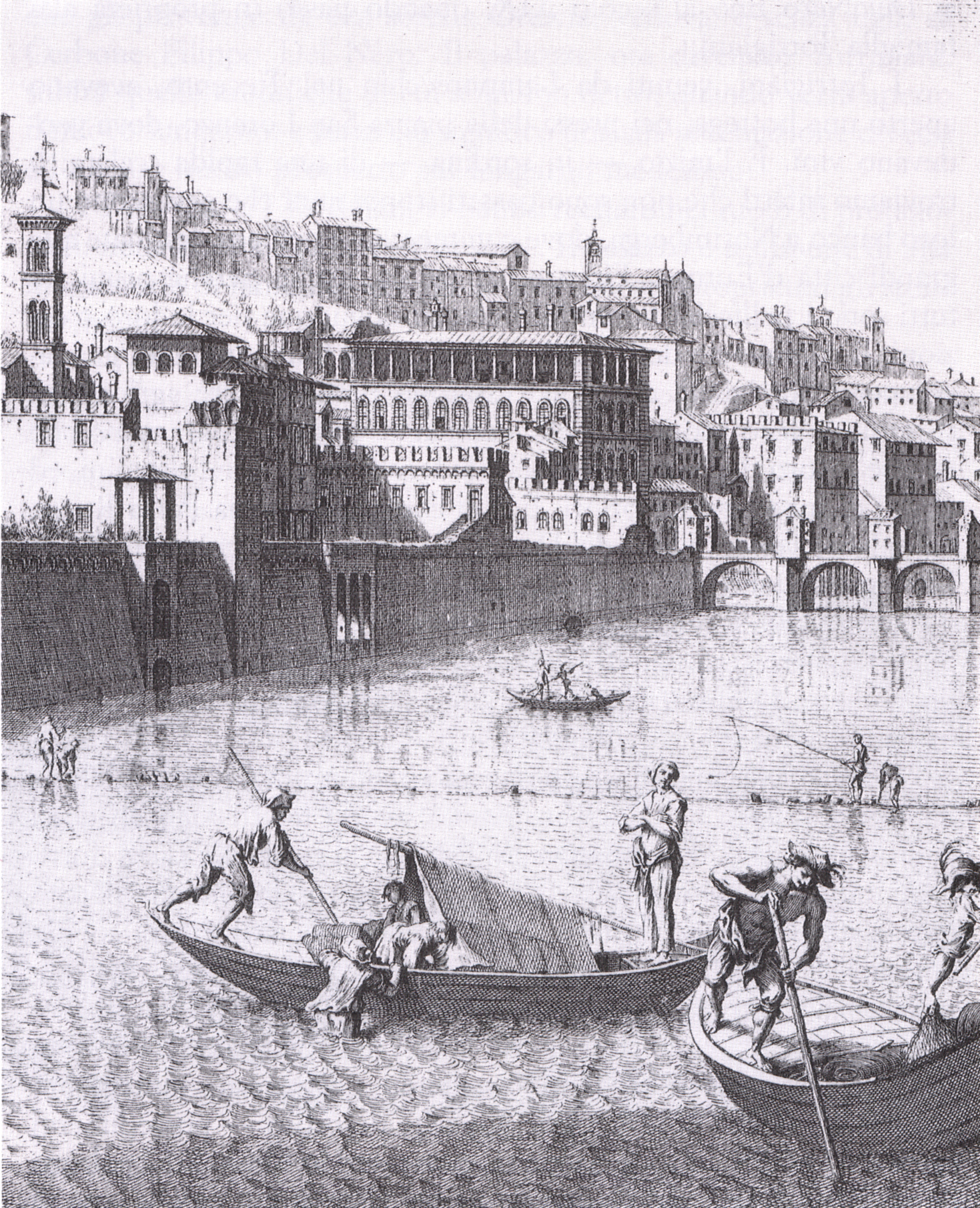
Print of the Arno Bank at Ponte alle Grazie, with three story Palazzo Del Nero in background (1744) by Giuseppe Zocchi.

The general area prior to the mid 14th-century, belonged to the Bardi, Benci, Banchi, and Nasi. The latter between 1460 and 1469 consolidated their holdings into one palace. Giorgio Vasari indicated that the palace was begun under the direction of the architect Baccio d'Agnolo, and completed by his son, Domenico.

Older prints of the palace note that the upper floors were part of an open loggia overlooking the River. In 1552, the palace was sold to the Del Nero family. In 1816, the palace was inherited by the Torrigiani.

The rusticated stone portals, window arches, and corner pilasters, as well as the brackets of the first floor windows are characteristic of the Mannerist architecture of Baccio. The aesthetics of the building were altered with the creation of fourth floor with smoothed stone blocks, and the sealing of the third floor loggia to make further rooms. The river facade has an awkward positioning of windows relative to the other sides. The former gardens extended east along the riverbank; they were mostly sold off, and now house an Evangelical Lutheran church on Via de'Bardi, built in 1901.
