= Palazzo Antinori =

Coordinates: 43°46′22.14″N 11°15′4.06″E

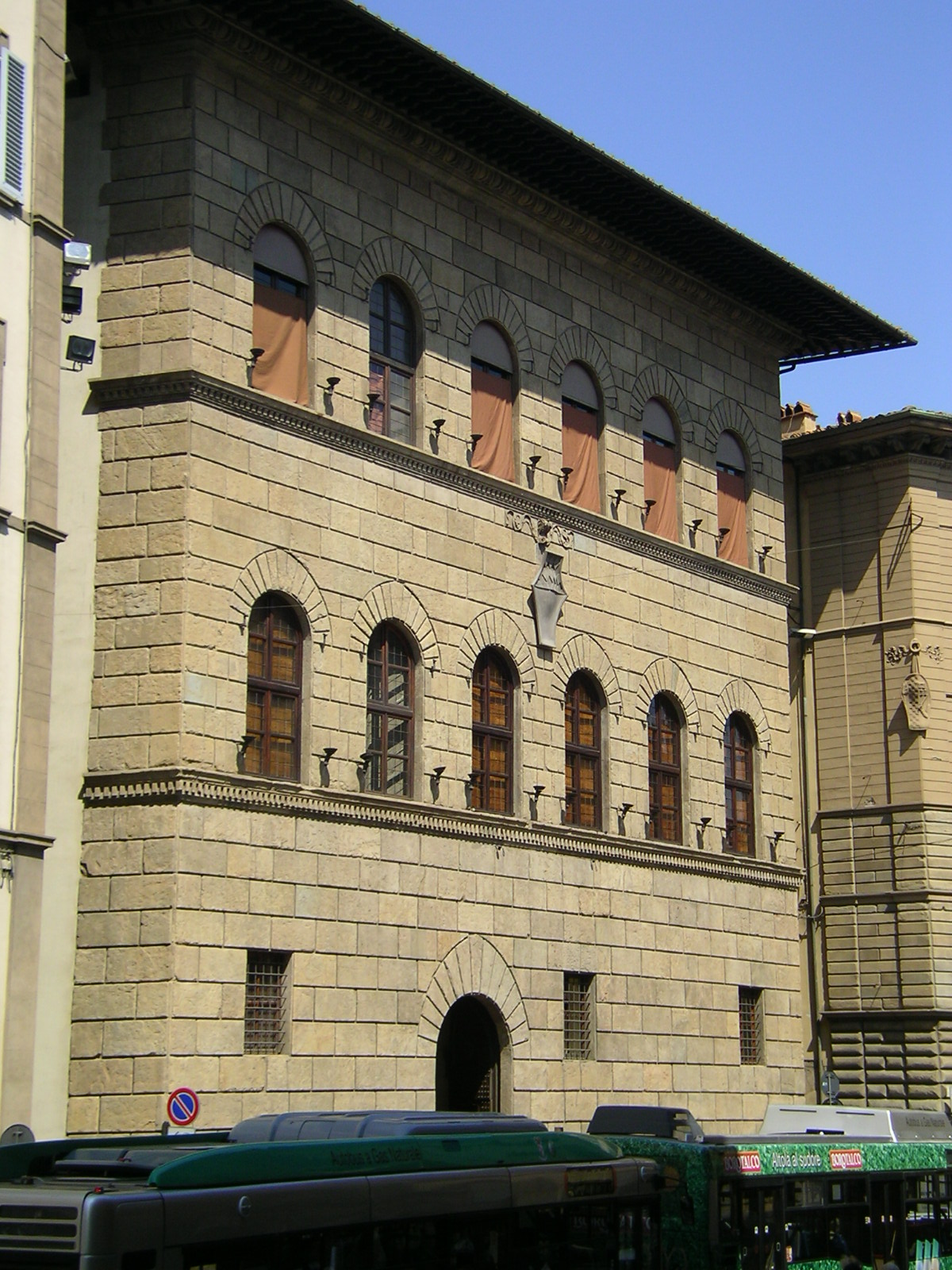
Façade of Antinori palace

Palazzo Antinori is a Renaissance palace located at the north end of Via de' Tornabuoni, where it makes an odd corner with Via dei Pecori, Via del Trebbio, and converts into Via dei Rondinelli, in Florence, Italy.

== History ==
The palace was built in 1461–1469, perhaps under the design of Giuliano da Maiano, commissioned by Giovanni di Bono Boni. The unfinished palace was sold in 1475 to the Martelli family; in 1506, they sold it to Nicolò Antinori, who commissioned several modification (rear façade) and embellishments (internal garden), perhaps to Baccio d'Agnolo. From the 1920s to 1965 (with gap for the war), the palace housed the British Institute of Florence.

The edifice is still property of the Antinori family, and two top floors are still occupied by a member of the family.

== Description ==
Palazzo Antinori has a rectangular plan and was partially inspired by Palazzo Medici. The interior has a Renaissance portico on three sides, with round arches, cross vaults and sandstone (pietra serena) columns with sculpted capitals. The pivots of the vaults have similar decorations.

On a wall is 18th-century-style niche with a fountain with a statue of Venus and sponge-like rocks.

The garden is accessed through an internal gate which is similar to that in Palazzo Bartolini Salimbeni, which led to the attribution of the 16th-century renovations to Baccio d'Agnolo.

== Sources ==
- Vannucci, Marcello (1995). Splendidi palazzi di Firenze. Florence: Le Lettere.
