= Pharaoh with his Butler and Baker =

Painting by Pontormo

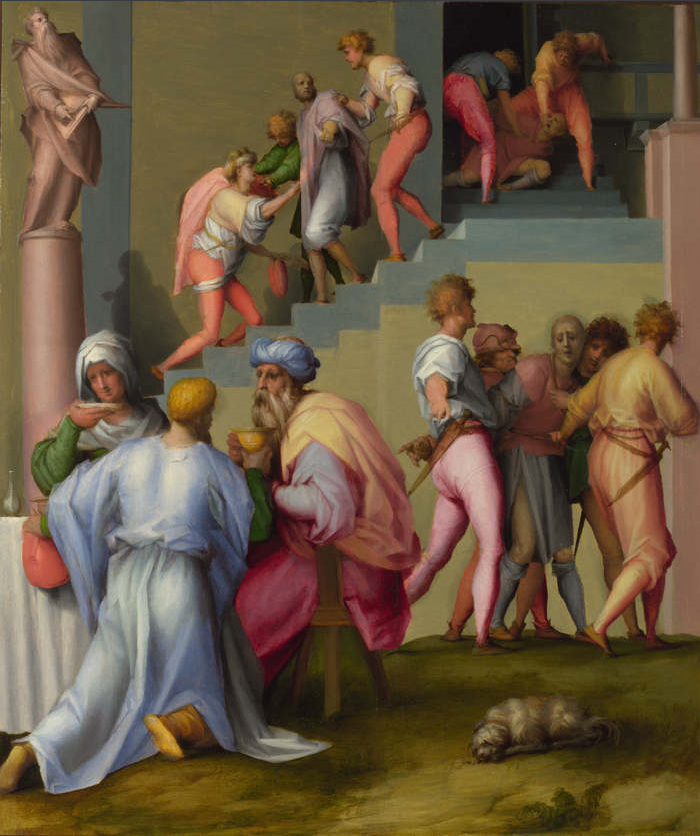
Pharaoh with his Butler and Baker (c. 1515) by Pontormo

Pharaoh with his Butler and Baker is an oil on panel painting by Pontormo, executed c.1515, now in the National Gallery, London. Like Joseph Sold to Potiphar, Joseph in Egypt, and Joseph's Brothers Beg for Help (all also in the National Gallery), it was originally painted for the Marriage Chamber at the Palazzo Borgherini in Florence, Italy.
