= The Choice of Hercules =

The Choice of Hercules may refer to:

- Hercules at the crossroads, ancient Greek parable also known as "The Choice of Hercules"
- The Choice of Hercules (Beccafumi), c. 1520–1525 painting
- The Choice of Hercules (Carracci), 1596 painting
- The Choice of Hercules (Handel), 1750 oratorio
