= Apostoli =

Apostoli, the Italian term for Apostles, may refer to:

- Santi Apostoli, Florence, church
- Santi Apostoli, Rome 6th-century basilica in Rome
- Fred Apostoli, (1913–1973), boxer known as The Boxing Bell Hop
