= Joseph Sold to Potiphar =

Painting by Pontormo

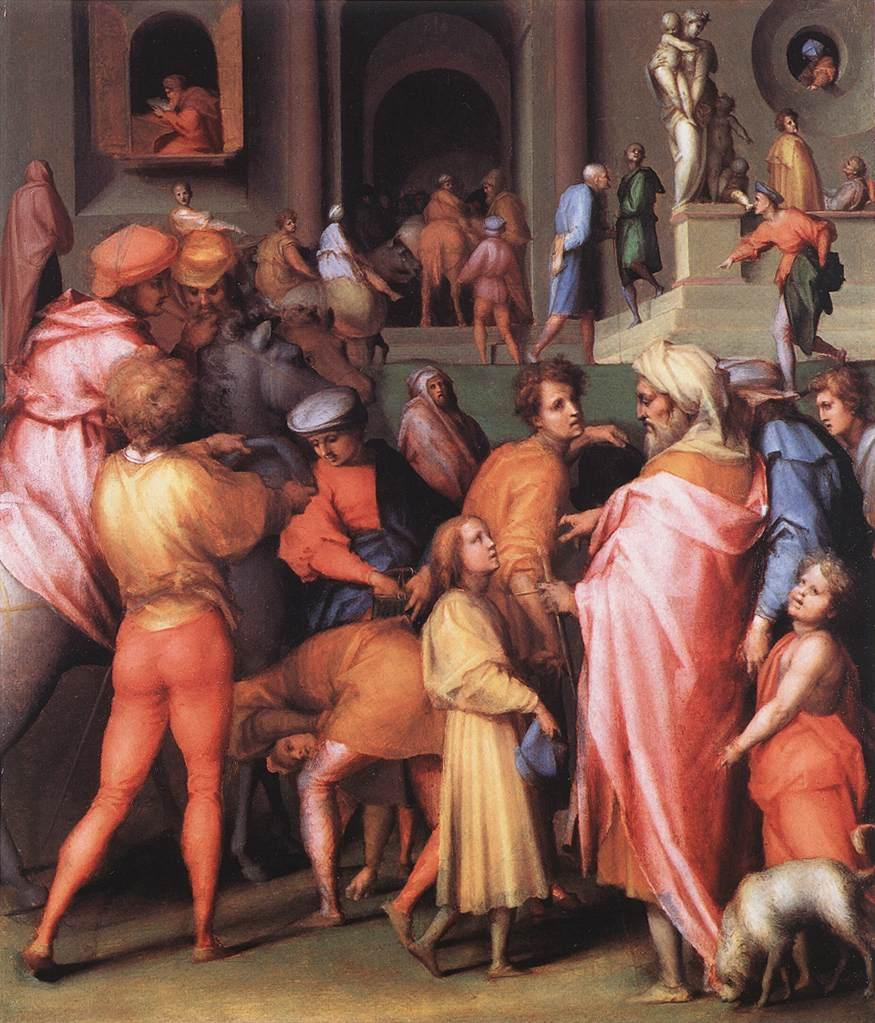
Joseph Sold to Potiphar (c. 1515) by Pontormo

Joseph Sold to Potiphar is an oil on panel painting by Pontormo, executed c. 1515, now in the National Gallery in London. Like The Baker Tortured, Joseph in Egypt and Joseph's Brothers Ask Him For Help (all also in the National Gallery), it was originally painted for the Marriage Chamber of the Palazzo Borgherini.
