= Joseph in Egypt (painting) =

Painting by Pontormo

Joseph with Jacob in Egypt
- Joseph in Egypt
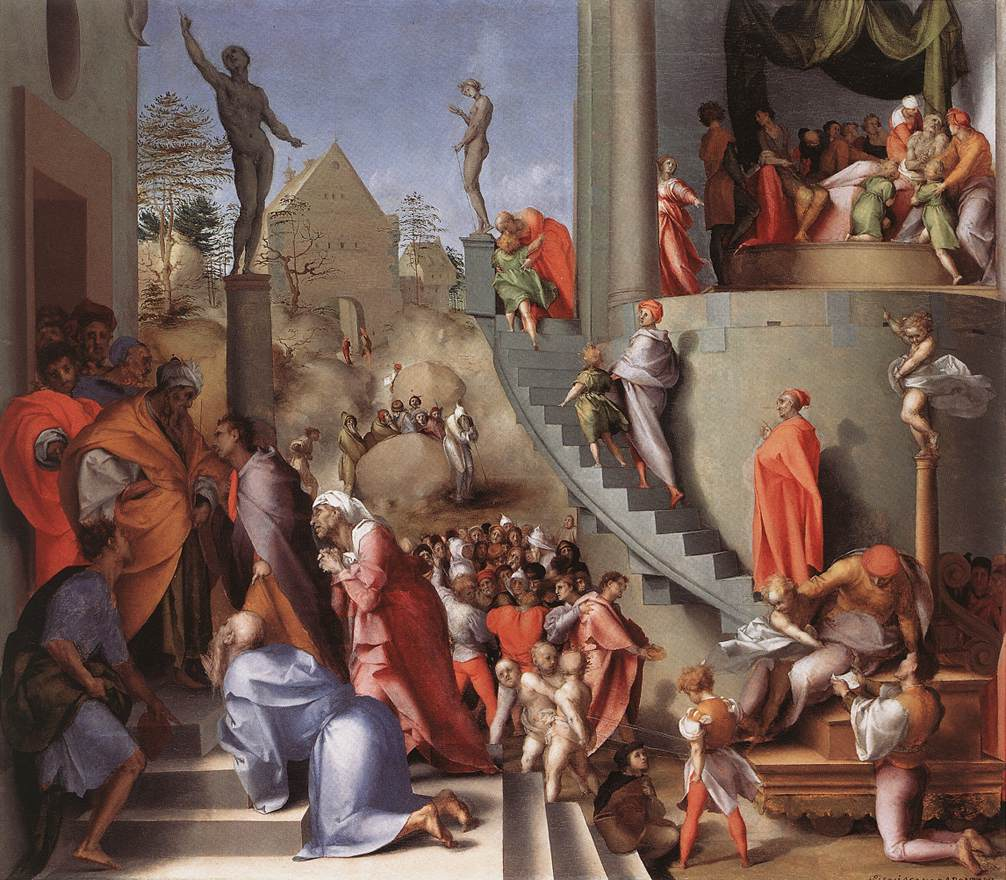
- Artist: Pontormo
- Year: 1518 (Julian)
- Dimensions: 96 cm (38 in) × 109 cm (43 in)
- Location: National Gallery
- Identifiers: Art UK artwork ID: joseph-with-jacob-in-egypt-114641

Joseph in Egypt is an oil painting on panel of c. 1518 by Pontormo, now in the National Gallery in London, which bought it in 1882. Like the same artist's Joseph's Brothers Beg for Help, Joseph Sold to Potiphar and Pharaoh with his Butler and Baker (all also in the National Gallery), it was originally part of the Marriage Chamber in the Palazzo Borgherini in Florence.
