= Santi Apostoli, Florence =

Historic church in Florence, Italy

Coordinates: 43.769312°N 11.252339°E

Church of Santi Apostoli (Chiesa dei Santi Apostoli)
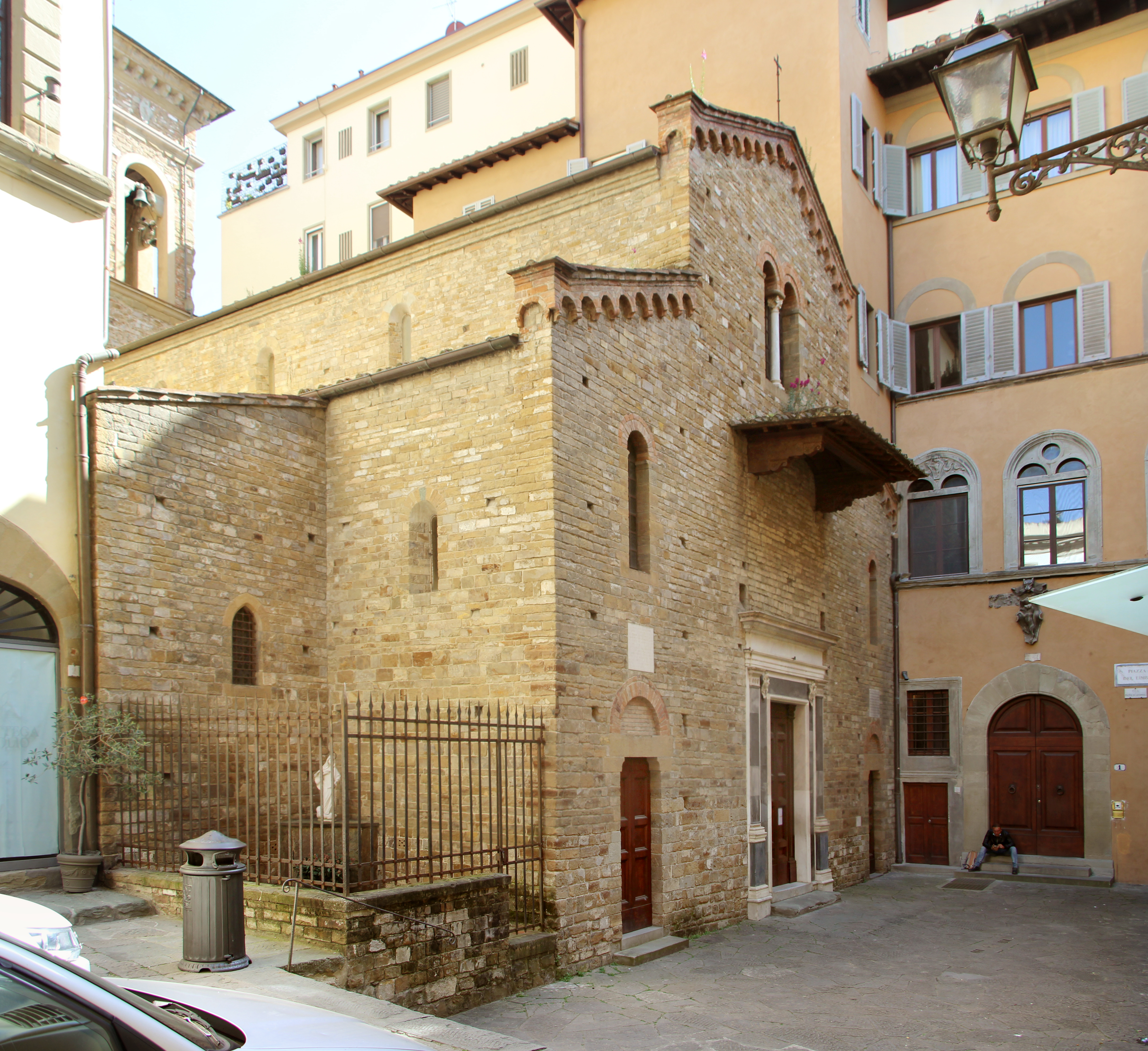
- The unfinished façade of Santi Apostoli

Religion
- Affiliation: Roman Catholic
- Province: Florence

Location
- Location: Florence, Italy
- Interactive map of Church of Santi Apostoli (Chiesa dei Santi Apostoli)

Architecture
- Type: Church

The Church of Santi Apostoli is a Romanesque-style, Roman Catholic church in the historic center of Florence, in the Tuscany region of Italy. It is among the oldest church buildings in Florence.

== History ==
The church was built in the 11th century, and though remodelled in the 15th and 16th centuries, is one of the few in the city to have maintained its High Middle Age features. Tradition recalls that Michelangelo convinced Bindo Altoviti, who planned to raise the ground level, not to rebuild, but instead preserve the church. It faces the Piazza del Limbo (Limbo Square), so-called because in medieval times it housed a cemetery for children and infants who had died before being baptized. It is adjacent to the Palazzo Borgherini-Rosselli del Turco.

A slab on the façade attributes the foundation to Charlemagne and his paladin Roland, in the year 800, but scholars assign it to the 11th century. A small bell tower was added by Baccio d'Agnolo in the 16th century.

The simple façade, in Romanesque style, has a portal attributed to Benedetto da Rovezzano.

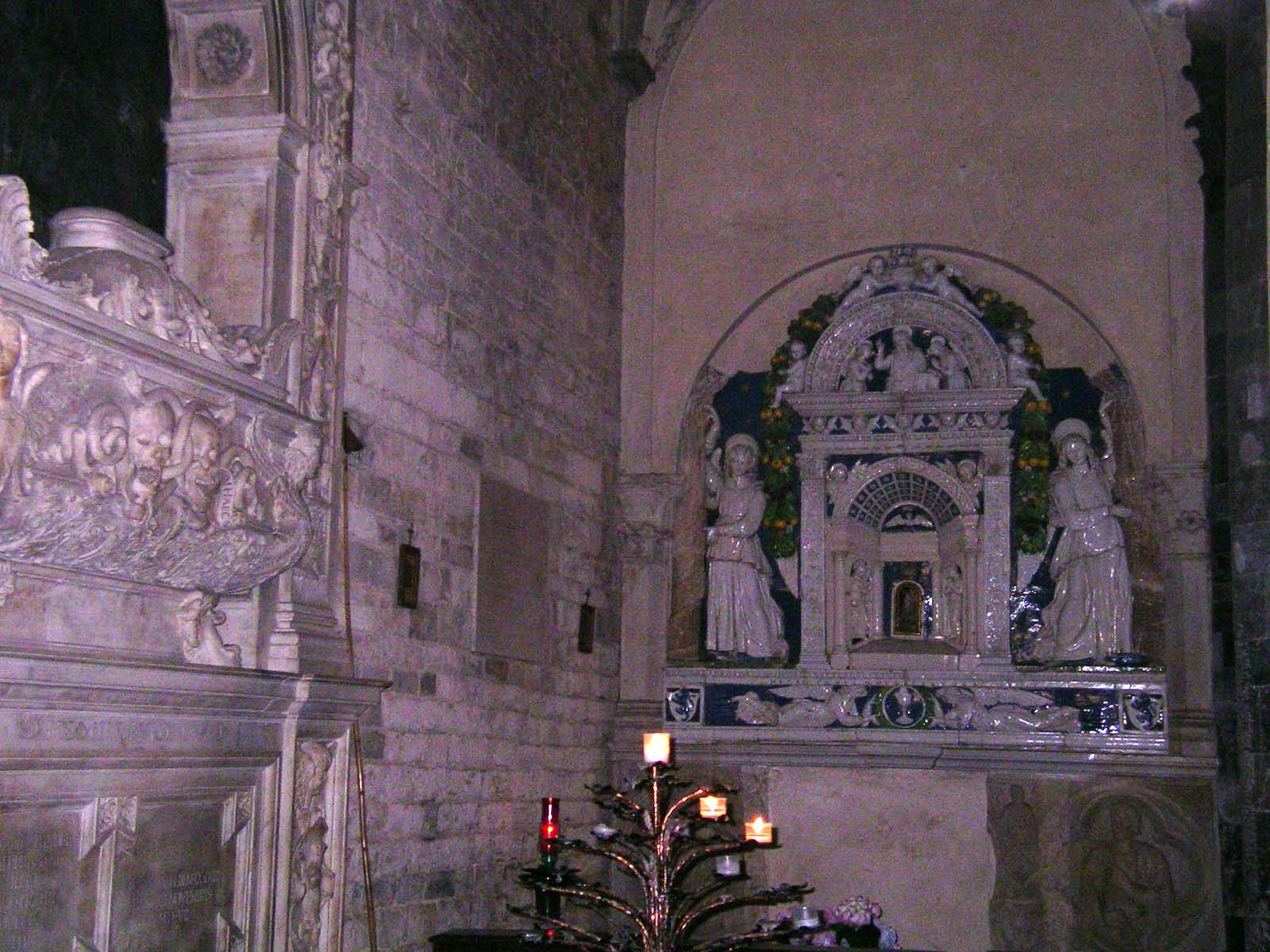
The tabernacle by Giovanni della Robbia and the tomb of Oddo Altoviti.

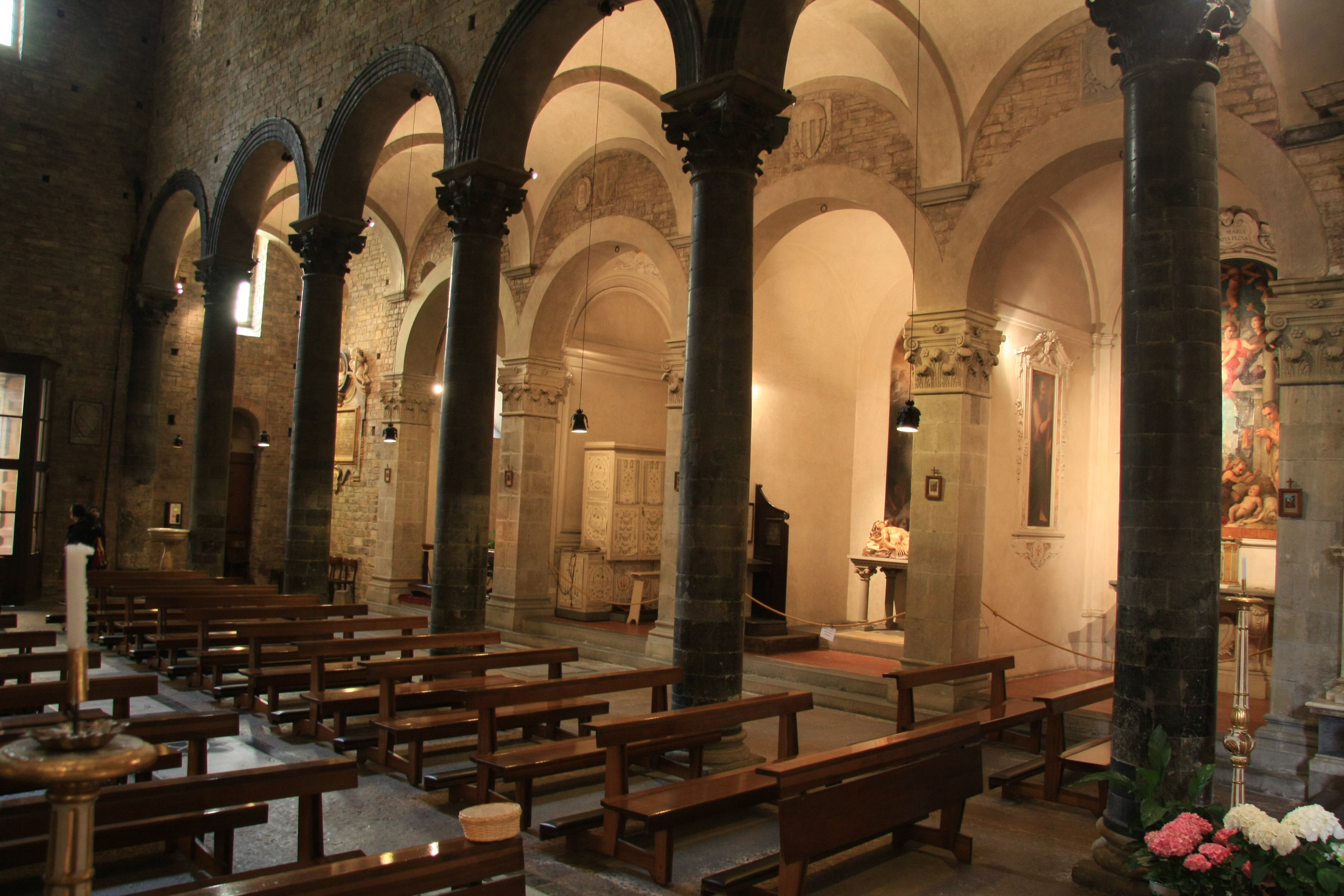
Interior of Santi Apostoli

== Interior ==
The plan, with a nave and two aisles with a semicircular apse, still shows Palaeo-Christian influences. It has green marble columns from Prato with capitals stripped from ancient Roman remains (the Corinthian ones probably coming from the baths existing in the area). The richly decorated wooden ceiling was added in 1333. Noteworthy is the pavement, with a mosaic from the original edifice which was later restored with the contributions of outstanding Florentine families (Acciaioli, Altoviti and others). the apse area has maintained the Romanesque appearance, with undecorated stones visible. The side chapels are from the 16th century.

On the left of the apse are a polychrome terracotta tabernacle by Giovanni della Robbia. To right of the entrance is the tomb with the bust of Anna Ubaldi, mother of the Gran Priore del Bene, the bust was sculpted by Giovanni Battista Foggini. The 2nd chapel on the right, chapel of San Bartolomeo was completed in the 16th century. The right wall has a stucco depicting San Paolo, and on the left wall the sepulchral monument of Piero del Bene (1530).

At the end of the nave above the door that leads to the Canon's hall is the sepulchral monument of Bindi di Stoldo Altoviti (Bindo Altoviti) (1570) with a statue of Faith and two putti by followers of Bartolomeo Ammannati. On the apse is the monument of Antonio Altoviti and the bust of Charlemagne and Antonio Altoviti by Giovanni Caccini. On the left nave is the monument to Oddo Altoviti (1507-1510 by Benedetto da Rovezzano. The 4th chapel on the left has an altarpiece with the Adoration of the Shepherds and on the wall, Archangel Raphael with Tobias and St Andrew Apostle (c 1560 by Maso da San Friano. The 3rd chapel on the left has an Archangel Michael defeats Lucifer (16th century by Alessandro Fei, the 2nd chapel has frescoes depicting the Glory of San Giovanni di Chantal by Matteo Bonechi. The first chapel has a Madonna, Child and Angels a copy of a Paolo Schiavo originally on the facade of church.

The church houses three flints (Pietre del Santo Sepolcro) putatively from the Holy Sepulchre in Jerusalem. These were putatively used to light the lamps of the tomb when Jesus was buried. Tradition holds that they were acquired in 1101 by Pazzino dei Pazzi, who was among the first Christians to scale the walls and lead to the capture of Jerusalem during the First Crusade. From then on, the Pazzi included a flaming cup in their coat of arms. The flints are linked to the ceremony of Lo Scoppio del Carro and the lighting of fireworks from the Portafuoco after a celebratory mass.

== Sources ==
- Guida d'Italia, Firenze e provincia. Milan: Touring Club Italiano. 2007.
