= Benedetto da Rovezzano =

Italian architect and sculptor

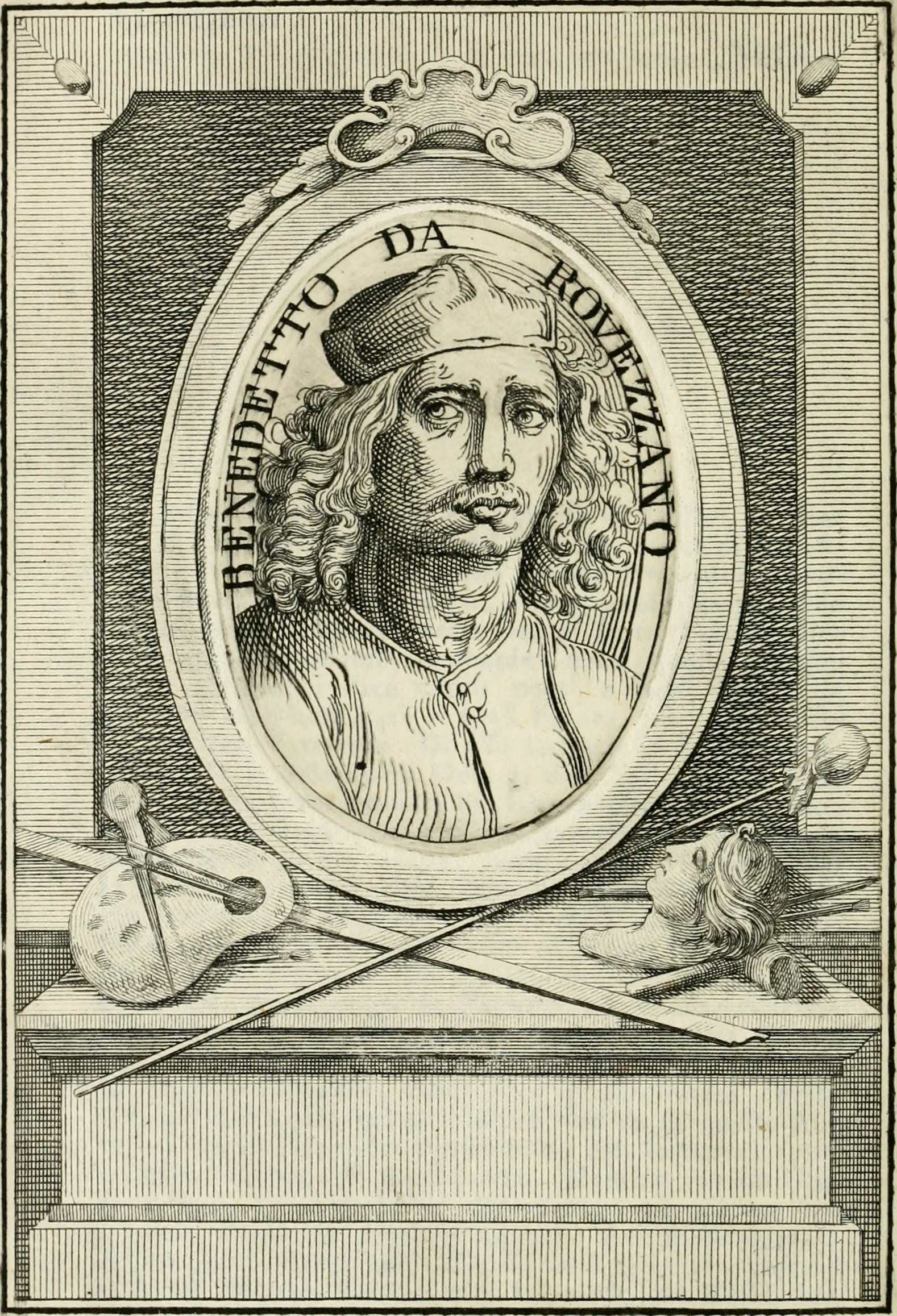
Portrait of Benedetto Grazzini

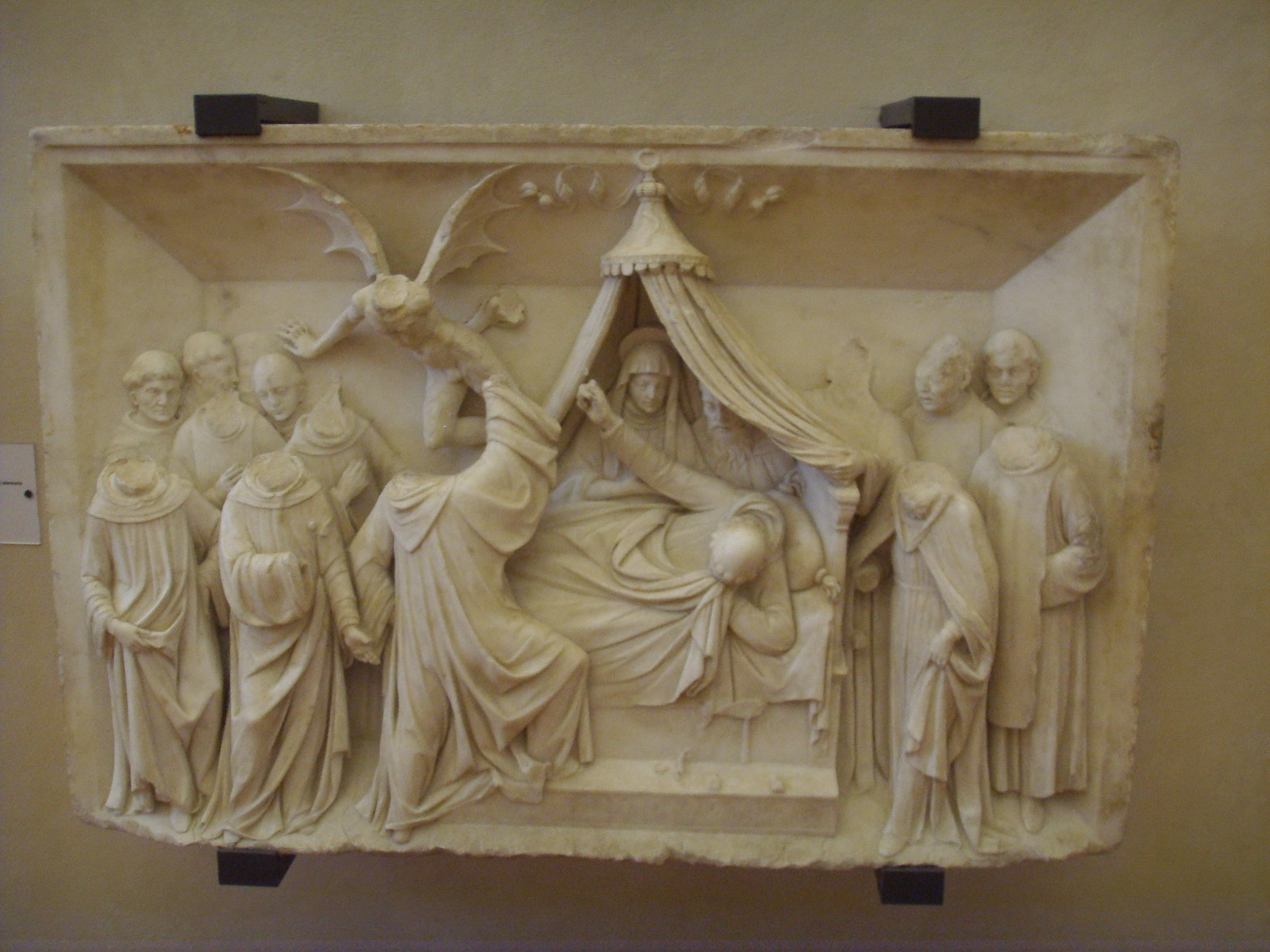
Panel from the sarcophagus of St. John Gualbert, Museum of San Salvi, Florence.

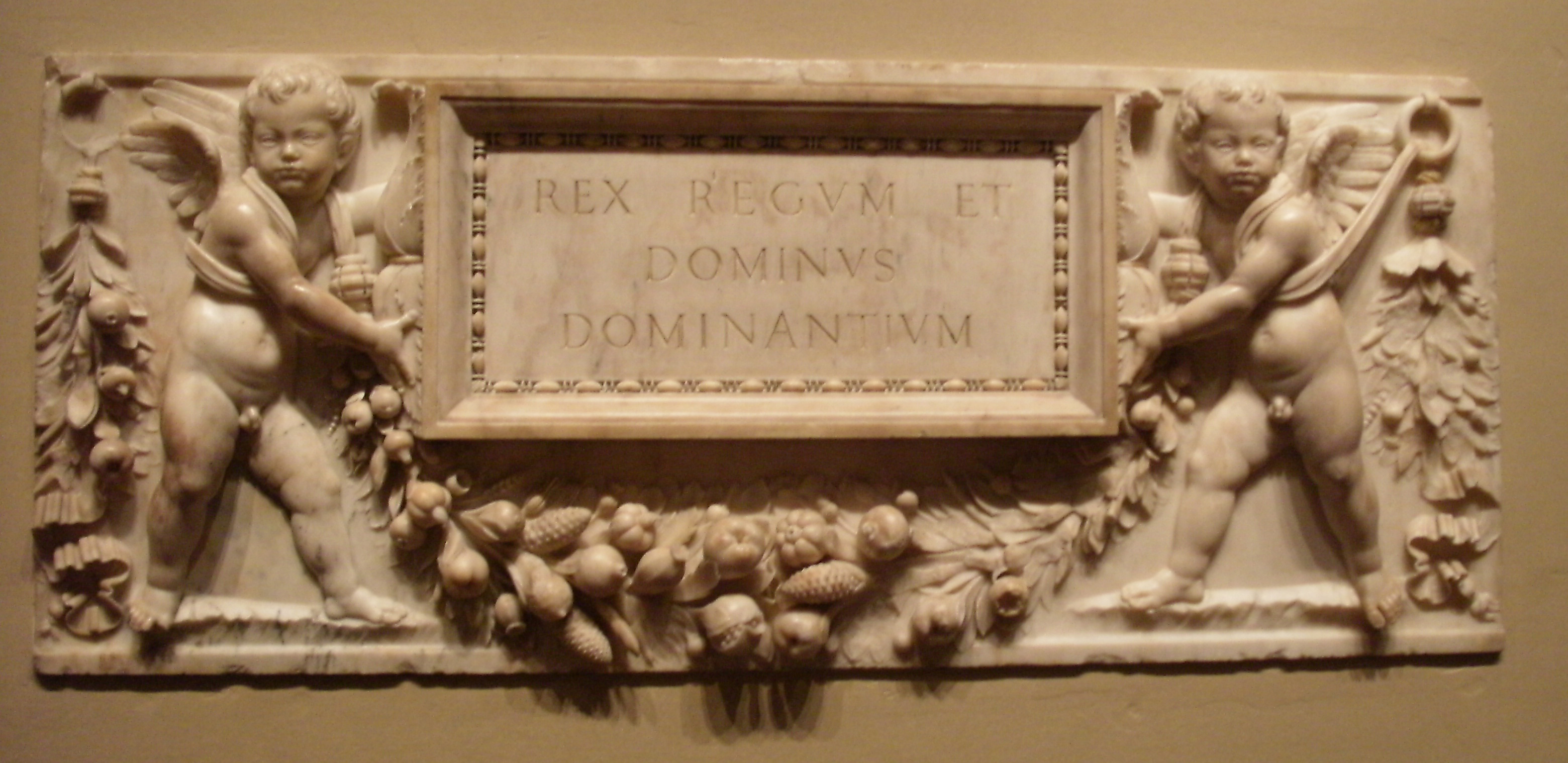
Relief from an altar, carved between 1517 and 1520, in the National Gallery of Art

Benedetto Grazzini, best known as Benedetto da Rovezzano (1474 – c. 1552) was an Italian architect and sculptor who worked mainly in Florence.

He was born in Pistoia in 1474, and adopted the name Rovezzano from the quarter of Florence in which he lived. His most important works include:

- Pandolfini Chapel and cloister of the Badia Fiorentina.
- Remains of the monument of St. John Gualbert and a chimney, now in Bargello Museum.
- Portal of the Church of Santi Apostoli.
- Marble cenotaph of Pier Soderini, church of the Carmine.
- Tabernacle of St. John the Evangelist, Santa Maria del Fiore.
- Three bas-reliefs in the church of San Salvi.

Pope Leo X sent twelve terra cotta medallions by Rovezzano to Cardinal Wolsey. The sculptor himself went to England in 1524. Wolsey commissioned a tomb for himself, but fell from royal favour before its completion, but King Henry VIII of England ordered its completion. King Charles I of England wished to be buried in it although it remained empty until Nelson was buried in it.

Four bronze angels designed by Rovezzano for Wolsey's tomb have come to light and were acquired by the Victoria and Albert Museum. Four large bronze candlesticks nearly 3 metres in height designed by Rovezzano were an addition to the tomb commissioned by King Henry VIII, and are now in the Saint Bavo's Cathedral, Ghent, having been acquired by the Bishop of Ghent Anthony Triest in the 17th century.
