= San Michele a Rovezzano =

San Michele Arcangelo also known as Sant'Angelo, is a paleo-Christian temple

Coordinates: 43°45′40″N 11°18′26″E

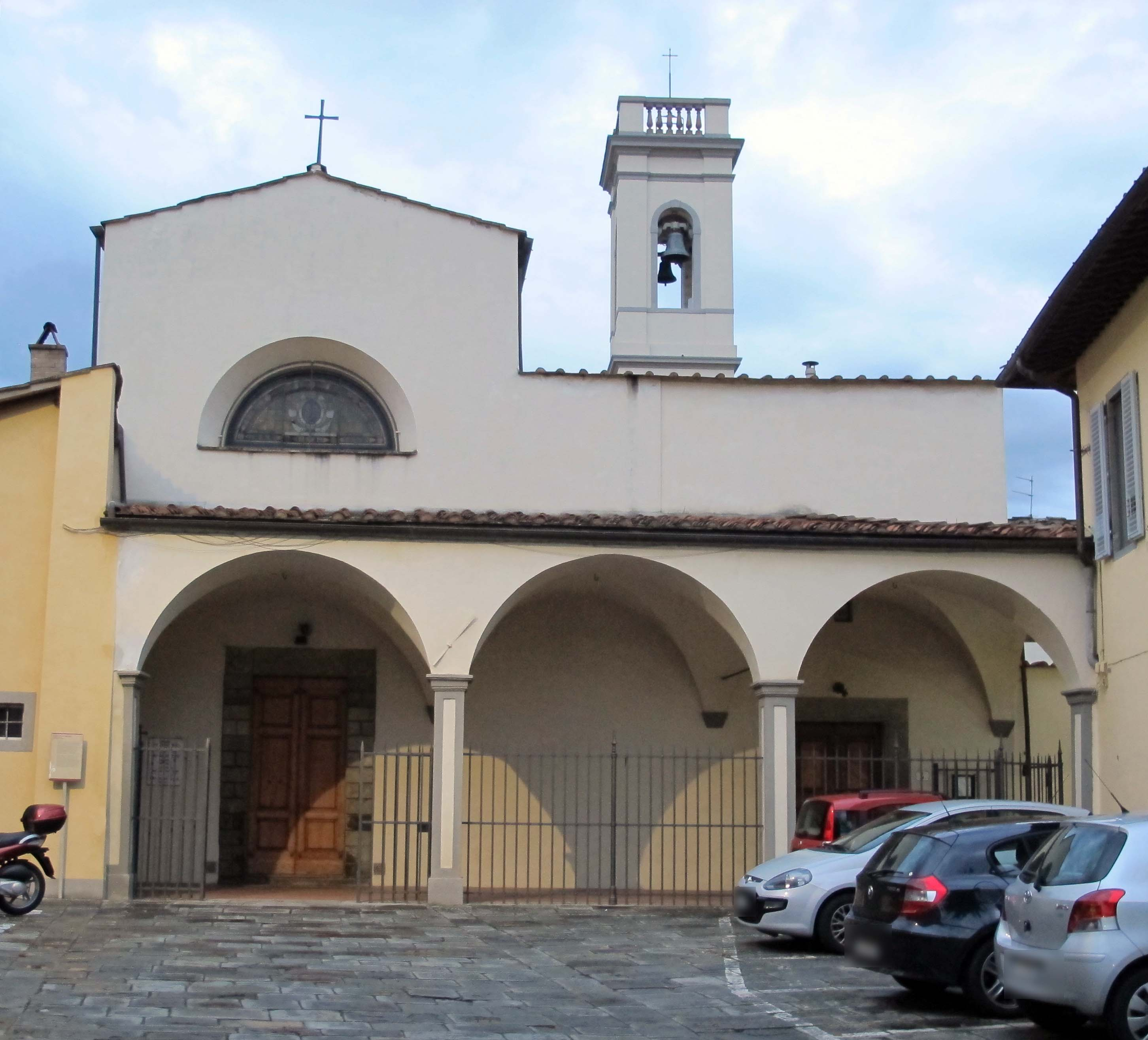

San Michele Arcangelo a Rovezzano is a Roman Catholic parish church located on Via Di S Michele A Rovezzano #4, in Florence, region of Tuscany, Italy.

== History ==
An earlier church located outside of the walls of Florence was replaced in 1810 by the parish. The portico of the 17th century remains. The door may have been carved by Baccio d'Agnolo. The interior contained an altarpiece depicting an Enthroned Madonna and child, along with an Annunciation. It had a painted crucifix in the adjacent oratory of Sant'Agostino. The façade of the Canon's house, had a tabernacle with a terracotta statue of St Michael Archangel, in the style of Giovanni della Robbia.
