= Joseph's Brothers Beg for Help =

Painting by Pontormo

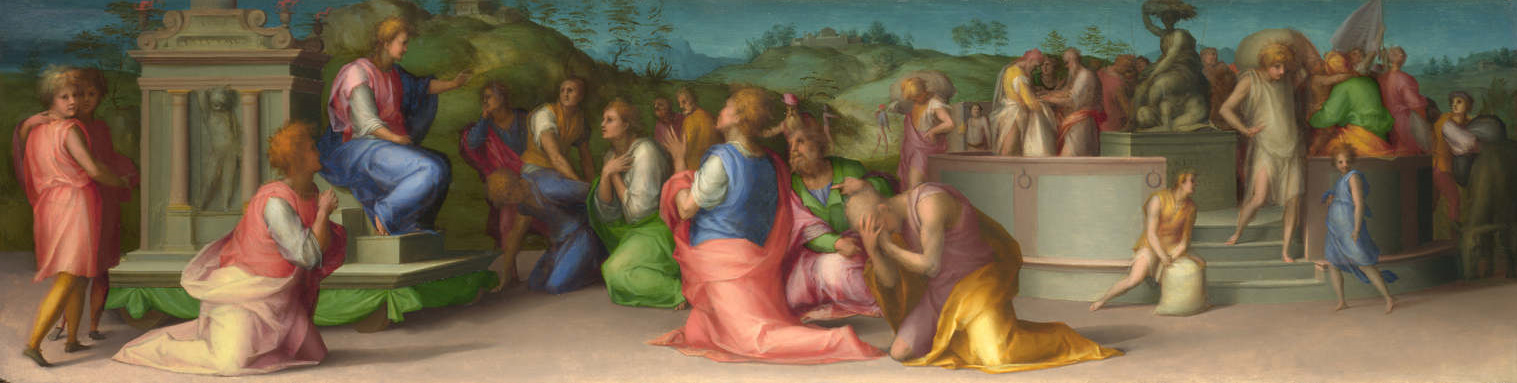
Joseph's Brothers Beg for Help (c. 1515) by Pontormo

Joseph's Brothers Beg for Help or Joseph Reveals Himself to his Brothers is an oil on panel painting by Pontormo, executed c. 1515, now in the National Gallery in London. Like Joseph in Egypt, Joseph Sold to Potiphar and Pharaoh with his Butler and Baker (all also now in the National Gallery), it is part of a series of works by the artist on the life of Joseph for the Marriage Chamber of the Palazzo Borgherini in Florence.
