= Palazzo Borgherini-Rosselli del Turco =

Building in Florence, Italy

Coordinates: 43.7693°N 11.2523°E

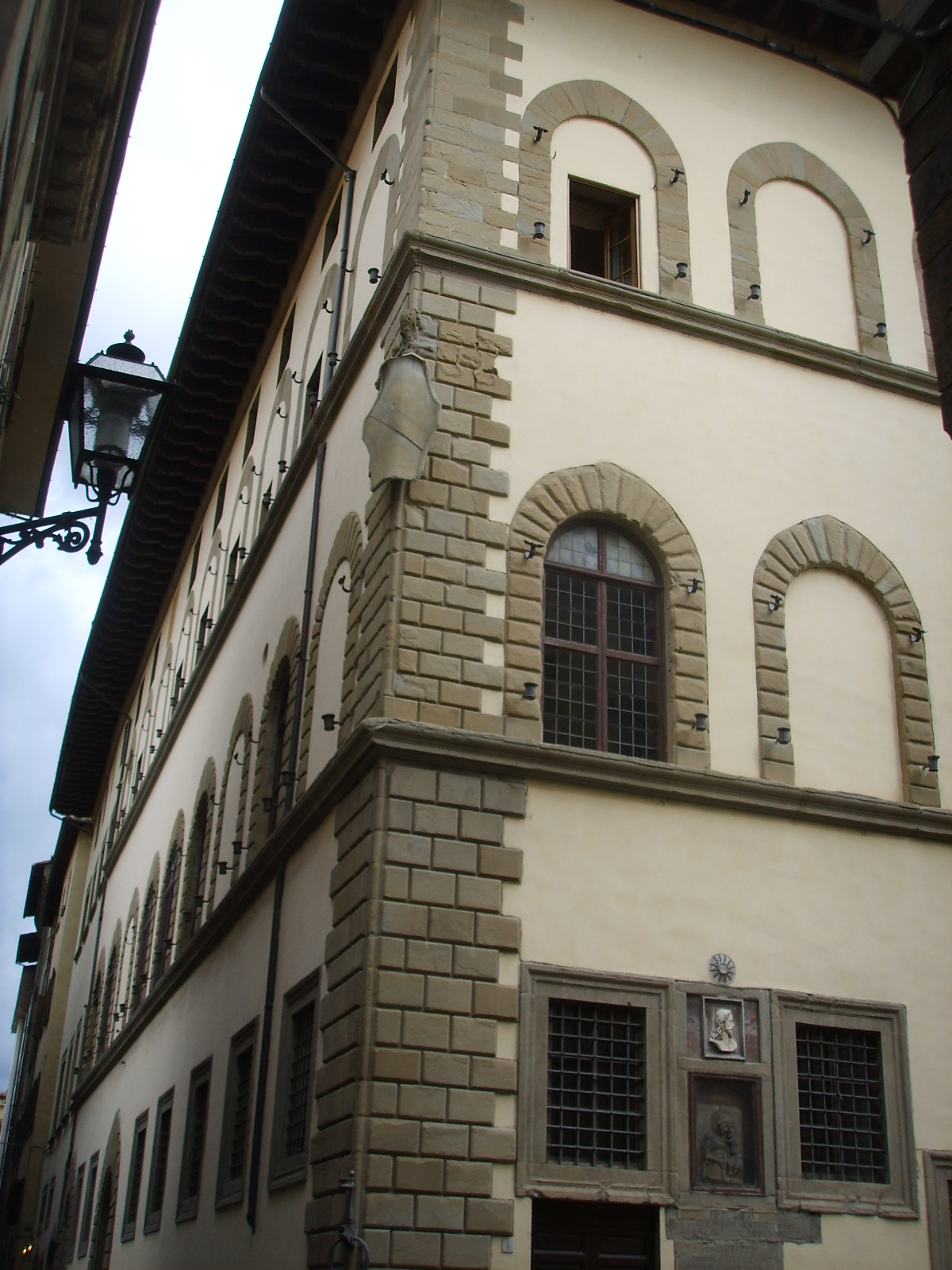
Facade of Palace

The Palazzo Borgherini-Rosselli del Turco is a Renaissance-style palace located in central Florence, region of Tuscany, Italy. It stands beside the church of Santi Apostoli. The palace was designed by Baccio d'Agnolo. From this palace, in 1529, were expropriated the chests containing panels painted by Jacopo Pontormo for the Borgherini.

The nearby Palazzo Bartolini Salimbeni on Piazza Santa Trinita was also designed by Baccio d'Agnolo
