= The Choice of Hercules (Beccafumi) =

Painting by Domenico Beccafumi

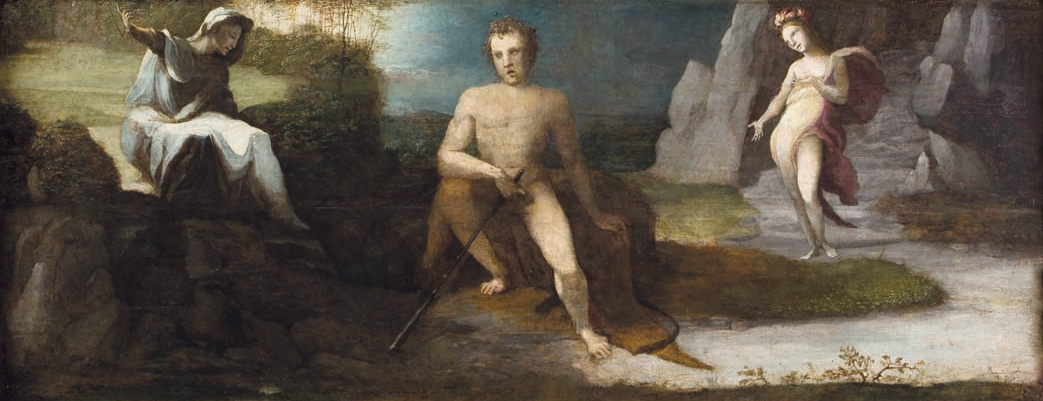
The Choice of Hercules (c. 1520–1525) by Domenico Beccafumi

The Choice of Hercules or Hercules at the Crossroads is an oil painting on canvas executed c.1520–1525 by the Italian Renaissance painter Domenico Beccafumi. It is now in the Museo Bardini in Florence. It is strongly influenced by Baldassarre Peruzzi's frieze at the Villa Farnesina, placing it after Beccafumi's possible trip to Rome around 1512.

Its provenance is unknown, though it is one of a series of panels produced by the artists for cassoni and spalliere. It was previously attributed to Bacchiacca but the present attribution is now held by the majority of art historians by comparison with Beccafumi's Deucalion and Pyrrha, similar in size and theme.
