= Filippo Baglioni =

Italian politician (1827–1901)

Member of the Chamber of Deputies
- In office 1882–1890

Mayor of Chieti
- In office 1876–1878
- Preceded by: Vincenzo Pera
- Succeeded by: Camillo Mezzanotte

Personal details
- Born: 4 December 1827 Ortona a Mare, Abruzzo Citeriore, Kingdom of the Two Sicilies
- Died: 2 October 1901 (aged 73) Chieti, Kingdom of Italy

Filippo Baglioni (4 December 1827 – 2 October 1901) was an Italian politician who served as mayor of Chieti (1876–1878) and Deputy (1882–1890). He was Count of Civitella Messer Raimondo.
