= Palazzo Bartolini Salimbeni =

Palace in central Florence, Italy

Coordinates: 43°46′12.68″N 11°15′6.09″E

The Palazzo Bartolini Salimbeni is a High Renaissance-style palace located on Via de' Tornabuoni on Piazza Trinita in central Florence, Italy.

Since 2018 the piano nobile of the palace hosts the Collezione Roberto Casamonti, an exhibition itinerary dedicated to modern and contemporary art from the late 19th century to the early 21st century.

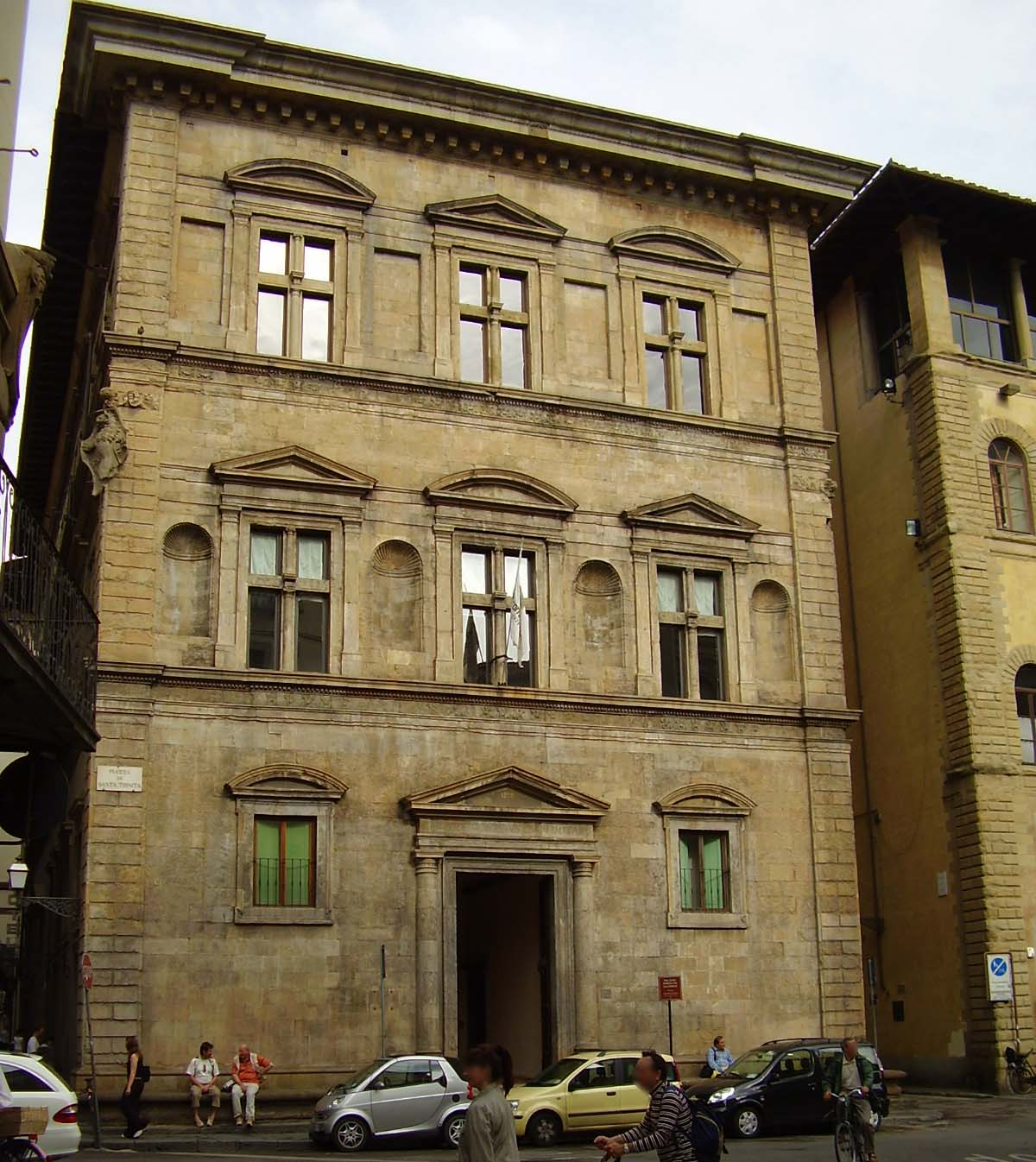
Palazzo Bartolini Salimbeni

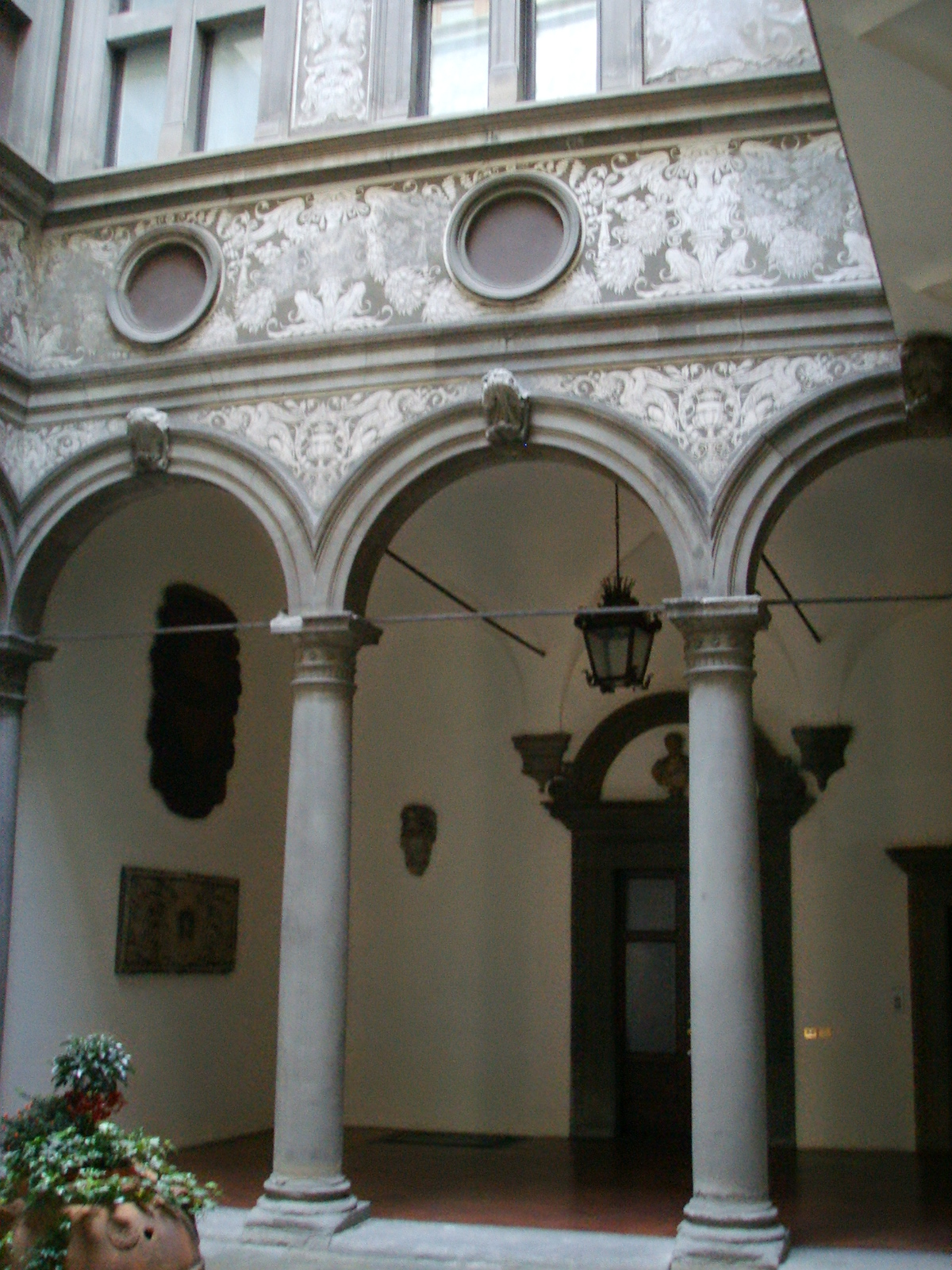
View of the court

== History ==
The palace arose at the site which once held the residence of the Soldanieri and later Dati families, which was bought by Bartolomeo Bartolini-Salimbeni.

The current edifice was erected by the architect Baccio d'Agnolo between 27 February 1520 and May 1523, as testified by a diary kept by Bartolini. The architect was paid two florins per month. The structure represents one of the earliest buildings in Florence expressing the High Renaissance style of Rome, where Baccio had spent several formative years. Another palace partially designed by Baccio is the Palazzo Antinori.

The Bartolini-Salimbeni lived in the palace until the early 19th century. In 1839 it became the Hotel du Nord, where figures such as the American writer Herman Melville sojourned. In 1863 it was acquired by the Pio di Savoia princes and split between different owners.

The palace was restored in 1961 and it is now a private property.

== Description ==
Palazzo Bartolini Salimbeni is the first palace in Florence built according to the "Roman" Renaissance style: details new to the city included the portal with columns at the sides, the use of pilasters, the square windows with a triangular pediment and the corners with rustication.

The singular new style, according to the Renaissance art historian Giorgio Vasari, caused much criticism. Though a generation later Vasari praised it as gentile di membra, "noble in its detail", in response to contemporary Florentine criticisms Baccio had the Latin inscription set over the door Carpere promptius quam imitari, "Criticizing is easier than imitating". The windows bear another inscription, in Italian, Per non dormire ("[A reward] For not sleeping"), the motto of the Salimbeni family that is also recalled by the Bartolini-Salimbeni coat of arms in the frieze at the first floor, featuring three poppies.

The palace has a central court in pure Classical style. It has a portico on three sides, with columns and round arches in traditional pietra serena. The ground and first floors have grotesque monochrome decorations. The first floor has a loggia with a coffered ceiling. This is surmounted by another smaller loggia.

The San Romano Battle paintings, painted by Paolo Uccello, were commissioned by a member of the Bartolini Salimbeni family; they are dispersed and now displayed in the Uffizi, National Gallery and Louvre museums.

=== Collezione Roberto Casamonti ===
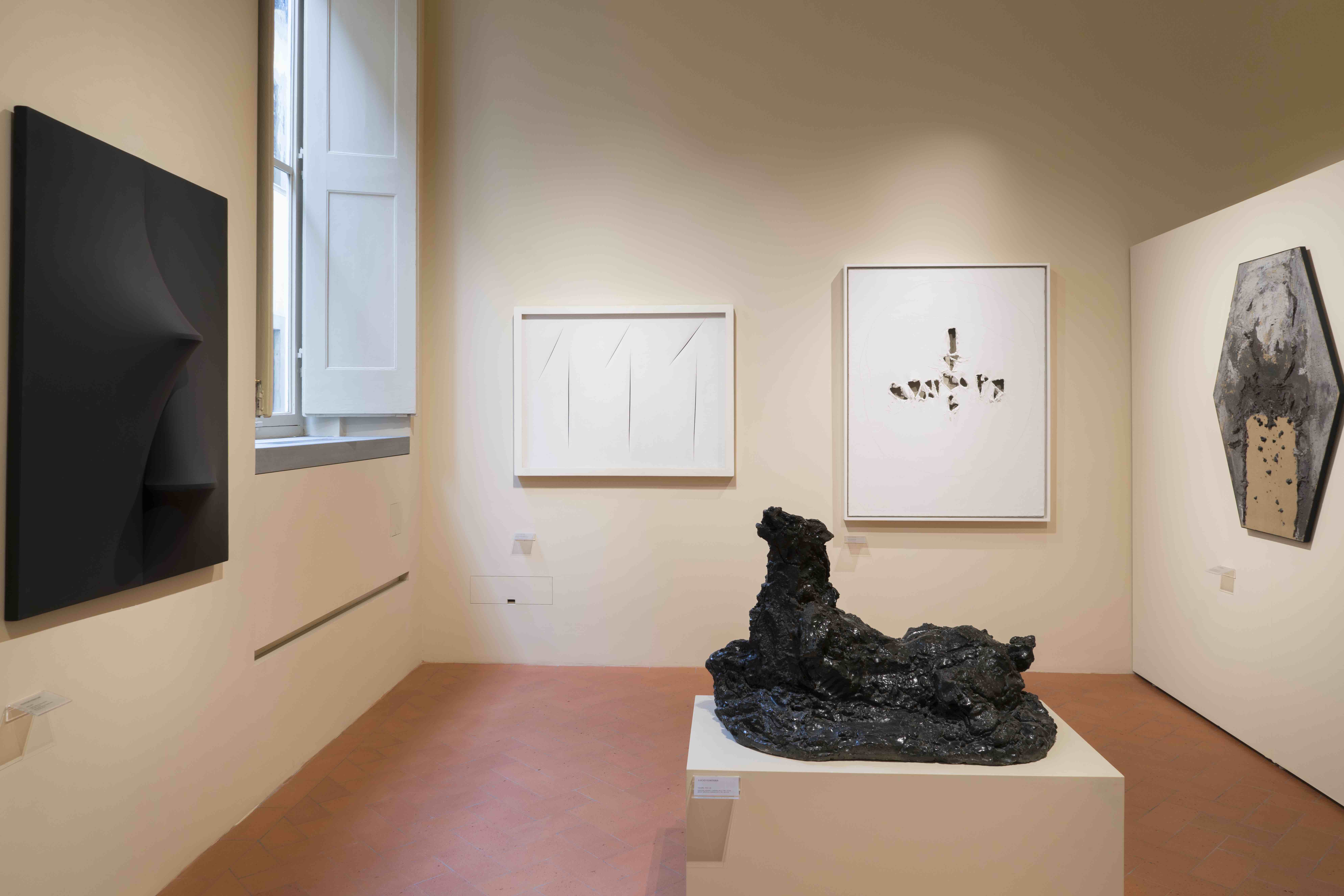
Exhibition of the first part of the Roberto Casamonti Collection in 2018

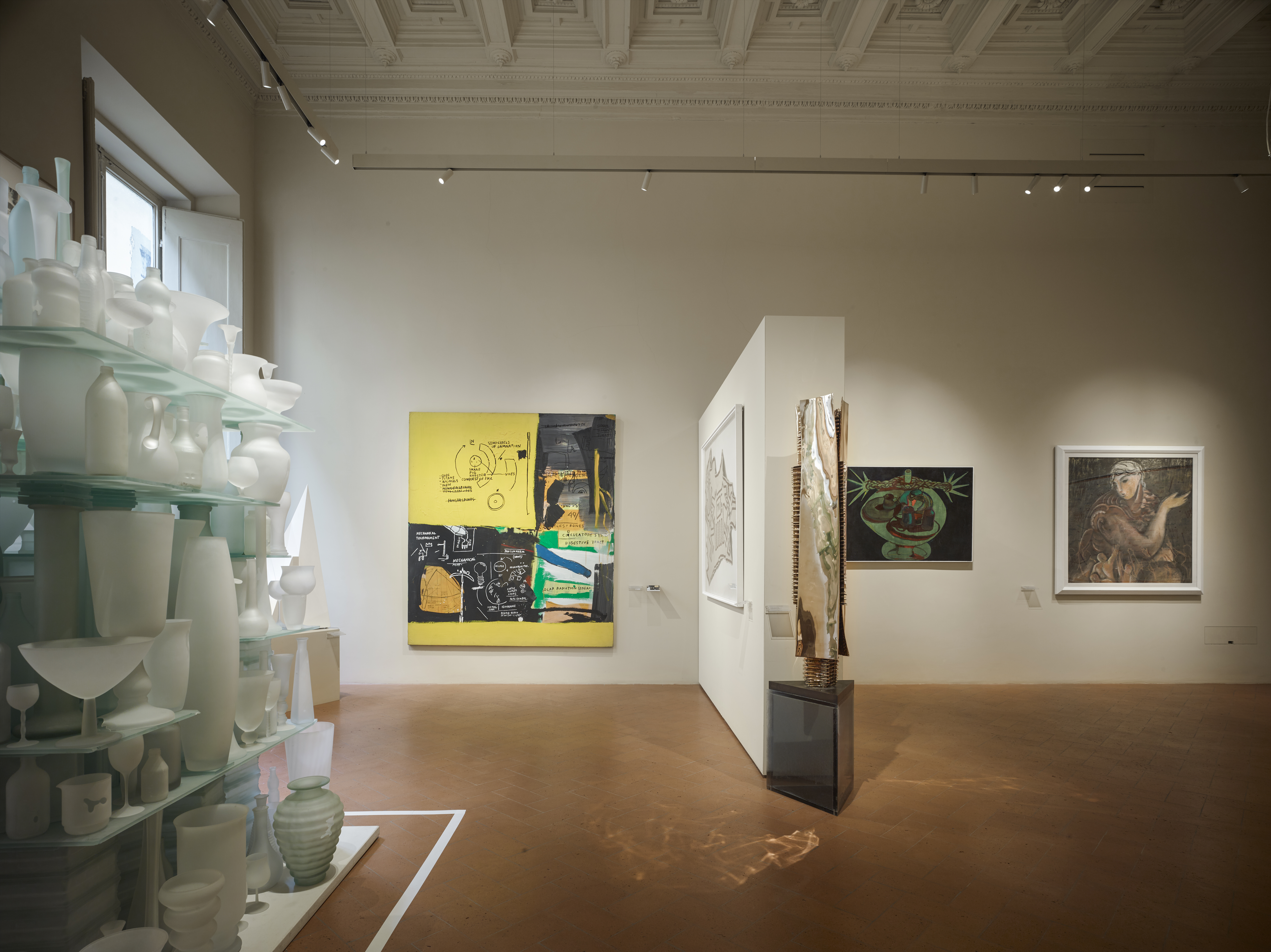
Exhibition of the second part od the Roberto Casamonti Collection in 2019

During his long activity as gallery owner of Tornabuoni Arte, Roberto Casamonti has collected works by the major Italian and international masters of 20th century art, with some fine inclusions of the 19th and 21st centuries as well.

The collection, which has been open to the public since 2018, consists of two chronologically ordered sections displayed in rotation on the piano nobile of Palazzo Bartolini Salimbeni:

- the first part includes artworks from the Early 20th Century to the 1960s realized by artists such as Giovanni Fattori, Giovanni Boldini, Giacomo Balla, Gino Severini, Carlo Carrà, Mario Sironi, Giorgio de Chirico, Giorgio Morandi, Max Ernst, Paul Klee, Pablo Picasso, Georges Braque, Fernand Léger, Lucio Fontana, Piero Manzoni, Alberto Burri, Andy Warhol;
- the second part includes artworks from the 1960s to the beginning of the 21st Century by Michelangelo Pistoletto, Mimmo Paladino, Mario Merz, Alighiero Boetti, Joan Mirò, Yves Klein, Antoni Tapies, Christo, Luigi Ontani, Gilbert & George, Jean-Michel Basquiat, Keith Haring, Anish Kapoor, Bill Viola, Maurizio Cattelan, Marina Abramovich, is currently on view.

== Sources ==
- Carlini, Sandra; Lara Mercanti; Giovanni Straffi (2001). I Palazzi parte prima. Arte e storia degli edifici civili di Firenze. Florence: Alinea.
- Lingohr Michael: Der Florentiner Palastbau der Hochrenaissance. Der Palazzo Bartolini Salimbeni in seinem historischen und architekturgeschichtlichen Kontext. Wernersche Verlagsgesellschaft, Worms 1997. ISBN 978-3-88462-137-0
