= Palazzo Mozzi =

Renaissance palace in Oltrarno, Florence, Italy

Coordinates: 43°45′52.81″N 11°15′28.77″E

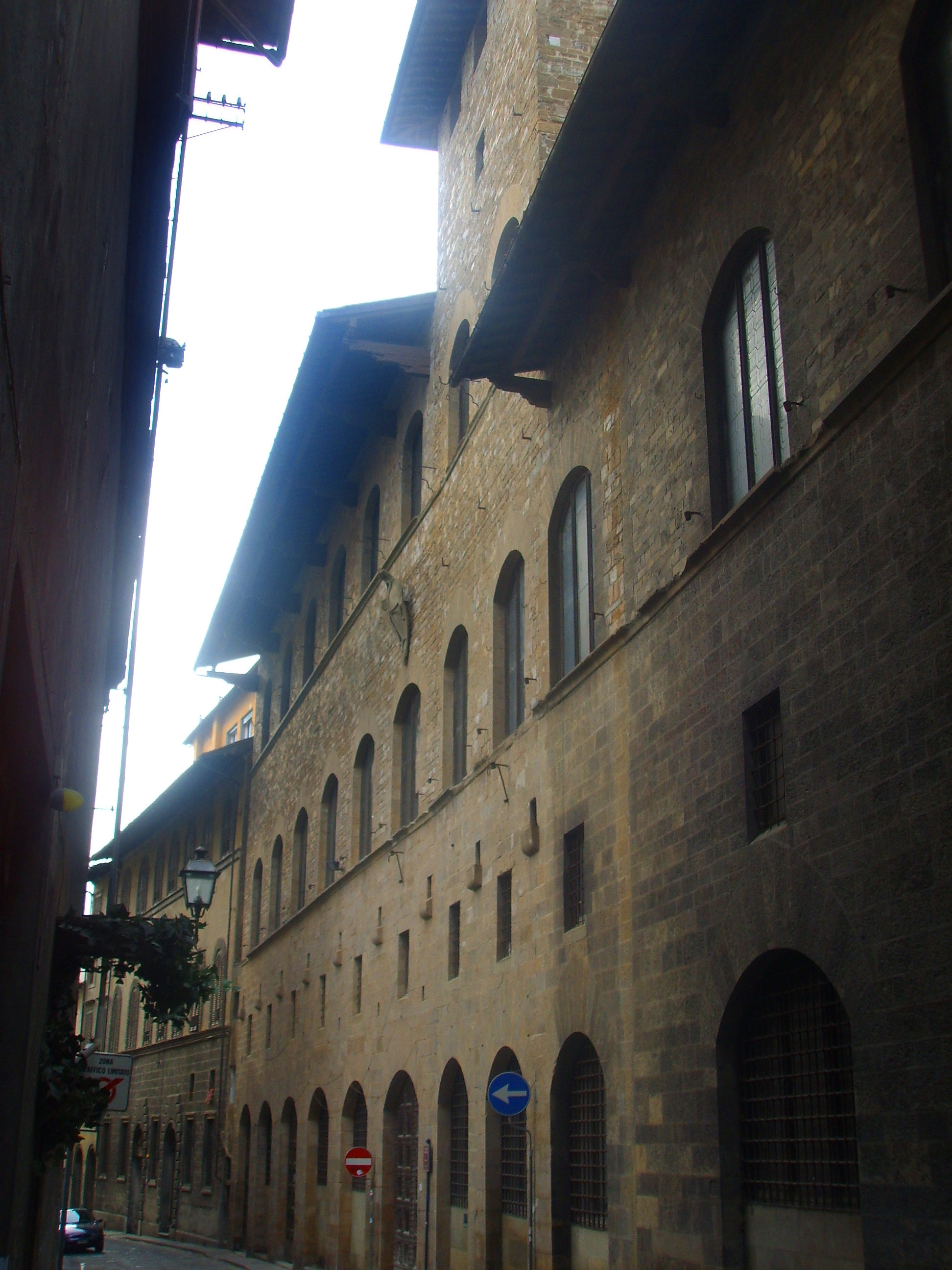
Palazzo Mozzi

Palazzo Mozzi or Palazzo de' Mozzi is an early Renaissance palace in the Oltrarno quarter of Florence, Italy. It is located at the end of the Piazza de' Mozzi which emerges from Ponte alle Grazie. The 13th-century palace housed the gallery of the highly successful antiquarian Stefano Bardini, of which the remnants were left to the commune, where they assembled the Museo Bardini or Mozzi Bardini, displaying Florentine art and artifacts up to the early Renaissance. The gardens elaborated against the hillside behind the palace were added mainly by Bardini.

== History ==
The palazzo was built by the Mozzi family between 1260 and 1273 as a fortification for the Ponte alle Grazie. The prominent Mozzi family had been persecuted in the past for its Guelph leanings. The palace in the 13th and 14th-centuries hosted prominent visitors to Florence such as Pope Gregory X, Robert, Duke of Anjou, and the Duke of Athens at the palazzo. This may have been due to its protected location, outside of the city center, near the Porta San Niccolo.

The palazzo was modified in the 14th century to a Renaissance house. The site changed hands during the 1500s, and the Mozzi family repossessed the site by 1551. During the 1700s and early 1800s, the palace was refurbished by the architect Gasparo Maria Paoletti, including the additions of some frescoes (1778) on the first floor.

With the extinction of the Mozzi family, the palace fell into disrepair, and was bought in 1880 by the Princess Vanda Carolath von Beuthen, then in 1913, by Stefano Bardini. The palace served as a gallery for the objects he had for sale, and a studio for his restorers. His will in 1922, required his heirs to convert his remaining collection into a cultural institution.

However, feuding of heirs retarded any progress towards this purpose until 1996, when the palace was acquired by the Commune. The palace façade has been restored to how it was expected to resemble in the 13th century. The main façade has a coat of arms of Mozzi with a Cross of Toulouse. The interior contains architectural elements including portals from various city structures dismembered during the 19th-century Risanamiento of the city. The State of Italy currently owns the palazzo. It was closed in 1999 for nearly a decade of restoration and re-opened in April 2009 to host the Bardini Museum (Museo Bardini).

In the 16th century, a plot of land was purchased behind the palazzo and was used to grow an olive grove. The grove was transformed into the Giardino Bardini in the 19th century when the palazzo was purchased by Stefano Bardini.

== Collections ==
Among the works on display are:

- Allegory of Charity, statue by Tino di Camaino
- St Michael Archangel, painting by Antonio del Pollaiuolo
- The Choice of Hercules, painting by Domenico Beccafumi
- Painted Crucifix, attributed to Bernardo Daddi
- Madonna della Mela, carved wood statue by Donatello
- Collections of decorative chests
- Collections of weapons and armor
- 15th-century polychrome stuccoes and wooden sculpture
- Collection of old musical instruments
- Collections of frames, doors, ceramics, and painted ceilings

The second floor of the building exhibits the Corsi collection that comprises some works from the 12th to the 19th centuries, donated by Mrs. Carobbi, the widow of Corsi, in 1938.
