= Ponte alle Grazie =

Bridge in Florence, Italy

Coordinates: 43.766286°N 11.258277°E

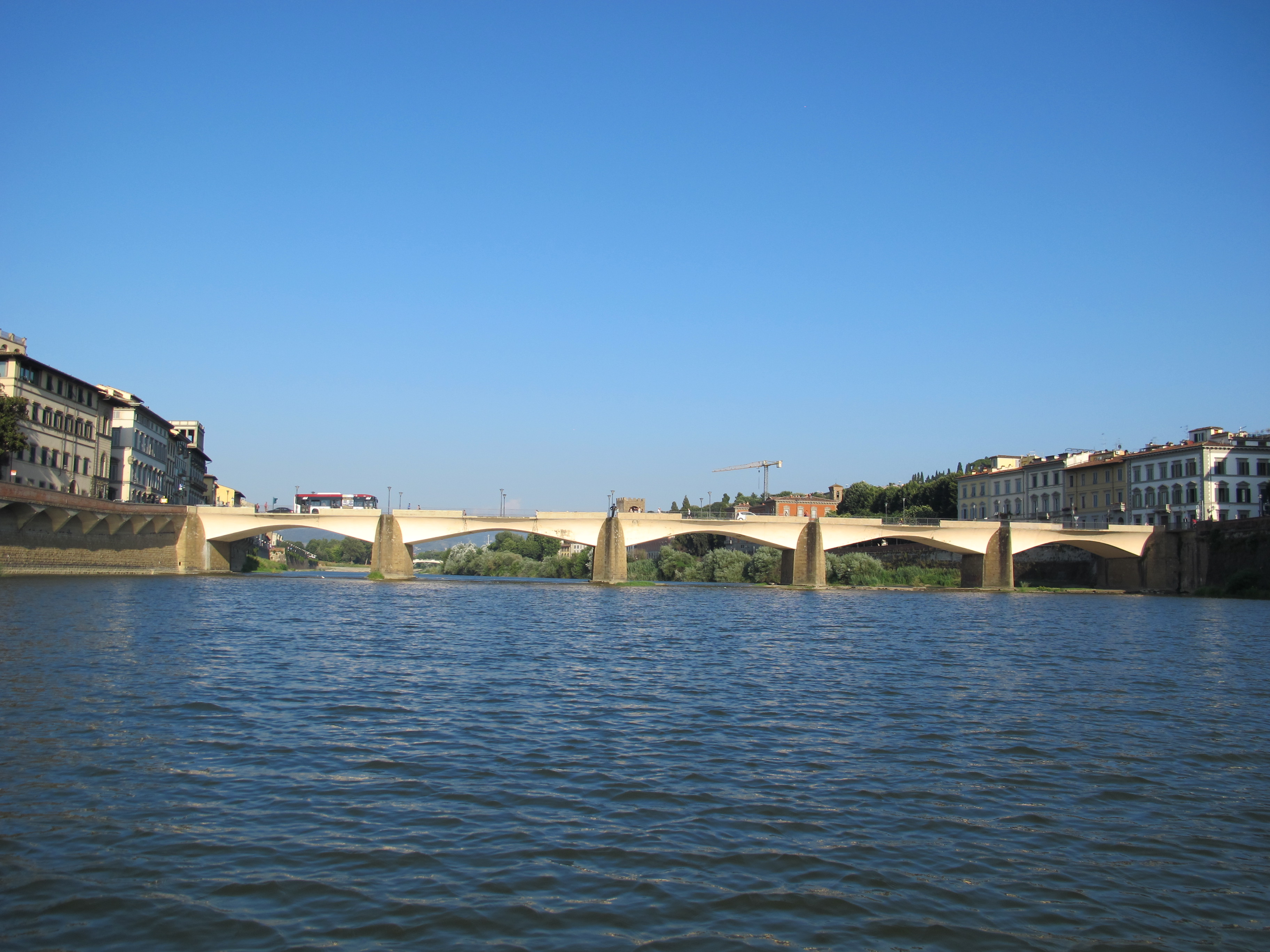
Ponte alle Grazie

Ponte alle Grazie is a bridge, reconstructed after 1945, over the Arno River in Florence, region of Tuscany, Italy.

== History ==
The original bridge was called Ponte di Rubaconte after the name of the podestà Rubaconte da Mandello who had commissioned construction in 1237, making it older than the Ponte Vecchio. It was rebuilt in 1345 with nine arches, making it the longest in Florence. Giorgio Vasari attributed the design to an architect by the name of Lapo Tedesco, the architect of the Bargello.

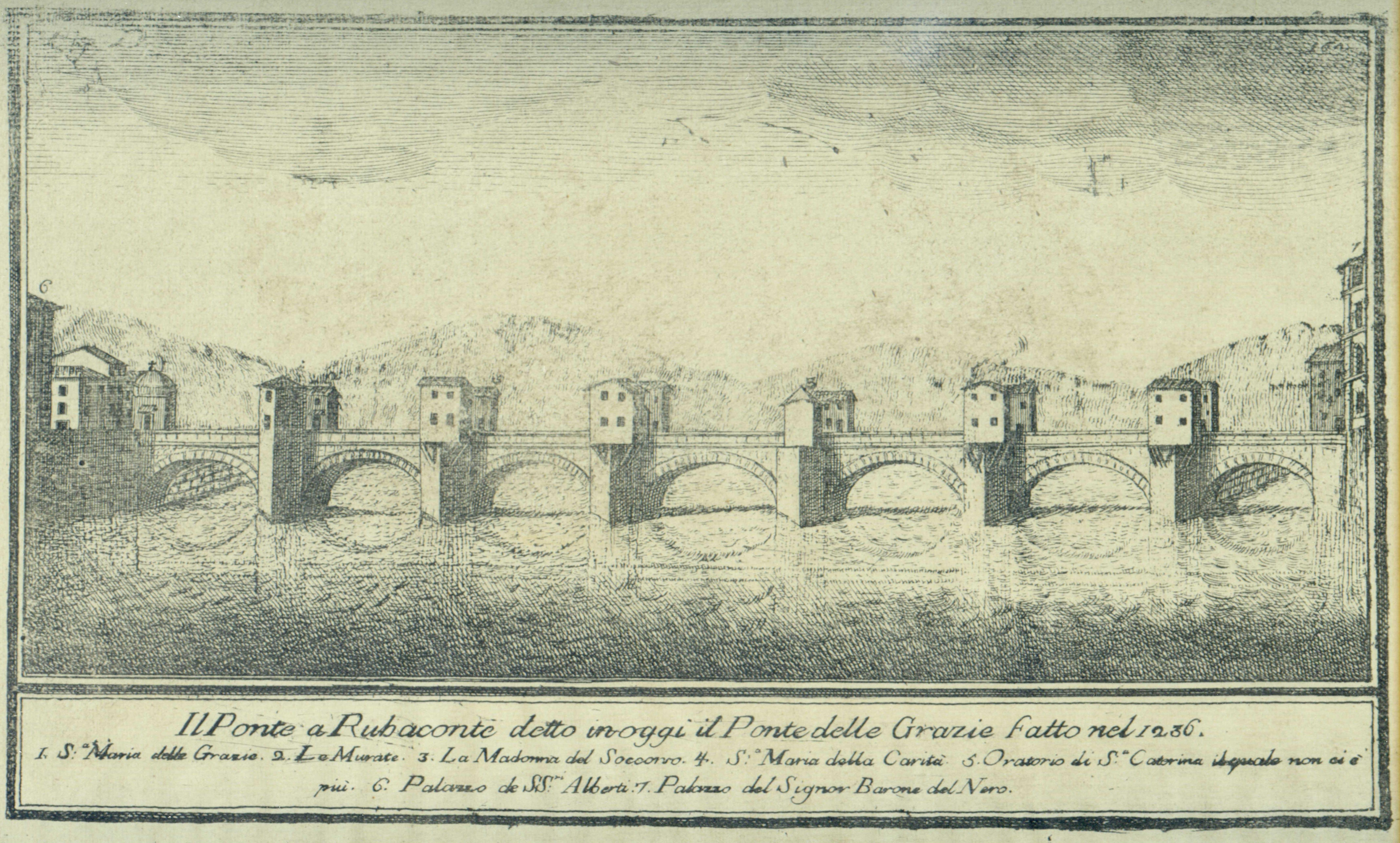
17th-century print of Bridge, with houses, looking North.

In 1346, two of the arches in the Oltrarno neighborhood were filled up to extend the bank, leaving the seven arch structure seen in a 17th-century print on this page. This landfill widened the street of Piazza dei Mozzi, which leads to the Palazzo Mozzi.

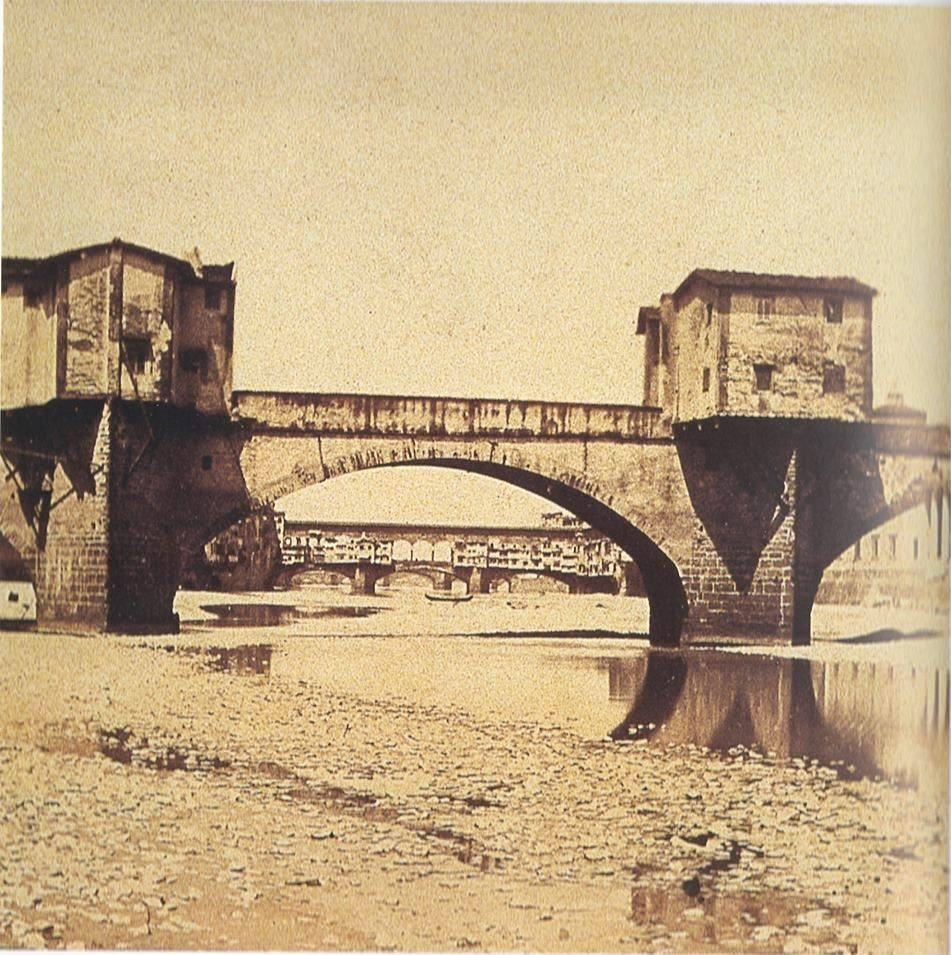
Photograph of Ponte alle Grazie in 1860s, with Ponte Vecchio in background.

On the city side was a small oratory with an icon of the Madonna Alle Grazie, which also gave the bridge its name. Structures were erected at each of the pylons, and remained there till a widening of the road, to make way for railway track. These structures initially were either chapels, once dedicated to Saints Catherine of Alexandria, Barbara, and Lawrence; or erected as huts for female hermits or Romite. These women, wishing to avoid the scandals of some of the nunneries in the city, were said to have immured themselves here, receiving their food from passersby through small slots. These hermitages were ultimately cleared and the remaining women moved to a convent near Santa Croce, renamed the Murate, or Immured. The houses became dwellings until cleared in the 1870s.

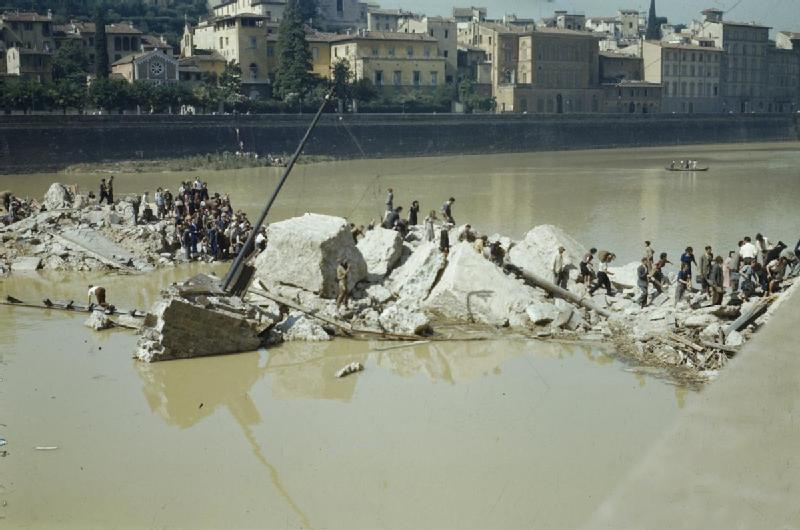
Florentines crossing the rubble of the Ponte alle Grazie on August 14, 1944

In August 1944, the bridge was destroyed by the retreating Germans as they withdrew before the advancing Allied forces in World War II. Following the end of the War, a competition was held to create a new design for a replacement bridge. The winning design, the work of a group formed of architects including Giovanni Michelucci, Edoardo Said, Edoardo Detti, Riccardo Gizdolich and Danilo Know and an engineer, Piero Melucci, feature four slender piers with thin arches between them. The new bridge was completed in 1953. While the new design is harmonious with the surrounding city, its modern design and construction materials do not mirror the shape of the prior bridge.

== Bibliography ==
- Zucconi, Guido (1995). Florence: An Architectural Guide (2001 Reprint ed.). San Giovanni Lupatoto (Vr): Arsenale Editrice. p. 132. ISBN 88-7743-147-4.
- "Ponte alle Grazie". Assessorato CULTURA e SPORT (in Italian).
