= Baccio d'Agnolo =

Italian woodcarver, sculptor, and architect

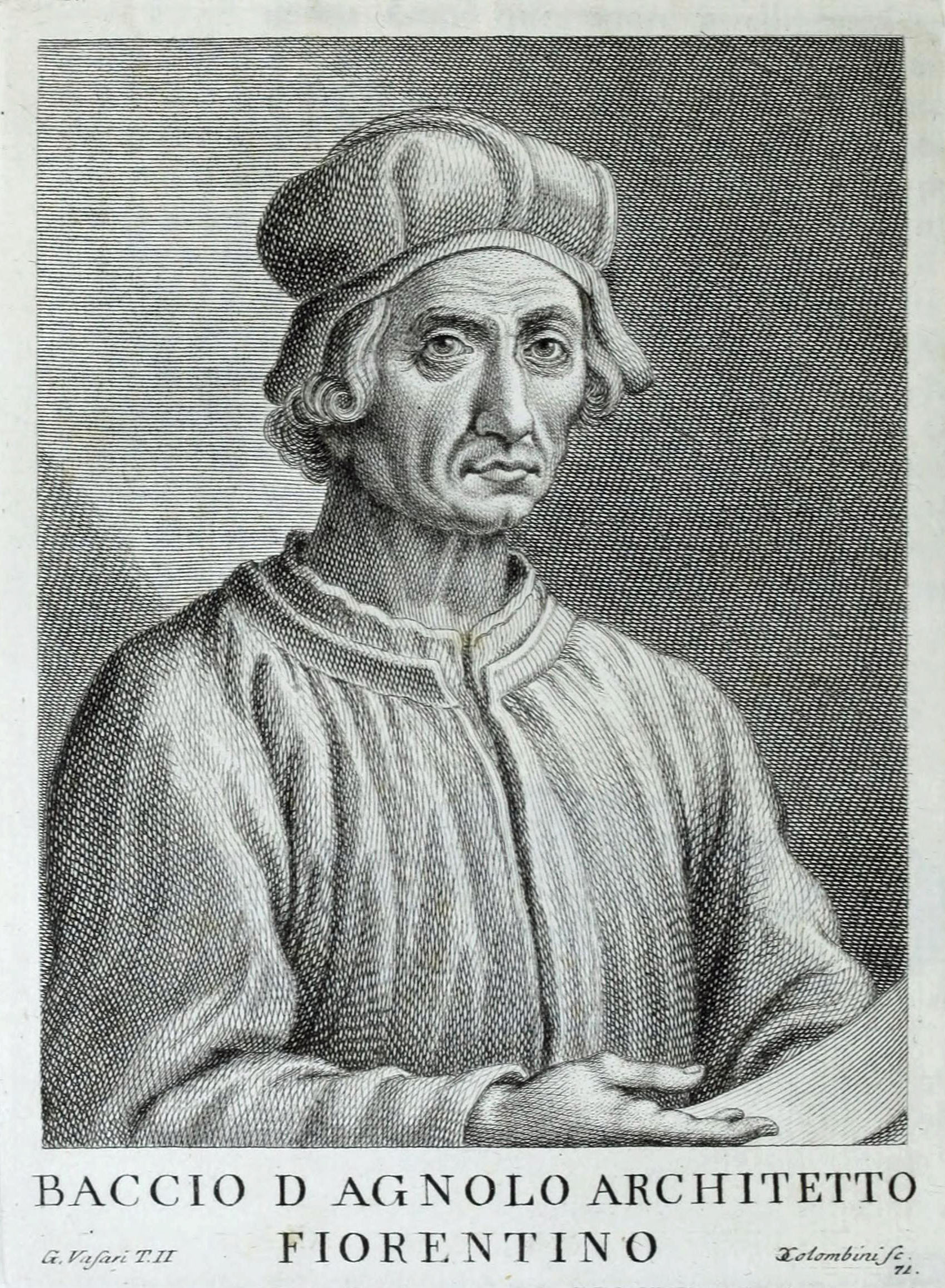
- Born: Bartolomeo Baglioni; 19 May 1462; Florence
- Died: 6 March 1543 (aged 80); Florence

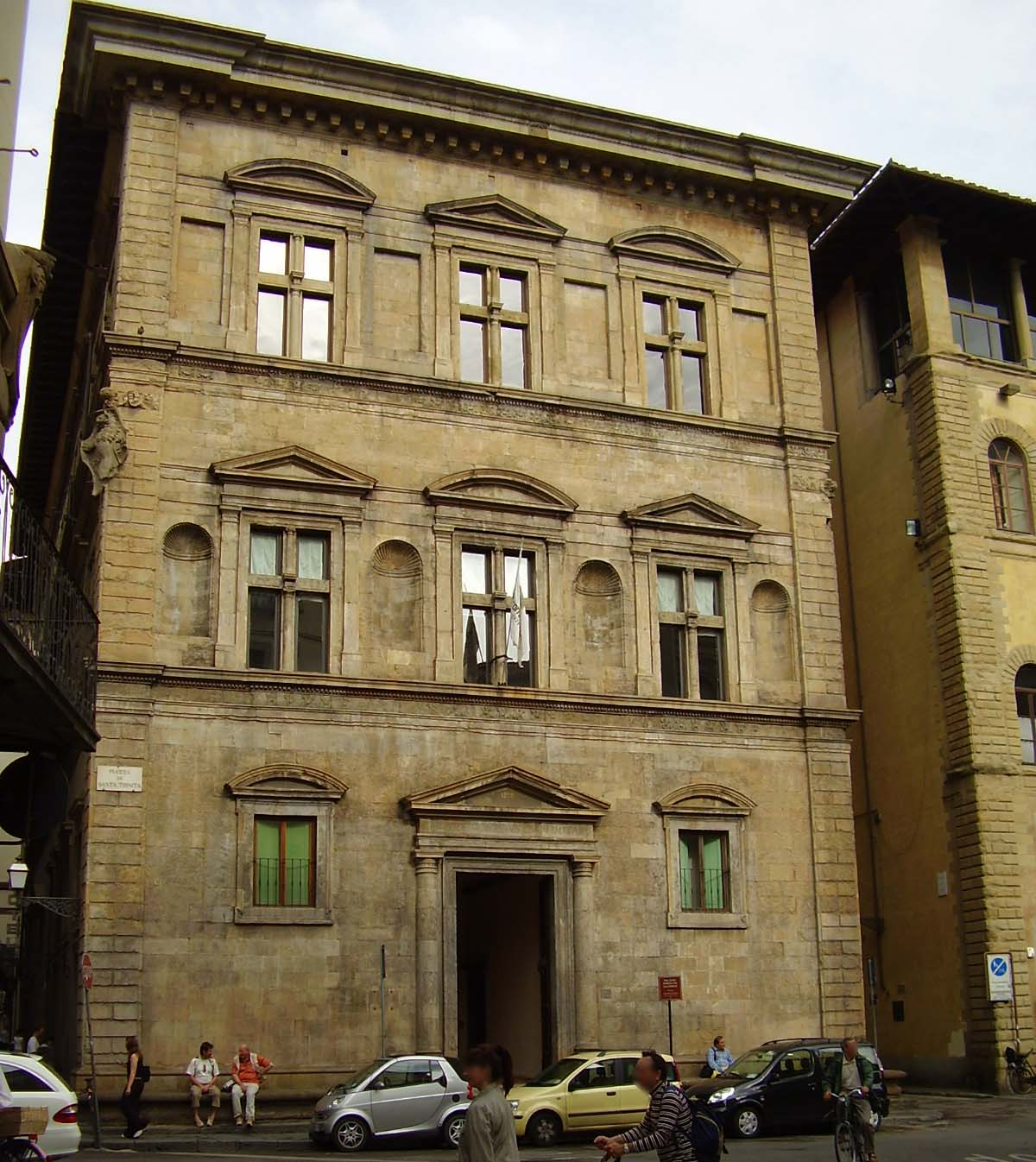
Palazzo Bartolini Salimbeni in Piazza Santa Trinita Florence

Baccio d'Agnolo (19 May 1462 – 6 March 1543), born Bartolomeo Baglioni, was an Italian woodcarver, sculptor, and architect from Florence.

== Biography ==
"Baccio" is an abbreviation of Bartolomeo, and "d'Agnolo" refers to Angelo, his father's name. He was the son of a hosier turned woodworker. He started as a wood-carver, and between 1491 and 1502 did much of the decorative carving in the church of Santa Maria Novella and the Palazzo Vecchio in Florence. The wooden structure of Santissima Annunziata, an elaborate double-sided altarpiece, was "begun in 1500 on a design by Baccio D'Agnolo". Having made his reputation as a sculptor he appears to have turned his attention to architecture, and to have studied at Rome, though the precise date is uncertain; but at the beginning of the sixteenth century he was engaged with the architect Simone del Pollaiolo in restoring the Palazzo Vecchio, and in 1506 he was commissioned to complete the drum of the cupola of the church of Santa Maria del Fiore. The latter work, however, was interrupted on account of adverse criticisms from Michelangelo, and it remained unexecuted.

In 1496 he began a long association with the Palazzo della Signoria for the fabric and decoration works. He gradually assumed a dominant role. In 1499 he became the head of the office of the works, a position he occupied until the end of his life. During this time, he designed many projects including a private apartment for Piero Soderini when he was Gonfalonier.

Baccio d'Agnolo also designed, among others, the Palazzo Borgherini-Rosselli del Turco and the Palazzo Bartolini Salimbeni. The Bartolini palace was the first house to be given frontispieces of columns to the door and windows, previously confined to churches. This is "the oldest example of the explicit use of window frames in secular architecture". He was ridiculed by the Florentines for this innovation. Another much-admired work of his was the campanile of the church of Santo Spirito. His studio was the resort of some of the most celebrated artists of the day: Michelangelo, Andrea Sansovino, the brothers Antonio da Sangallo the Elder and Giuliano da Sangallo, and the young Raphael. He died at Florence in 1543, leaving three sons, all architects, the best-known being Giuliano d'Agnolo.

Giorgio Vasari included Baccio in volume IV of his Vite.

== See also ==
- San Michele a Rovezzano
